= 1927 VPI Gobblers football team =

American college football season

1927 VPI Gobblers football
- Conference: Southern Conference
- Record: 5–4 (2–3 SoCon)
- Head coach: Andy Gustafson (2nd season)
- Captains: Albert Ewell Bailey; V. E. Miles
- Home stadium: Miles Stadium

1927 Southern Conference football standings
	Conf.					Overall
Team	W		L		T	W		L		T
Georgia Tech +	7	–	0	–	1	8	–	1	–	1
Tennessee +	5	–	0	–	1	8	–	0	–	1
NC State +	4	–	0	–	0	9	–	1	–	0
Vanderbilt	5	–	0	–	2	8	–	1	–	2
No. 8 Georgia	6	–	1	–	0	9	–	1	–	0
Florida	5	–	2	–	0	7	–	3	–	0
Ole Miss	3	–	2	–	0	5	–	3	–	1
Virginia	4	–	4	–	0	5	–	4	–	0
Clemson	2	–	2	–	0	5	–	3	–	1
Alabama	3	–	4	–	1	5	–	4	–	1
LSU	2	–	3	–	1	4	–	4	–	1
Mississippi A&M	2	–	3	–	0	5	–	3	–	0
Washington and Lee	2	–	3	–	0	4	–	4	–	1
VPI	2	–	3	–	0	5	–	4	–	0
Maryland	3	–	5	–	0	4	–	7	–	0
South Carolina	2	–	4	–	0	4	–	5	–	0
VMI	2	–	4	–	0	6	–	4	–	0
Tulane	2	–	5	–	1	2	–	5	–	1
North Carolina	2	–	5	–	0	4	–	6	–	0
Sewanee	1	–	4	–	0	2	–	6	–	0
Kentucky	1	–	5	–	0	3	–	6	–	1
Auburn	0	–	6	–	1	0	–	7	–	2
+ – Conference co-champions; Rankings from Dickinson System

The 1927 VPI Gobblers football team represented Virginia Polytechnic Institute in the 1927 college football season. The team was led by their head coach Andy Gustafson and finished with a record of five wins and four losses (5–4).

== Schedule ==
Date	Time	Opponent	Site	Result	Attendance	Source
September 24		Roanoke*	Miles Stadium; Blacksburg, VA	W 21–2		
October 1		Hampden–Sydney*	Miles Stadium; Blacksburg, VA	W 13–0		
October 8		at Colgate*	Whitnall Field; Hamilton, NY	W 6–0		
October 15	2:30 p.m.	vs. Maryland	League Park; Norfolk, VA	L 7–13	6,000	
October 22		at Virginia	Lambeth Field; Charlottesville, VA (rivalry)	L 0–7		
October 29		at Chattanooga*	Chamberlain Field; Chattanooga, TN	L 13–14		
November 5	2:30 p.m.	vs. South Carolina	Tate Field; Richmond, VA	W 35–0		
November 12		Washington and Lee^{†}	Miles Stadium; Blacksburg, VA	W 21–0	4,000	
November 24		vs. VMI	Maher Field; Roanoke, VA (rivalry)	L 9–12	17,000	
*Non-conference game; ^{†}Homecoming

== Before the season ==
The 1926 VPI Gobblers football team compiled a 5–3–1 record and were led by Andy Gustafson in his first season as head coach.

== Game summaries ==
=== Roanoke ===
Roanoke vs. VPI

Team	1	2	3	4	Total
Roanoke	0	2	0	0	2
• VPI	7	0	0	14	21

- Date: September 24, 1927
- Location: Miles Stadium
  Blacksburg, VA
- Referee: Parrish (VPI)

VPI's first game of the season was a victory over Roanoke at Miles Stadium.

The starting lineup for VPI was: Nutter (left end), Gray (left tackle), Miles (left guard), Brown (center), Hotchkiss (right guard), Bailey (right tackle), Petty (right end), MacArthur (quarterback), Peake (left halfback), Mattox (right halfback), Looney (fullback). The substitutes were: Amole, Anderson, Hudgins, Jacobs, Mahaney, McEver, Price, Rule, Spear, Tomko and Von Erickson.

The starting lineup for Roanoke was: Ed I. Bell (left end), Charles Wilson (left tackle), Virgil Morton (left guard), Harold Nank (center), Bill Frey (right guard), Maurice Givens (right tackle), D. C. Lionberger (right end), J. H. "Deana" Gilbert (quarterback), B. M. "Turtle" Jones (left halfback), Pleas Ramsey (right halfback), John Dietrich (fullback). The substitutes were: William Altizer, W. T. "Ted" Fix, John Frye, Thomas Fryer, Lloyd "Buzzy" Goode, William Logan, Martin, F. Ritter, Stanley Rutherford, James Shannon, G. R. Starnes and Billy O. Williams.

=== Hampden–Sydney ===
Hampden–Sydney vs. VPI

Team	1	2	3	4	Total
HS	0	0	0	0	0
• VPI	0	0	6	7	13

- Date: October 1, 1927
- Location: Miles Stadium
  Blacksburg, VA

After their victory over Roanoke, VPI played Hampden–Sydney College at Miles Stadium.

The starting lineup for VPI was: Nutter (left end), Moss (left tackle), Hotchkiss (left guard), Brown (center), Miles (right guard), Gray (right tackle), Petty (right end), McEver (quarterback), Mattox (left halfback), Tomko (right halfback), Looney (fullback). The substitutes were: Anderson, Bailey, Jacobs, Mahaney, Rice, Spear and Von Erickson.

The starting lineup for Hampden–Sydney was: Scott (left end), Stuart Worden (left tackle), Woodruff (left guard), Hudson (center), Hugh Blanton (right guard), Harry Myles (right tackle), Charles Turley (right end), Thomas Peach (quarterback), Jones (left halfback), Ruffner (right halfback), Charles Gatewood (fullback). The substitutes were: Cox, Hughes, Robert Lawson and Robert Nance.

=== Colgate ===
VPI at Colgate

Team	1	2	3	4	Total
• VPI	0	6	0	0	6
Colgate	0	0	0	0	0

- Date: October 8, 1927
- Location: Whitnall Field
  Hamilton, NY
- Referee: Frank Bergin

The starting lineup for VPI was: Nutter (left end), Gray (left tackle), Miles (left guard), Brown (center), Jones (right guard), Bailey (right tackle), Petty (right end), McEver (quarterback), Mattox (left halfback), Peake (right halfback), Looney (fullback). The substitutes were: Hotchkiss, MacArthur and Spear.

The starting lineup for Colgate was: Mike Stramiello (left end), Carl Mankat (left tackle), John Flagg (left guard), John Cox (center), Bruce DuMont (right guard), Arthur Huntington (right tackle), William Timm (right end), Edward Newell (quarterback), George Brewer (left halfback), John Galloway (right halfback), Harold Shaughnessy (fullback). The substitutes were: Thomas Dowler, Hoot Haines, Walter Mason, James Simmonds, George Stollwerck and Izzy Yablok.

=== Maryland ===
Maryland vs. VPI

Team	1	2	3	4	Total
• Maryland	0	6	0	7	13
VPI	0	0	0	7	7

- Date: October 15, 1927
- Location: League Park
  Norfolk, VA
- Game start: 2:30 p.m.
- Game attendance: 6,000
- Referee: Robert Kent Gooch

The starting lineup for VPI was: Nutter (left end), Gray (left tackle), Miles (left guard), Brown (center), Jones (right guard), Bailey (right tackle), Petty (right end), McEver (quarterback), Mattox (left halfback), Peake (right halfback), Looney (fullback). The substitutes were: Hotchkiss, MacArthur, Mahaney, Price, Rice, Spear and Tomko.

The starting lineup for Maryland was: Charles Dodson (left end), Earl Zulick (left tackle), John McDonald (left guard), Harold Bafford (center), Jack Keenan (right guard), Donald Adams (right tackle), Melvin Young (right end), Gordon Kessler (quarterback), Lewis "Knocky" Thomas (left halfback), Gerald Snyder (right halfback), Fred Linkous (fullback). The substitutes were: Al Heagy, Augie Roberts, Ed Tenney and Arthur Wondrack.

=== Virginia ===
VPI at Virginia

Team	1	2	3	4	Total
VPI	0	0	0	0	0
• UVA	0	7	0	0	7

- Date: October 22, 1927
- Location: Lambeth Field
  Charlottesville, VA
- Referee: Elcock (W&L)

The Gobblers lost their second straight game, this time against UVA in Charlottesville, Virginia. During the opening quarter, VPI marched 45 yards down the field, only to be stopped by UVA on the 3-yard line. In the second quarter, UVA scored the only points of the game, after an 85-yard drive. On their own 10-yard line, UVA's Sloan faked a punt and then ran for 35 yards. The drive concluded with a lateral pass from Hushion to Sloan for the touchdown.

The starting lineup for VPI was: Nutter (left end), Gray (left tackle), Miles (left guard), Brown (center), Jones (right guard), Bailey (right tackle), Petty (right end), McEver (quarterback), Mattox (left halfback), Peake (right halfback), Looney (fullback). The substitutes were: Hotchkiss, Hubbard, MacArthur, Rice, Rule and Spear.

The starting lineup for Virginia was: Howard Turner (left end), William Luke (left tackle), Garland Daniel (left guard), George Taylor (center), Wallace Symington (right guard), Bickerton Cardwell (right tackle), Albert Hofheimer (right end), John Hushion (quarterback), Gus Kaminer (left halfback), John Sloan (right halfback), Quintus Hutter (fullback). The substitutes were: Oscar Close, Meade, Samuel Pendleton and Bledsoe Pinkerton.

=== Chattanooga ===
VPI at Chattanooga

Team	1	2	3	4	Total
VPI	6	0	7	0	13
• Chattanooga	0	7	7	0	14

- Date: October 29, 1927
- Location: Chamberlain Field
  Chattanooga, TN
- Referee: Ryan (Michigan)

The starting lineup for VPI was: Nutter (left end), Gray (left tackle), Hotchkiss (left guard), Brown (center), Miles (right guard), Bailey (right tackle), Petty (right end), McEver (quarterback), Mattox (left halfback), Peake (right halfback), Looney (fullback). The substitutes were: MacArthur and Tomko.

The starting lineup for Chattanooga was: Robert Groeschel (left end), Bowden Findley (left tackle), James Cassidy (left guard), Philip Magevny (center), Leslie Morgan (right guard), Joe Kopcha (right tackle), Milton Thompson (right end), Donald Overmeyer (quarterback), Clarence Lautzenheiser (left halfback), Cleveland Barrett (right halfback), Dale Cryster (fullback).

=== South Carolina ===
VPI vs. South Carolina

Team	1	2	3	4	Total
• VPI	7	0	21	7	35
SC	0	0	0	0	0

- Date: November 5, 1927
- Location: Tate Field
  Richmond, VA
- Game start: 2:30 p.m.
- Referee: Witt (UVA)

The starting lineup for VPI was: Nutter (left end), Gray (left tackle), Miles (left guard), Brown (center), Hotchkiss (right guard), Bailey (right tackle), Petty (right end), McEver (quarterback), Mattox (left halfback), Peake (right halfback), Hudgins (fullback). The substitutes were: MacArthur, Rule and Tomko.

The starting lineup for South Carolina was: Robert Stoddard (left end), Harry Wolfe (left tackle), Ralph Guarino (left guard), R. E. "Red" Fulmer (center), W. R. "Monkey" Price (right guard), Floyd Thomas (right tackle), George Keels (right end), Emmett Wingfield (quarterback), Pita (left halfback), Hiza (right halfback), W. W. "Red" Swink (fullback). The substitutes were: Edwin Zobel.

=== Washington and Lee ===
Washington and Lee vs. VPI

Team	1	2	3	4	Total
W&L	0	0	0	0	0
• VPI	0	8	6	7	21

- Date: November 12, 1927
- Location: Miles Stadium
  Blacksburg, VA
- Game attendance: 4,000
- Referee: Robert Kent Gooch

The starting lineup for VPI was: Nutter (left end), Gray (left tackle), Miles (left guard), Brown (center), Hotchkiss (right guard), Bailey (right tackle), Petty (right end), McEver (quarterback), Tomko (left halfback), Peake (right halfback), Hudgins (fullback).

The starting lineup for Washington and Lee was: Wilmer Dorsey (left end), Earl Fitzpatrick (left tackle), Myer Seligman (left guard), Rhydon Latham (center), Henry Groop (right guard), Virgil Fisher (right tackle), Hollis Spotts (right end), Robert Howe (quarterback), David Eberhart (left halfback), T. P. Stearns (right halfback), Eugene White (fullback).

=== VMI ===
VMI vs. VPI

Team	1	2	3	4	Total
• VMI	0	0	0	12	12
VPI	7	0	0	2	9

- Date: November 24, 1927
- Location: Maher Field
  Roanoke, VA
- Game attendance: 17,000
- Referee: Ed Thorpe (De LaSalle)

The starting lineup for VPI was: Nutter (left end), Gray (left tackle), Miles (left guard), Brown (center), Hotchkiss (right guard), Bailey (right tackle), Petty (right end), MacArthur (quarterback), Peake (left halfback), Tomko (right halfback), McEver (fullback). The substitutes were: Hubbard, Hudgins, Jones, Mattox, Moss and Spear.

The starting lineup for VMI was: William Moss (left end), Kenneth Rugh (left tackle), Karlyle O'Berry (left guard), Joseph Mondy (center), William Haase (right guard), Luther Hewlett (right tackle), Luther Thornhill (right end), Albert Hawkins (quarterback), Frank Harner (left halfback), Charles Holtzclaw (right halfback), Bernard McCray (fullback). The substitutes were: Adams, Al Barnes, John Biggs, Edward Carney, Louis Chadwick, Joel Moody and Tommy Scott.

== Players ==
=== Roster ===
VPI 1927 roster
Roger Lee Amole; George Claiborne "Speck" Anderson; Albert Bailey (Capt.); Joseph Brown; John Gray; Philip Hotchkiss; Hubbard; William Hudgins; J. R. Jacobs; J. B. Jones; John Looney; Scotty MacArthur; Arthur Mahaney	Cloy Mattox; Herbert McEver; V. E. Miles (Capt.); Jack Wellford Moss; Lloyd Nutter; Frank Peake; Douglas Petty; Nelson Osborn Price; J. H. Rice; Eugene Butler Rule; Spear; Tommy Tomko; Von Erickson

=== Monogram Club members ===
Fourteen players received monograms for their participation on the 1927 VPI team.

Player	Hometown	Notes
Albert Ewell Bailey (Capt.)	Roanoke, Virginia	
Joseph Murray Brown	Staunton, Virginia	
John Edward Gray	Newport News, Virginia	
Philip Smith Hotchkiss		
William Coles Hudgins		
John Ote Looney	Roanoke, Virginia	
James Bushell "Scotty" MacArthur	Newport News, Virginia	Born in Greenock, Scotland.
Arthur Randolph Mahaney		
Cloy Mattox	Leesville, Virginia	Major League Baseball catcher for the Philadelphia Athletics during the 1929 season.
Vernon Edward Miles (Capt.)	Norfolk, Virginia	
Lloyd Broderick Nutter	Blacksburg, Virginia	World War II veteran (Captain, Army).
Frank Peake	Hampton, Virginia	
Douglas Cooper Petty	Hilton Village, Virginia	
Cyril Method "Tommy" Tomko	Disputanta, Virginia	

== Coaching and training staff ==
- Head coach: Andy Gustafson
- Assistant coach: N. Lee Frank
- Manager: W. M. Johnson
- Trainer: Bud Moore
- Freshman head coach: Henry Redd
- Freshman Manager: W. S. Gay
