= 1927 Georgia Tech Golden Tornado football team =

American college football season

1927 Georgia Tech Golden Tornado football

SoCon co-champion
- Conference: Southern Conference
- Record: 8–1–1 (7–0–1 SoCon)
- Head coach: William Alexander (8th season)
- Offensive scheme: Jump shift
- Captain: Ed Crowley
- Home stadium: Grant Field

Uniform
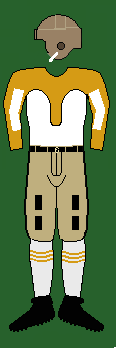

1927 Southern Conference football standings
	Conf.					Overall
Team	W		L		T	W		L		T
Georgia Tech +	7	–	0	–	1	8	–	1	–	1
Tennessee +	5	–	0	–	1	8	–	0	–	1
NC State +	4	–	0	–	0	9	–	1	–	0
Vanderbilt	5	–	0	–	2	8	–	1	–	2
No. 8 Georgia	6	–	1	–	0	9	–	1	–	0
Florida	5	–	2	–	0	7	–	3	–	0
Ole Miss	3	–	2	–	0	5	–	3	–	1
Virginia	4	–	4	–	0	5	–	4	–	0
Clemson	2	–	2	–	0	5	–	3	–	1
Alabama	3	–	4	–	1	5	–	4	–	1
LSU	2	–	3	–	1	4	–	4	–	1
Mississippi A&M	2	–	3	–	0	5	–	3	–	0
Washington and Lee	2	–	3	–	0	4	–	4	–	1
VPI	2	–	3	–	0	5	–	4	–	0
Maryland	3	–	5	–	0	4	–	7	–	0
South Carolina	2	–	4	–	0	4	–	5	–	0
VMI	2	–	4	–	0	6	–	4	–	0
Tulane	2	–	5	–	1	2	–	5	–	1
North Carolina	2	–	5	–	0	4	–	6	–	0
Sewanee	1	–	4	–	0	2	–	6	–	0
Kentucky	1	–	5	–	0	3	–	6	–	1
Auburn	0	–	6	–	1	0	–	7	–	2
+ – Conference co-champions; Rankings from Dickinson System

The 1927 Georgia Tech Golden Tornado football team (Note: Although Georgia Tech's teams are officially known as the "Yellow Jackets", northern writers called the team the "Golden Tornado" in 1917; the name was commonly used until 1928 and for many years afterwards as an alternate nickname. It may have been coined by Morgan Blake.) represented the Georgia Tech Golden Tornado of the Georgia Institute of Technology during the 1927 Southern Conference football season. A member of the Southern Conference (SoCon), Georgia Tech was coached by William Alexander in his eighth year as head coach, compiling a record of 8–1–1 (7–0–1 SoCon) and outscoring opponents 125 to 39. Georgia Tech played its home games at Grant Field.

In what was considered the best Georgia Tech season since 1918, the Tornado shared the SoCon title with the Tennessee Volunteers and NC State Wolfpack. Tech clinched the SoCon in the season's final game: upsetting rival Georgia's previously undefeated "dream and wonder team" which was nonetheless picked as a national champion by some selectors. Coach Alexander notably instituted "The Plan" to beat the rival Bulldogs; for weeks saving his regulars for practice.

The Tornado also upset the Alabama Crimson Tide, handing the Tide their first loss in over two seasons. One researcher ranks Tech as the year's best Southern defense. Tech suffered its only loss to Notre Dame, and held Vanderbilt to a scoreless tie.

== Before the season ==
Tech was coming off the weakest season in coach William Alexander's tenure.

== Schedule ==
Date	Time	Opponent	Site	Result	Attendance	Source
October 1		VMI	Grant Field; Atlanta, GA	W 7–0	17,000	
October 8		Tulane	Grant Field; Atlanta, GA	W 13–6	12,000	
October 15		Alabama	Grant Field; Atlanta, GA (rivalry)	W 13–0	25,000	
October 22		North Carolina	Grant Field; Atlanta, GA	W 13–0	13,000	
October 29	2:00 p. m.	at Notre Dame*	Cartier Field; South Bend, IN (rivalry)	L 26–7	20,000	
November 5		at Vanderbilt	Dudley Field; Nashville, TN (rivalry)	T 0–0	17,000	
November 12		LSU	Grant Field; Atlanta, GA	W 23–0		
November 19		Oglethorpe*	Grant Field; Atlanta, GA	W 19–7		
November 24	2:00 p.m.	Auburn	Grant Field; Atlanta, GA (rivalry)	W 18–0	15,000	
December 3	2:00 p.m.	No. 1 Georgia	Grant Field; Atlanta, GA (Clean, Old-Fashioned Hate)	W 12–0	38,000	
*Non-conference game; Rankings from Coaches' Poll released prior to the game

== Game summaries ==
=== Week 1: VMI ===
Week 1: VMI at Georgia Tech

Team	1	2	3	4	Total
VMI	0	0	0	0	0
• Ga. Tech	0	0	7	0	7

- Date: October 7
- Location: Grant Field
  Atlanta, GA
- Game attendance: 17,000
- Referee: Bill Streit

To open the season, Tech defeated VMI 7–0. The Cadets played strongly for two quarters, but were near collapse by game's end. Al Barnes starred for VMI and Stumpy Thomason starred for Tech. "The V. M. I. team tried every brand of football they knew. But it was useless against the Tech defense and offense." The lone score came from Warner Mizell.

The starting lineup was: Crowley (left end), Thrash (left tackle), Martin (left guard), Pund (center), Drennon (right guard), Hood (right tackle), Waddey (right end), Smith (quarterback), Parham (left halfback), Horn (right halfback), Randolph (fullback).

=== Week 2: Tulane ===
Week 2: Tulane at Georgia Tech

Team	1	2	3	4	Total
Tulane	0	6	0	0	6
• Ga. Tech	7	0	0	6	13

- Date: October 8
- Location: Grant Field
  Atlanta, GA
- Game attendance: 12,000
- Game weather: Rain
- Referee: Arthur R. Hutchins

On a sloppy, wet field, the Tornado beat Tulane 13–6 despite many publications calling the game a "toss-up". Tech's first score came after a fumble recovery when Stumpy Thomason scored. In the second quarter, Bill Banker "zigzagged through the entire Tech defense" for an 80-yard touchdown. Rain fell at halftime and for the entire third quarter. In the fourth quarter, Thomason had another, 10-yard touchdown.

On the 11th, 15,000 gathered at Grant Field to pay tribute to Charles Lindbergh.

The starting lineup was: Crowley (left end), Watkins (left tackle), Westbrook (left guard), Rusk (center), Drennon (right guard), Speer (right tackle), Waddey (right end), Durant (quarterback), Mizell (left halfback), Thomason (right halfback), Randolph (fullback).

=== Week 3: Alabama ===
Week 3: Alabama at Georgia Tech

Team	1	2	3	4	Total
Alabama	0	0	0	0	0
• Ga. Tech	0	7	0	6	13

- Date: October 15
- Location: Grant Field
  Atlanta, GA
- Game attendance: 25,000
- Referee: Frank Birch

In the biggest upset of the young Southern Conference season, Georgia Tech defeated Wallace Wade's defending national champion Alabama Crimson Tide 13–0. The loss snapped Alabama's 24-game unbeaten streak.

Alabama had the upper hand in the first quarter, advancing the ball steadily to Tech's 14-yard line before being stopped on downs. The Jackets tipped the scale with a drive in the second quarter, highlighted by a 30-yard touchdown run by Stumpy Thomason. After a scoreless, see-sawing second half, the last touchdown was scored by Warner Mizell in the final minute.

The starting lineup was: Crowley (left end), Thrash (left tackle), Martin (left guard), Pund (center), Drennon (right guard), Hood (right tackle), Waddey (right end), Durant (quarterback), Parham (left halfback), Thomason (right halfback), Randolph (fullback).

=== Week 4: North Carolina ===
Week 4: North Carolina at Georgia Tech

Team	1	2	3	4	Total
UNC	0	0	0	0	0
• Ga. Tech	0	7	0	6	13

- Date: October 22
- Location: Grant Field
  Atlanta, GA
- Referee: Hoban (Dartmouth)

In the fourth week of play, Tech defeated the North Carolina Tar Heels 13–0. Tech's defensive line had a stellar game, several times thwarting the Tar Heel as it approached the goal. The first touchdown came in the second quarter, after a drive using fullback Randolph on several line plunges. A lateral pass sent captain Ed Crowley over for the score. In the fourth quarter, Stumpy Thomason had a 75-yard touchdown.

The starting lineup was: Bullard (left end), Watkins (left tackle), Westbrook (left guard), Ruck (center), Martin (right guard), Hood (right tackle), Waddey (right end), Schulman (quarterback), Mizell (left halfback), Fitzgerald (right halfback), Devaughn (fullback).

=== Week 5: at Notre Dame ===
Week 5: Georgia Tech at Notre Dame

Team	1	2	3	4	Total
Ga. Tech	0	0	0	7	7
• Notre Dame	0	6	13	7	26

- Date: October 29
- Location: Carter Field
  South Bend, IN
- Game attendance: 17,000

At Carter Field, Knute Rockne's Notre Dame Fighting Irish easily defeated Georgia Tech 26–7 in one of the season's most important clashes. "Had Rockne willed it the score might have doubled;" and "only the able punting of Mizell...prevented a greater victory for the Irish."

Rockne started the game with substitutes, and sent in his regulars to start the second quarter. A 12-yard off-tackle run, a 25-yard pass, and an 11-yard gain on a double pass preceded a touchdown. The Irish led just 6–0 at the half. In the second half the Irish poured it on; the lone score from Tech was by Stumpy Thomason after a blocked Irish punt.

The starting lineup was: Crowley (left end), Hood (left tackle), Martin (left guard), Pund (center), Drennon (right guard), Watkins (right tackle), Waddey (right end), Durant (quarterback), Thomason (left halfback), Mizell (right halfback), Randolph (fullback).

=== Week 6: at Vanderbilt ===
Week 6: Georgia Tech at Vanderbilt

Team	1	2	3	4	Total
Ga. Tech	0	0	0	0	0
Vanderbilt	0	0	0	0	0

- Date: November 6
- Location: Dudley Field
  Nashville, TN
- Game weather: Wet

A wet field and a strong defense, ranked by one researcher as best in the South, helped Tech reassert itself and held the Vanderbilt Commodores to a scoreless tie, despite the Commodores having the upper hand in play.

With the recent loss to Notre Dame, Tech had been overshadowed before the game by rival Georgia and its national championship bid. A strong game had been predicted, showcasing each team's backfield stars in Stumpy Thomason of Tech and Bill Spears of Vanderbilt. The high-flying attack of quarterback Spears led one writer to say Vandy produced "almost certainly the legit top Heisman candidate in Spears, if there had been a Heisman Trophy to award in 1927."

The starting lineup was: Crowley (left end), Thrash (left tackle), Drennon (left guard), Pund (center), Martin (right guard), Hood (right tackle), Waddey (right end), Durant (quarterback), Mizell (left halfback), Thomason (right halfback), Randolph (fullback).

=== Week 7: LSU ===
Week 7: LSU at Georgia Tech

Team	1	2	3	4	Total
LSU	0	0	0	0	0
• Ga. Tech	0	3	7	13	23

- Date: November 13
- Location: Grant Field
  Atlanta, GA
- Referee: Powell (Wisconsin)

Starting the game with second-string men only to send them in later and add 20 points, Tech crushed coach Mike Donahue's LSU Tigers 23–0. "The game was devoid of thrills". The first touchdown came late in the third quarter, when Randolph scored behind right tackle.

The starting lineup was: Bullard (left end), Thrash (left tackle), Lillard (left guard), Rusk (center), Westbrook (right guard), Hood (right tackle), Holland (right end), Smith (quarterback), Parham (left halfback), Horn (right halfback), Randolph (fullback).

=== Week 8: Oglethorpe ===
The Oglethorpe Stormy Petrels led the Tornado through three quarters 7–6, threatening to upset Tech just as it had last year. Oglethorpe scored on a Stumpy Thomason fumble. Tech managed to survive the scare by pulling ahead 19–7 in the final quarter. Warner Mizell saved the day with two touchdowns.

=== Week 9: Auburn ===
Week 9: Auburn at Georgia Tech

Team	1	2	3	4	Total
Auburn	0	0	0	0	0
• Ga. Tech	6	0	12	0	18

- Date: November 27
- Location: Grant Field
  Atlanta, GA
- Game attendance: 15,000
- Referee: Jack Black (Davidson)

Tech easily beat the Auburn Tigers 18–0. Auburn did not win a game all year. Stumpy Thomason went over the line for the first score In the second half, Tech played its first string minus Thomason, and Tech scored two more touchdowns. Warner Mizell ran off tackle for 50 yards for the first, and had a 1-yard run for the second.

The starting lineup was: Bullard (left end), Hood (left tackle), Westbrook (left guard), Rusk (center), Lillard (right guard), Thrash (right tackle), Holland (right end), Smith (quarterback), Parham (left halfback), Thomason (right halfback), Oltz (fullback).

=== Week 10: Georgia ===
Week 10: Georgia at Georgia Tech

Team	1	2	3	4	Total
Georgia	0	0	0	0	0
• Ga. Tech	0	6	6	0	12

- Date: December 3
- Location: Grant Field
  Atlanta, GA
- Game attendance: 38,000
- Referee: Gardner (Cornell)

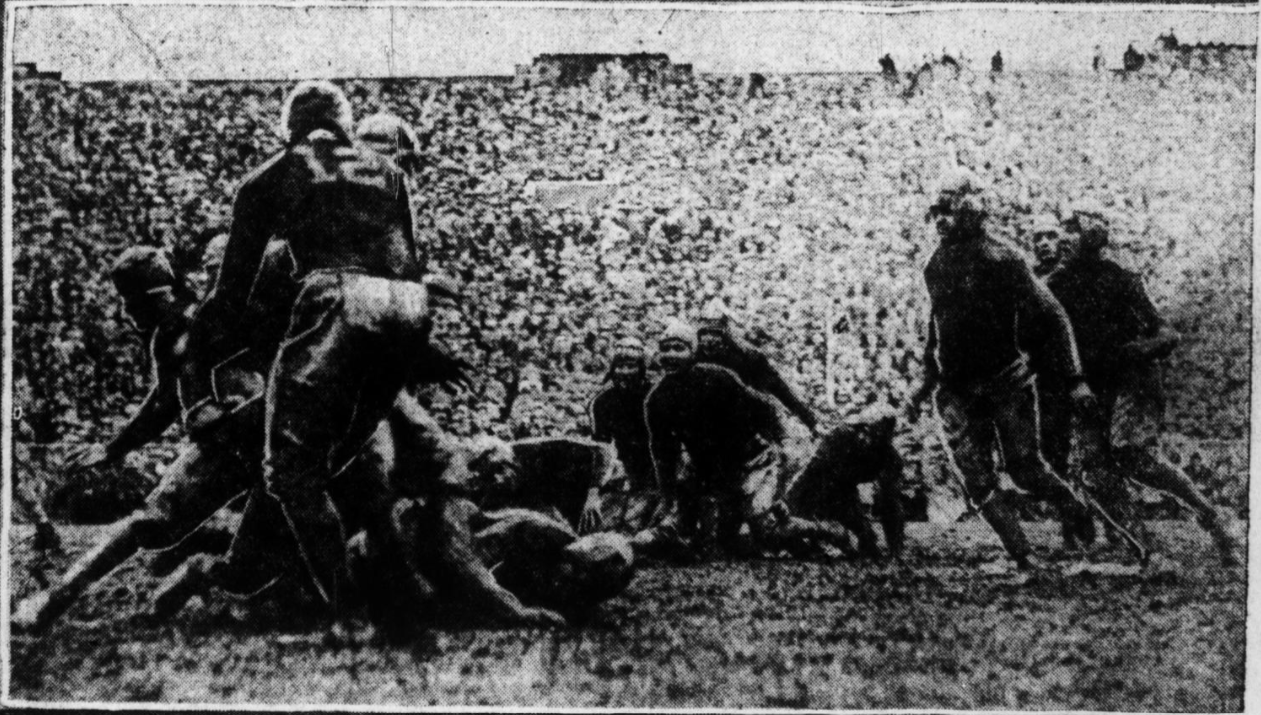
Scene from the Georgia game

Georgia Tech faced the undefeated and top-ranked in-state rival Georgia Bulldogs for the conference crown. The Bulldogs were known as the "Dream and Wonder team" and gave Yale its only loss. In the rain, Tech won 12–0. Georgia accused Tech of saturating their own field while Tech claimed a heavy rain storm rolled in the night before the game. For the first time this year, neither of Georgia's ends Tom Nash nor Shiver played particularly well.

Prior to the game, Coach Alexander instituted "The Plan," splitting his team into two squads and playing mostly reserves for four weeks. The regulars practiced for the upcoming Georgia contest. Grant Field was expected to be filled to capacity, the largest crowd ever in the south. One account read "And never in the history of athletics in the Southland has there been an occasion so momentous as this. The football championship of the South and as some may justifiably figure, the nation, will be decided on Saturday in the capital city and native sons will decide it."

Tech's first touchdown came on a pass from Warner Mizell to quarterback Bob Durant. The second one came shortly after Stumpy Thomason returned an interception 57 yards to Georgia's 22-yard line. Thomason scored on a 13-yard end run.

The starting lineup was: Crowley (left end), Watkins (left tackle), Westbrook (left guard), Pund (center), Drennon (right guard), Speer (right tackle), Waddey (right end), Durant (quarterback), Mizell (left halfback), Read (right halfback), Randolph (fullback).

== Postseason ==
The defeat of Georgia netted Tech the Southern title. Several Tech players received postseason honors. Tackle Frank Speer, Center Peter Pund, and Halfbacks Warner Mizell and Stumpy Thomason were all selected All-Southern.

== Personnel ==
=== Depth chart ===
The following chart depicts Tech's lineup during the 1927 season with games started at the position shown in parentheses. The chart mimics the offense after the jump shift has taken place.

LE
Ed Crowley (6)
Bullard (3)
Slick Keener (0)

LT	LG	C	RG	RT
Ken Thrash (4)	Joe Westbrook (4)	Peter Pund (5)	Raleigh Drennon (5)	Papa Hood (5)
Coot Watkins (3)	Firpo Martin (2)	Seedy Rusk (4)	Firpo Martin (2)	Frank Speer (2)
Papa Hood (2)	Raleigh Drennon (1)	Geo. Muse (0)	Lillard (1)	Ken Thrash (1)
	Lillard (1)		Joe Westbrook (1)	Coot Watkins (1)

RE
Frank Waddey (7)
Glenn Holland (2)
P. Von Weller (0)

QB
Bob Durant (5)
Shorty Smith (3)
Izzy Schulman (1)

RHB
Stumpy Thomason (4)
Bob Horn (2)
Fite Fitzgerald (1)
Warner Mizell (1)
Read (1)
Russ Russell (0)

FB
Bob Randolph (7)
Devaughn (1)
Oltz (1)

LHB
Warner Mizell (4)
Bob Parham (4)
Stumpy Thomason (1)
Sleepy Faisst (0)
Jimmie Frink (0)

=== Roster ===
==== Line ====
Number	Player	Position	Games started	Hometown	Prep school	Height	Weight	Age
14	Bullard	End	3					
42	Ed Crowley	End	6	Watkinsville, Georgia		6'1"	180	21
51	Raleigh Drennon	Guard	6	Atlanta, Georgia		5'10"	187	20
9	Glenn Holland	End	2	Atlanta, Georgia		5'11"	170	19
2	Papa Hood	Tackle	7				220	
49	Slick Keener	End	0	Gadsden, Alabama		5'10"	181	20
63	Joe Kent	Guard	0	Moultrie, Georgia		5'10"	181	20
36	Lillard	Guard	2					
66	Firpo Martin	Guard	2					
50	Geo Muse	Center	0	Covington, Kentucky		5'10"	178	18
71	Peter Pund	Center	5	Augusta, Georgia	Richmond Academy	6'0"	182	20
37	Seedy Rusk	Center	4	Atlanta, Georgia		6'0"	179	20
17	Frank Speer	Tackle	2	Atlanta, Georgia		6'0"	204	19
41	Ken Thrash	Tackle	5	Orlando, Florida		5'10"	190	21
33	Phil Von Weller	End	0	Albany, Georgia		6'0"	178	19
52	Frank Waddey	End	7	Memphis, Tennessee		5'10"	184	22
65	Coot Watkins	Tackle	1	Atlanta, Georgia		6'0"	199	19
61	Joe Westbrook	Guard	5	Moultrie, Georgia		5'11"	180	22

==== Backfield ====
Number	Player	Position	Games started	Hometown	Prep school	Height	Weight	Age
40	DeVaughn	Fullback	1					
29	Bob Durant	Quarterback	5	Bluefield, West Virginia		5'9"	161	19
28	Sleepy Faisst	Halfback	0	Little Rock, Arkansas		5'10"	160	19
25	Fite Fitzgerald	Halfback	1	Jackson, Tennessee		5'10"	164	19
13	Jimmie Frink	Halfback	0	Miami, Florida		5'10"	162	18
38	Bob Horn	Halfback	2	Norfolk, Virginia		5'10"	178	20
72	Warner Mizell	Halfback	5	Atlanta, Georgia	Miami Senior High	5'10"	170	19
44	Oltz	Fullback	1					
60	Bob Parham	Halfback	4	Atlanta, Georgia		6'1"	176	20
30	Bob Randolph	Fullback	7	Atlanta, Georgia		5'10"	176	20
11	Read	Halfback	1					
10	Russ Russell	Halfback	0	New York, New York		5'10"	160	18
64	Izzy Shulman	Quarterback	1	Jackson, Tennessee		5'8"	155	19
26	Shorty Smith	Halfback	3	Cartersville, Georgia		5'7"	153	20
35	Stumpy Thomason	Halfback	5	Atlanta, Georgia		5'8"	174	19

==== Unlisted ====
Number	Player
1	Heeke
4	Largen
7	Queen
8	Diekman
12	Sprick
15	Jetton
22	Alexander
27	Lewis
45	Gaston
46	Bunch
53	Schwartz
55	Sloan

== See also ==
- 1927 Southern Conference football season
- 1927 College Football All-Southern Team
- 1927 College Football All-America Team
