= 1927 Alabama Crimson Tide football team =

Football team representing the University of Alabama

1927 Alabama Crimson Tide football
- Conference: Southern Conference
- Record: 5–4–1 (3–4–1 SoCon)
- Head coach: Wallace Wade (5th season)
- Offensive scheme: Single-wing
- Captain: Fred Pickhard
- Home stadium: Denny Field; Rickwood Field; Legion Field; Cramton Bowl

Uniform
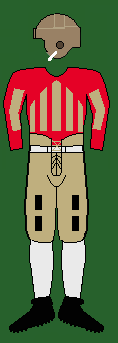

1927 Southern Conference football standings
	Conf.					Overall
Team	W		L		T	W		L		T
Georgia Tech +	7	–	0	–	1	8	–	1	–	1
Tennessee +	5	–	0	–	1	8	–	0	–	1
NC State +	4	–	0	–	0	9	–	1	–	0
Vanderbilt	5	–	0	–	2	8	–	1	–	2
No. 8 Georgia	6	–	1	–	0	9	–	1	–	0
Florida	5	–	2	–	0	7	–	3	–	0
Ole Miss	3	–	2	–	0	5	–	3	–	1
Virginia	4	–	4	–	0	5	–	4	–	0
Clemson	2	–	2	–	0	5	–	3	–	1
Alabama	3	–	4	–	1	5	–	4	–	1
LSU	2	–	3	–	1	4	–	4	–	1
Mississippi A&M	2	–	3	–	0	5	–	3	–	0
Washington and Lee	2	–	3	–	0	4	–	4	–	1
VPI	2	–	3	–	0	5	–	4	–	0
Maryland	3	–	5	–	0	4	–	7	–	0
South Carolina	2	–	4	–	0	4	–	5	–	0
VMI	2	–	4	–	0	6	–	4	–	0
Tulane	2	–	5	–	1	2	–	5	–	1
North Carolina	2	–	5	–	0	4	–	6	–	0
Sewanee	1	–	4	–	0	2	–	6	–	0
Kentucky	1	–	5	–	0	3	–	6	–	1
Auburn	0	–	6	–	1	0	–	7	–	2
+ – Conference co-champions; Rankings from Dickinson System

The 1927 Alabama Crimson Tide football team (variously "Alabama", "UA" or "Bama") represented the University of Alabama in the 1927 Southern Conference football season. It was the Crimson Tide's 34th overall and 6th season as a member of the Southern Conference (SoCon). The team was led by head coach Wallace Wade, in his fifth year, and played their home games at Denny Field in Tuscaloosa, at Rickwood Field and Legion Field in Birmingham and at the Cramton Bowl in Montgomery, Alabama. They finished the season with a record of five wins, four losses and one tie (5–4–1 overall, 3–4–1 in the SoCon).

Alabama's 13–0 loss to Georgia Tech on October 15 ended a 24-game unbeaten streak. It was the team's first loss since begin defeated in an upset by Centre College on November 15, 1924. Alabama outgained Tech 188–144 in the game, but Tech scored a touchdown in the second quarter and scored another after recovering a fumble at the Alabama 1 with two minutes to go. It was the first time Georgia Tech had scored points on Alabama since 1922. Alabama came from behind in the fourth to beat Mississippi State 13–7 but limped home with three straight losses to end the year at 5–4–1. Four losses were one more loss than Bama had suffered in the previous four seasons combined.

The loss to Georgia was the first football game Alabama ever played in Legion Field, which had been constructed the previous year, and which replaced Rickwood Field as Alabama's "home" stadium in Birmingham. Alabama would continue to schedule home dates at Legion Field for another 76 years, with the last being a 40–17 victory over South Florida in 2003.

== Schedule ==
Date	Opponent	Site	Result	Attendance	Source
September 24	Millsaps*	Denny Field; Tuscaloosa, AL	W 46–0		
September 30	Southwestern (TN)*	Denny Field; Tuscaloosa, AL	W 31–0		
October 8	LSU	Rickwood Field; Birmingham, AL (rivalry)	T 0–0	12,000	
October 15	at Georgia Tech	Grant Field; Atlanta, GA (rivalry)	L 0–13	25,000	
October 22	Sewanee	Rickwood Field; Birmingham, AL	W 24–0		
October 29	Mississippi A&M^{†}	Denny Field; Tuscaloosa, AL (rivalry)	W 13–7	7,000	
November 5	Kentucky	Rickwood Field; Birmingham, AL	W 21–6		
November 12	Florida	Cramton Bowl; Montgomery, AL (rivalry)	L 6–13		
November 24	Georgia	Legion Field; Birmingham, AL (rivalry)	L 6–20	25,000	
December 3	Vanderbilt	Legion Field; Birmingham, AL	L 7–14	20,000	
*Non-conference game; ^{†}Homecoming

== Game summaries ==
=== Millsaps ===
Week 1: Millsaps at Alabama

Team	1	2	3	4	Total
Millsaps	0	0	0	0	0
• Alabama	7	14	13	12	46

- Date: September 24
- Location: Denny Field
  Tuscaloosa, AL
- Referee: Severenen (Oberlin)

Alabama opened their 1927 season against Millsaps College at Denny Field, and defeated the Majors 46–0. Highlights of the game included touchdowns scored on a 45-yard fumble return by Archie Taylor and an 80-yard run by Davis Brasfield. Other touchdowns were scored by Tony Holm (2), Tolbert Brown, William Hicks and Graham McClintock.

The starting lineup was Earl Smith (left end), Fred Pickhard (left tackle), James Bowdoin (left guard), George Dye (center), Ellis Hagler (right guard), Clark Pearce (right tackle), S. D. Beale (right end), Graham McClintock (quarterback), Tolbert Brown (left halfback), Davis Brasfield (right halfback), Tony Holm (fullback).

=== Southwestern (TN) ===
Week 2: Southwestern (TN) at Alabama

Team	1	2	3	4	Total
SW Presbyterian	0	0	0	0	0
• Alabama	0	7	18	6	31

- Date: September 30
- Location: Denny Field
  Tuscaloosa, AL

Alabama concluded their 1927 non-conference schedule against Southwestern Presbyterian University (now known as Rhodes College) at Denny Field, and defeated the Lynx 31–0. In the game, Alabama touchdowns were scored by Davis Brasfield (2), Tolbert Brown, William Hicks and Tony Holm.

=== LSU ===
Week 3: LSU at Alabama

Team	1	2	3	4	Total
LSU	0	0	0	0	0
Alabama	0	0	0	0	0

- Date: October 8
- Location: Rickwood Field
  Birmingham, AL
- Game attendance: 12,000
- Referee: Severenen (Oberlin)

Before 12,000 fans at a rainy and muddy Rickwood Field, Alabama played the LSU Tigers to a scoreless tie.

The starting lineup was Earl Smith (left end), Fred Pickhard (left tackle), James Bowdoin (left guard), Clark Pearce (center), Ellis Hagler (right guard), Molton Smith (right tackle), S. D. Beale (right end), Graham McClintock (quarterback), Tolbert Brown (left halfback), Davis Brasfield (right halfback), Tony Holm (fullback).

=== Georgia Tech ===
Week 4: Alabama at Georgia Tech

Team	1	2	3	4	Total
Alabama	0	0	0	0	0
• Georgia Tech	0	7	0	6	13

- Date: October 15
- Location: Grant Field
  Atlanta, GA
- Game attendance: 25,000
- Referee: Birch (Chicago)

Against the Golden Tornado, Alabama suffered their first loss since their 1924 season with this 13–0 defeat at Grant Field and ended a 24-game unbeaten streak. After a scoreless first quarter, Tech took a 7–0 lead after Stumpy Thomason scored on a 30-yard touchdown run. The score remained the same through the fourth quarter when Warner Mizell made the final score 13–0 with his one-yard touchdown run.

The starting lineup was Earl Smith (left end), Fred Pickhard (left tackle), James Bowdoin (left guard), George Dye (center), Ellis Hagler (right guard), Clark Pearce (right tackle), S. D. Beale (right end), Graham McClintock (quarterback), Davis Brasfield (left halfback), Tolbert Brown (right halfback), Tony Holm (fullback).

=== Florida ===
Alabama suffered its second upset of the season to the Florida Gators, 13–6 in Montgomery. Clyde Crabtree returned a punt 95 yards for a touchdown early in the second quarter Alabama's Molton Smith intercepted Crabtree's pass in the fourth quarter and ran for a 45-yard touchdown. After an Alabama penalty, Carl Brumbaugh ran across for the second and decisive touchdown. Crabtree also had two 55-yard kickoff returns, and gained more from scrimmage that afternoon than did the Tide, accounting for 271 yards.

=== Georgia ===
Georgia at Alabama

Team	1	2	3	4	Total
• Georgia	7	7	6	0	20
Alabama	0	0	0	7	7

- Date: November 24
- Location: Athens, GA
- Game attendance: 25,000

In the first game played at the newly completed Legion Field, the Tide lost to Georgia 20–7, snapping a five-game winning streak against Georgia.

Roy Estes passed to Tom Nash. for the first score, and Estes ran the second score in himself. Another pass to Nash got a touchdown in the third quarter. In the final period, Alabama's Brasfield went back to pass, but saw no one open, and took off running. In the game's most sensational play, he dodged three tacklers behind the line, and evaded three more on his way to the endzone.

=== Vanderbilt ===
Vanderbilt at Alabama

Team	1	2	3	4	Total
• Vanderbilt	7	0	0	7	14
Alabama	0	7	0	0	7

- Date: December 3
- Location: Legion Field
  Birmingham, AL
- Game attendance: 20,000

In the season finale, Vanderbilt's Bill Spears gained more than the entire Alabama backfield as the Commodores won 14–7. The highlight of Vanderbilt's first scoring drive was a pass from Spears to Jimmy Armistead of 20 yards, down to the 3-yard line, from which Armistead later ran it in.

On Alabama's scoring drive, Red Brown ran 23 yards on a reverse, down to the 4-yard line. Tony Holm eventually got the score. In the fourth quarter, Spears led the winning drive, once circling end for 34 yards, tackling by Starling just as he seemed to break free. He then passed to Larry Creson for 10 yards, ran for 6, and then 13 more around end to the 16-yard line. After Spears and Armistead worked it down to the 9-yard line, a pass to Gibson got the touchdown.
