= Bill Middlekauff =

American football player, attorney, boxer, and wrestler

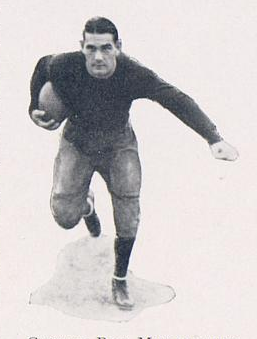
- Middlekauff c. 1927

Profile
- Position: Fullback

Personal information
- Born: December 28, 1904; Miami, Florida, U.S.
- Died: September 1957
- Listed height: 6 ft 2 in (1.88 m)
- Listed weight: 200 lb (91 kg)

Career information
- College: Florida (1923–1924; 1926–1927)

Awards and highlights
- All-Southern (1927); All-Time Florida Gators football team (1927)

Willis William Middlekauff (December 28, 1904 – September 1957) was an American college football player, attorney, boxer, and wrestler.

== University of Florida ==
Middlekauff from 1922–25 and in 1927 was a member of the University of Florida swimming, track and boxing teams. He was often called "Big Bill." At UF he was a member of Alpha Tau Omega.

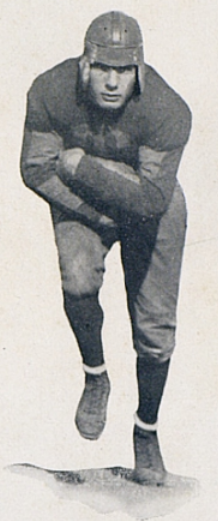
Middlekauff in 1923.

=== Football ===
Middlekauff was a prominent fullback for coach James Van Fleet and coach Tom Sebring's Florida Gators football team of the University of Florida from 1923 to 1924, and 1926 to 1927. One accounts recalls he "rams a line and can back one up to perfection." Jeff Moshier called him Florida's greatest fullback. In 1927, the Florida Alumnus, the official organ of the Florida Alumni, agreed. In his first season on the freshman team, the team won the southern crown for freshmen squads.

==== 1924 ====
In the 14–7 loss to Army, Middlekauff broke his left leg on what coach Van Fleet argued was an uncalled clipping penalty. Middlekauff had only just returned to the team.

==== 1926 ====
Middlekauff returned in 1926.

==== 1927 ====
He was captain of the team in 1927, elected after the regular captain Frank Oosterhoudt was declared ineligible. The season started poorly including an 0–12 upset to Davidson before Middlekauff was elected captain, and was much better afterwards. Aside from Davidson the Gators lost only to Jack McDowall's SoCon champion NC State Wolfpack and the Georgia Bulldogs' "dream and wonder team." Against Georgia he aggravated an injury. He was the only player of the Gators selected All-Southern that year. In an all-star game of Pacific Coast stars against Southern stars hampered by rain, Middlekauff got the only score of the game in an 8–0 victory for the South.

== Boxing ==
After practicing law in Miami for a short time, Middlekauff was a professional boxer, scoring several knockouts. In a professional boxing career as a heavyweight, he had record of 6 Wins (5 by knockout) 7 Losses (5 by knockout) and 1 Draw in 14 bouts.

== Wrestling ==
Middlekauff also wrestled professionally from 1930 to 1946. He once met former Georgia Tech fullback Doug Wycoff in a match, the main event at the Atlanta Municipal Auditorium for Georgia Championship Wrestling promoter Henry Weber. Wycoff won the contest.

One account reads "Bill has a habit of hurling his 235 pounds of brawn at his rival to bring him down almost exactly as he did in blocking a would-be tackler out of the play during his football days."

== See also ==
- 1927 College Football All-Southern Team
