= 1927 Florida Gators football team =

American college football season

1927 Florida Gators football
- Conference: Southern Conference
- Record: 7–3 (5–2 SoCon)
- Head coach: Harold Sebring (3rd season)
- Offensive scheme: Notre Dame Box
- Captain: Bill Middlekauff
- Home stadium: Fleming Field

Uniform
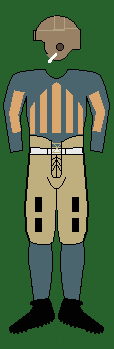

1927 Southern Conference football standings
	Conf.					Overall
Team	W		L		T	W		L		T
Georgia Tech +	7	–	0	–	1	8	–	1	–	1
Tennessee +	5	–	0	–	1	8	–	0	–	1
NC State +	4	–	0	–	0	9	–	1	–	0
Vanderbilt	5	–	0	–	2	8	–	1	–	2
No. 8 Georgia	6	–	1	–	0	9	–	1	–	0
Florida	5	–	2	–	0	7	–	3	–	0
Ole Miss	3	–	2	–	0	5	–	3	–	1
Virginia	4	–	4	–	0	5	–	4	–	0
Clemson	2	–	2	–	0	5	–	3	–	1
Alabama	3	–	4	–	1	5	–	4	–	1
LSU	2	–	3	–	1	4	–	4	–	1
Mississippi A&M	2	–	3	–	0	5	–	3	–	0
Washington and Lee	2	–	3	–	0	4	–	4	–	1
VPI	2	–	3	–	0	5	–	4	–	0
Maryland	3	–	5	–	0	4	–	7	–	0
South Carolina	2	–	4	–	0	4	–	5	–	0
VMI	2	–	4	–	0	6	–	4	–	0
Tulane	2	–	5	–	1	2	–	5	–	1
North Carolina	2	–	5	–	0	4	–	6	–	0
Sewanee	1	–	4	–	0	2	–	6	–	0
Kentucky	1	–	5	–	0	3	–	6	–	1
Auburn	0	–	6	–	1	0	–	7	–	2
+ – Conference co-champions; Rankings from Dickinson System

The 1927 Florida Gators football team represented the University of Florida in the sport of American football during the 1927 Southern Conference football season. The season was Harold Sebring's third and last season as the head coach of the Florida Gators football team. After suffering a 0–12 upset loss at the hands of the Davidson College Wildcats, the Gators rallied to defeat the Auburn Tigers 33–6, defeating the Tigers for the first time and ending a six-game losing streak, and to upset coach Wallace Wade's Alabama Crimson Tide 13–6. Sebring's 1927 Florida Gators finished 7–3 overall, and 5–2 in the Southern Conference, placing sixth of twenty-two teams in the conference standings.

The loss to Davidson featured captain Frank Oosterhoudt, who was later declared ineligible, and replaced at captain by Bill Middlekauff. With Middlekauff at captain, the Gators suffered just two further losses: to conference co-champions NC State; and to Georgia's "Dream and Wonder team". NC State was led by Hall of Famer and Gainesville native Jack McDowall.

== Before the season ==
The 1926 season was the worst since the war. "The wolves began to clamor for Sebring's scalp as the 1926 season ended" wrote Pete Norton. With several newcomers, Sebring organized an Orange and Blue game.

== Schedule ==
Date	Opponent	Site	Result	Attendance	Source
September 24	Southern College*	Fleming Field; Gainesville, FL	W 26–7		
October 1	Davidson*	Fleming Field; Gainesville, FL	L 0–12	7,000	
October 8	at Auburn	Drake Field; Auburn, AL (rivalry)	W 33–6		
October 15	vs. Kentucky	Durkee Field; Jacksonville, FL (rivalry)	W 27–6	10,000	
October 23	vs. NC State	Plant Field; Tampa, FL	L 6–12	7,000	
October 30	Mercer*^{†}	Fleming Field; Gainesville, FL	W 32–6	9,000	
November 6	vs. Georgia	Durkee Field; Jacksonville, FL (rivalry)	L 0–28	16,000	
November 12	at Alabama	Cramton Bowl; Montgomery, AL (rivalry)	W 13–6		
November 24	vs. Washington & Lee	Durkee Field; Jacksonville, FL	W 20–7	12,000	
December 3	vs. Maryland	Durkee Field; Jacksonville, FL	W 7–6	2,000	
*Non-conference game; ^{†}Homecoming

== Game summaries ==
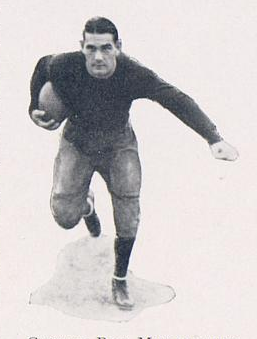
Captain Middlekauff.

=== Week 1: Southern College ===
The first game of the season occurred on September 24 at Fleming Field in Gainesville. The Gators defeated Southern College 26–7.

=== Week 2: Davidson ===
The second week brought the low point of the season–an upset by the Davidson Wildcats. Favored to win by two touchdowns and of superior weight, the Gators lost 12–0. They came within scoring just once, held at the 1-yard line. Despite a limp, Clyde Crabtree was twice sent into the game at crucial moments in hopes of a score. In his first year on the varsity and with a broken wrist, Rainey Cawthon played against Davidson.

On October 4, captain Frank Oosterhoudt was declared ineligible; his replacement by unanimous vote was Bill Middlekauff.

=== Week 3: at Auburn ===
Spurred on by a new captain, the Gators traveled to Auburn and beat the rival Auburn Tigers for the first time 33–6. Bill Middlekauff and Clyde Crabtree were both cited as players of the game. Everett Strupper was referee. Crabtree scored two touchdowns and Middlekauff one Goof Bowyer made the first touchdown, a 44-yard run. Tommy Owens also had a touchdown. Auburn coach Dave Morey resigned.

The Gators' freshmen team also beat Auburn's freshmen team that week.

The starting lineup was: Hodges (left end), Bryan (left tackle), Allen (left guard), Kirschner (center), Reeves (right guard), Clemons (right tackle), Stanley (right end), Brumbaugh (quarterback), Bowyer (left halfback), Bishop (right halfback), Middlekauff (fullback).

=== Week 4: Kentucky ===
Week 4: Kentucky at Florida

Team	1	2	3	4	Total
Kentucky	0	6	0	0	6
• Florida	7	0	13	7	27

- Date: October 15, 1927
- Location: Fairfield Stadium
  Jacksonville, FL
- Game attendance: 10,000

The Gators avenged last year's loss to the Kentucky Wildcats with a 27–6 victory in Jacksonville, outplaying the Wildcats in all but the second quarter. Carl Brumbaugh was sidelined with an injury.

Florida's first touchdown came after some six minutes of play when Bill Middlekauff went over. Florida's final touchdown was on a triple-pass play of Middlekauff to Clyde Crabtree to Dale Van Sickel. In the last half, the Gators made 17 first downs to Kentucky's 11. Goof Bowyer scored a touchdown and drop kicked two extra points to seal the first victory over the Wildcats.

The starting lineup was: DeHoff (left end), Bryan (left tackle), Reeves (left guard), Kirschner (center), Allen (right guard), Clemons (right tackle), Stanley (right end), Bowyer (quarterback), Beck (left halfback), Bishop (right halfback), Middlekauff (fullback).

=== Week 5: North Carolina State ===
Week 5: North Carolina State at Florida

Team	1	2	3	4	Total
• NC State	0	0	0	12	12
Florida	0	0	0	6	6

- Date: October 23, 1927
- Location: Plant Field
  Tampa, FL
- Referee: Springer (Penn)

In the fifth week of play, the Gators faced coach Gus Tebell's North Carolina State Wolfpack on Plant Field in Tampa, losing 12–6. Neither team scored until the final period.

A drive brought the Wolfpack to the 3-yard line, the feature play of which was a 30-yard pass from their Hall of Fame captain, Gainesville native Jack McDowall to Childress. A pass from McDowall to Frank Goodwin got the score. The Gators then began passing desperately in an attempt to win. A pass bounced off the hands of a Florida back and into McDowall's, who returned the ball 75 yards for the deciding score. On the ensuing kickoff, Gator back Tommy Owens ran it back for an 88-yard touchdown.

Since McDowall had been turned down by his native University of Florida, legend has it just afterwards he mailed Sebring the game ball.

The starting lineup was: Van Sickel (left end), Bryan (left tackle), Allen (left guard), Kirschner (center), Reeves (right guard), Clemons (right tackle), Stanley (right end), Bowyer (quarterback), Beck (left halfback), Yancey (right halfback), Middlekauff (fullback).

=== Week 6: Mercer ===
For homecoming, some 9,000 watched Florida beat the Mercer Bears 32–6. Rainey Cawthon once completed a 53-yard pass during the game. Florida's five touchdowns were scored by: Bill Middlekauff, Willie DeHoff, Cecil Beck, Spic Stanley, and Goof Bowyer. Mercer's Phoney Smith had a 65-yard touchdown run. Middlekauff made the first score of the contest.

=== Week 7: Georgia ===
Week 7: Florida vs. Georgia

Team	1	2	3	4	Total
Florida	0	0	0	0	0
• Georgia	0	7	14	7	28

- Date: November 5, 1927
- Location: Barrs Field
  Jacksonville, FL
- Game attendance: 16,000

The "Dream and wonder team" beat the Gators 28–0 after leading just 7 to 0 at the half. "It was made by Georgia's famous touchdown pass that later wrecked Alabama and had wrecked Yale. This pass started out like a cross buck but finished with Johnson having tossed the ball to McCrary over the goal line."

Quarterback Goof Bowyer broke his leg in the game. Middlekauff entered the game with an injury, and aggravated it further.

The starting lineup was: Dehoff (left end), Bryan (left tackle), Allen (left guard), Kirchner (center), Reeves (right guard), Clemons (right tackle), Stanley (right end), Bowyer (quarterback), Brumbaugh (left halfback), Bishop (right halfback), Middlekauff (fullback).

=== Week 8: at Alabama ===
Week 8: Florida at Alabama

Team	1	2	3	4	Total
• Florida	0	7	0	6	13
Alabama	0	0	0	6	6

- Date: November 12, 1927
- Location: Cramton Bowl
  Montgomery, AL

The Gators upset coach Wallace Wade's Alabama Crimson Tide 13–6 in Montgomery. Florida's yearbook remarked: "The South rocked under the great Orange and Blue victory." Clyde Crabtree returned a punt 95 yards for a touchdown early in the second quarter. Alabama's Molton Smith intercepted Crabtree's pass in the fourth quarter and ran for a 45-yard touchdown. After an Alabama penalty, Carl Brumbaugh ran across for the second and decisive touchdown. Crabtree also had two 55-yard kickoff returns, and gained more from scrimmage that afternoon than did the Tide. Crabtree accounted for 271 yards.

The starting lineup was: Stanley (left end), Bryan (left tackle), Allen (left guard), Kirschner (center), Reeves (right guard), Clemons (right tackle), Dehoff (right end), Van Sickle (quarterback), Crabtree (left halfback), Brumbaugh (right halfback), Middlekauff (fullback).

=== Week 9: Washington & Lee ===
Before a crowd of some 12,000 in Jacksonville, Florida beat coach Pat Herron's Washington & Lee Generals 20–7. Dale Van Sickel scored Florida's three touchdowns. The Gators 75-piece band made the trip.

The starting lineup was: VanSickel (left end), Dehoff (left tackle), Allen (left guard), Kirschner (center), Reeves (right guard), Clemons (right tackle), Stanley (right end), Crabtree (quarterback), Owens (left halfback), Brumbaugh (right halfback), Cawthon (fullback).

=== Week 10: Maryland ===
Week 10: Maryland at Florida

Team	1	2	3	4	Total
Maryland	0	6	0	0	6
• Florida	0	7	0	0	7

- Date: December 3, 1927
- Location: Barrs Field
  Jacksonville, FL
- Game attendance: 2,000
- Game weather: Cold rain
- Referee: Ernest C. Quigley

In a cold and driving rain, a placekick for extra point by Dutch Stanley proved the difference in a 7–6 win over coach Curley Byrd's Maryland Terrapins. Six Gators played their final game.

"Playing on a sodden field, unfamiliar to both teams," Florida scored after Clyde Crabtree returned a punt to Maryland's 38-yard line. He and Carl Brumbaugh worked the ball further towards the goal, and Bill Middlekauff carried it over the goal line in the captain's final game. Roberts of Maryland had a 38-yard touchdown run through tackle. The pass for extra point failed, however.

The starting lineup was: Stanley (left end), Clemons (left tackle), Allen (left guard), Kirschner (center), Reeves (right guard), Bryan (right tackle), Van Sickel (right end), Crabtree (quarterback), Brumbaugh (left halfback), Bishop (right halfback), Middlekauff (fullback).

== Postseason ==
Goof Bowyer was elected captain for next year. In no two seasons had Florida won as many conference contests as in 1927. Sebring resigned to get married and practice law. He graduated from the university's College of Law in 1928, and later became a circuit court judge and chief justice of the Florida Supreme Court. Many sports commentators believe that the team that Sebring recruited for 1928 would become the greatest Gators football squad until at least the 1960s.

== Players ==
=== Depth chart ===
The following chart provides a visual depiction of Florida's lineup during the 1927 season with games started at the position reflected in parentheses. The chart mimics a Notre Dame Box on offense.

LE
Willie DeHoff (2)
Dutch Stanley (2)
Dale Van Sickel (2)
Hodges (1)

LT	LG	C	RG	RT
Joe Bryan (5)	Chester Allen (6)	Tubby Kirchner (7)	Rip Reeves (6)	Jus Clemons (6)
Jus Clemons (1)	Rip Reeves (1)		Chester Allen (1)	Joe Bryan (1)
Willie DeHoff (1)				

RE
Dutch Stanley (5)
Willie DeHoff (1)
Dale Van Sickel (1)

QB
Goof Bowyer (3)
Clyde Crabtree (2)
Carl Brumbaugh (1)
Dale Van Sickel (1)

RHB
Horse Bishop (4)
Carl Brumbaugh (2)
Harvey Yancey (1)

LHB
Cecil Beck (2)
Carl Brumbaugh (2)
Goof Bowyer (1)
Clyde Crabtree (1)
Tommy Owens (1)

FB
Bill Middlekauff (6)
Rainey Cawthon (1)

=== Line ===
Player	Position	Games started	High school	Height	Weight	Age
Chester Allen	guard		Lakeland	6'0"	185	23
Louis Bono	center		Duval	5'10"	178	22
Joe Bryan	tackle		Duval	5'11"	182	22
Jus Clemons	tackle		Plant City	6'0"	184	21
Donald DeHoff
Willie DeHoff	end		Spring Hill	6'0"	170	21
Goldy Goldstein	guard		Duval	6'3"	210	23
Hodges	end					
Tubby Kirchner	center					
Glenn Pless
Alex "Rip" Reeves	guard		Alabama	5'8"	184	21
Mills Smith
Dutch Stanley	end		Hillsborough	5'8"	181	21
Charlie Tucker
Dale Van Sickel	end		Gainesville	5'11"	170	19

=== Backfield ===
Player	Position	Games started	High school	Height	Weight	Age
Cecil Beck	halfback					
Horse Bishop	halfback					
Goof Bowyer	quarterback		Lakeland	5'10"	170	23
Carl Brumbaugh	halfback		West Milton	5'10"	164	20
Rainey Cawthon	fullback		Leon	5'11"	180	19
Clyde Crabtree	quarterback		J. Sterling Morton	5'8"	147	20
Tom "Bull" Fuller	fullback					
Royce Goodbread	halfback		St. Petersburg	6'0"	190	19
Bill Middlekauff	fullback			6'2"	200	22
Tommy Owens	halfback		Quincy	5'11"	146	21
Speedy Walker	halfback		Hillsborough		133	

== Coaching staff ==
- Head coach: Tom Sebring
- Assistants: Joe Bedenk (assistant), Brady Cowell (freshmen), Nash Higgins (chief scout), Alvin Pierson, George Weber

== See also ==
- 1927 College Football All-Southern Team
