= 1927 Vanderbilt Commodores football team =

American college football season

1927 Vanderbilt Commodores football
- Conference: Southern Conference
- Record: 8–1–2 (5–0–2 SoCon)
- Head coach: Dan McGugin (23rd season)
- Captain: Vernon Sharpe
- Home stadium: Dudley Field

Uniform
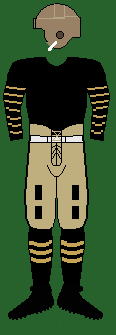

1927 Southern Conference football standings
	Conf.					Overall
Team	W		L		T	W		L		T
Georgia Tech +	7	–	0	–	1	8	–	1	–	1
Tennessee +	5	–	0	–	1	8	–	0	–	1
NC State +	4	–	0	–	0	9	–	1	–	0
Vanderbilt	5	–	0	–	2	8	–	1	–	2
No. 8 Georgia	6	–	1	–	0	9	–	1	–	0
Florida	5	–	2	–	0	7	–	3	–	0
Ole Miss	3	–	2	–	0	5	–	3	–	1
Virginia	4	–	4	–	0	5	–	4	–	0
Clemson	2	–	2	–	0	5	–	3	–	1
Alabama	3	–	4	–	1	5	–	4	–	1
LSU	2	–	3	–	1	4	–	4	–	1
Mississippi A&M	2	–	3	–	0	5	–	3	–	0
Washington and Lee	2	–	3	–	0	4	–	4	–	1
VPI	2	–	3	–	0	5	–	4	–	0
Maryland	3	–	5	–	0	4	–	7	–	0
South Carolina	2	–	4	–	0	4	–	5	–	0
VMI	2	–	4	–	0	6	–	4	–	0
Tulane	2	–	5	–	1	2	–	5	–	1
North Carolina	2	–	5	–	0	4	–	6	–	0
Sewanee	1	–	4	–	0	2	–	6	–	0
Kentucky	1	–	5	–	0	3	–	6	–	1
Auburn	0	–	6	–	1	0	–	7	–	2
+ – Conference co-champions; Rankings from Dickinson System

The 1927 Vanderbilt Commodores football team represented Vanderbilt University in the 1927 Southern Conference football season. The 1927 season was Dan McGugin's 23rd year as head coach. Running back Jimmy Armistead led the nation in scoring in 1927 with 138 points. The team's quarterback was Bill Spears. One fellow wrote Vanderbilt produced "almost certainly the legit top Heisman candidate in Spears, if there had been a Heisman Trophy to award in 1927."

== Schedule ==
Date	Opponent	Site	Result	Attendance	Source
September 24	at Chattanooga*	Chamberlain Field; Chattanooga, TN	W 45–18		
October 1	Ouachita Baptist	Dudley Field; Nashville, TN	W 39–10		
October 8	Centre*	Dudley Field; Nashville, TN	W 53–6		
October 15	at Texas*	Fair Park Stadium; Dallas, TX	L 6–13	18,000	
October 22	Tulane	Dudley Field; Nashville, TN	W 32–0		
October 29	Kentucky	Dudley Field; Nashville, TN (rivalry)	W 34–6	6,000	
November 6	Georgia Tech	Dudley Field; Nashville, TN (rivalry)	T 0–0	17,000	
November 12	at Tennessee	Shields–Watkins Field; Knoxville, TN (rivalry)	T 7–7		
November 19	Maryland	Dudley Field; Nashville, TN	W 39–20	5,000	
November 24	Sewanee	Dudley Field; Nashville, TN (rivalry)	W 26–6		
December 3	at Alabama	Legion Field; Birmingham, AL	W 14–7	20,000	
*Non-conference game

== Game summaries ==
=== Chattanooga ===
Vanderbilt started the season with a 45–18 victory over Chattanooga. Chattanooga did not lose another game and was champion of the Southern Intercollegiate Athletic Association.

=== Ouachita ===
In the second week of play, Ouachita was defeated 39–10.

=== Centre ===
Vanderbilt overwhelmed Centre 53–6.

=== Texas ===
Vanderbilt at Texas

Team	1	2	3	4	Total
Vanderbilt	0	0	0	6	6
• Texas	13	0	0	0	13

- Date: October 15
- Location: Fair Park Stadium
  Dallas
- Game attendance: 18,000
- Referee: Boyton

In Dallas, the Commodores suffered the season's only loss to Texas Longhorns 13–6. Texas scored on a 20-yard pass from Baldwin to Ford, and on a run from Baldwin. Vanderbilt's lone score came on a 16-yard pass to Owens. Spears fought three Texans as he threw the pass.

The starting lineup was Kelly (left end), Lusky (left tackle), Cecil (left guard), V. Sharpe (center), Oliver (right guard), Abernathy (right tackle), Creson (right end), Spears (quarterback), McIlwain (left halfback), Owen (right halfback), Armistead (fullback).

=== Tulane ===
Bernie Bierman thought of ditching his single-wingback formation after the 32–0 win over Tulane, and was convinced to keep it by McGugin.

The starting lineup was Abernathy (left end), Hawkins (left tackle), Kelly (left guard), V. Sharpe (center), Cecil (right guard), Lusky (right tackle), Creson (right end), Spears (quarterback), Owen (left halfback), McIlwain (right halfback), Armistead (fullback).

=== Kentucky ===
Kentucky was beaten 34–6. The starting lineup was James (left end), Hawkins (left tackle), Kelly (left guard), Oliver (center), Cecil (right guard), Lusky (right tackle), Creson (right end), Spears (quarterback), Owen (left halfback), McIlwain (right halfback), Armistead (fullback).

=== Georgia Tech ===
Georgia Tech at Vanderbilt

Team	1	2	3	4	Total
Ga. Tech	0	0	0	0	0
Vanderbilt	0	0	0	0	0

- Date: November 6
- Location: Dudley Field
  Nashville, Tennessee
- Game weather: Wet

A wet field and a strong defense, ranked by one researcher as best in the South, helped Georgia Tech reassert itself and hold Vanderbilt to a scoreless tie, despite the Commodores having the upper hand in play. A strong game had been predicted, showcasing each team's backfield stars in Stumpy Thomason of Tech and Bill Spears of Vanderbilt. Vernon Sharpe suffered a knee injury before the game.

The starting lineup was Abernathy (left end), Hawkins (left tackle), Kelly (left guard), V. Sharpe (center), Cecil (right guard), Lusky (right tackle), Creson (right end), Spears (quarterback), Owen (left halfback), McIlwain (right halfback), Armistead (fullback)

=== Tennessee ===
Vanderbilt at Tennessee

Team	1	2	3	4	Total
Vanderbilt	0	0	0	7	7
Tennessee	0	0	0	7	7

- Date: November 12
- Location: Knoxville, Tennessee

Robert Neyland was hired to coach Tennessee in 1926 by Nathan Dougherty with the explicit goal to "even the score with Vanderbilt", and had his first great team in 1927. McGugin's Commodores led 7–0 until a late Dick Dodson run tied the score. "After the game McGugin questioned each of his players as to his whereabouts during the run. Without exception the players claimed that two men had blocked them. McGugin shrugged. "Well, we'll just protest the play. It's perfectly obvious that Tennessee had twenty-two men on the field."

Vanderbilt center Vernon Sharpe arguably had the better season, but was outperformed by Tennessee's Elvin Butcher.

The starting lineup was Abernathy (left end), Hawkins (left tackle), James (left guard), V. Sharpe (center), Cecil (right guard), Lusky (right tackle), Creson (right end), Spears (quarterback), Owen (left halfback), McIlwain (right halfback), Armistead (fullback).

=== Maryland ===
Spears played only in the first half in the 39–20 win over Maryland, but completed 10 of 12 passes.

=== Sewanee ===
Vanderbilt defeated Sewanee 26–6. The starting lineup was Abernathy (left end), Hawkins (left tackle), Oliver (left guard), V. Sharpe (center), Cecil (right guard), Lusky (right tackle), Creson (right end), Owen (quarterback), McIlwain (left halfback), Sims (right halfback), Armistead (fullback).

=== Alabama ===
Vanderbilt at Alabama

Team	1	2	3	4	Total
• Vanderbilt	7	0	0	7	14
Alabama	0	7	0	0	7

- Date: December 3
- Location: Legion Field
  Birmingham, Alabama
- Game attendance: 20,000

The Commodores faced Wallace Wade's Alabama Crimson Tide in the season finale. Spears gained more than the entire Alabama backfield as the Commodores won 14–7. The highlight of Vanderbilt's first scoring drive was a pass from Spears to Armistead of 20 yards, down to the 3-yard line, from which Armistead later ran it in. On Alabama's scoring drive, Red Brown ran 23 yards on a reverse, down to the 4-yard line. Tony Holm eventually got the score. In the fourth quarter, Spears led the winning drive, once circling end for 34 yards, tackling by Starling just as he seemed to break free. He then passed to Larry Creson for 10 yards, ran for 6, and then 13 more around end to the 16-yard line. After Spears and Armistead worked it down to the 9-yard line, a pass to Roy Gibson got the touchdown.

== After the season ==
Spears passed for 1,207 yards and 9 touchdowns. An all-senior football team at the end of the year used Vandy's offensive system.

== Personnel ==
=== Coaching staff ===
- Dan McGugin (Michigan '03), head coach
- Johnny "Red" Floyd (Vanderbilt '20), assistant coach
- Lewie Hardage (Vanderbilt '12), backfield coach
- Hek Wakefield (Vanderbilt '24), end coach
- Gus Morrow (Vanderbilt '22), line coach
