= 1927 Maryland Aggies football team =

American college football season

1927 Maryland Aggies football
- Conference: Southern Conference
- Record: 4–7 (3–5 SoCon)
- Head coach: Curley Byrd (17th season)
- Home stadium: Byrd Stadium (original)

1927 Southern Conference football standings
	Conf.					Overall
Team	W		L		T	W		L		T
Georgia Tech +	7	–	0	–	1	8	–	1	–	1
Tennessee +	5	–	0	–	1	8	–	0	–	1
NC State +	4	–	0	–	0	9	–	1	–	0
Vanderbilt	5	–	0	–	2	8	–	1	–	2
No. 8 Georgia	6	–	1	–	0	9	–	1	–	0
Florida	5	–	2	–	0	7	–	3	–	0
Ole Miss	3	–	2	–	0	5	–	3	–	1
Virginia	4	–	4	–	0	5	–	4	–	0
Clemson	2	–	2	–	0	5	–	3	–	1
Alabama	3	–	4	–	1	5	–	4	–	1
LSU	2	–	3	–	1	4	–	4	–	1
Mississippi A&M	2	–	3	–	0	5	–	3	–	0
Washington and Lee	2	–	3	–	0	4	–	4	–	1
VPI	2	–	3	–	0	5	–	4	–	0
Maryland	3	–	5	–	0	4	–	7	–	0
South Carolina	2	–	4	–	0	4	–	5	–	0
VMI	2	–	4	–	0	6	–	4	–	0
Tulane	2	–	5	–	1	2	–	5	–	1
North Carolina	2	–	5	–	0	4	–	6	–	0
Sewanee	1	–	4	–	0	2	–	6	–	0
Kentucky	1	–	5	–	0	3	–	6	–	1
Auburn	0	–	6	–	1	0	–	7	–	2
+ – Conference co-champions; Rankings from Dickinson System

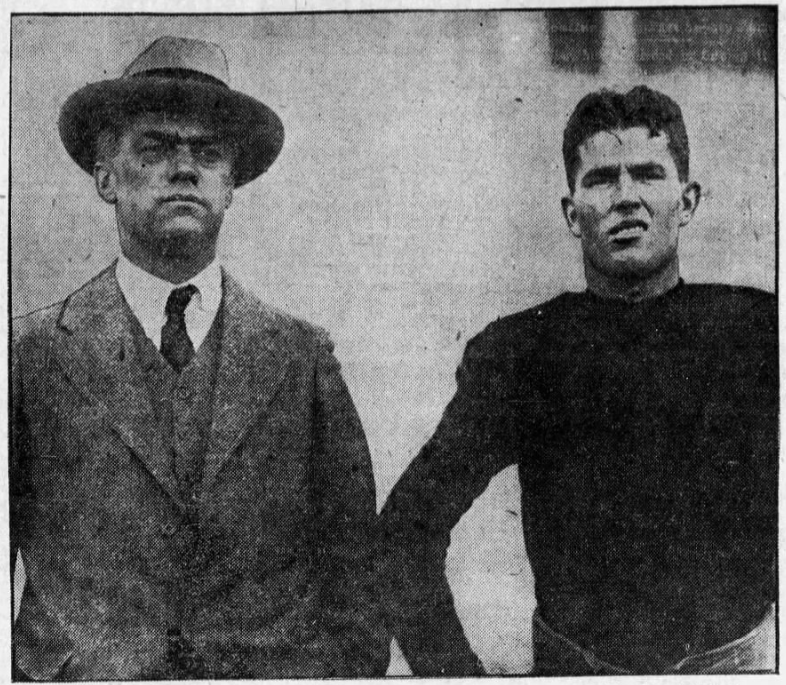
Coach Curly Byrd (left) and Harold Bafford (captain & center) of the Maryland Terrapins

The 1927 Maryland Aggies football team represented the University of Maryland in the 1927 college football season. In their 17th season under head coach Curley Byrd, the Aggies compiled a 4–7 record (3–5 in conference), finished in 15th place in the Southern Conference, and outscored their opponents 186 to 144.

== Schedule ==
Date	Opponent	Site	Result	Source
September 24	Washington College (MD)*	Byrd Stadium; College Park, MD	W 79–0	
October 1	South Carolina	Byrd Stadium; College Park, MD	W 26–0	
October 8	at North Carolina	Emerson Field; Chapel Hill, NC	L 6–7	
October 15	vs. VPI	League Park; Norfolk, VA	W 13–7	
October 22	vs. VMI	Tate Field; Richmond, VA	W 10–6	
October 29	Washington and Lee	Byrd Stadium; College Park, MD	L 6–13	
November 5	at Yale*	Yale Bowl; New Haven, CT	L 6–30	
November 12	at Virginia	Lambeth Field; Charlottesville, VA (rivalry)	L 0–21	
November 19	at Vanderbilt	Dudley Field; Nashville, TN	L 20–39	
November 24	vs. Johns Hopkins*	Baltimore Stadium; Baltimore, MD	L 13–14	
December 3	at Florida	Durkee Field; Jacksonville, FL	L 6–7	
*Non-conference game
