= 1927 Tennessee Volunteers football team =

American college football season

1927 Tennessee Volunteers football

SoCon co-champion
- Conference: Southern Conference
- Record: 8–0–1 (5–0–1 SoCon)
- Head coach: Robert Neyland (2nd season)
- Offensive scheme: Single-wing
- Captain: John Barnhill
- Home stadium: Shields–Watkins Field

1927 Southern Conference football standings
	Conf.					Overall
Team	W		L		T	W		L		T
Georgia Tech +	7	–	0	–	1	8	–	1	–	1
Tennessee +	5	–	0	–	1	8	–	0	–	1
NC State +	4	–	0	–	0	9	–	1	–	0
Vanderbilt	5	–	0	–	2	8	–	1	–	2
No. 8 Georgia	6	–	1	–	0	9	–	1	–	0
Florida	5	–	2	–	0	7	–	3	–	0
Ole Miss	3	–	2	–	0	5	–	3	–	1
Virginia	4	–	4	–	0	5	–	4	–	0
Clemson	2	–	2	–	0	5	–	3	–	1
Alabama	3	–	4	–	1	5	–	4	–	1
LSU	2	–	3	–	1	4	–	4	–	1
Mississippi A&M	2	–	3	–	0	5	–	3	–	0
Washington and Lee	2	–	3	–	0	4	–	4	–	1
VPI	2	–	3	–	0	5	–	4	–	0
Maryland	3	–	5	–	0	4	–	7	–	0
South Carolina	2	–	4	–	0	4	–	5	–	0
VMI	2	–	4	–	0	6	–	4	–	0
Tulane	2	–	5	–	1	2	–	5	–	1
North Carolina	2	–	5	–	0	4	–	6	–	0
Sewanee	1	–	4	–	0	2	–	6	–	0
Kentucky	1	–	5	–	0	3	–	6	–	1
Auburn	0	–	6	–	1	0	–	7	–	2
+ – Conference co-champions; Rankings from Dickinson System

The 1927 Tennessee Volunteers football team (variously "Tennessee", "UT" or the "Vols") represented the University of Tennessee in the 1927 Southern Conference football season. Playing as a member of the Southern Conference (SoCon), the team was led by head coach Robert Neyland, in his second year, and played their home games at Shields–Watkins Field in Knoxville, Tennessee. The 1927 Vols won eight, lost zero and tied one game (8–0–1 overall, 5–0–1 in the SoCon). The only blemish on Tennessee's schedule was a tie with in-state rival, Vanderbilt. Playing seven home games, the 1927 Vols outscored their opponents 246 to 26 and posted seven shutouts.

== Before the season ==
Robert Neyland was hired to coach Tennessee in 1926 by Nathan Dougherty with the explicit goal to "even the score with Vanderbilt", and had his first great team in 1927.

== Schedule ==
Date	Opponent	Site	Result	Source
September 24	Carson–Newman*	Shields–Watkins Field; Knoxville, TN	W 33–0	
October 1	at North Carolina	Emerson Field; Chapel Hill, NC	W 26–0	
October 8	Maryville (TN)*	Shields–Watkins Field; Knoxville, TN	W 7–0	
October 15	Ole Miss	Shields–Watkins Field; Knoxville, TN (rivalry)	W 21–7	
October 22	Transylvania*	Shields–Watkins Field; Knoxville, TN	W 57–0	
October 29	Virginia	Shields–Watkins Field; Knoxville, TN	W 42–0	
November 5	Sewanee	Shields–Watkins Field; Knoxville, TN	W 32–12	
November 12	Vanderbilt^{†}	Shields–Watkins Field; Knoxville, TN (rivalry)	T 7–7	
November 24	at Kentucky	McLean Stadium; Lexington, KY (rivalry)	W 20–0	
*Non-conference game; ^{†}Homecoming

== Game summaries ==
=== Carson–Newman ===
In the season opener, Tennessee beat in-state opponent Carson–Newman 33–0.

=== North Carolina ===
In the second week of play, Tennessee defeated UNC 26–0. The starting lineup was Lowe (left end), McArthur (left tackle), F. Johnson (left guard), Butcher (center), Burgers (right guard), Hundley (right tackle), Alley (right end), Elmore (quarterback), Derryberry (left halfback), Witt (right halfback), Dodson (fullback).

=== Maryville ===
The Vols beat the Maryville Scots 7–0.

=== Ole Miss ===
Tennessee had an easy 21–7 victory over the Ole Miss Rebels, weakening in the last quarter for the first touchdown scored on the Vols. Passes from Witt and runs by Dodson got Tennessee's scores.

The starting lineup was McKeen (left end), McArthur (left tackle), Barnhill (left guard), Butcher (center), Tripp (right guard), Elliott (right tackle), Alley (right end), Elmore (quarterback), Derryberry (left halfback), Witt (right halfback), Dodson (fullback).

=== Transylvania ===
The season's fifth shutout, Tennessee beat Transylvania 42–0.

=== Virginia ===
The Volunteers beat the Virginia Cavaliers 42–0. The starting lineup was McKeen (left end), McArthur (left tackle), Barnhill (left guard), Butcher (center), Tripp (right guard), Elliott (right tackle), Alley (right end), Elmore (quarterback), Derryberry (left halfback), Witt (right halfback), Dodson (fullback).

=== Sewanee ===
Tennessee beat Sewanee 32–12. The starting lineup was McKeen (left end), McArthur (left tackle), Barnhill (left guard), Butcher (center), Tripp (right guard), H. Johnson (right tackle), Alley (right end), Tudor (quarterback), Derryberry (left halfback), Witt (right halfback), Dodson (fullback).

=== Vanderbilt ===
Vanderbilt at Tennessee

Team	1	2	3	4	Total
Vanderbilt	0	0	0	7	7
Tennessee	0	0	0	7	7

- Date: November 12
- Location: Knoxville, Tennessee

McGugin's Commodores led 7–0 until a late Dick Dodson run tied the score. "After the game McGugin questioned each of his players as to his whereabouts during the run. Without exception the players claimed that two men had blocked them. McGugin shrugged. "Well, we'll just protest the play. It's perfectly obvious that Tennessee had twenty-two men on the field."

Vanderbilt center Vernon Sharpe arguably had the better season, but was outperformed by Tennessee's Elvin Butcher. The starting lineup was McKeen (left end), McArthur (left tackle), Barnhill (left guard), Butcher (center), Tripp (right guard), H. Johnson (right tackle), Alley (right end), Elmore (quarterback), Derryberry (left halfback), Witt (right halfback), Dodson (fullback).

=== Kentucky ===
To close the season, the Volunteers shutout the Kentucky Wildcats 20–0. The starting lineup was McKeen (left end), McArthur (left tackle), Barnhill (left guard), Butcher (center), Tripp (right guard), H. Johnson (right tackle), Alley (right end), Elmore (quarterback), Witt (left halfback), Derryberry (right halfback), Dodson (fullback).

== Postseason ==
Coach Alexander of Tech wrote Neyland to accept a co-championship, and no Pickens Cup was awarded.

== Players ==
=== Line ===
Number	Player	Position	Games started	Hometown	Prep school	Height	Weight	Age
29	George Abernathy	center						
41	Scott Alden	guard						
25	Herc Alley	end						
24	John Barnhill	guard		Savannah, Tennessee			175	
34	Ed Burgess	guard						
23	Elvin Butcher	center		Knoxville, Tennessee			184	
32	Joe Bybee	end						
40	Frank Elliott	tackle						
37	Jim Finney	center						
53	Ben Fuller	guard						
44	Louis Green	tackle						
54	Houston Herndon	end						
30	Hobart Hooser	guard						
35	Bo Hundley	tackle						
46	Xen Hunt	tackle						
20	Farmer Johnson	guard						
22	Howard Johnson	tackle						
33	Ted Lowe	end						
18	Dave McArthur	tackle						
26	Allyn McKeen	end						
36	Harry Meyer	end						
27	Arthur Tripp	guard						
43	George Wiggs	center						

=== Backfield ===
Number	Player	Position	Games started	Hometown	Prep school	Height	Weight	Age
15	E. Derryberry	halfback						
13	Dick Dodson	fullback			Peabody Academy		180	
52	Jimmy Dykes	halfback						
12	Jimmy Elmore	quarterback						
16	Amos Horner	fullback						
51	Clyde Keltner	halfback						
49	Carl Reischling	halfback						
21	Amos Trotter	halfback						
19	Vincent Tudor	quarterback						
14	Roy Witt	halfback						
17	Ed Young	halfback						
