= Harry Lightsey =

American football player, coach, politician, and judge (1901–1986)

Biographical details
- Born: February 3, 1901; Brunson, South Carolina, U.S.
- Died: February 24, 1986 (aged 85); Columbia, South Carolina, U.S.

Playing career
- 1919–1922: South Carolina
- Position: Guard

Coaching career (HC unless noted)
- 1923–1926: Columbia HS (SC)
- 1927: South Carolina

Head coaching record
- Overall: 4–5 (college)

Accomplishments and honors

Championships
- 3 South Carolina State HS

Harry McKinley Lightsey Sr. (February 3, 1901 – February 24, 1986) was an American college football player and coach, politician, and judge. He served as the head football coach at the University of South Carolina in Columbia, South Carolina in 1927, compiling a record of 4–5.

== Head coaching record ==
=== College ===
Year	Team	Overall	Conference	Standing	Bowl/playoffs
South Carolina Gamecocks (Southern Conference) (1927)
1927	South Carolina	4–5	2–4	T–16th	
South Carolina:		4–5	2–4		
Total:		4–5			
