= 1927 North Carolina Tar Heels football team =

American college football season

1927 North Carolina Tar Heels football
- Conference: Southern Conference
- Record: 4–6 (2–5 SoCon)
- Head coach: Chuck Collins (2nd season)
- Captain: Garrett Morehead
- Home stadium: Emerson Field; Kenan Memorial Stadium

1927 Southern Conference football standings
	Conf.					Overall
Team	W		L		T	W		L		T
Georgia Tech +	7	–	0	–	1	8	–	1	–	1
Tennessee +	5	–	0	–	1	8	–	0	–	1
NC State +	4	–	0	–	0	9	–	1	–	0
Vanderbilt	5	–	0	–	2	8	–	1	–	2
No. 8 Georgia	6	–	1	–	0	9	–	1	–	0
Florida	5	–	2	–	0	7	–	3	–	0
Ole Miss	3	–	2	–	0	5	–	3	–	1
Virginia	4	–	4	–	0	5	–	4	–	0
Clemson	2	–	2	–	0	5	–	3	–	1
Alabama	3	–	4	–	1	5	–	4	–	1
LSU	2	–	3	–	1	4	–	4	–	1
Mississippi A&M	2	–	3	–	0	5	–	3	–	0
Washington and Lee	2	–	3	–	0	4	–	4	–	1
VPI	2	–	3	–	0	5	–	4	–	0
Maryland	3	–	5	–	0	4	–	7	–	0
South Carolina	2	–	4	–	0	4	–	5	–	0
VMI	2	–	4	–	0	6	–	4	–	0
Tulane	2	–	5	–	1	2	–	5	–	1
North Carolina	2	–	5	–	0	4	–	6	–	0
Sewanee	1	–	4	–	0	2	–	6	–	0
Kentucky	1	–	5	–	0	3	–	6	–	1
Auburn	0	–	6	–	1	0	–	7	–	2
+ – Conference co-champions; Rankings from Dickinson System

The 1927 North Carolina Tar Heels football team represented the University of North Carolina in the 1927 college football season. The Tar Heels defeated Davidson College 27–0 in the inaugural game at Kenan Memorial Stadium.

== Schedule ==
Date	Time	Opponent	Site	Result	Attendance	Source
September 24	3:00 p.m.	Wake Forest*	Emerson Field; Chapel Hill, NC (rivalry)	L 8–9	12,000	
October 1	3:00 p.m.	Tennessee	Emerson Field; Chapel Hill, NC	L 0–26	7,000	
October 8	3:00 p.m.	Maryland	Emerson Field; Chapel Hill, NC	W 7–6	5,000	
October 15	3:00 p.m.	at South Carolina	Melton Field; Columbia, SC (rivalry)	L 6–14	7,000	
October 22	2:00 p.m.	at Georgia Tech	Grant Field; Atlanta, GA	L 0–13	13,000	
October 29	2:30 p.m.	at NC State	Riddick Field; Raleigh, NC (rivalry)	L 6–19	12,000	
November 5	11:00 a.m.	at VMI	Alumni Field; Lexington, VA	L 0–7	6,000	
November 12	2:00 p.m.	Davidson*	Kenan Memorial Stadium; Chapel Hill, NC	W 27–0	9,000	
November 19	2:00 p.m.	at Duke*	Hanes Field; Durham, NC (rivalry)	W 18–0		
November 24	2:00 p.m.	Virginia	Kenan Memorial Stadium; Chapel Hill, NC (South's Oldest Rivalry)	W 14–13	27,000–28,000	
*Non-conference game; All times are in Eastern time
