= 1927 LSU Tigers football team =

American college football season

1927 LSU Tigers football
- Conference: Southern Conference
- Record: 4–4–1 (2–3–1 SoCon)
- Head coach: Mike Donahue (5th season)
- MVP: Babe Godfrey
- Captain: Babe Godfrey
- Home stadium: Tiger Stadium

1927 Southern Conference football standings
	Conf.					Overall
Team	W		L		T	W		L		T
Georgia Tech +	7	–	0	–	1	8	–	1	–	1
Tennessee +	5	–	0	–	1	8	–	0	–	1
NC State +	4	–	0	–	0	9	–	1	–	0
Vanderbilt	5	–	0	–	2	8	–	1	–	2
No. 8 Georgia	6	–	1	–	0	9	–	1	–	0
Florida	5	–	2	–	0	7	–	3	–	0
Ole Miss	3	–	2	–	0	5	–	3	–	1
Virginia	4	–	4	–	0	5	–	4	–	0
Clemson	2	–	2	–	0	5	–	3	–	1
Alabama	3	–	4	–	1	5	–	4	–	1
LSU	2	–	3	–	1	4	–	4	–	1
Mississippi A&M	2	–	3	–	0	5	–	3	–	0
Washington and Lee	2	–	3	–	0	4	–	4	–	1
VPI	2	–	3	–	0	5	–	4	–	0
Maryland	3	–	5	–	0	4	–	7	–	0
South Carolina	2	–	4	–	0	4	–	5	–	0
VMI	2	–	4	–	0	6	–	4	–	0
Tulane	2	–	5	–	1	2	–	5	–	1
North Carolina	2	–	5	–	0	4	–	6	–	0
Sewanee	1	–	4	–	0	2	–	6	–	0
Kentucky	1	–	5	–	0	3	–	6	–	1
Auburn	0	–	6	–	1	0	–	7	–	2
+ – Conference co-champions; Rankings from Dickinson System

The 1927 LSU Tigers football team was an American football team that represented Louisiana State University (LSU) as a member of the Southern Conference during the 1927 college football season. In their fifth season under head coach Mike Donahue, LSU compiled a 4–4–1 record.

Tackle Jess Tinsley became the first LSU player selected as a first team All-Southern player since 1919.

== Schedule ==
Date	Opponent	Site	Result	Attendance	Source
September 24	Louisiana Tech*	Tiger Stadium; Baton Rouge, LA	W 45–0		
October 1	Southwestern Louisiana*	Tiger Stadium; Baton Rouge, LA	W 52–0		
October 8	at Alabama	Rickwood Field; Birmingham, AL (rivalry)	T 0–0	12,000	
October 15	at Auburn	Cramton Bowl; Montgomery, AL (rivalry)	W 9–0		
October 22	at Mississippi A&M	Mississippi State Fairgrounds; Jackson, MS (rivalry)	W 9–7		
October 29	vs. Arkansas*	State Fair Stadium; Shreveport, LA (rivalry)	L 0–28	12,000	
November 5	at Ole Miss	Hemingway Stadium; Oxford, MS (rivalry)	L 7–12		
November 12	at Georgia Tech	Grant Field; Atlanta, GA	L 0–23		
November 24	Tulane	Tiger Stadium; Baton Rouge, LA (Battle for the Rag)	L 6–13	20,000	
*Non-conference game
