= 1927 Kentucky Wildcats football team =

American college football season

1927 Kentucky Wildcats football
- Conference: Southern Conference
- Record: 3–6–1 (1–5 SoCon)
- Head coach: Harry Gamage (1st season)
- Captain: Charles Wert
- Home stadium: Stoll Field

1927 Southern Conference football standings
	Conf.					Overall
Team	W		L		T	W		L		T
Georgia Tech +	7	–	0	–	1	8	–	1	–	1
Tennessee +	5	–	0	–	1	8	–	0	–	1
NC State +	4	–	0	–	0	9	–	1	–	0
Vanderbilt	5	–	0	–	2	8	–	1	–	2
No. 8 Georgia	6	–	1	–	0	9	–	1	–	0
Florida	5	–	2	–	0	7	–	3	–	0
Ole Miss	3	–	2	–	0	5	–	3	–	1
Virginia	4	–	4	–	0	5	–	4	–	0
Clemson	2	–	2	–	0	5	–	3	–	1
Alabama	3	–	4	–	1	5	–	4	–	1
LSU	2	–	3	–	1	4	–	4	–	1
Mississippi A&M	2	–	3	–	0	5	–	3	–	0
Washington and Lee	2	–	3	–	0	4	–	4	–	1
VPI	2	–	3	–	0	5	–	4	–	0
Maryland	3	–	5	–	0	4	–	7	–	0
South Carolina	2	–	4	–	0	4	–	5	–	0
VMI	2	–	4	–	0	6	–	4	–	0
Tulane	2	–	5	–	1	2	–	5	–	1
North Carolina	2	–	5	–	0	4	–	6	–	0
Sewanee	1	–	4	–	0	2	–	6	–	0
Kentucky	1	–	5	–	0	3	–	6	–	1
Auburn	0	–	6	–	1	0	–	7	–	2
+ – Conference co-champions; Rankings from Dickinson System

The 1927 Kentucky Wildcats football team was an American football team that represented the University of Kentucky as a member of the Southern Conference (SoCon) during the 1926 season. In their first season under head coach Harry Gamage, Kentucky compiled an overall record of 3–6–1 with a mark of 1–5 in conference play, placing 21st in the SoCon.

== Schedule ==
Date	Opponent	Site	Result	Attendance	Source
September 24	Maryville (TN)*	Stoll Field; Lexington, KY	T 6–6		
October 1	Indiana*	Stoll Field; Lexington, KY (rivalry)	L 0–21		
October 8	Kentucky Wesleyan*	Stoll Field; Lexington, KY	W 13–7		
October 15	vs. Florida	Durkee Field; Jacksonville, FL (rivalry)	L 6–27	10,000	
October 22	Washington and Lee	Stoll Field; Lexington, KY	L 0–25		
October 29	at Vanderbilt	Dudley Field; Nashville, TN	L 6–34	6,000	
November 5	at Alabama	Rickwood Field; Birmingham, AL	L 6–21		
November 12	vs. VMI	Laidley Field; Charleston, WV	W 25–0		
November 19	at Centre*	Farris Stadium; Danville, KY (rivalry)	W 53–0		
November 24	Tennessee	Stoll Field; Lexington, KY (rivalry)	L 0–20	7,500	
*Non-conference game
