= 1927 Auburn Tigers football team =

American college football season

1927 Auburn Tigers football
- Conference: Southern Conference
- Record: 0–7–2 (0–6–1 SoCon)
- Head coach: Dave Morey (3rd season; first 3 games); Boozer Pitts (3rd season; final 6 games)
- Home stadium: Drake Field; Rickwood Field; Cramton Bowl

1927 Southern Conference football standings
	Conf.					Overall
Team	W		L		T	W		L		T
Georgia Tech +	7	–	0	–	1	8	–	1	–	1
Tennessee +	5	–	0	–	1	8	–	0	–	1
NC State +	4	–	0	–	0	9	–	1	–	0
Vanderbilt	5	–	0	–	2	8	–	1	–	2
No. 8 Georgia	6	–	1	–	0	9	–	1	–	0
Florida	5	–	2	–	0	7	–	3	–	0
Ole Miss	3	–	2	–	0	5	–	3	–	1
Virginia	4	–	4	–	0	5	–	4	–	0
Clemson	2	–	2	–	0	5	–	3	–	1
Alabama	3	–	4	–	1	5	–	4	–	1
LSU	2	–	3	–	1	4	–	4	–	1
Mississippi A&M	2	–	3	–	0	5	–	3	–	0
Washington and Lee	2	–	3	–	0	4	–	4	–	1
VPI	2	–	3	–	0	5	–	4	–	0
Maryland	3	–	5	–	0	4	–	7	–	0
South Carolina	2	–	4	–	0	4	–	5	–	0
VMI	2	–	4	–	0	6	–	4	–	0
Tulane	2	–	5	–	1	2	–	5	–	1
North Carolina	2	–	5	–	0	4	–	6	–	0
Sewanee	1	–	4	–	0	2	–	6	–	0
Kentucky	1	–	5	–	0	3	–	6	–	1
Auburn	0	–	6	–	1	0	–	7	–	2
+ – Conference co-champions; Rankings from Dickinson System

The 1927 Auburn Tigers football team represented Auburn University in the 1927 college football season. The Tigers' were led by head coach Dave Morey in his second season for the first three games and then by Boozer Pitts to finish the season with a record of zero wins, seven losses and two ties (0–7–2 overall, 0–6–1 in the SoCon). The loss to Stetson was the first on Auburn's campus since 1908.

== Schedule ==
Date	Opponent	Site	Result	Attendance	Source
September 24	Stetson*	Drake Field; Auburn, AL	L 0–6		
October 1	at Clemson	Riggs Field; Clemson, SC (rivalry)	L 0–3		
October 8	Florida^{†}	Drake Field; Auburn, AL (rivalry)	L 0–33		
October 15	LSU	Cramton Bowl; Montgomery, AL (rivalry)	L 0–9		
October 22	vs. Georgia	Memorial Stadium; Columbus, GA (rivalry)	L 3–33		
October 29	at Howard (AL)*	Rickwood Field; Birmingham, AL	T 9–9		
November 5	at Tulane	Tulane Stadium; New Orleans, LA (rivalry)	T 6–6		
November 12	Mississippi A&M	Rickwood Field; Birmingham, AL	L 6–7		
November 24	at Georgia Tech	Grant Field; Atlanta, GA (rivalry)	L 0–18	15,000	
*Non-conference game; ^{†}Homecoming
