= Ed Crowley =

American baseball player (1906–1970)

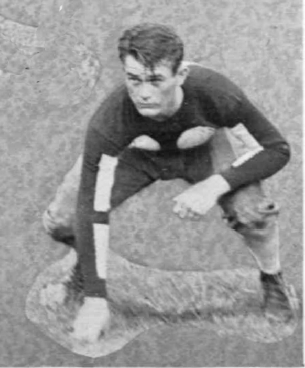
- Third baseman
- Born: August 6, 1906; Watkinsville, Georgia
- Died: April 14, 1970 (aged 63); Birmingham, Alabama
- Batted: Right Threw: Right

MLB debut
- June 21, 1928, for the Washington Senators

Last MLB appearance
- June 23, 1928, for the Washington Senators

MLB statistics
- Batting average: .000
- Games played: 2
- At bats: 1
- Stats at Baseball Reference

Teams
- Washington Senators (1928)

Edgar Jewell Crowley (August 6, 1906 – April 14, 1970) was a Major League Baseball third baseman. He appeared in two games for the Washington Senators in 1928, going hitless in one at bat. He attended the Georgia Institute of Technology, playing baseball and football. He was captain of the Southern Conference champion 1927 football team.
