= 1927 Tulane Green Wave football team =

American college football season

1927 Tulane Green Wave football
- Conference: Southern Conference
- Record: 2–5–1 (2–5–1 SoCon)
- Head coach: Bernie Bierman (1st season)
- Offensive scheme: Single-wing
- Captain: Pat Browne
- Home stadium: Tulane Stadium

1927 Southern Conference football standings
	Conf.					Overall
Team	W		L		T	W		L		T
Georgia Tech +	7	–	0	–	1	8	–	1	–	1
Tennessee +	5	–	0	–	1	8	–	0	–	1
NC State +	4	–	0	–	0	9	–	1	–	0
Vanderbilt	5	–	0	–	2	8	–	1	–	2
No. 8 Georgia	6	–	1	–	0	9	–	1	–	0
Florida	5	–	2	–	0	7	–	3	–	0
Ole Miss	3	–	2	–	0	5	–	3	–	1
Virginia	4	–	4	–	0	5	–	4	–	0
Clemson	2	–	2	–	0	5	–	3	–	1
Alabama	3	–	4	–	1	5	–	4	–	1
LSU	2	–	3	–	1	4	–	4	–	1
Mississippi A&M	2	–	3	–	0	5	–	3	–	0
Washington and Lee	2	–	3	–	0	4	–	4	–	1
VPI	2	–	3	–	0	5	–	4	–	0
Maryland	3	–	5	–	0	4	–	7	–	0
South Carolina	2	–	4	–	0	4	–	5	–	0
VMI	2	–	4	–	0	6	–	4	–	0
Tulane	2	–	5	–	1	2	–	5	–	1
North Carolina	2	–	5	–	0	4	–	6	–	0
Sewanee	1	–	4	–	0	2	–	6	–	0
Kentucky	1	–	5	–	0	3	–	6	–	1
Auburn	0	–	6	–	1	0	–	7	–	2
+ – Conference co-champions; Rankings from Dickinson System

The 1927 Tulane Green Wave football team was an American football team that represented Tulane University as a member of the Southern Conference (SoCon) during the 1927 college football season. In its first year head coach Bernie Bierman, the Green Wave compiled a 2–5–1 (all conference games), finished in 18th place in the SoCon, and was outscored by a total of 120 to 56.

Tulane played its home games at Tulane Stadium in New Orleans.

== Schedule ==
Date	Opponent	Site	Result	Attendance	Source
October 1	Ole Miss	Tulane Stadium; New Orleans, LA (rivalry)	W 19–7		
October 8	at Georgia Tech	Grant Field; Atlanta, GA	L 6–13		
October 15	Mississippi A&M	Tulane Stadium; New Orleans, LA	L 6–13		
October 22	at Vanderbilt	Dudley Field; Nashville, TN	L 0–32		
October 29	Georgia	Tulane Stadium; New Orleans, LA	L 0–31		
November 5	Auburn	Tulane Stadium; New Orleans, LA (rivalry)	T 6–6		
November 12	Sewanee	Tulane Stadium; New Orleans, LA	L 6–12	9,000	
November 24	at LSU	Tiger Stadium; Baton Rouge, LA (Battle for the Rag)	W 13–6	20,000	
