= 1927 Clemson Tigers football team =

American college football season

1927 Clemson Tigers football
- Conference: Southern Conference
- Record: 5–3–1 (2–2 SoCon)
- Head coach: Josh Cody (1st season)
- Captain: Bud Eskew
- Home stadium: Riggs Field

1927 Southern Conference football standings
	Conf.					Overall
Team	W		L		T	W		L		T
Georgia Tech +	7	–	0	–	1	8	–	1	–	1
Tennessee +	5	–	0	–	1	8	–	0	–	1
NC State +	4	–	0	–	0	9	–	1	–	0
Vanderbilt	5	–	0	–	2	8	–	1	–	2
No. 8 Georgia	6	–	1	–	0	9	–	1	–	0
Florida	5	–	2	–	0	7	–	3	–	0
Ole Miss	3	–	2	–	0	5	–	3	–	1
Virginia	4	–	4	–	0	5	–	4	–	0
Clemson	2	–	2	–	0	5	–	3	–	1
Alabama	3	–	4	–	1	5	–	4	–	1
LSU	2	–	3	–	1	4	–	4	–	1
Mississippi A&M	2	–	3	–	0	5	–	3	–	0
Washington and Lee	2	–	3	–	0	4	–	4	–	1
VPI	2	–	3	–	0	5	–	4	–	0
Maryland	3	–	5	–	0	4	–	7	–	0
South Carolina	2	–	4	–	0	4	–	5	–	0
VMI	2	–	4	–	0	6	–	4	–	0
Tulane	2	–	5	–	1	2	–	5	–	1
North Carolina	2	–	5	–	0	4	–	6	–	0
Sewanee	1	–	4	–	0	2	–	6	–	0
Kentucky	1	–	5	–	0	3	–	6	–	1
Auburn	0	–	6	–	1	0	–	7	–	2
+ – Conference co-champions; Rankings from Dickinson System

The 1927 Clemson Tigers football team represented Clemson College—now known as Clemson University—as a member of the Southern Conference (SoCon) during the 1927 college football season. Led by first-year head coach Josh Cody, the Tigers compiled an overall record of 5–3–1 with a mark of 2–2 in conference play, tying for eighth place in the SoCon.

== Schedule ==
Date	Opponent	Site	Result	Attendance	Source
September 24	Presbyterian*	Riggs Field; Calhoun, SC	T 0–0		
October 1	Auburn	Riggs Field; Calhoun, SC (rivalry)	W 3–0		
October 8	at NC State	Riddick Stadium; Raleigh, NC (rivalry)	L 6–18		
October 14	Erskine*	Riggs Field; Calhoun, SC	W 25–6		
October 20	at South Carolina	State Fairgrounds; Columbia, SC (rivalry)	W 20–0	13,000	
October 29	Wofford*	Riggs Field; Calhoun, SC	W 6–0		
November 5	The Citadel*	Johnson Hagood Stadium; Charleston, SC	W 13–0		
November 12	at Georgia	Sanford Field; Athens, GA (rivalry)	L 0–32		
November 24	at Furman*	Manly Field; Greenville, SC	L 0–28		
*Non-conference game
