= V. E. Miles =

American football player (1904–1976)

Virginia Tech Hokies
- Position: Guard

Personal information
- Born: June 2, 1904; Norfolk, Virginia, U.S.
- Died: June 5, 1976; Norfolk, Virginia, U.S.

Career information
- College: VPI (1927)

Awards and highlights
- All-Southern (1927)

Vernon Edward "Buck" Miles (June 2, 1904 – June 5, 1976) was an American college football player for the VPI Gobblers. He was captain of the 1927 team, and selected All-Southern. He played with the Norfolk Shamrocks of the Dixie League.
