= 1927 Mississippi A&M Aggies football team =

American college football season

1927 Mississippi A&M Aggies football
- Conference: Southern Conference
- Record: 5–3 (2–3 SoCon)
- Head coach: John W. Hancock (1st season)
- Captain: Bill Brunson
- Home stadium: Scott Field

1927 Southern Conference football standings
	Conf.					Overall
Team	W		L		T	W		L		T
Georgia Tech +	7	–	0	–	1	8	–	1	–	1
Tennessee +	5	–	0	–	1	8	–	0	–	1
NC State +	4	–	0	–	0	9	–	1	–	0
Vanderbilt	5	–	0	–	2	8	–	1	–	2
No. 8 Georgia	6	–	1	–	0	9	–	1	–	0
Florida	5	–	2	–	0	7	–	3	–	0
Ole Miss	3	–	2	–	0	5	–	3	–	1
Virginia	4	–	4	–	0	5	–	4	–	0
Clemson	2	–	2	–	0	5	–	3	–	1
Alabama	3	–	4	–	1	5	–	4	–	1
LSU	2	–	3	–	1	4	–	4	–	1
Mississippi A&M	2	–	3	–	0	5	–	3	–	0
Washington and Lee	2	–	3	–	0	4	–	4	–	1
VPI	2	–	3	–	0	5	–	4	–	0
Maryland	3	–	5	–	0	4	–	7	–	0
South Carolina	2	–	4	–	0	4	–	5	–	0
VMI	2	–	4	–	0	6	–	4	–	0
Tulane	2	–	5	–	1	2	–	5	–	1
North Carolina	2	–	5	–	0	4	–	6	–	0
Sewanee	1	–	4	–	0	2	–	6	–	0
Kentucky	1	–	5	–	0	3	–	6	–	1
Auburn	0	–	6	–	1	0	–	7	–	2
+ – Conference co-champions; Rankings from Dickinson System

The 1927 Mississippi A&M Aggies football team represented The Agricultural and Mechanical College of the State of Mississippi (now known as Mississippi State University) as a member of the Southern Conference (SoCon) during the 1927 college football season. Led by first-year head coach John W. Hancock, the Aggies played their home games at Scott Field in Starkville, Mississippi. Mississippi A&M finished the season with an overall record of 5–3 and a mark of 2–3 in conference play.

== Schedule ==
Date	Opponent	Site	Result	Attendance	Source
October 1	Birmingham–Southern*	Scott Field; Starkville MS	W 27–0		
October 8	Louisiana Tech*	Scott Field; Starkville MS	W 14–0		
October 15	at Tulane	Tulane Stadium; New Orleans, LA	W 13–6		
October 22	LSU	Mississippi State Fairgrounds; Jackson, MS (rivalry)	L 7–9		
October 29	at Alabama	Denny Stadium; Tuscaloosa, AL (rivalry)	L 7–13	7,000	
November 12	at Auburn	Rickwood Field; Birmingham, AL	W 7–6		
November 18	Millsaps*	Scott Field; Starkville MS	W 6–0		
November 24	at Ole Miss	Hemingway Stadium; Oxford, MS (Egg Bowl)	L 12–20		
*Non-conference game
