= 1927 Virginia Cavaliers football team =

American college football season

1927 Virginia Cavaliers football
- Conference: Southern Conference
- Record: 5–4 (4–4 SoCon)
- Head coach: Greasy Neale (5th season)
- Home stadium: Lambeth Field

1927 Southern Conference football standings
| | Conf. | | | | | Overall |
| Team | W | | L | | T | W | | L | | T |
|---|---|---|---|---|---|---|---|---|---|---|
| Georgia Tech + | 7 | – | 0 | – | 1 | 8 | – | 1 | – | 1 |
| Tennessee + | 5 | – | 0 | – | 1 | 8 | – | 0 | – | 1 |
| NC State + | 4 | – | 0 | – | 0 | 9 | – | 1 | – | 0 |
| Vanderbilt | 5 | – | 0 | – | 2 | 8 | – | 1 | – | 2 |
| No. 8 Georgia | 6 | – | 1 | – | 0 | 9 | – | 1 | – | 0 |
| Florida | 5 | – | 2 | – | 0 | 7 | – | 3 | – | 0 |
| Ole Miss | 3 | – | 2 | – | 0 | 5 | – | 3 | – | 1 |
| Virginia | 4 | – | 4 | – | 0 | 5 | – | 4 | – | 0 |
| Clemson | 2 | – | 2 | – | 0 | 5 | – | 3 | – | 1 |
| Alabama | 3 | – | 4 | – | 1 | 5 | – | 4 | – | 1 |
| LSU | 2 | – | 3 | – | 1 | 4 | – | 4 | – | 1 |
| Mississippi A&M | 2 | – | 3 | – | 0 | 5 | – | 3 | – | 0 |
| Washington and Lee | 2 | – | 3 | – | 0 | 4 | – | 4 | – | 1 |
| VPI | 2 | – | 3 | – | 0 | 5 | – | 4 | – | 0 |
| Maryland | 3 | – | 5 | – | 0 | 4 | – | 7 | – | 0 |
| South Carolina | 2 | – | 4 | – | 0 | 4 | – | 5 | – | 0 |
| VMI | 2 | – | 4 | – | 0 | 6 | – | 4 | – | 0 |
| Tulane | 2 | – | 5 | – | 1 | 2 | – | 5 | – | 1 |
| North Carolina | 2 | – | 5 | – | 0 | 4 | – | 6 | – | 0 |
| Sewanee | 1 | – | 4 | – | 0 | 2 | – | 6 | – | 0 |
| Kentucky | 1 | – | 5 | – | 0 | 3 | – | 6 | – | 1 |
| Auburn | 0 | – | 6 | – | 1 | 0 | – | 7 | – | 2 |
+ – Conference co-champions; Rankings from Dickinson System

The 1927 Virginia Cavaliers football team represented the University of Virginia as a member of the Southern Conference (SoCon) during the 1927 college football season. Led by fifth-year head coach Greasy Neale, the Cavaliers compiled an overall record of 5–4 with a mark of 4–4 in conference play, tying for eighth place in the SoCon. The team played its games at Lambeth Field in Charlottesville, Virginia.

== Schedule ==
| Date | Opponent | Site | Result | Attendance | Source |
|---|---|---|---|---|---|
| September 24 | Hampden–Sydney* | Lambeth Field; Charlottesville, VA | W 38–6 | | |
| October 1 | at Georgia | Sanford Field; Athens, GA | L 0–32 | | |
| October 8 | South Carolina | Lambeth Field; Charlottesville, VA | L 12–13 | | |
| October 15 | VMI^{†} | Lambeth Field; Charlottesville, VA | W 13–8 | | |
| October 22 | VPI | Lambuth Field; Charlottesville, VA (rivalry) | W 7–0 | | |
| October 29 | at Tennessee | Shields–Watkins Field; Knoxville, TN | L 0–42 | | |
| November 5 | at Washington and Lee | Wilson Field; Lexington, VA | W 13–7 | | |
| November 12 | Maryland | Lambuth Field; Charlottesville, VA (rivalry) | W 21–0 | | |
| November 24 | at North Carolina | Kenan Memorial Stadium; Chapel Hill, NC (rivalry) | L 13–14 | 27,000–28,000 | |
*Non-conference game; ^{†}Homecoming
