= 1927 VMI Keydets football team =

American college football season

1927 VMI Keydets football
- Conference: Southern Conference
- Record: 6–4 (2–4 SoCon)
- Head coach: W. C. Raftery (1st season)
- Home stadium: Alumni Field

1927 Southern Conference football standings
| | Conf. | | | | | Overall |
| Team | W | | L | | T | W | | L | | T |
|---|---|---|---|---|---|---|---|---|---|---|
| Georgia Tech + | 7 | – | 0 | – | 1 | 8 | – | 1 | – | 1 |
| Tennessee + | 5 | – | 0 | – | 1 | 8 | – | 0 | – | 1 |
| NC State + | 4 | – | 0 | – | 0 | 9 | – | 1 | – | 0 |
| Vanderbilt | 5 | – | 0 | – | 2 | 8 | – | 1 | – | 2 |
| No. 8 Georgia | 6 | – | 1 | – | 0 | 9 | – | 1 | – | 0 |
| Florida | 5 | – | 2 | – | 0 | 7 | – | 3 | – | 0 |
| Ole Miss | 3 | – | 2 | – | 0 | 5 | – | 3 | – | 1 |
| Virginia | 4 | – | 4 | – | 0 | 5 | – | 4 | – | 0 |
| Clemson | 2 | – | 2 | – | 0 | 5 | – | 3 | – | 1 |
| Alabama | 3 | – | 4 | – | 1 | 5 | – | 4 | – | 1 |
| LSU | 2 | – | 3 | – | 1 | 4 | – | 4 | – | 1 |
| Mississippi A&M | 2 | – | 3 | – | 0 | 5 | – | 3 | – | 0 |
| Washington and Lee | 2 | – | 3 | – | 0 | 4 | – | 4 | – | 1 |
| VPI | 2 | – | 3 | – | 0 | 5 | – | 4 | – | 0 |
| Maryland | 3 | – | 5 | – | 0 | 4 | – | 7 | – | 0 |
| South Carolina | 2 | – | 4 | – | 0 | 4 | – | 5 | – | 0 |
| VMI | 2 | – | 4 | – | 0 | 6 | – | 4 | – | 0 |
| Tulane | 2 | – | 5 | – | 1 | 2 | – | 5 | – | 1 |
| North Carolina | 2 | – | 5 | – | 0 | 4 | – | 6 | – | 0 |
| Sewanee | 1 | – | 4 | – | 0 | 2 | – | 6 | – | 0 |
| Kentucky | 1 | – | 5 | – | 0 | 3 | – | 6 | – | 1 |
| Auburn | 0 | – | 6 | – | 1 | 0 | – | 7 | – | 2 |
+ – Conference co-champions; Rankings from Dickinson System

The 1927 VMI Keydets football team was an American football team that represented the Virginia Military Institute (VMI) during the 1927 college football season, as a member of the Southern Conference. In their first year under head coach W. C. Raftery, the team compiled an overall record of 6–4.

== Schedule ==
| Date | Opponent | Site | Result | Source |
|---|---|---|---|---|
| September 17 | Wofford* | Alumni Field; Lexington, VA | W 37–0 | |
| September 24 | Richmond* | Alumni Field; Lexington, VA (rivalry) | W 22–0 | |
| October 1 | at Georgia Tech | Grant Field; Atlanta, GA | L 0–7 | |
| October 8 | Roanoke* | Alumni Field; Lexington, VA | W 32–0 | |
| October 15 | at Virginia | Lambeth Field; Charlottesville, VA | L 8–13 | |
| October 22 | vs. Maryland | Tate Field; Richmond, VA | L 6–10 | |
| October 29 | at Davidson* | Richardson Field; Davidson, NC | W 20–0 | |
| November 5 | North Carolina | Alumni Field; Lexington, VA | W 7–0 | |
| November 12 | vs. Kentucky | Laidley Field; Charleston, WV | L 0–25 | |
| November 24 | vs. VPI | Maher Field; Roanoke, VA (rivalry) | W 12–9 | |
*Non-conference game
