= 1927 South Carolina Gamecocks football team =

American college football season

1927 South Carolina Gamecocks football
- Conference: Southern Conference
- Record: 4–5 (2–4 SoCon)
- Head coach: Harry Lightsey (1st season)
- Captain: Emmett Wingfield
- Home stadium: Melton Field

1927 Southern Conference football standings
| | Conf. | | | | | Overall |
| Team | W | | L | | T | W | | L | | T |
|---|---|---|---|---|---|---|---|---|---|---|
| Georgia Tech + | 7 | – | 0 | – | 1 | 8 | – | 1 | – | 1 |
| Tennessee + | 5 | – | 0 | – | 1 | 8 | – | 0 | – | 1 |
| NC State + | 4 | – | 0 | – | 0 | 9 | – | 1 | – | 0 |
| Vanderbilt | 5 | – | 0 | – | 2 | 8 | – | 1 | – | 2 |
| No. 8 Georgia | 6 | – | 1 | – | 0 | 9 | – | 1 | – | 0 |
| Florida | 5 | – | 2 | – | 0 | 7 | – | 3 | – | 0 |
| Ole Miss | 3 | – | 2 | – | 0 | 5 | – | 3 | – | 1 |
| Virginia | 4 | – | 4 | – | 0 | 5 | – | 4 | – | 0 |
| Clemson | 2 | – | 2 | – | 0 | 5 | – | 3 | – | 1 |
| Alabama | 3 | – | 4 | – | 1 | 5 | – | 4 | – | 1 |
| LSU | 2 | – | 3 | – | 1 | 4 | – | 4 | – | 1 |
| Mississippi A&M | 2 | – | 3 | – | 0 | 5 | – | 3 | – | 0 |
| Washington and Lee | 2 | – | 3 | – | 0 | 4 | – | 4 | – | 1 |
| VPI | 2 | – | 3 | – | 0 | 5 | – | 4 | – | 0 |
| Maryland | 3 | – | 5 | – | 0 | 4 | – | 7 | – | 0 |
| South Carolina | 2 | – | 4 | – | 0 | 4 | – | 5 | – | 0 |
| VMI | 2 | – | 4 | – | 0 | 6 | – | 4 | – | 0 |
| Tulane | 2 | – | 5 | – | 1 | 2 | – | 5 | – | 1 |
| North Carolina | 2 | – | 5 | – | 0 | 4 | – | 6 | – | 0 |
| Sewanee | 1 | – | 4 | – | 0 | 2 | – | 6 | – | 0 |
| Kentucky | 1 | – | 5 | – | 0 | 3 | – | 6 | – | 1 |
| Auburn | 0 | – | 6 | – | 1 | 0 | – | 7 | – | 2 |
+ – Conference co-champions; Rankings from Dickinson System

The 1927 South Carolina Gamecocks football team was an American football team that represented the University of South Carolina as a member of the Southern Conference (SoCon) during the 1927 college football season. Led by Harry Lightsey in his first and only season as head coach, the Gamecocks compiled an overall record of 4–5 with a mark of 2–4 in conference play, tying for 16th place in the SoCon.

== Schedule ==
| Date | Opponent | Site | Result | Attendance | Source |
|---|---|---|---|---|---|
| September 24 | Erskine* | Melton Field; Columbia, SC | W 13–6 | | |
| October 1 | at Maryland | Byrd Stadium; College Park, MD | L 0–26 | | |
| October 8 | at Virginia | Lambeth Field; Charlottesville, VA | W 13–12 | | |
| October 15 | North Carolina | Melton Field; Columbia, SC (rivalry) | W 14–6 | 7,000 | |
| October 20 | Clemson | State Fairgrounds; Columbia, SC (rivalry) | L 0–20 | 13,000 | |
| October 27 | vs. The Citadel* | County Fairgrounds; Orangeburg, SC | W 6–0 | | |
| November 5 | vs. VPI | Tate Field; Richmond, VA | L 0–35 | | |
| November 12 | at Furman* | Manly Field; Greenville, SC | L 0–33 | | |
| November 24 | NC State | Melton Field; Columbia, SC | L 0–34 | | |
*Non-conference game
