= 1927 Ole Miss Rebels football team =

American college football season

1927 Ole Miss Rebels football
- Conference: Southern Conference
- Record: 5–3–1 (3–2 SoCon)
- Head coach: Homer Hazel (3rd season)
- Captain: Ap Applewhite
- Home stadium: Hemingway Stadium

1927 Southern Conference football standings
	Conf.					Overall
Team	W		L		T	W		L		T
Georgia Tech +	7	–	0	–	1	8	–	1	–	1
Tennessee +	5	–	0	–	1	8	–	0	–	1
NC State +	4	–	0	–	0	9	–	1	–	0
Vanderbilt	5	–	0	–	2	8	–	1	–	2
No. 8 Georgia	6	–	1	–	0	9	–	1	–	0
Florida	5	–	2	–	0	7	–	3	–	0
Ole Miss	3	–	2	–	0	5	–	3	–	1
Virginia	4	–	4	–	0	5	–	4	–	0
Clemson	2	–	2	–	0	5	–	3	–	1
Alabama	3	–	4	–	1	5	–	4	–	1
LSU	2	–	3	–	1	4	–	4	–	1
Mississippi A&M	2	–	3	–	0	5	–	3	–	0
Washington and Lee	2	–	3	–	0	4	–	4	–	1
VPI	2	–	3	–	0	5	–	4	–	0
Maryland	3	–	5	–	0	4	–	7	–	0
South Carolina	2	–	4	–	0	4	–	5	–	0
VMI	2	–	4	–	0	6	–	4	–	0
Tulane	2	–	5	–	1	2	–	5	–	1
North Carolina	2	–	5	–	0	4	–	6	–	0
Sewanee	1	–	4	–	0	2	–	6	–	0
Kentucky	1	–	5	–	0	3	–	6	–	1
Auburn	0	–	6	–	1	0	–	7	–	2
+ – Conference co-champions; Rankings from Dickinson System

The 1927 Ole Miss Rebels football team represented the University of Mississippi (Ole Miss) as a member of the Southern Conference (SoCon) during the 1927 college football season. Led by third-year head coach Homer Hazel, the Rebels compiled an overall record of 5–3–1 with a mark of 3–2 in conference play, and finished seventh in the SoCon. Ole Miss won the first Egg Bowl with a trophy in 1927, led by players Sollie Cohen and V. K. Smith. The team was captained by Ap Applewhite

== Schedule ==
Date	Opponent	Site	Result	Source
September 24	Ozarks (AR)*	Hemingway Stadium; Oxford, MS	W 58–0	
October 1	at Tulane	Tulane Stadium; New Orleans, LA (rivalry)	L 19–7	
October 7	Hendrix*	Hemingway Stadium; Oxford, MS	T 0–0	
October 15	at Tennessee	Shields–Watkins Field; Knoxville, TN (rivalry)	L 21–7	
October 22	at Southwestern (TN)*	Fargason Field; Memphis, TN	W 39–0	
October 29	at Sewanee	McGee Field; Sewanee, TN	W 28–14	
November 5	LSU^{†}	Hemingway Stadium; Oxford, MS (rivalry)	W 12–7	
November 11	Loyola (IL)*	League Park; Jackson, MS	L 7–6	
November 24	Mississippi A&M	Hemingway Stadium; Oxford, MS (Egg Bowl)	W 20–12	
*Non-conference game; ^{†}Homecoming
