= 1927 Washington and Lee Generals football team =

American college football season

1927 Washington and Lee Generals football
- Conference: Southern Conference
- Record: 4–4–1 (2–3 SoCon)
- Head coach: James P. Herron (2nd season)
- Captain: B. B. Tips
- Home stadium: Wilson Field

1927 Southern Conference football standings
| | Conf. | | | | | Overall |
| Team | W | | L | | T | W | | L | | T |
|---|---|---|---|---|---|---|---|---|---|---|
| Georgia Tech + | 7 | – | 0 | – | 1 | 8 | – | 1 | – | 1 |
| Tennessee + | 5 | – | 0 | – | 1 | 8 | – | 0 | – | 1 |
| NC State + | 4 | – | 0 | – | 0 | 9 | – | 1 | – | 0 |
| Vanderbilt | 5 | – | 0 | – | 2 | 8 | – | 1 | – | 2 |
| No. 8 Georgia | 6 | – | 1 | – | 0 | 9 | – | 1 | – | 0 |
| Florida | 5 | – | 2 | – | 0 | 7 | – | 3 | – | 0 |
| Ole Miss | 3 | – | 2 | – | 0 | 5 | – | 3 | – | 1 |
| Virginia | 4 | – | 4 | – | 0 | 5 | – | 4 | – | 0 |
| Clemson | 2 | – | 2 | – | 0 | 5 | – | 3 | – | 1 |
| Alabama | 3 | – | 4 | – | 1 | 5 | – | 4 | – | 1 |
| LSU | 2 | – | 3 | – | 1 | 4 | – | 4 | – | 1 |
| Mississippi A&M | 2 | – | 3 | – | 0 | 5 | – | 3 | – | 0 |
| Washington and Lee | 2 | – | 3 | – | 0 | 4 | – | 4 | – | 1 |
| VPI | 2 | – | 3 | – | 0 | 5 | – | 4 | – | 0 |
| Maryland | 3 | – | 5 | – | 0 | 4 | – | 7 | – | 0 |
| South Carolina | 2 | – | 4 | – | 0 | 4 | – | 5 | – | 0 |
| VMI | 2 | – | 4 | – | 0 | 6 | – | 4 | – | 0 |
| Tulane | 2 | – | 5 | – | 1 | 2 | – | 5 | – | 1 |
| North Carolina | 2 | – | 5 | – | 0 | 4 | – | 6 | – | 0 |
| Sewanee | 1 | – | 4 | – | 0 | 2 | – | 6 | – | 0 |
| Kentucky | 1 | – | 5 | – | 0 | 3 | – | 6 | – | 1 |
| Auburn | 0 | – | 6 | – | 1 | 0 | – | 7 | – | 2 |
+ – Conference co-champions; Rankings from Dickinson System

The 1927 Washington and Lee Generals football team was an American football team that represented Washington and Lee University as a member of the Southern Conference (SoCon) during the 1927 college football season. In their second season under head coach James P. Herron, Washington and Lee compiled a 4–4–1 record.

== Schedule ==
| Date | Opponent | Site | Result | Source |
|---|---|---|---|---|
| September 24 | Lynchburg* | Wilson Field; Lexington, VA | W 27–2 | |
| October 1 | vs. West Virginia* | Laidley Field; Charleston, WV | T 6–6 | |
| October 8 | Duke* | Wilson Field; Lexington, VA | W 12–7 | |
| October 15 | at Princeton* | Palmer Stadium; Princeton, NJ | L 0–13 | |
| October 22 | at Kentucky | Stoll Field; Lexington, KY | W 25–0 | |
| October 29 | at Maryland | Byrd Stadium; College Park, MD | W 13–6 | |
| November 5 | Virginia | Wilson Field; Lexington, VA | L 7–13 | |
| November 12 | at VPI | Miles Stadium; Blacksburg, VA | L 0–21 | |
| November 24 | at Florida | Durkee Field; Jacksonville, FL | L 7–20 | |
*Non-conference game
