= Mike Stramiello =

American football player (1907–2000)

Profile
- Position: End

Personal information
- Born: February 2, 1907; New York, New York, U.S.
- Died: February 6, 2000 (aged 93); Naples, Florida, U.S.
- Listed height: 6 ft 1 in (1.85 m)
- Listed weight: 198 lb (90 kg)

Career information
- High school: Poly Prep (NY)
- College: Colgate

Career history
- Brooklyn Dodgers (1930-1932); Staten Island Stapletons (1932–1933); Brooklyn Dodgers (1934)

Michael Stramiello Jr. (February 2, 1907 – February 6, 2000) was an American football player, coach, and team owner. He played five seasons in the National Football League (NFL) from 1930 to 1934. He was also the coach and an owner of the Newark Tornadoes in 1937 and 1938.

== Early life ==
Stramiello was born in 1907 in New York City. He played high school football at Poly Prep in Brooklyn and was named to the all-scholastic team. He next played college football at Colgate from 1926 to 1929. While playing for Colgate, he developed a reputation for durability, playing every game without incurring injury. Stramiello was also the heavyweight boxing champion at Colgate and "one of its outstanding students."

== Professional football ==
He played professional football in the National Football League (NFL) as an end for the Brooklyn Dodgers (1930-1932, 1934) and Staten Island Stapletons (1932-1933). He appeared in 35 NFL games, 27 as a starter. He scored two touchdowns and kicked six extra points. His first NFL touchdown was a 30-yard interception return in October 1931. His final NFL touchdown was scored on an offensive pass reception against the Green Bay Packers in November 1933. Stramiello also attended law school while playing for Brooklyn.

== Coaching and later years ==
He was the head coach of the Newark Tornadoes of the American Football Association in 1937 and 1938. He led the Tornadoes to a 1–10 record in 1937 and 5–7 in 1938. He was also a fifty percent owner of the team.

Stramiello died in 2000 in Naples, Florida, at age 93.
