= 1927 NC State Wolfpack football team =

American college football season

1927 NC State Wolfpack football

SoCon co-champion
- Conference: Southern Conference
- Record: 9–1 (4–0 SoCon)
- Head coach: Gus Tebell (3rd season)
- Captain: Nick Nicholson
- Home stadium: Riddick Stadium

Uniform
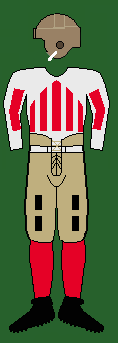

1927 Southern Conference football standings
| | Conf. | | | | | Overall |
| Team | W | | L | | T | W | | L | | T |
|---|---|---|---|---|---|---|---|---|---|---|
| Georgia Tech + | 7 | – | 0 | – | 1 | 8 | – | 1 | – | 1 |
| Tennessee + | 5 | – | 0 | – | 1 | 8 | – | 0 | – | 1 |
| NC State + | 4 | – | 0 | – | 0 | 9 | – | 1 | – | 0 |
| Vanderbilt | 5 | – | 0 | – | 2 | 8 | – | 1 | – | 2 |
| No. 8 Georgia | 6 | – | 1 | – | 0 | 9 | – | 1 | – | 0 |
| Florida | 5 | – | 2 | – | 0 | 7 | – | 3 | – | 0 |
| Ole Miss | 3 | – | 2 | – | 0 | 5 | – | 3 | – | 1 |
| Virginia | 4 | – | 4 | – | 0 | 5 | – | 4 | – | 0 |
| Clemson | 2 | – | 2 | – | 0 | 5 | – | 3 | – | 1 |
| Alabama | 3 | – | 4 | – | 1 | 5 | – | 4 | – | 1 |
| LSU | 2 | – | 3 | – | 1 | 4 | – | 4 | – | 1 |
| Mississippi A&M | 2 | – | 3 | – | 0 | 5 | – | 3 | – | 0 |
| Washington and Lee | 2 | – | 3 | – | 0 | 4 | – | 4 | – | 1 |
| VPI | 2 | – | 3 | – | 0 | 5 | – | 4 | – | 0 |
| Maryland | 3 | – | 5 | – | 0 | 4 | – | 7 | – | 0 |
| South Carolina | 2 | – | 4 | – | 0 | 4 | – | 5 | – | 0 |
| VMI | 2 | – | 4 | – | 0 | 6 | – | 4 | – | 0 |
| Tulane | 2 | – | 5 | – | 1 | 2 | – | 5 | – | 1 |
| North Carolina | 2 | – | 5 | – | 0 | 4 | – | 6 | – | 0 |
| Sewanee | 1 | – | 4 | – | 0 | 2 | – | 6 | – | 0 |
| Kentucky | 1 | – | 5 | – | 0 | 3 | – | 6 | – | 1 |
| Auburn | 0 | – | 6 | – | 1 | 0 | – | 7 | – | 2 |
+ – Conference co-champions; Rankings from Dickinson System

The 1927 NC State Wolfpack football team represented North Carolina State University during the 1927 Southern Conference football season. They played their home games in Raleigh, North Carolina. The Wolfpack were coached by Gus Tebell in his third year as head coach, compiling a record of 9–1 and outscoring opponents 216 to 69.

NC State tied with Georgia Tech and Tennessee for the Southern Conference title, including the only unbeaten and untied conference record. Also in the conference were Bill Spears-led Vanderbilt (giving both Tech and Tennessee their ties) and Georgia's "dream and wonder team." NC State was led by All-Southern running back and College Football Hall of Fame inductee Jack McDowall.

== Schedule ==
| Date | Opponent | Site | Result | Attendance | Source |
|---|---|---|---|---|---|
| September 23 | Elon* | Riddick Stadium; Raleigh, NC | W 39–0 | | |
| September 30 | at Furman* | Manly Field; Greenville, SC | L 0–20 | 3,000 | |
| October 8 | Clemson | Riddick Stadium; Raleigh, NC (rivalry) | W 18–6 | | |
| October 13 | Wake Forest* | Riddick Stadium; Raleigh, NC (rivalry) | W 30–7 | | |
| October 22 | vs. Florida | Plant Field; Tampa, FL | W 12–6 | 7,000 | |
| October 29 | North Carolina | Riddick Stadium; Raleigh, NC (rivalry) | W 19–6 | 18,000 | |
| November 5 | vs. Davidson* | World War Memorial Stadium; Greensboro, NC | W 25–6 | | |
| November 11 | at Duke* | Hanes Field; Durham, NC (rivalry) | W 20–18 | | |
| November 24 | at South Carolina | Melton Field; Columbia, SC | W 34–0 | 4,500 | |
| December 3 | Michigan State* | Riddick Stadium; Raleigh, NC | W 19–0 | | |
*Non-conference game

== Game summaries ==
=== Week 1: Elon ===
The Wolf Pack opened the season with a 39–0 victory over Elon.

=== Week 2: at Furman ===
In the second week, NC State suffered the season's only loss on the road to the Furman Purple Hurricane 0–20. Furman quarterback Whitey Rawl scored three touchdowns.

=== Week 3: Clemson ===
Week 3: Clemson at North Carolina State

| Team | 1 | 2 | 3 | 4 | Total |
|---|---|---|---|---|---|
| Clemson | 0 | 0 | 6 | 0 | 6 |
| • NC State | 6 | 6 | 0 | 6 | 18 |

- Date: October 16, 1927
- Location: Riddick Stadium
  Raleigh, NC
- Referee: Alexander (W&J)

The Wolfpack beat the Clemson Tigers 18–6. Though Jack McDowall did not score any of the touchdowns his play resulted in all the scores, including passes to Childress and Goodwin.

The starting lineup for the Wolfpack against Florida: Goodwin (left end), Evans (left tackle), Vaughan (left guard), Metts (center), Nicholson (right guard), Lepo (right tackle), Childress (right end), Adams (quarterback), Outen (left halfback), McDowall (right halfback), Warren (fullback). Herman Stegeman was umpire.

=== Week 4: Wake Forest ===
The Wake Forest Demon Deacons were defeated 30–7. McDowall threw several passes, and returned a punt 60 yards for a touchdown.

=== Week 5: at Florida ===
Week 5: North Carolina State at Florida

| Team | 1 | 2 | 3 | 4 | Total |
|---|---|---|---|---|---|
| • NC State | 0 | 0 | 0 | 12 | 12 |
| Florida | 0 | 0 | 0 | 6 | 6 |

- Date: October 23, 1927
- Location: Plant Field
  Tampa, FL
- Referee: Springer (Penn)

In the fifth week of play, the Wolfpack faced captain Jack McDowall's native Florida Gators in Tampa, winning 12–6. Neither team scored until the final period. Since McDowall had been turned down by the University of Florida, legend has it just afterwards he mailed coach Tom Sebring the game ball.

A drive brought the Wolfpack to the 3-yard line, the feature play of which was a 30-yard pass from McDowall to Childress. A pass from McDowall to Frank Goodwin got the score. The Gators then began passing desperately in an attempt to win. A pass bounced off the hands of a Florida back and into McDowall's, who returned the ball 75 yards for the deciding score. On the ensuing kickoff, Gator back Tommy Owens ran it back for an 88-yard touchdown.

The starting lineup for the Wolfpack against Florida: Goodwin (left end), Lepo (left tackle), Nicholson (left guard), Metts (center), Vaughan (right guard), Evans (right tackle), Childress (right end), Adams (quarterback), McDowall (left halfback), Cram (right halfback), Warren (fullback).

=== Week 6: North Carolina ===
Week 6: North Carolina at North Carolina State

| Team | 1 | 2 | 3 | 4 | Total |
|---|---|---|---|---|---|
| N. Carolina | 0 | 0 | 0 | 6 | 6 |
| • NC State | 7 | 6 | 0 | 6 | 19 |

- Date: October 30
- Location: Riddick Stadium
  Raleigh, NC
- Game attendance: 18,000
- Referee: Rip Major

NC State defeated the in-state rival North Carolina Tar Heels 19 to 6.

The first score came after a 30-yard pass from Jack McDowall to Hunsucker set up a 9-yard end run from McDowall for touchdown. The third touchdown was a 4-yard touchdown pass the width of the field from McDowall to Hunsucker.

The starting lineup for the Wolfpack against North Carolina: Goodwin (left end), Evans (left tackle), Vaughan (left guard), Metts (center), Nicholson (right guard), Lepo (right tackle), Childress (right end), Adams (quarterback), McDowall (left halfback), Hunsucker (right halfback), Lipscomb (fullback).

=== Week 7: vs. Davidson ===
Week 7: North Carolina State at Davidson

| Team | 1 | 2 | 3 | 4 | Total |
|---|---|---|---|---|---|
| • NC State | 6 | 6 | 0 | 13 | 25 |
| Davidson | 0 | 0 | 6 | 0 | 6 |

- Date: November 5, 1927
- Location: Greensboro, NC
- Referee: Gooch (Virginia)

The Wolf Pack beat the Davidson Wildcats 25–6. McDowall had a run of 65 yards.

The starting lineup was: Goodwin (left end), Evans (left tackle), Vaughan (left guard), Metts (center), C. Nicholson (right guard), Lepo (right tackle), Childress (right end), Adams (quarterback), Hunsucker (left halfback), McDowall (right halfback), Warren (fullback).

=== Week 8: at Duke ===
NC State defeated Duke in Durham 20–18 "in one of the most thrilling football battles ever staged in N. C." After the Blue Devils rushed out to an early 12–0 lead, McDowall's two drop kicks proved the difference.

=== Week 9: at South Carolina ===
The South Carolina Gamecocks were shutout 34–0.

=== Week 10: Michigan State ===
Week 10: Michigan State at North Carolina State

| Team | 1 | 2 | 3 | 4 | Total |
|---|---|---|---|---|---|
| Mich. State | 0 | 0 | 0 | 0 | 0 |
| • NC State | 6 | 0 | 7 | 6 | 19 |

- Date: December 3
- Location: Riddick Stadium
  Raleigh, NC
- Game weather: Rain

In the season's final game, NC State hosted a northern opponent, the Michigan Aggies. On a muddy, waterlogged field, the Wolfpack won 19 to 0.

Captain Jack McDowall was cited as the best player in his final game, despite his only scoring play being a pass for an extra point.

== Awards and honors ==
- All-Southern: Jack McDowall

== Players ==
=== Line ===
| Player | Position | Games started | Hometown | Prep school | Height | Weight | Age |
|---|---|---|---|---|---|---|---|
| Bob Evans | tackle | | | | | | |
| Childress | end | | | | | | |
| John Ford | guard | | | | | | |
| Floyd | tackle | | | | | | |
| Frank Goodwin | end | | | | | | |
| Joseph Harden | center | | | | | | |
| Jordan | end | | | | | | |
| John Lepo | tackle | | | | | | |
| Metts | center | | | | | | |
| Nick Nicholson | guard | | | | | | |
| Fred Vaughan | guard | | Roanoke Rapids, North Carolina | | | 196 | |

=== Backfield ===
| Player | Position | Games started | Hometown | Prep school | Height | Weight | Age |
|---|---|---|---|---|---|---|---|
| Sparky Adams | quarterback | | | | | | |
| Fred Crum | halfback | | | | | | |
| George Hunsucker | halfback | | | | | | |
| Robert Jeffries | fullback | | | | | | |
| Jack McDowall | halfback | | Gainesville, Florida | Rockingham High | 6'1" | 175 | 22 |
| Bill "Chink" Outen | halfback | | | | | | |
| Clarence Ridenhour | quarterback | | | | | | |
| Bob Warren | fullback | | | | | | |

== Coaching staff ==
- Head coach: Gus Tebell
- Assistants: Butch Slaughter, Doc Sermon
