= Hoot Haines =

American football player (1907–1968)

Personal information
- Born: February 25, 1907; Philadelphia, Pennsylvania, U.S.
- Died: August 17, 1965 (aged 58); Unknown (listed in ESPN as "Brighton, New York", but unconfirmed)
- Listed height: 6 ft 0 in (1.83 m)
- Listed weight: 205 lb (93 kg)

Career information
- High school: Germantown (PA)
- College: Colgate

Career history
- Brooklyn Dodgers (1930–1931); Staten Island Stapletons (1931)

Career statistics
- Games played: 17
- Stats at Pro Football Reference

Harry Jepson "Hoot" Haines (February 25, 1907 – August 17, 1968) was an American professional football player who spent two seasons in the National Football League with the Brooklyn Dodgers from 1930 to 1931, and the Staten Island Stapletons in 1931. Hains played in a total of 17 career games, and made 10 starts.
