= Jack McDowall =

American footballer and coach (1905–1969)

Biographical details
- Born: June 26, 1905; Micanopy, Florida, U.S.
- Died: May 25, 1969 (aged 63); Winter Park, Florida, U.S.

Playing career

Football
- 1925–1927: NC State
- Positions: Halfback, quarterback, end

Coaching career (HC unless noted)

Football
- 1929–1948: Rollins

Administrative career (AD unless noted)
- 1929–1957: Rollins

Accomplishments and honors

Championships
- 1 SIAA (1940)

Awards
- All-Southern (1927); SoCon high jump record 1925-1931; NC State Athletic Hall of Fame; 2× Norris Cup recipient (1925, 1926)
- College Football Hall of Fame; Inducted in 1975 (profile)

John Witherspoon McDowall (June 26, 1905 – May 25, 1969), known as "Spindle Legs", was an American football, baseball, basketball player and track athlete at North Carolina State University. McDowall was recognized as an All-Southern football player in 1927. He was elected to the College Football Hall of Fame in 1975, becoming the first player from NC State to be inducted. In 2014, he was inducted into the NC State Athletic Hall of Fame.

== Early years ==
McDowall was born on June 26, 1905, in Micanopy, Florida to J. W. McDowall and M. D. Younglove. Jack played high school ball in Gainesville, Florida under Rex Farrior. In 1922 he led the Gainesville High team to an undefeated season and the Florida High School State Championship. After having starred at Gainesville, he was deemed too small to ever get a scholarship to the University of Florida even though he was some 6 feet 1 inch tall. At a Gainesville pool hall J. B. "Shorty" Lawrence, a Floridian coaching in North Carolina, offered him the chance to play at Rockingham for $25 a week. He led the Rockingham team to a 6–1–1 season, losing only to New Bern in the second round of the state championship playoffs. This led to his chance to play for NC State.

=== NC State ===
McDowall won 11 letters at NC State. He was named the top athlete in the first half-century of NC State athletics. McDowall is the only man to twice win the Norris Cup, and once held the North Carolina state record in the high jump.

==== Football ====
He is best known as North Carolina State's first All-Southern running back, and its first inductee to the College Football Hall of Fame.

===== 1925 =====
He once ran for an 80-yard touchdown against Richmond.

===== 1927 =====
He led the Wolfpack to a 9–1 mark and a Southern Conference championship in 1927 under coach Gus Tebell. McDowall threw for 14 of the Wolfpack's 31 touchdowns. In the 12–6 win in Tampa over his hometown Florida Gators, he ran 75 yards for a touchdown after intercepting the ball off a Gator's hands. The season closed with a convincing defeat of Michigan State. He was selected to play on an All-Southern team which beat an All-Pacific Coast team on Christmas Day in Los Angeles. Georgia Tech coach Bill Alexander said of McDowall, "I have talked with a number of persons who know football well and that have seen McDowall play. They all say he is a wonder at running and passing. We expect much of him when we go to the Pacific Coast for the Christmas charity game."

==== Basketball ====
===== 1927–28 =====
He was also captain of the basketball team in 1928.

== Coaching career ==
He later coached at Asheville High School, and was athletic director of Rollins College in his native state of Florida for 29 years.

== Politics ==
In 1952, he successfully ran as a Democrat for Orange County commissioner on a platform consisting of pro-business administration, better roads, country beautification, the Sports Fishermen's Program, and conservation. Re-elected in 1956, McDowall held the position until 1960.

== Personal ==
McDowall completed a master's degree in psychology at Duke University.

One description of Jack goes as follows: "He wears spectacles, is wiry of build and has been described as looking more like a minister than a football player."
