= Stumpy Thomason =

American football player (1906–1989)

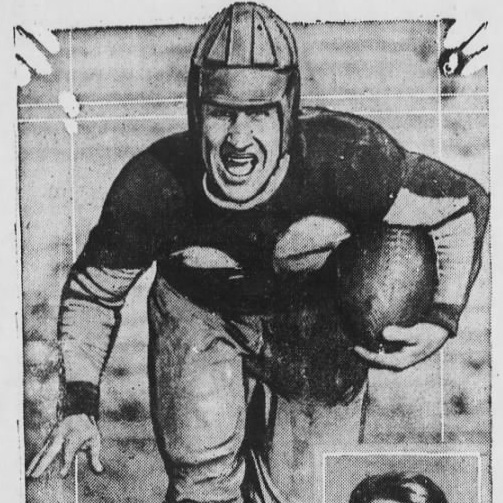
- Thomason at Tech c. 1927

Profile
- Position: Quarterback

Personal information
- Born: February 24, 1906; Atlanta, Georgia, U.S.
- Died: April 30, 1989 (aged 83)
- Listed height: 5 ft 7 in (1.70 m)
- Listed weight: 189 lb (86 kg)

Career information
- College: Georgia Tech

Career history
- 1930–1935: Brooklyn Dodgers
- 1935–1936: Philadelphia Eagles

Awards and highlights
- Championships: National (1928); 2× Southern (1927, 1928); Honors: 2× All-Southern (1927, 1929); Tech All-Era Team (William Alexander Era)

John Griffin "Stumpy" Thomason (February 24, 1906 – April 30, 1989) was an American professional football player who was a running back for seven seasons for the Brooklyn Dodgers and Philadelphia Eagles. He played college football for the 1928 national champion Georgia Tech Yellow Jackets football team, in the backfield with Warner Mizell. Thomason was All-Southern in 1927.
