= Warner Mizell =

American football player (1907–1971)

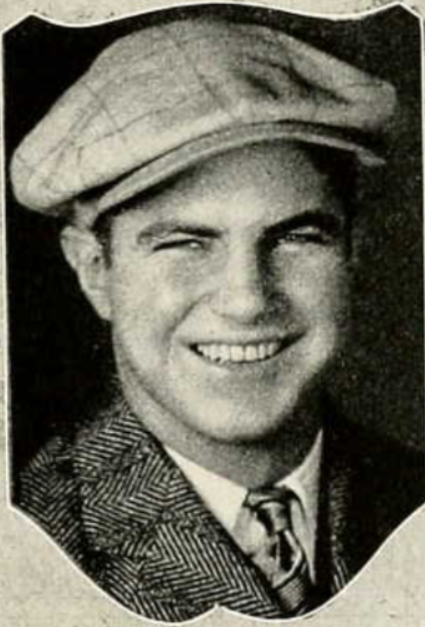

No. 67
- Position: Halfback

Personal information
- Born: March 22, 1908; Atlanta, Georgia, U.S.
- Died: October 2, 1962 (aged 54); Montclair, New Jersey, U.S.
- Listed height: 6 ft 0 in (1.83 m)
- Listed weight: 207 lb (94 kg)

Career information
- High school: Miami Senior
- College: Georgia Institute of Technology

Career history
- Georgia Tech Yellow Jackets (1927–28); Frankford Yellow Jackets (1931); Brooklyn Dodgers (NFL) (1931)

Awards and highlights
- Championships: National (1928); 2 Southern (1927, 1928); Honors: First-team All-American (1928); 2x All-Southern (1927, 1928)
- Stats at Pro Football Reference

Luke Warner Mizell (March 22, 1908 – October 2, 1962) was an American football player. He played at the halfback position for the Georgia Tech Yellow Jackets football team and was selected by the Associated Press, United Press, and Central Press as a second-team player on their 1928 College Football All-America Teams. He also played in the National Football League (NFL) for the Frankford Yellow Jackets and Brooklyn Dodgers.
