= 1927 Western Maryland Green Terror football team =

American college football season

1927 Western Maryland Green Terror football
- Conference: Independent
- Record: 6–2
- Head coach: Dick Harlow (2nd season)
- Captain: Orville W. "Greasy" Neal

1927 Southern college football independents records
	Conf.			Overall
Team	W	L	T	W		L		T
Georgetown		–		8	–	1	–	0
Spring Hill		–		6	–	1	–	0
Wesley		–		6	–	1	–	0
Georgia Normal		–		6	–	1	–	1
George Washington		–		7	–	2	–	0
Texas A&I		–		4	–	1	–	0
Middle Tennessee State Teachers		–		6	–	2	–	0
Loyola (LA)		–		6	–	2	–	2
Navy		–		6	–	3	–	0
Catholic University		–		5	–	3	–	0
West Tennessee State Teachers		–		5	–	3	–	1
Texas Tech		–		5	–	4	–	0
Davidson		–		4	–	4	–	1
Delaware State		–		1	–	1	–	0
Howard		–		3	–	3	–	2
Southwestern (TN)		–		5	–	5	–	1
Texas Mines		–		2	–	2	–	2
Mississippi State Teachers		–		3	–	4	–	1
Duke		–		4	–	5	–	0
Miami (FL)		–		3	–	6	–	1
Delaware		–		2	–	5	–	1
East Tennessee State Teachers		–		2	–	5	–	0
Oglethorpe		–		2	–	6	–	0
Wake Forest		–		2	–	6	–	2

The 1927 Western Maryland Green Terror football team was an American football team that represented Western Maryland College (now known as McDaniel College) as an independent during the 1927 college football season. In its second season under head coach Dick Harlow, the team compiled a 6–2 record and shut out six of its eight opponents. Orville W. "Greasy" Neal was team captain.

Harlow served nine years as Western Maryland's head football coach. During those years, the school's football team compiled a 60–13–7 record. Harlow was later inducted into the College Football Hall of Fame.

The team played its homecoming game on the school's campus in Westminster, Maryland. No other games were played on campus.

== Schedule ==
Date	Opponent	Site	Result	Attendance	Source
October 1	at Washington & Jefferson	Washington, PA	L 6–15		
October 8	at Schuylkill	Schuylkill Stadium; Reading, PA	W 13–0		
October 15	at Dickinson	Carlisle, PA	W 45–0		
October 22	Albright^{†}	Westminster, MD	W 33–0		
October 28	at Gettysburg	Memorial Field; Gettysburg, PA	W 41–0		
November 5	vs. Loyola (MD)	Baltimore Stadium; Baltimore, MD	W 26–0		
November 11	vs. All-Army	Baltimore Stadium; Baltimore, MD (Armistice Day)	W 48–0	23,000	
November 24	at Muhlenberg	Allentown, PA	L 2–6		
^{†}Homecoming
