= List of Furman Paladins head football coaches =

The Furman Paladins college football team represents the Furman University in the Southern Conference. The Paladins compete as part of the NCAA Division I Football Championship Subdivision. The program has had 23 head coaches since it began play during the 1889 season. Since December 2016, Clay Hendrix has served as head coach at Furman.

Six coaches have led Furman in postseason appearances: Dick Sheridan, Jimmy Satterfield, Bobby Johnson, Bobby Lamb, Bruce Fowler, and Hendrix. Eight of those coaches also won conference championships: Billy Laval captured three and Dizzy McLeod captured one as a member of the Southern Intercollegiate Athletic Association; and Sheridan captured six, Satterfield three, Johnson two, and Lamb and Fowler one each as a member of the Southern Conference.

Bob King is the leader in overall seasons coached with his 15 years as head coach. Laval has the most all time wins with 80 and H. C. Granger has the highest winning percentage at 1.000. William Beattie has the lowest winning percentage at 0.000. Of the 23 different head coaches who have led the Paladins, Dick Sheridan has been inducted into the College Football Hall of Fame.

== Key ==
Key to symbols in coaches list
General		Overall		Conference		Postseason (Note: Although the first Rose Bowl Game was played in 1902, it has been continuously played since the 1916 game, and is recognized as the oldest bowl game by the NCAA. "—" indicates any season prior to 1916 when postseason games were not played.)	
No.	Order of coaches (Note: A running total of the number of head coaches, with coaches who served separate tenures being counted only once. Interim head coaches are represented with "Int" and are not counted in the running total. "—" indicates the team played but either without a coach or no coach is on record. "X" indicates an interim year without play.)	GC	Games coached	CW	Conference wins	PW	Postseason wins
DC	Division championships	OW	Overall wins	CL	Conference losses	PL	Postseason losses
CC	Conference championships	OL	Overall losses	CT	Conference ties	PT	Postseason ties
NC	National championships	OT	Overall ties (Note: Overtime rules in college football were introduced in 1996, making ties impossible in the period since.)	C%	Conference winning percentage		
†	Elected to the College Football Hall of Fame	O%	Overall winning percentage (Note: When computing the win–loss percentage, a tie counts as half a win and half a loss.)				

== Coaches ==
List of head football coaches showing season(s) coached, overall records, conference records, postseason records, championships and selected awards (Note: Statistics correct as of the end of the 2025 NCAA Division I FCS football season.)
No.	Name	Season(s) (Note: Furman did not field a team for the 1894, 1897–1899, 1903–1912, and 1943–1945 seasons.)	GC	OW	OL	OT	O%	CW	CL	CT	C%	PW	PL	PT	CC	NC	Awards
1	William Beattie	1889	2	0	2	0	.000	—	—	—	—	—	—	—	—	—	—
2	H. C. Granger	1890	2	2	0	0	1.000	—	—	—	—	—	—	—	—	—	—
3	H. P. Young	1891–1993; 1895	6	2	4	0	0.333	—	—	—	—	—	—	—	—	—	—
4	Frank Sims	1896	5	2	3	0	0.400	—	—	—	—	—	—	—	—	—	—
5	Frank Spencer	1900	3	0	2	1	0.167	—	—	—	—	—	—	—	—	—	—
6	Charles Roller	1901–1902	15	5	5	5	0.500	1	2	1	0.375	—	—	—	0	—	—
7	Cuppy Farmer	1913	9	6	3	0	0.667	—	—	—	—	—	—	—	—	—	—
8	W. B. Bible	1914–1916	14	6	8	0	0.429	0	1	0	.000	—	—	—	0	—	—
9	Billy Laval	1915–1926	119	80	35	4	0.689	32	18	3	0.632	—	—	—	3	—	—
10	T. B. Amis	1928–1931	38	21	13	4	0.605	7	2	1	0.750	—	—	—	0	—	—
11	Dizzy McLeod	1932–1942	100	56	37	7	0.595	34	19	6	0.627	—	—	—	1	—	—
12	Bob Smith	1946–1947	19	4	15	0	0.211	2	8	0	0.200	—	—	—	0	—	—
13	Red Smith	1948–1949	18	5	12	1	0.306	5	7	0	0.417	—	—	—	0	—	—
14	Bill Young	1950–1954	50	23	24	3	0.490	9	10	2	0.476	—	—	—	0	—	—
15	Homer Hobbs	1955–1957	30	6	24	0	0.200	4	4	0	0.500	—	—	—	0	—	—
16	Bob King	1958–1972	152	60	88	4	0.408	25	45	0	0.357	—	—	—	0	—	—
17	Art Baker	1973–1977	55	27	24	4	0.527	12	15	2	0.448	—	—	—	0	—	—
18	Dick Sheridan^{†}	1978–1985	94	69	23	2	0.745	41	10	1	0.798	3	3	0	6	—	AFCA Division I-AA COY (1985)
19	Jimmy Satterfield	1986–1993	98	66	29	3	0.689	39	17	1	0.693	7	3	0	3	1; 1988	AFCA Division I-AA COY (1988)
20	Bobby Johnson	1994–2001	96	60	36	0	0.625	41	23	0	0.641	4	4	0	2	—	—
21	Bobby Lamb	2002–2010	107	67	40	—	0.626	43	25	—	0.632	3	4	—	1	—	—
22	Bruce Fowler	2011–2016	70	27	43	—	0.386	20	26	—	0.435	1	1	—	1	—	—
23	Clay Hendrix	2017–present	103	60	43	—	0.583	45	25	—	0.643	3	4	—	2	—	—
