= List of Furman Paladins men's basketball seasons =

This is a list of the seasons completed by the Furman Paladins men's basketball team.

== Season-by-season results ==
Statistics overview
Season	Coach	Overall	Conference	Standing	Postseason
No coach (1908–1912)
1908–09	No coach	3–1			
1909–10	No coach	2–6			
1910–11	No coach	2–1			
1911–12	No coach	0–2			
No coach:		7–10 (.412)			
William Craig (Independent) (1912–1913)
1912–13	William Craig	1–4			
William Craig:		1–4 (.200)			
H. M. Perry (Independent) (1913–1914)
1913–14	H. M. Perry	5–4			
H. M. Perry:		5–4 (.556)			
W. B. Bible (Independent) (1914–1915)
1914–15	W. B. Bible	0–3			
W. B. Bible:		0–3 (.000)			
Charles Dushan (Independent) (1915–1916)
1915–16	Charles Dushan	2–6			
Charles Dushan:		2–6 (.250)			
No team (1916–1919)
Billy Laval (Independent) (1919–1927)
1919–20	Billy Laval	2–12			
1920–21	Billy Laval	1–12			
1921–22	Billy Laval	8–7			
1922–23	Billy Laval	11–7			
1923–24	Billy Laval	7–7			
1924–25	Billy Laval	9–7			
1925–26	Billy Laval	11–9			
1926–27	Billy Laval	16–4			
Billy Laval:		65–65 (.500)			
Rock Norman (Independent) (1927–1928)
1927–28	Rock Norman	16–3			
Rock Norman:		16–3 (.842)			
Dizzy McLeod (Independent) (1928–1933)
1928–29	Dizzy McLeod	12–6			
1929–30	Dizzy McLeod	16–1			
1930–31	Dizzy McLeod	15–2			
1931–32	Dizzy McLeod	15–1			
1932–33	Dizzy McLeod	11–8			
Dizzy McLeod:		69–18 (.793)			
Flucie Stewart (Independent) (1933–1935)
1933–34	Flucie Stewart	3–12			
1934–35	Flucie Stewart	9–8			
Flucie Stewart:		12–20 (.375)			
Bob Smith (Independent) (1935–1936)
1935–36	Bob Smith	10–6			
Bob Smith (Southern Conference) (1936–1942)
1936–37	Bob Smith	8–7	3–4	9th	
1937–38	Bob Smith	6–13	2–7	12th	
1938–39	Bob Smith	6–16	0–11	15th	
1939–40	Bob Smith	11–11	5–7	12th	
1940–41	Bob Smith	4–13	1–10	14th	
1941–42	Bob Smith	10–9	7–8	9th	
Bob Smith:		55–75 (.423)	18–47 (.277)		
No team (World War II) (1942–1944)
Selwyn Edwards (Southern Conference) (1944–1945)
1944–45	Selwyn Edwards	2–15	0–8	14th	
Selwyn Edwards:		2–15 (.118)	0–8 (.000)		
Lyles Alley (Southern Conference) (1945–1949)
1945–46	Lyles Alley	15–4	7–4	3rd	
1946–47	Lyles Alley	9–10	5–7	12th	
1947–48	Lyles Alley	11–15	3–10	14th	
1948–49	Lyles Alley	8–14	4–11	15th	
Melvin Bell (Southern Conference) (1949–1950)
1949–50	Melvin Bell	9–12	4–8	11th	
Melvin Bell:		9–12 (.429)	4–8 (.333)		
Lyles Alley (Southern Conference) (1950–1966)
1950–51	Lyles Alley	3–20	1–13	17th	
1951–52	Lyles Alley	18–6	9–5	T–6th	
1952–53	Lyles Alley	21–6	10–3	5th	
1953–54	Lyles Alley	20–9	6–1	2nd	
1954–55	Lyles Alley	17–10	6–4	5th	
1955–56	Lyles Alley	12–16	7–7	6th	
1956–57	Lyles Alley	10–17	7–5	4th	
1957–58	Lyles Alley	10–16	4–8	T–7th	
1958–59	Lyles Alley	14–12	5–7	T–6th	
1959–60	Lyles Alley	9–16	6–7	T–6th	
1960–61	Lyles Alley	15–11	6–7	5th	
1961–62	Lyles Alley	15–12	8–5	3rd	
1962–63	Lyles Alley	14–14	9–6	4th	
1963–64	Lyles Alley	11–15	7–8	5th	
1964–65	Lyles Alley	7–18	3–11	9th	
1965–66	Lyles Alley	9–17	4–8	6th	
Lyles Alley:		248–258 (.490)	117–137 (.461)		
Frank Selvy (Southern Conference) (1966–1970)
1966–67	Frank Selvy	9–15	4–6	7th	
1967–68	Frank Selvy	13–14	6–6	5th	
1968–69	Frank Selvy	9–17	5–6	5th	
1969–70	Frank Selvy	13–13	5–6	4th	
Frank Selvy:		44–59 (.427)	20–24 (.455)		
Joe Williams (Southern Conference) (1970–1978)
1970–71	Joe Williams	15–12	5–5	5th	NCAA University Division First Round
1971–72	Joe Williams	17–11	8–3	2nd	
1972–73	Joe Williams	20–9	11–2	2nd	NCAA University Division First Round
1973–74	Joe Williams	22–9	11–1	1st	NCAA Division I Regional Fourth Place
1974–75	Joe Williams	22–7	12–0	1st	NCAA Division I First Round
1975–76	Joe Williams	9–18	5–7	7th	
1976–77	Joe Williams	18–10	8–2	T–1st	
1977–78	Joe Williams	19–11	7–5	T–4th	NCAA Division I First Round
Joe Williams:		142–87 (.620)	67–25 (.728)		
Eddie Holbrook (Southern Conference) (1978–1982)
1978–79	Eddie Holbrook	20–9	9–3	2nd	
1979–80	Eddie Holbrook	23–7	14–1	1st	NCAA Division I First Round
1980–81	Eddie Holbrook	11–16	8–8	T–6th	
1981–82	Eddie Holbrook	11–16	7–9	T–6th	
Eddie Holbrook:		65–48 (.575)	38–21 (.644)		
Jene Davis (Southern Conference) (1982–1985)
1982–83	Jene Davis	9–20	4–12	7th	
1983–84	Jene Davis	12–17	7–9	6th	
1984–85	Jene Davis	7–21	4–12	8th	
Jene Davis:		28–58 (.326)	15–33 (.313)		
Butch Estes (Southern Conference) (1985–1994)
1985–86	Butch Estes	10–17	5–11	T–7th	
1986–87	Butch Estes	17–12	10–6	4th	
1987–88	Butch Estes	18–10	11–5	2nd	
1988–89	Butch Estes	17–12	9–5	2nd	
1989–90	Butch Estes	15–16	5–9	7th	
1990–91	Butch Estes	20–9	11–3	1st	NIT first round
1991–92	Butch Estes	17–11	9–5	4th	
1992–93	Butch Estes	11–17	8–10	T–7th	
1993–94	Butch Estes	10–18	6–12	T–8th	
Butch Estes:		135–122 (.525)	74–66 (.529)		
Joe Cantafio (Southern Conference) (1994–1997)
1994–95	Joe Cantafio	10–17	6–8	T–3rd (South)	
1995–96	Joe Cantafio	10–17	6–8	3rd (South)	
1996–97	Joe Cantafio	10–17	4–10	5th (South)	
Joe Cantafio:		30–51 (.370)	16–26 (.381)		
Larry Davis (Southern Conference) (1997–2006)
1997–98	Larry Davis	9–20	5–9	4th (South)	
1998–99	Larry Davis	12–16	5–11	5th (South)	
1999–2000	Larry Davis	14–18	5–10	6th (South)	
2000–01	Larry Davis	10–16	5–11	6th (South)	
2001–02	Larry Davis	17–14	7–9	5th (South)	
2002–03	Larry Davis	14–17	8–8	3rd (South)	
2003–04	Larry Davis	17–12	8–8	4th (South)	
2004–05	Larry Davis	16–13	9–7	4th (South)	
2005–06	Larry Davis	15–13	8–7	4th (South)	
Larry Davis:		124–139 (.471)	60–80 (.429)		
Jeff Jackson (Southern Conference) (2006–2013)
2006–07	Jeff Jackson	15–16	8–10	3rd (South)	
2007–08	Jeff Jackson	7–23	6–14	5th (South)	
2008–09	Jeff Jackson	6–24	4–16	5th (South)	
2009–10	Jeff Jackson	13–17	7–11	5th (South)	
2010–11	Jeff Jackson	22–11	12–6	3rd (South)	CIT first round
2011–12	Jeff Jackson	15–16	8–10	5th (South)	
2012–13	Jeff Jackson	7–24	3–15	6th (South)	
Jeff Jackson:		85–131 (.394)	48–82 (.369)		
Niko Medved (Southern Conference) (2013–2017)
2013–14	Niko Medved	9–21	3–13	10th	
2014–15	Niko Medved	11–22	5–13	10th	
2015–16	Niko Medved	19–16	11–7	T–3rd	CIT second round
2016–17	Niko Medved; Bob Richey	23–12^{[Note A]}	14–4	T–1st	CIT semifinal
Niko Medved:		62–70 (.470)	33–37 (.471)		
Bob Richey (Southern Conference) (2017–present)
2017–18	Bob Richey	23–10	13–5	3rd	
2018–19	Bob Richey	25–8	13–5	T–3rd	NIT first round
2019–20	Bob Richey	25–7	15–3	2nd	
2020–21	Bob Richey	16–9	10–5	3rd	
2021–22	Bob Richey	22–12	12–6	2nd	
2022–23	Bob Richey	28–8	15–3	T–1st	NCAA Division I Round of 32
2023–24	Bob Richey	17–16	10–8	T–5th	
2024–25	Bob Richey	25–10	11–7	5th	NIT first round
2025–26	Bob Richey	22–13	10–8	T–5th	NCAA Division I First round
Bob Richey:		203–94 (.684)	109–50 (.686)		
Total:		1,409–1,352			
National champion Postseason invitational champion Conference regular season champion Conference regular season and conference tournament champion Division regular season champion Division regular season and conference tournament champion Conference tournament champion

^A. Medved left for Drake after Furman reached the semifinals; interim coach Bob Richey coached the semifinal against Saint Peter's.
