= Dick Harlow =

American football player and coach (1889–1962)

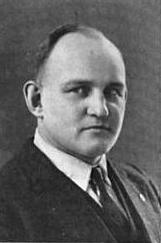
- Harlow in 1920

Biographical details
- Born: October 19, 1889; Philadelphia, Pennsylvania, U.S.
- Died: February 19, 1962 (aged 72); Bethesda, Maryland, U.S.

Playing career

Football
- 1910–1911: Penn State
- Position: Tackle

Coaching career (HC unless noted)

Football
- 1912–1914: Penn State (assistant)
- 1915–1917: Penn State
- 1918: Virginia Tech (assistant)
- 1919–1921: Penn State (assistant)
- 1922–1925: Colgate
- 1926–1934: Western Maryland
- 1935–1942: Harvard
- 1945–1947: Harvard

Boxing
- 1919–1921: Penn State
- 1922–1925: Colgate

Head coaching record
- Overall: 149–69–17

Accomplishments and honors

Awards
- Amos Alonzo Stagg Award (1949); AFCA Coach of the Year (1936)
- College Football Hall of Fame; Inducted in 1954 (profile)

Richard Cresson Harlow (October 19, 1889 – February 19, 1962) was an American football player and coach, as well as an oologist. Harlow served as the head coach at Pennsylvania State University (1915–1917), Colgate University (1922–1925), Western Maryland College (1926–1934), and Harvard University (1935–1942, 1945–1947). He is credited with pioneering modern defensive schemes. Often fielding undersized teams, Harlow coordinated stunts to avoid blockers, rather than trying to overpower them. His offensive style utilized shifts, reverses, and lateral passes. Harlow was inducted into the College Football Hall of Fame as a coach in 1954.

== Early years ==
A native of Philadelphia, Harlow attended Pennsylvania State University, where he played football for the Nittany Lions, under Bill and Jack Hollenback. As a tackle, Harlow distinguished himself during the 1910 and 1911 seasons. In the latter year, the team went undefeated and won the national title. A two-year letterman, he also was a member of the baseball and track and field teams, as well as the Phi Sigma Kappa fraternity.

== Coaching career ==
=== Penn State ===
Upon graduation from Penn State, Harlow remained with the Nittany Lions as an assistant football coach for three seasons, under his former coach Bill Hollenback. Harlow succeeded him as head coach in 1915, and hired Lawrence Whitney as an assistant. After compiling a combined 20–8 record in three seasons, Harlow entered the United States Army in 1918, and was stationed at Virginia Polytechnic Institute and State University, where he was an assistant coach for Charles A. Bernier. After an honorable discharge, Harlow returned to Penn State in the following year, again as an assistant, but this time under coach Hugo Bezdek. Harlow also became the boxing coach at that time.

=== Colgate ===
Harlow left Penn State to become the 20th head coach at Colgate University from 1922 to 1925, succeeding Ellery Huntington Jr. For the first two seasons, Harlow hired Punk Berryman as assistant. Harlow coached the team to a 55–0 victory over Niagara University, where players refused to tackle any Colgate players, leading to many scores. Harlow's overall coaching record at Colgate was 24–9–3. He also served as Colgate's boxing coach from 1922 to 1925.

=== Western Maryland ===
Harlow moved from Colgate to become the head coach at Western Maryland College from 1926 to 1934, succeeding Ken Shroyer. There, Harlow coached the Green Terror to a 60–13–7 record with three undefeated seasons. In 1934 Western Maryland was invited to play in the inguinal Orange Bowl. Seeing it as not much of a challenge; Harlow declined to have his players play in then more prestigious East–West Shrine Game. In Orange Bowl, Bucknell, who lost to the Green Terror early that season, beat the Miami Hurricanes.

Harlow had many great players such as Eugene "Stoney" Willis, who threw the first shovel pass against Boston College in 1932, and Bill Shepherd, who was considered to be one of the best running backs in the country in the early 1930s, starring the East West shrine game in 1934 behind Michigan center Gerald Ford. At Western Maryland, Harlow also coached Rip Engle. He had a great influence on Engle's career, and they remained good friends for many years. Harlow said that his "biggest thrill" came from those games where he beat Bosten College and Bucknell by such a lopsided margin.

=== Harvard ===
In 1935, Harlow became the first non-alumnus ever to coach at Harvard. The job was initially offered to Clark Shaughnessy, but was turned down. Harlow's assistant coaches immediately became Henry Lamar and Skip Stahley. Lamar took over as head coach while Harlow served in the United States Navy during World War II. When Harlow returned, Lamar went back to being an assistant. From 1938 to 1946, Lyal Clark also served as an assistant. At Harvard, Harlow was voted Coach of the Year in 1936, and a year later, was chosen as the Ivy League Coach of the Year. He retired in 1947 with a lifetime record of 149–69–17, and was succeeded by Arthur Valpey. Harlow was named to the College Football Hall of Fame in 1954.

== Oology career ==
Harlow was an expert in oology, the study of birds' eggs. In 1939, he was named curator of oology at the Harvard's Museum of Comparative Zoology, and he remained in that position until 1954.

== Head coaching record ==
Year	Team	Overall	Conference	Standing	Bowl/playoffs
Penn State Nittany Lions (Independent) (1915–1917)
1915	Penn State	7–2			
1916	Penn State	8–2			
1917	Penn State	5–4			
Penn State:		20–8			
Colgate (Independent) (1922–1925)
1922	Colgate	6–3			
1923	Colgate	6–2–1			
1924	Colgate	5–4			
1925	Colgate	7–0–2			
Colgate:		24–9–3			
Western Maryland Green Terror (Independent) (1926–1934)
1926	Western Maryland	6–1			
1927	Western Maryland	6–2			
1928	Western Maryland	6–2–1			
1929	Western Maryland	11–0			
1930	Western Maryland	9–0–1			
1931	Western Maryland	4–4–2			
1932	Western Maryland	5–1–2			
1933	Western Maryland	5–3			
1934	Western Maryland	8–0–1			
Western Maryland:		60–13–7			
Harvard Crimson (Independent) (1935–1942)
1935	Harvard	3–5			
1936	Harvard	3–4–1			
1937	Harvard	5–2–1			
1938	Harvard	4–4			
1939	Harvard	4–4			
1940	Harvard	3–2–3			
1941	Harvard	5–2–1			
1942	Harvard	2–6–1			
Harvard Crimson (Independent) (1945–1947)
1945	Harvard	5–3			
1946	Harvard	7–2			
1947	Harvard	4–5			
Harvard:		45–39–7			
Total:		149–69–17			

== See also ==
- List of college football head coaches with non-consecutive tenure
- List of Phi Sigma Kappa brothers
- List of presidents of the American Football Coaches Association
