= 1927 Southwestern Lynx football team =

American college football season

1927 Southwestern Lynx football
- Conference: Independent
- Record: 5–5–1
- Head coach: Jess Neely (4th season)

1927 Southern college football independents records
	Conf.			Overall
Team	W	L	T	W		L		T
Georgetown		–		8	–	1	–	0
Spring Hill		–		6	–	1	–	0
Wesley		–		6	–	1	–	0
Georgia Normal		–		6	–	1	–	1
George Washington		–		7	–	2	–	0
Texas A&I		–		4	–	1	–	0
Middle Tennessee State Teachers		–		6	–	2	–	0
Loyola (LA)		–		6	–	2	–	2
Navy		–		6	–	3	–	0
Catholic University		–		5	–	3	–	0
West Tennessee State Teachers		–		5	–	3	–	1
Texas Tech		–		5	–	4	–	0
Davidson		–		4	–	4	–	1
Delaware State		–		1	–	1	–	0
Howard		–		3	–	3	–	2
Southwestern (TN)		–		5	–	5	–	1
Texas Mines		–		2	–	2	–	2
Mississippi State Teachers		–		3	–	4	–	1
Duke		–		4	–	5	–	0
Miami (FL)		–		3	–	6	–	1
Delaware		–		2	–	5	–	1
East Tennessee State Teachers		–		2	–	5	–	0
Oglethorpe		–		2	–	6	–	0
Wake Forest		–		2	–	6	–	2

The 1927 Southwestern Lynx football team was an American football team that represented Southwestern University (now known as Rhodes College) as an Independent during the 1927 college football season. Led by Jess Neely in his second season as head coach, the Lynx compiled a record of 5–5–1.

== Schedule ==
Date	Time	Opponent	Site	Result	Attendance	Source
September 24		Lambuth	Fargason Field; Memphis, TN	W 40–12		
September 30		at Alabama	Denny Field; Tuscaloosa, AL	L 0–31		
October 8		Birmingham–Southern	Fargason Field; Memphis, TN	W 19–7		
October 15		Henderson-Brown	Fargason Field; Memphis, TN	L 0–15		
October 22		Ole Miss	Fargason Field; Memphis, TN	L 0–39		
October 29		Arkansas College	Fargason Field; Memphis, TN	W 24–6		
November 5		Ouachita Baptist	Fargason Field; Memphis, TN	T 12–12		
November 11	2:30 p.m.	West Tennessee State Teachers	Fargason Field; Memphis, TN	W 26–6	4,000	
November 18		Hendrix	Fargason Field; Memphis, TN	L 6–32		
November 24		at Millsaps	Jackson, MS	W 19–6		
November 26		Quantico Marines	Fargason Field; Memphis, TN	L 0–19		
All times are in Central time
