= 1927 Georgetown Blue and Gray football team =

American college football season

1927 Georgetown Blue and Gray football
- Conference: Independent
- Record: 8–1
- Head coach: Lou Little (4th season)
- Captain: Claude Grigsby
- Home stadium: Griffith Stadium

1927 Southern college football independents records
	Conf.			Overall
Team	W	L	T	W		L		T
Georgetown		–		8	–	1	–	0
Spring Hill		–		6	–	1	–	0
Wesley		–		6	–	1	–	0
Georgia Normal		–		6	–	1	–	1
George Washington		–		7	–	2	–	0
Texas A&I		–		4	–	1	–	0
Middle Tennessee State Teachers		–		6	–	2	–	0
Loyola (LA)		–		6	–	2	–	2
Navy		–		6	–	3	–	0
Catholic University		–		5	–	3	–	0
West Tennessee State Teachers		–		5	–	3	–	1
Texas Tech		–		5	–	4	–	0
Davidson		–		4	–	4	–	1
Delaware State		–		1	–	1	–	0
Howard		–		3	–	3	–	2
Southwestern (TN)		–		5	–	5	–	1
Texas Mines		–		2	–	2	–	2
Mississippi State Teachers		–		3	–	4	–	1
Duke		–		4	–	5	–	0
Miami (FL)		–		3	–	6	–	1
Delaware		–		2	–	5	–	1
East Tennessee State Teachers		–		2	–	5	–	0
Oglethorpe		–		2	–	6	–	0
Wake Forest		–		2	–	6	–	2

The 1927 Georgetown Blue and Gray football team represented Georgetown University as an independent during the 1927 college football season. Led by Lou Little in his fourth season as head coach, the team went 8–1.

== Schedule ==
Date	Opponent	Site	Result	Attendance	Source
September 24	Lenoir–Rhyne	Griffith Stadium; Washington, DC	W 80–0		
October 1	Susquehanna	Griffith Stadium; Washington, DC	W 57–0		
October 8	Davis & Elkins	Griffith Stadium; Washington, DC	W 19–0		
October 15	at Syracuse	Archbold Stadium; Syracuse, NY	L 6–19	15,000	
October 22	West Virginia	Griffith Stadium; Washington, DC	W 25–0	20,000	
October 29	Waynesburg	Griffith Stadium; Washington, DC	W 58–0		
November 5	Lafayette	Griffith Stadium; Washington, DC	W 27–2	15,000	
November 12	at Boston College	Braves Field; Boston, MA	W 47–0		
November 19	at Fordham	Polo Grounds; New York, NY	W 38–0	10,000	
