= 1927 Texas Mines Miners football team =

American college football season

1927 Texas Mines Miners football
- Conference: Independent
- Record: 2–2–2
- Head coach: E. J. Stewart (1st season)

1927 Southern college football independents records
	Conf.			Overall
Team	W	L	T	W		L		T
Georgetown		–		8	–	1	–	0
Spring Hill		–		6	–	1	–	0
Wesley		–		6	–	1	–	0
Georgia Normal		–		6	–	1	–	1
George Washington		–		7	–	2	–	0
Texas A&I		–		4	–	1	–	0
Middle Tennessee State Teachers		–		6	–	2	–	0
Loyola (LA)		–		6	–	2	–	2
Navy		–		6	–	3	–	0
Catholic University		–		5	–	3	–	0
West Tennessee State Teachers		–		5	–	3	–	1
Texas Tech		–		5	–	4	–	0
Davidson		–		4	–	4	–	1
Delaware State		–		1	–	1	–	0
Howard		–		3	–	3	–	2
Southwestern (TN)		–		5	–	5	–	1
Texas Mines		–		2	–	2	–	2
Mississippi State Teachers		–		3	–	4	–	1
Duke		–		4	–	5	–	0
Miami (FL)		–		3	–	6	–	1
Delaware		–		2	–	5	–	1
East Tennessee State Teachers		–		2	–	5	–	0
Oglethorpe		–		2	–	6	–	0
Wake Forest		–		2	–	6	–	2

The 1927 Texas Mines Miners football team was an American football team that represented Texas School of Mines (now known as the University of Texas at El Paso) as an independent during the 1927 college football season. Texas Mines hired E. J. Stewart as its coach for the 1927 season. Stewart had been the head football coach at the University of Texas from 1923 to 1926. In its first season under Stewart, the team compiled a 2–2–2 record and was outscored by a total of 78 to 69. The team won its annual rivalry game with New Mexico A&M by a 19-7 score.

== Schedule ==
Date	Opponent	Site	Result	Source
October 6	Arizona	El Paso High School Stadium; El Paso, TX	L 6–28	
October 22	New Mexico	El Paso High School Stadium; El Paso, TX	T 6–6	
October 29	New Mexico Military	El Paso High School Stadium; El Paso, TX	W 19–3	
November 11	New Mexico A&M	El Paso High School Stadium; El Paso, TX (rivalry)	W 19–7	
November 19	Simmons (TX)	El Paso High School Stadium; El Paso, TX	L 19–34	
November 24	Tempe State	El Paso High School Stadium; El Paso, TX	T 0–0	
