= 1927 Birmingham–Southern Panthers football team =

American college football season

1927 Birmingham–Southern Panthers football
- Conference: Southern Intercollegiate Athletic Association
- Record: 3–6 (2–4 SIAA)
- Head coach: Harold Drew (4th season)
- Home stadium: Rickwood Field

1927 Southern Intercollegiate Athletic Association football standings
	Conf.					Overall
Team	W		L		T	W		L		T
Mississippi College +	8	–	0	–	0	8	–	0	–	0
Chattanooga +	5	–	0	–	0	8	–	1	–	0
Centenary +	4	–	0	–	0	10	–	0	–	0
Furman +	3	–	0	–	0	10	–	1	–	0
Georgetown (KY)	1	–	0	–	0	1	–	0	–	1
Stetson	4	–	0	–	1	6	–	0	–	1
Loyola (LA)	1	–	0	–	1	6	–	2	–	2
Wofford	2	–	1	–	2	2	–	4	–	3
Presbyterian	2	–	2	–	1	3	–	3	–	3
Mercer	2	–	2	–	0	5	–	4	–	0
Louisville	2	–	2	–	0	4	–	4	–	0
Louisiana College	1	–	1	–	0	1	–	1	–	0
Union (TN)	2	–	3	–	0	6	–	4	–	0
The Citadel	2	–	3	–	1	3	–	6	–	1
Centre	2	–	3	–	0	3	–	6	–	0
Howard (AL)	1	–	2	–	1	7	–	2	–	2
Southern College	2	–	4	–	1	2	–	5	–	1
Birmingham–Southern	2	–	4	–	0	3	–	6	–	0
Western Kentucky State Normal	2	–	4	–	0	5	–	4	–	0
Erskine	1	–	2	–	1	2	–	4	–	1
Louisiana Tech	1	–	3	–	0	3	–	5	–	0
SW Louisiana	1	–	4	–	0	2	–	7	–	1
Millsaps	1	–	5	–	0	3	–	8	–	0
Rollins	0	–	2	–	0	1	–	5	–	0
Transylvania	0	–	5	–	0	0	–	9	–	0
Newberry	0	–	6	–	0	0	–	8	–	1
Kentucky Wesleyan	0	–	0	–	0	0	–	0	–	0
+ – Conference co-champions

The 1927 Birmingham–Southern Panthers football team was an American football team that represented Birmingham–Southern College as a member of the Southern Intercollegiate Athletic Association during the 1927 college football season. In their fourth season under head coach Harold Drew, the team compiled a 3–6 record.

== Schedule ==
Date	Opponent	Site	Result	Source
September 24	at Marion*	Rowell Field; Selma, AL	W 14–0	
October 1	at Mississippi A&M*	Scott Field; Starkville MS	L 0–27	
October 8	at Southwestern (TN)*	Fargason Field; Memphis, TN	L 7–19	
October 15	Centre	Rickwood Field; Birmingham, AL	W 20–0	
October 22	at Chattanooga	Chamberlain Field; Chattanooga, TN	L 8–12	
October 28	at Centenary	Centenary Field; Shreveport, LA	L 7–27	
November 4	at Millsaps	Jackson, MS	W 13–0	
November 11	Mississippi College	Rickwood Field; Birmingham, AL	L 19–33	
November 19	vs. Howard (AL)	Legion Field; Birmingham, AL	L 0–9	
*Non-conference game
