= Harry W. Crum =

American football player and sports coach (1899–1968)

Biographical details
- Born: July 10, 1899; Derry, Pennsylvania, U.S.
- Died: February 14, 1968 (aged 68); New Kensington, Pennsylvania, U.S.

Playing career

Football
- 1922: Princeton
- Position: Halfback

Coaching career (HC unless noted)

Football
- 1924–1928: George Washington
- 1929–1931: Allegheny
- 1933: Hurst HS (PA)

Basketball
- 1927–1929: George Washington

Head coaching record
- Overall: 40–25–7 (college football); 13–14 (college basketball)

Accomplishments and honors

Championships
- National (1922)

Harry Watson "Maud" Crum (July 10, 1899 – February 14, 1968) was an American football player and coach of football and basketball. He served as the head football coach at George Washington University from 1924 to 1928 and at Allegheny College from 1929 to 1931, compiling a career college football record of 40–25–7. Crum was also the head basketball coach at George Washington from 1927 to 1929, tally a mark of 13–14.

== Coaching career ==
Crum accepted the position of head football coach at the George Washington University in 1924. He was the first to remain in that position with the "Hatchetites" for more than four years. He then coached the football team at Allegheny College in Meadville, Pennsylvania. He held that position for three seasons, from 1929 until 1931. His coaching record at Allegheny was 14–7–4.

== Later life and death ==
Crum died in 1968 at a hospital in New Kensington, Pennsylvania. In his later years he had worked as an attorney.

== Head coaching record ==
=== Football ===
Year	Team	Overall	Conference	Standing	Bowl/playoffs
George Washington Hatchetites / Colonials (Independent) (1924–1928)
1924	George Washington	6–3–1			
1925	George Washington	6–2–2			
1926	George Washington	5–4			
1927	George Washington	7–2			
1928	George Washington	1–7			
George Washington:		25–18–3			
Allegheny Gators (Independent) (1929–1931)
1929	Allegheny	2–4–2			
1930	Allegheny	6–2			
1931	Allegheny	6–1–2			
Allegheny:		14–7–4			
Total:		39–25–7			
