= 1927 Wesley Wildcats football team =

American college football season

1927 Wesley Wildcats football
- Conference: Independent
- Record: 6–1
- Head coach: Josh S. Faulkner (2nd season)
- Captain: Bard

1927 Southern college football independents records
	Conf.			Overall
Team	W	L	T	W		L		T
Georgetown		–		8	–	1	–	0
Spring Hill		–		6	–	1	–	0
Wesley		–		6	–	1	–	0
Georgia Normal		–		6	–	1	–	1
George Washington		–		7	–	2	–	0
Texas A&I		–		4	–	1	–	0
Middle Tennessee State Teachers		–		6	–	2	–	0
Loyola (LA)		–		6	–	2	–	2
Navy		–		6	–	3	–	0
Catholic University		–		5	–	3	–	0
West Tennessee State Teachers		–		5	–	3	–	1
Texas Tech		–		5	–	4	–	0
Davidson		–		4	–	4	–	1
Delaware State		–		1	–	1	–	0
Howard		–		3	–	3	–	2
Southwestern (TN)		–		5	–	5	–	1
Texas Mines		–		2	–	2	–	2
Mississippi State Teachers		–		3	–	4	–	1
Duke		–		4	–	5	–	0
Miami (FL)		–		3	–	6	–	1
Delaware		–		2	–	5	–	1
East Tennessee State Teachers		–		2	–	5	–	0
Oglethorpe		–		2	–	6	–	0
Wake Forest		–		2	–	6	–	2

The 1927 Wesley Wildcats football team represented Wesley Collegiate Institute (later known as Wesley College) in the 1927 college football season as an independent. Led by coach Josh S. Faulkner his second year, the Wildcats compiled a 6–1 record.

== Schedule ==
Date	Time	Opponent	Site	Result	Source
October 8	2:30 p.m.	Union Gardens AA	Dover Baseball Park; Dover, DE	W 26–0	
October 14		Newark High School		W 6–0	
c. October 22		Laurel High School		W 18–0	
October 29		at Wilmington High School	Pennsy Field; Wilmington, DE	L 0–8	
November 5		Delaware JV	Dover, DE	W 20–18	
November 12		Ridley Park Scholastics		W 18–0	
November 18		at Goldey College	Baynard Stadium; Wilmington, DE	W 27–0	
