= 1927 Delaware Fightin' Blue Hens football team =

American college football season

1927 Delaware Fightin' Blue Hens football
- Conference: Independent
- Record: 2–5–1
- Head coach: Joseph J. Rothrock (1st season)
- Home stadium: Frazer Field

1927 Southern college football independents records
	Conf.			Overall
Team	W	L	T	W		L		T
Georgetown		–		8	–	1	–	0
Spring Hill		–		6	–	1	–	0
Wesley		–		6	–	1	–	0
Georgia Normal		–		6	–	1	–	1
George Washington		–		7	–	2	–	0
Texas A&I		–		4	–	1	–	0
Middle Tennessee State Teachers		–		6	–	2	–	0
Loyola (LA)		–		6	–	2	–	2
Navy		–		6	–	3	–	0
Catholic University		–		5	–	3	–	0
West Tennessee State Teachers		–		5	–	3	–	1
Texas Tech		–		5	–	4	–	0
Davidson		–		4	–	4	–	1
Delaware State		–		1	–	1	–	0
Howard		–		3	–	3	–	2
Southwestern (TN)		–		5	–	5	–	1
Texas Mines		–		2	–	2	–	2
Mississippi State Teachers		–		3	–	4	–	1
Duke		–		4	–	5	–	0
Miami (FL)		–		3	–	6	–	1
Delaware		–		2	–	5	–	1
East Tennessee State Teachers		–		2	–	5	–	0
Oglethorpe		–		2	–	6	–	0
Wake Forest		–		2	–	6	–	2

The 1927 Delaware Fightin' Blue Hens football team was an American football team that represented the University of Delaware in the 1927 college football season. In their first season under head coach Joseph J. Rothrock, the Blue Hens compiled a 2–5–1 record and were outscored by a total of 104 to 18. The team played its home games at Frazer Field in Newark, Delaware.

== Schedule ==
Date	Opponent	Site	Result	Attendance	Source
October 1	Saint Joseph's	Frazer Field; Newark, DE	W 6–0		
October 8	Ursinus	Frazer Field; Newark, DE	L 0–7		
October 15	at Hampden–Sydney	Hampden-Sydney, VA	L 0–20		
October 22	St. John's (MD)	Frazer Field; Newark, DE	T 0–0		
October 29	at Johns Hopkins	Baltimore, MD	L 0–36		
November 5	Swarthmore	Frazer Field; Newark, DE	L 0–7		
November 12	at Gallaudet	Washington, DC	W 12–7		
November 19	at Haverford	Haverford, PA	L 0–27		
