= 1927 Oglethorpe Stormy Petrels football team =

American college football season

1927 Oglethorpe Stormy Petrels football
- Conference: Independent
- Record: 2–6
- Head coach: Harry J. Robertson (4th season)
- Home stadium: Spiller Field

1927 Southern college football independents records
	Conf.			Overall
Team	W	L	T	W		L		T
Georgetown		–		8	–	1	–	0
Spring Hill		–		6	–	1	–	0
Wesley		–		6	–	1	–	0
Georgia Normal		–		6	–	1	–	1
George Washington		–		7	–	2	–	0
Texas A&I		–		4	–	1	–	0
Middle Tennessee State Teachers		–		6	–	2	–	0
Loyola (LA)		–		6	–	2	–	2
Navy		–		6	–	3	–	0
Catholic University		–		5	–	3	–	0
West Tennessee State Teachers		–		5	–	3	–	1
Texas Tech		–		5	–	4	–	0
Davidson		–		4	–	4	–	1
Delaware State		–		1	–	1	–	0
Howard		–		3	–	3	–	2
Southwestern (TN)		–		5	–	5	–	1
Texas Mines		–		2	–	2	–	2
Mississippi State Teachers		–		3	–	4	–	1
Duke		–		4	–	5	–	0
Miami (FL)		–		3	–	6	–	1
Delaware		–		2	–	5	–	1
East Tennessee State Teachers		–		2	–	5	–	0
Oglethorpe		–		2	–	6	–	0
Wake Forest		–		2	–	6	–	2

The 1927 Oglethorpe Stormy Petrels football team was an American football team that represented Oglethorpe University as an independent during the 1927 college football season. In their fourth year under head coach Harry J. Robertson, the team compiled an overall record of 2–6.

== Schedule ==
Date	Opponent	Site	Result	Attendance	Source
October 15	at The Citadel	Johnson Hagood Stadium; Charleston, SC	L 0–19	6,000	
October 22	at St. Xavier	Corcoran Field; Cincinnati, OH	L 0–35	4,500	
October 29	Furman	Spiller Field; Atlanta, GA	L 0–19	5,000	
November 5	Presbyterian	Spiller Field; Atlanta, GA	W 12–6		
November 11	Mercer	Centennial Stadium; Macon, GA	L 6–21	7,000	
November 19	at Georgia Tech	Grant Field; Atlanta, GA	L 7–19		
November 24	at Chattanooga	Chamberlain Field; Chattanooga, TN	L 0–19		
December 3	at Miami (FL)	University Stadium; Coral Gables, FL	W 13–0		
