= 1927 Furman Purple Hurricane football team =

American college football season

1927 Furman Purple Hurricane football

SIAA co-champion
- Conference: Southern Intercollegiate Athletic Association
- Record: 10–1 (3–0 SIAA)
- Head coach: Billy Laval (13th season)
- Captain: Oscar Pipkins
- Home stadium: Manly Field

1927 Southern Intercollegiate Athletic Association football standings
| | Conf. | | | | | Overall |
| Team | W | | L | | T | W | | L | | T |
|---|---|---|---|---|---|---|---|---|---|---|
| Mississippi College + | 8 | – | 0 | – | 0 | 8 | – | 0 | – | 0 |
| Chattanooga + | 5 | – | 0 | – | 0 | 8 | – | 1 | – | 0 |
| Centenary + | 4 | – | 0 | – | 0 | 10 | – | 0 | – | 0 |
| Furman + | 3 | – | 0 | – | 0 | 10 | – | 1 | – | 0 |
| Georgetown (KY) | 1 | – | 0 | – | 0 | 1 | – | 0 | – | 1 |
| Stetson | 4 | – | 0 | – | 1 | 6 | – | 0 | – | 1 |
| Loyola (LA) | 1 | – | 0 | – | 1 | 6 | – | 2 | – | 2 |
| Wofford | 2 | – | 1 | – | 2 | 2 | – | 4 | – | 3 |
| Presbyterian | 2 | – | 2 | – | 1 | 3 | – | 3 | – | 3 |
| Mercer | 2 | – | 2 | – | 0 | 5 | – | 4 | – | 0 |
| Louisville | 2 | – | 2 | – | 0 | 4 | – | 4 | – | 0 |
| Louisiana College | 1 | – | 1 | – | 0 | 1 | – | 1 | – | 0 |
| Union (TN) | 2 | – | 3 | – | 0 | 6 | – | 4 | – | 0 |
| The Citadel | 2 | – | 3 | – | 1 | 3 | – | 6 | – | 1 |
| Centre | 2 | – | 3 | – | 0 | 3 | – | 6 | – | 0 |
| Howard (AL) | 1 | – | 2 | – | 1 | 7 | – | 2 | – | 2 |
| Southern College | 2 | – | 4 | – | 1 | 2 | – | 5 | – | 1 |
| Birmingham–Southern | 2 | – | 4 | – | 0 | 3 | – | 6 | – | 0 |
| Western Kentucky State Normal | 2 | – | 4 | – | 0 | 5 | – | 4 | – | 0 |
| Erskine | 1 | – | 2 | – | 1 | 2 | – | 4 | – | 1 |
| Louisiana Tech | 1 | – | 3 | – | 0 | 3 | – | 5 | – | 0 |
| SW Louisiana | 1 | – | 4 | – | 0 | 2 | – | 7 | – | 1 |
| Millsaps | 1 | – | 5 | – | 0 | 3 | – | 8 | – | 0 |
| Rollins | 0 | – | 2 | – | 0 | 1 | – | 5 | – | 0 |
| Transylvania | 0 | – | 5 | – | 0 | 0 | – | 9 | – | 0 |
| Newberry | 0 | – | 6 | – | 0 | 0 | – | 8 | – | 1 |
| Kentucky Wesleyan | 0 | – | 0 | – | 0 | 0 | – | 0 | – | 0 |
+ – Conference co-champions

The 1927 Furman Purple Hurricane football team represented the Furman University as a member of the Southern Intercollegiate Athletic Association (SIAA) during the 1927 college football season. Led by 13th-year head coach Billy Laval, the Purple Hurricane compiled an overall record of 10–1 with a mark of 3–0 in conference play, sharing the SIAA title with Centenary, Chattanooga, and Mississippi College. Furman outscored its opponents 283 to 59.

Quarterback Whitey Rawl scored three touchdowns in the victory over SIAA co-champion NC State, and the game's only touchdown in the win over The Citadel. In the season's only loss, to the "Dream and Wonder" team of Georgia, Furman was twice within Georgia's 5-yard line.

== Schedule ==
| Date | Opponent | Site | Result | Attendance | Source |
|---|---|---|---|---|---|
| September 23 | at Duke* | Hanes Field; Durham, NC | W 13–7 | | |
| September 30 | NC State* | Manly Field; Greenville, SC | W 20–0 | 3,000 | |
| October 8 | at Mercer | Centennial Stadium; Macon, GA | W 26–13 | | |
| October 15 | at Georgia* | Sanford Field; Athens, GA | L 0–32 | | |
| October 22 | Erskine | Manly Field; Greenville, SC | W 47–0 | | |
| October 29 | at Oglethorpe* | Spiller Field; Atlanta, GA | W 19–0 | 5,000 | |
| November 5 | Wake Forest* | Manly Field; Greenville, SC | W 53–0 | | |
| November 12 | South Carolina* | Manly Field; Greenville, SC | W 33–0 | | |
| November 19 | at The Citadel | Johnson Hagood Stadium; Charleston, SC (rivalry) | W 6–0 | | |
| November 24 | Clemson* | Manly Field; Greenville, SC | W 28–0 | | |
| January 2 | at Miami (FL)* | University Stadium; Coral Gables, FL | W 38–7 | | |
*Non-conference game

== Players ==
=== Backfield ===
| Player | Position |
|---|---|
| Jim Blount | halfback |
| Harvey Capps | halfback |
| Oscar Pipkins | fullback |
| Whitey Rawl | quarterback |
