= 1927 Centenary Gentlemen football team =

American college football season

1927 Centenary Gentlemen football

SIAA co-champion
- Conference: Southern Intercollegiate Athletic Association
- Record: 10–0 (4–0 SIAA)
- Head coach: Homer Norton (2nd season)

1927 Southern Intercollegiate Athletic Association football standings
	Conf.					Overall
Team	W		L		T	W		L		T
Mississippi College +	8	–	0	–	0	8	–	0	–	0
Chattanooga +	5	–	0	–	0	8	–	1	–	0
Centenary +	4	–	0	–	0	10	–	0	–	0
Furman +	3	–	0	–	0	10	–	1	–	0
Georgetown (KY)	1	–	0	–	0	1	–	0	–	1
Stetson	4	–	0	–	1	6	–	0	–	1
Loyola (LA)	1	–	0	–	1	6	–	2	–	2
Wofford	2	–	1	–	2	2	–	4	–	3
Presbyterian	2	–	2	–	1	3	–	3	–	3
Mercer	2	–	2	–	0	5	–	4	–	0
Louisville	2	–	2	–	0	4	–	4	–	0
Louisiana College	1	–	1	–	0	1	–	1	–	0
Union (TN)	2	–	3	–	0	6	–	4	–	0
The Citadel	2	–	3	–	1	3	–	6	–	1
Centre	2	–	3	–	0	3	–	6	–	0
Howard (AL)	1	–	2	–	1	7	–	2	–	2
Southern College	2	–	4	–	1	2	–	5	–	1
Birmingham–Southern	2	–	4	–	0	3	–	6	–	0
Western Kentucky State Normal	2	–	4	–	0	5	–	4	–	0
Erskine	1	–	2	–	1	2	–	4	–	1
Louisiana Tech	1	–	3	–	0	3	–	5	–	0
SW Louisiana	1	–	4	–	0	2	–	7	–	1
Millsaps	1	–	5	–	0	3	–	8	–	0
Rollins	0	–	2	–	0	1	–	5	–	0
Transylvania	0	–	5	–	0	0	–	9	–	0
Newberry	0	–	6	–	0	0	–	8	–	1
Kentucky Wesleyan	0	–	0	–	0	0	–	0	–	0
+ – Conference co-champions

The 1927 Centenary Gentlemen football team represented the Centenary College of Louisiana as a member of the Southern Intercollegiate Athletic Association (SIAA) during the 1927 college football season. Centenary posted an undefeated 10–0 record and beat four Southwestern Conference schools. It is one of the school's best ever teams.

== Schedule ==
Date	Opponent	Site	Result	Attendance	Source
September 24	Sam Houston State*	Shreveport, LA	W 27–0	4,000	
October 1	Millsaps	Shreveport, LA	W 26–0		
October 8	SMU*	Shreveport, LA	W 21–12		
October 15	at Southern College	Lakeland, FL	W 26–0	3,500	
October 22	at Baylor*	Cotton Palace; Waco, TX	W 9–6		
October 28	Birmingham–Southern*	Shreveport, LA	W 27–7		
November 5	at Rice*	Rice Field; Houston, TX	W 33–7		
November 11	TCU*	Shreveport, LA	W 7–3		
November 19	Louisiana Tech	Shreveport, LA	W 33–0		
November 24	Louisville	Shreveport, LA	W 59–2	5,500	
*Non-conference game
