= 1927 Southwestern Louisiana Bulldogs football team =

American college football season

1927 Southwestern Louisiana Bulldogs football
- Conference: Southern Intercollegiate Athletic Association
- Record: 2–7–1 (1–4 SIAA)
- Head coach: T. R. Mobley (9th season)
- Home stadium: Campus Athletic Field

1927 Southern Intercollegiate Athletic Association football standings
	Conf.					Overall
Team	W		L		T	W		L		T
Mississippi College +	8	–	0	–	0	8	–	0	–	0
Chattanooga +	5	–	0	–	0	8	–	1	–	0
Centenary +	4	–	0	–	0	10	–	0	–	0
Furman +	3	–	0	–	0	10	–	1	–	0
Georgetown (KY)	1	–	0	–	0	1	–	0	–	1
Stetson	4	–	0	–	1	6	–	0	–	1
Loyola (LA)	1	–	0	–	1	6	–	2	–	2
Wofford	2	–	1	–	2	2	–	4	–	3
Presbyterian	2	–	2	–	1	3	–	3	–	3
Mercer	2	–	2	–	0	5	–	4	–	0
Louisville	2	–	2	–	0	4	–	4	–	0
Louisiana College	1	–	1	–	0	1	–	1	–	0
Union (TN)	2	–	3	–	0	6	–	4	–	0
The Citadel	2	–	3	–	1	3	–	6	–	1
Centre	2	–	3	–	0	3	–	6	–	0
Howard (AL)	1	–	2	–	1	7	–	2	–	2
Southern College	2	–	4	–	1	2	–	5	–	1
Birmingham–Southern	2	–	4	–	0	3	–	6	–	0
Western Kentucky State Normal	2	–	4	–	0	5	–	4	–	0
Erskine	1	–	2	–	1	2	–	4	–	1
Louisiana Tech	1	–	3	–	0	3	–	5	–	0
SW Louisiana	1	–	4	–	0	2	–	7	–	1
Millsaps	1	–	5	–	0	3	–	8	–	0
Rollins	0	–	2	–	0	1	–	5	–	0
Transylvania	0	–	5	–	0	0	–	9	–	0
Newberry	0	–	6	–	0	0	–	8	–	1
Kentucky Wesleyan	0	–	0	–	0	0	–	0	–	0
+ – Conference co-champions

The 1927 Southwestern Louisiana Bulldogs football team was an American football team that represented the Southwestern Louisiana Institute of Liberal and Technical Learning (now known as the University of Louisiana at Lafayette) in the Southern Intercollegiate Athletic Association during the 1927 college football season. In their ninth year under head coach T. R. Mobley, the team compiled a 2–7–1 record.

== Schedule ==
Date	Opponent	Site	Result	Source
September 24	Mississippi State Teachers*	Campus Athletic Field; Lafayette, LA	W 6–0	
October 1	at LSU*	Tiger Stadium; Baton Rouge, LA	L 0–52	
October 8	Spring Hill*	Campus Athletic Field; Lafayette, LA	L 0–19	
October 14	at Sam Houston State*	Pritchett Field; Huntsville, TX	L 0–25	
October 22	at Loyola (LA)	Loyola University Stadium; New Orleans, LA	L 0–28	
October 29	Louisiana College	Campus Athletic Field; Lafayette, LA	L 6–20	
November 5	at Louisiana Tech	Tech Field; Ruston, LA (rivalry)	L 0–13	
November 11	Millsaps	Campus Athletic Field; Lafayette, LA	W 12–6	
November 18	at Mississippi College	Provine Field; Clinton, MS	L 0–27	
November 24	at Louisiana Normal*	Normal Athletic Park; Natchitoches, LA	T 6–6	
*Non-conference game
