= 1927 Navy Midshipmen football team =

American college football season

1927 Navy Midshipmen football
- Conference: Independent
- Record: 6–3
- Head coach: Bill Ingram (2nd season)
- Captain: Ned Hannegan
- Home stadium: Thompson Stadium

1927 Southern college football independents records
	Conf.			Overall
Team	W	L	T	W		L		T
Georgetown		–		8	–	1	–	0
Spring Hill		–		6	–	1	–	0
Wesley		–		6	–	1	–	0
Georgia Normal		–		6	–	1	–	1
George Washington		–		7	–	2	–	0
Texas A&I		–		4	–	1	–	0
Middle Tennessee State Teachers		–		6	–	2	–	0
Loyola (LA)		–		6	–	2	–	2
Navy		–		6	–	3	–	0
Catholic University		–		5	–	3	–	0
West Tennessee State Teachers		–		5	–	3	–	1
Texas Tech		–		5	–	4	–	0
Davidson		–		4	–	4	–	1
Delaware State		–		1	–	1	–	0
Howard		–		3	–	3	–	2
Southwestern (TN)		–		5	–	5	–	1
Texas Mines		–		2	–	2	–	2
Mississippi State Teachers		–		3	–	4	–	1
Duke		–		4	–	5	–	0
Miami (FL)		–		3	–	6	–	1
Delaware		–		2	–	5	–	1
East Tennessee State Teachers		–		2	–	5	–	0
Oglethorpe		–		2	–	6	–	0
Wake Forest		–		2	–	6	–	2

The 1927 Navy Midshipmen football team represented the United States Naval Academy during the 1927 college football season. In their second season under head coach Bill Ingram, the Midshipmen compiled a 6–3 record, shut out two opponents, and outscored all opponents by a combined score of 192 to 84.

The annual Army–Navy Game was played on November 26 at the Polo Grounds in New York City; Army won 14–9.

== Schedule ==
Date	Opponent	Site	Result	Attendance	Source
October 1	Davis & Elkins	Thompson Stadium; Annapolis, MD	W 35–6		
October 8	Drake	Farragut Field; Annapolis, MD	W 27–0		
October 15	vs. Notre Dame	Municipal Stadium; Baltimore, MD (rivalry)	L 6–19	45,101	
October 22	Duke	Thompson Stadium; Annapolis, MD	W 32–6		
October 29	at Penn	Franklin Field; Philadelphia, PA	W 12–6		
November 5	West Virginia Wesleyan	Thompson Stadium; Annapolis, MD	W 26–0		
November 12	at Michigan	Michigan Stadium; Ann Arbor, MI	L 12–27	83,650	
November 19	Loyola (MD)	Thompson Stadium; Annapolis, MD	W 33–6		
November 26	vs. Army	Polo Grounds; New York, NY (Army–Navy Game)	L 9–14		
