= 1915 Furman Baptists football team =

American college football season

1915 Furman Baptists football
- Conference: Southern Intercollegiate Athletic Association
- Record: 5–3 (1–1 SIAA)
- Head coach: W. B. Bible (2nd season; first 7 games); Billy Laval (1st season, final game)
- Captain: William N. Gressette
- Home stadium: Augusta Street Park

1915 Southern Intercollegiate Athletic Association football standings
	Conf.					Overall
Team	W		L		T	W		L		T
Vanderbilt $	5	–	0	–	0	9	–	1	–	0
Alabama	5	–	0	–	0	6	–	2	–	0
LSU	4	–	0	–	0	6	–	2	–	0
Transylvania	3	–	0	–	1	7	–	1	–	1
Auburn	5	–	1	–	0	6	–	2	–	0
Georgia	3	–	1	–	1	5	–	2	–	2
Chattanooga	3	–	1	–	2	5	–	2	–	2
Mississippi A&M	4	–	2	–	1	5	–	2	–	1
Kentucky	2	–	1	–	1	6	–	1	–	1
Florida	3	–	3	–	0	4	–	3	–	0
Clemson	2	–	2	–	1	2	–	4	–	2
South Carolina	1	–	1	–	1	5	–	3	–	1
Furman	1	–	1	–	0	5	–	3	–	0
Mercer	2	–	3	–	0	5	–	4	–	0
Mississippi College	2	–	3	–	0	4	–	4	–	1
The Citadel	1	–	2	–	0	5	–	3	–	0
Sewanee	1	–	2	–	2	4	–	3	–	2
Tennessee	1	–	4	–	0	4	–	4	–	0
Tulane	1	–	4	–	0	4	–	4	–	0
Central University	0	–	3	–	1	3	–	5	–	1
Louisville	0	–	3	–	1	1	–	5	–	1
Howard (AL)	0	–	3	–	0	3	–	4	–	1
Wofford	0	–	3	–	0	3	–	5	–	0
Ole Miss	0	–	5	–	0	2	–	6	–	0
$ – Conference champion

The 1915 Furman Baptists football team represented Furman University during the 1915 college football season as a member of the Southern Intercollegiate Athletic Association (SIAA). Furman compiled an overall record of 5–3 with a mark of 1–1 in SIAA play. The team began the season led by second-year W. B. Bible, who also served as the school's athletic director. Bible resigned in mid-November, before Furman final game of the season. Assistant coach Billy Laval was elected to succeed Bible as head coach.

== Schedule ==
Date	Time	Opponent	Site	Result	Attendance	Source
September 25	4:00 p.m.	Clemson	Augusta Street Park; Greenville, SC	L 0–99		
October 2	4:00 p.m.	Erskine*	Augusta Street Park; Greenville, SC	W 60–0		
October 15	4:00 p.m.	Presbyterian*	Greenville, SC	L 12–20		
October 23	3:45 p.m.	at Bingham Military Institute*	Oates Park; Asheville, NC	W 20–6		
November 3	3:30 p.m.	Presbyterian*	Augusta Street Park; Greenville, SC	W 38–7		
November 6		at Davidson*	Davidson, NC	L 13–58		
November 13	3:30 p.m.	Newberry*	Augusta Street Park; Greenville, SC	W 7–0		
November 25	3:00 p.m.	Wofford	Greenville, SC (rivalry)	W 25–0	1,000	
*Non-conference game
