= 1927 Louisville Cardinals football team =

American college football season

1927 Louisville Cardinals football
- Conference: Southern Intercollegiate Athletic Association
- Record: 4–4 (2–2 SIAA)
- Head coach: Tom King (3rd season)

1927 Southern Intercollegiate Athletic Association football standings
| | Conf. | | | | | Overall |
| Team | W | | L | | T | W | | L | | T |
|---|---|---|---|---|---|---|---|---|---|---|
| Mississippi College + | 8 | – | 0 | – | 0 | 8 | – | 0 | – | 0 |
| Chattanooga + | 5 | – | 0 | – | 0 | 8 | – | 1 | – | 0 |
| Centenary + | 4 | – | 0 | – | 0 | 10 | – | 0 | – | 0 |
| Furman + | 3 | – | 0 | – | 0 | 10 | – | 1 | – | 0 |
| Georgetown (KY) | 1 | – | 0 | – | 0 | 1 | – | 0 | – | 1 |
| Stetson | 4 | – | 0 | – | 1 | 6 | – | 0 | – | 1 |
| Loyola (LA) | 1 | – | 0 | – | 1 | 6 | – | 2 | – | 2 |
| Wofford | 2 | – | 1 | – | 2 | 2 | – | 4 | – | 3 |
| Presbyterian | 2 | – | 2 | – | 1 | 3 | – | 3 | – | 3 |
| Mercer | 2 | – | 2 | – | 0 | 5 | – | 4 | – | 0 |
| Louisville | 2 | – | 2 | – | 0 | 4 | – | 4 | – | 0 |
| Louisiana College | 1 | – | 1 | – | 0 | 1 | – | 1 | – | 0 |
| Union (TN) | 2 | – | 3 | – | 0 | 6 | – | 4 | – | 0 |
| The Citadel | 2 | – | 3 | – | 1 | 3 | – | 6 | – | 1 |
| Centre | 2 | – | 3 | – | 0 | 3 | – | 6 | – | 0 |
| Howard (AL) | 1 | – | 2 | – | 1 | 7 | – | 2 | – | 2 |
| Southern College | 2 | – | 4 | – | 1 | 2 | – | 5 | – | 1 |
| Birmingham–Southern | 2 | – | 4 | – | 0 | 3 | – | 6 | – | 0 |
| Western Kentucky State Normal | 2 | – | 4 | – | 0 | 5 | – | 4 | – | 0 |
| Erskine | 1 | – | 2 | – | 1 | 2 | – | 4 | – | 1 |
| Louisiana Tech | 1 | – | 3 | – | 0 | 3 | – | 5 | – | 0 |
| SW Louisiana | 1 | – | 4 | – | 0 | 2 | – | 7 | – | 1 |
| Millsaps | 1 | – | 5 | – | 0 | 3 | – | 8 | – | 0 |
| Rollins | 0 | – | 2 | – | 0 | 1 | – | 5 | – | 0 |
| Transylvania | 0 | – | 5 | – | 0 | 0 | – | 9 | – | 0 |
| Newberry | 0 | – | 6 | – | 0 | 0 | – | 8 | – | 1 |
| Kentucky Wesleyan | 0 | – | 0 | – | 0 | 0 | – | 0 | – | 0 |
+ – Conference co-champions

The 1927 Louisville Cardinals football team was an American football team that represented the University of Louisville as a member of the Southern Intercollegiate Athletic Association (SIAA) during the 1927 college football season. In their third season under head coach Tom King, the Cardinals compiled a 4–4 record.

== Schedule ==
| Date | Opponent | Site | Result | Source |
|---|---|---|---|---|
| October 8 | Transylvania | Lexington, KY | W 25–6 | |
| October 15 | Murray State* | Louisville, KY | W 14–0 | |
| October 22 | at Marshall* | Huntington, WV | L 6–37 | |
| October 29 | Centre | Louisville, KY | W 40–7 | |
| November 5 | at Western Kentucky State Normal | Bowling Green, KY | L 6–7 | |
| November 12 | at Eastern Kentucky* | Richmond, KY | W 21–13 | |
| November 19 | Davis & Elkins* | Louisville, KY | L 0–32 | |
| November 24 | at Centenary | Shreveport, LA | L 2–59 | |
*Non-conference game
