= 1927 The Citadel Bulldogs football team =

American college football season

1927 The Citadel Bulldogs football
- Conference: Southern Intercollegiate Athletic Association
- Record: 3–6–1 (2–3–1 SIAA)
- Head coach: Carl Prause (6th season)
- Home stadium: Johnson Hagood Stadium

1927 Southern Intercollegiate Athletic Association football standings
	Conf.					Overall
Team	W		L		T	W		L		T
Mississippi College +	8	–	0	–	0	8	–	0	–	0
Chattanooga +	5	–	0	–	0	8	–	1	–	0
Centenary +	4	–	0	–	0	10	–	0	–	0
Furman +	3	–	0	–	0	10	–	1	–	0
Georgetown (KY)	1	–	0	–	0	1	–	0	–	1
Stetson	4	–	0	–	1	6	–	0	–	1
Loyola (LA)	1	–	0	–	1	6	–	2	–	2
Wofford	2	–	1	–	2	2	–	4	–	3
Presbyterian	2	–	2	–	1	3	–	3	–	3
Mercer	2	–	2	–	0	5	–	4	–	0
Louisville	2	–	2	–	0	4	–	4	–	0
Louisiana College	1	–	1	–	0	1	–	1	–	0
Union (TN)	2	–	3	–	0	6	–	4	–	0
The Citadel	2	–	3	–	1	3	–	6	–	1
Centre	2	–	3	–	0	3	–	6	–	0
Howard (AL)	1	–	2	–	1	7	–	2	–	2
Southern College	2	–	4	–	1	2	–	5	–	1
Birmingham–Southern	2	–	4	–	0	3	–	6	–	0
Western Kentucky State Normal	2	–	4	–	0	5	–	4	–	0
Erskine	1	–	2	–	1	2	–	4	–	1
Louisiana Tech	1	–	3	–	0	3	–	5	–	0
SW Louisiana	1	–	4	–	0	2	–	7	–	1
Millsaps	1	–	5	–	0	3	–	8	–	0
Rollins	0	–	2	–	0	1	–	5	–	0
Transylvania	0	–	5	–	0	0	–	9	–	0
Newberry	0	–	6	–	0	0	–	8	–	1
Kentucky Wesleyan	0	–	0	–	0	0	–	0	–	0
+ – Conference co-champions

The 1927 The Citadel Bulldogs football team represented The Citadel, The Military College of South Carolina in the 1927 college football season. Carl Prause served as head coach for the sixth season. The Bulldogs played as members of the Southern Intercollegiate Athletic Association. The City of Charleston opened a new stadium for the 1927 season. The Bulldogs claimed their first win in the stadium over Oglethorpe on October 15, also the day the stadium was dedicated.

== Schedule ==
Date	Opponent	Site	Result	Attendance	Source
September 24	vs. Davidson*	Gastonia H.S. Stadium; Gastonia, NC	L 0–5		
October 1	vs. Mercer	Municipal Stadium; Savannah, GA	L 0–6	5,000	
October 8	at Chattanooga	Chamberlain Field; Chattanooga, TN	L 6–31		
October 15	Oglethorpe	Johnson Hagood Stadium; Charleston, SC	W 19–0	6,000	
October 22	Newberry	Johnson Hagood Stadium; Charleston, SC	W 26–0		
October 27	vs. South Carolina*	County Fairgrounds; Orangeburg, SC	L 0–6		
November 5	at Clemson*	Johnson Hagood Stadium; Charleston, SC	L 0–13		
November 12	Wofford	Johnson Hagood Stadium; Charleston, SC (rivalry)	T 6–6		
November 19	Furman	Johnson Hagood Stadium; Charleston, SC (rivalry)	L 0–6		
November 24	Presbyterian	Johnson Hagood Stadium; Charleston, SC	W 7–6		
*Non-conference game
