= 1927 Wake Forest Demon Deacons football team =

American college football season

1927 Wake Forest Demon Deacons football
- Conference: Independent
- Record: 2–6–2
- Head coach: James A. Baldwin (2nd season)
- Captain: Austin G. Ober
- Home stadium: Gore Field

1927 Southern college football independents records
	Conf.			Overall
Team	W	L	T	W		L		T
Georgetown		–		8	–	1	–	0
Spring Hill		–		6	–	1	–	0
Wesley		–		6	–	1	–	0
Georgia Normal		–		6	–	1	–	1
George Washington		–		7	–	2	–	0
Texas A&I		–		4	–	1	–	0
Middle Tennessee State Teachers		–		6	–	2	–	0
Loyola (LA)		–		6	–	2	–	2
Navy		–		6	–	3	–	0
Catholic University		–		5	–	3	–	0
West Tennessee State Teachers		–		5	–	3	–	1
Texas Tech		–		5	–	4	–	0
Davidson		–		4	–	4	–	1
Delaware State		–		1	–	1	–	0
Howard		–		3	–	3	–	2
Southwestern (TN)		–		5	–	5	–	1
Texas Mines		–		2	–	2	–	2
Mississippi State Teachers		–		3	–	4	–	1
Duke		–		4	–	5	–	0
Miami (FL)		–		3	–	6	–	1
Delaware		–		2	–	5	–	1
East Tennessee State Teachers		–		2	–	5	–	0
Oglethorpe		–		2	–	6	–	0
Wake Forest		–		2	–	6	–	2

The 1927 Wake Forest Demon Deacons football team was an American football team that represented Wake Forest University during the 1927 college football season. In its second season under head coach James A. Baldwin, the team compiled a 2–6–2 record.

== Schedule ==
Date	Opponent	Site	Result	Attendance	Source
September 24	at North Carolina	Emerson Field; Chapel Hill, NC (rivalry)	W 9–8		
October 1	Elon	Gore Field; Wake Forest, NC	T 0–0		
October 7	vs. Presbyterian	Memorial Stadium; Asheville, NC	L 7–14	6,000	
October 13	at NC State	Riddick Stadium; Raleigh, NC (rivalry)	L 7–30		
October 22	vs. Davidson	World War Memorial Stadium; Greensboro, NC	T 13–13	8,000	
October 29	Duke	Gore Field; Wake Forest, NC (rivalry)	L 6–32		
November 5	at Furman	Manly Field; Greenville, SC	L 0–53		
November 11	vs. Quantico Marines	Tate Field; Richmond, VA	L 10–39	3,000	
November 19	High Point	Gore Field; Wake Forest, NC	W 13–7		–
November 24	vs. Mercer	Memorial Stadium; Asheville, NC	L 0–34	4,000	
