= 1927 Middle Tennessee State Teachers football team =

American college football season

1927 Middle Tennessee State Teachers football
- Conference: Independent
- Record: 6–2
- Head coach: Frank Faulkinberry (2nd season)
- Captain: Henry Hackman

1927 Southern college football independents records
	Conf.			Overall
Team	W	L	T	W		L		T
Georgetown		–		8	–	1	–	0
Spring Hill		–		6	–	1	–	0
Wesley		–		6	–	1	–	0
Georgia Normal		–		6	–	1	–	1
George Washington		–		7	–	2	–	0
Texas A&I		–		4	–	1	–	0
Middle Tennessee State Teachers		–		6	–	2	–	0
Loyola (LA)		–		6	–	2	–	2
Navy		–		6	–	3	–	0
Catholic University		–		5	–	3	–	0
West Tennessee State Teachers		–		5	–	3	–	1
Texas Tech		–		5	–	4	–	0
Davidson		–		4	–	4	–	1
Delaware State		–		1	–	1	–	0
Howard		–		3	–	3	–	2
Southwestern (TN)		–		5	–	5	–	1
Texas Mines		–		2	–	2	–	2
Mississippi State Teachers		–		3	–	4	–	1
Duke		–		4	–	5	–	0
Miami (FL)		–		3	–	6	–	1
Delaware		–		2	–	5	–	1
East Tennessee State Teachers		–		2	–	5	–	0
Oglethorpe		–		2	–	6	–	0
Wake Forest		–		2	–	6	–	2

The 1927 Middle Tennessee State Teachers football team represented the Middle Tennessee State Teachers College (now known as Middle Tennessee State University) during the 1927 college football season. The team captain was Henry Hackman.

== Schedule ==
Date	Opponent	Site	Result	Source
October 7	at Cumberland (TN)	Lebanon, TN	W 19–0	
	Jacksonville State	Murfreesboro, TN	W 13–0	
October 14	West Tennessee State Teachers	Murfreesboro, TN	W 47–7	
October 22	at Union (TN)	Jackson, TN	L 13–33	
	Florence State Normal	Murfreesboro, TN	W 72–0	
November 5	at Murray State	Cutchin Stadium; Murray, KY	L 7–14	
	Tennessee Tech	Murfreesboro, TN	W 13–0	
November 24	at Bryson	Fayetteville, TN	W 13–0	
