= 1927 Duke Blue Devils football team =

American college football season

1927 Duke Blue Devils football
- Conference: Independent
- Record: 4–5
- Head coach: Jimmy DeHart (2nd season)
- Captain: C. C. Bennett
- Home stadium: Hanes Field

1927 Southern college football independents records
	Conf.			Overall
Team	W	L	T	W		L		T
Georgetown		–		8	–	1	–	0
Spring Hill		–		6	–	1	–	0
Wesley		–		6	–	1	–	0
Georgia Normal		–		6	–	1	–	1
George Washington		–		7	–	2	–	0
Texas A&I		–		4	–	1	–	0
Middle Tennessee State Teachers		–		6	–	2	–	0
Loyola (LA)		–		6	–	2	–	2
Navy		–		6	–	3	–	0
Catholic University		–		5	–	3	–	0
West Tennessee State Teachers		–		5	–	3	–	1
Texas Tech		–		5	–	4	–	0
Davidson		–		4	–	4	–	1
Delaware State		–		1	–	1	–	0
Howard		–		3	–	3	–	2
Southwestern (TN)		–		5	–	5	–	1
Texas Mines		–		2	–	2	–	2
Mississippi State Teachers		–		3	–	4	–	1
Duke		–		4	–	5	–	0
Miami (FL)		–		3	–	6	–	1
Delaware		–		2	–	5	–	1
East Tennessee State Teachers		–		2	–	5	–	0
Oglethorpe		–		2	–	6	–	0
Wake Forest		–		2	–	6	–	2

The 1927 Duke Blue Devils football team was an American football team that represented Duke University as an independent during the 1927 college football season. In its second season under head coach Jimmy DeHart, the team compiled a 4–5 record and outscored opponents by a total of 215 to 117. C. C. Bennett was the team captain.

== Schedule ==
Date	Time	Opponent	Site	Result	Source
September 23		Furman	Hanes Field; Durham, NC	L 7–13	
October 1	2:30 p.m.	at Boston College	Fenway Park; Boston, MA	W 25–9	
October 8		at Washington & Lee	Wilson Field; Lexington, VA	L 7–12	
October 15		Richmond	Hanes Field; Durham, NC	W 72–0	
October 22		at Navy	Thompson Stadium; Annapolis, MD	L 6–32	
October 29		at Wake Forest	Gore Field; Wake Forest, NC (rivalry)	W 32–6	
November 11		NC State	Hanes Field; Durham, NC (rivalry)	L 18–20	
November 19		North Carolina^{†}	Hanes Field; Durham, NC (rivalry)	L 0–18	
November 24		at Davidson	Richardson Field; Davidson, NC	W 48–7	
^{†}Homecoming
