= 1927 Louisiana Tech Bulldogs football team =

American college football season

1927 Louisiana Tech Bulldogs football
- Conference: Southern Intercollegiate Athletic Association
- Record: 3–5 (1–3 SIAA)
- Head coach: Hugh E. Wilson (2nd season)
- Captain: Harrell P. Willis
- Home stadium: Tech Field

1927 Southern Intercollegiate Athletic Association football standings
	Conf.					Overall
Team	W		L		T	W		L		T
Mississippi College +	8	–	0	–	0	8	–	0	–	0
Chattanooga +	5	–	0	–	0	8	–	1	–	0
Centenary +	4	–	0	–	0	10	–	0	–	0
Furman +	3	–	0	–	0	10	–	1	–	0
Georgetown (KY)	1	–	0	–	0	1	–	0	–	1
Stetson	4	–	0	–	1	6	–	0	–	1
Loyola (LA)	1	–	0	–	1	6	–	2	–	2
Wofford	2	–	1	–	2	2	–	4	–	3
Presbyterian	2	–	2	–	1	3	–	3	–	3
Mercer	2	–	2	–	0	5	–	4	–	0
Louisville	2	–	2	–	0	4	–	4	–	0
Louisiana College	1	–	1	–	0	1	–	1	–	0
Union (TN)	2	–	3	–	0	6	–	4	–	0
The Citadel	2	–	3	–	1	3	–	6	–	1
Centre	2	–	3	–	0	3	–	6	–	0
Howard (AL)	1	–	2	–	1	7	–	2	–	2
Southern College	2	–	4	–	1	2	–	5	–	1
Birmingham–Southern	2	–	4	–	0	3	–	6	–	0
Western Kentucky State Normal	2	–	4	–	0	5	–	4	–	0
Erskine	1	–	2	–	1	2	–	4	–	1
Louisiana Tech	1	–	3	–	0	3	–	5	–	0
SW Louisiana	1	–	4	–	0	2	–	7	–	1
Millsaps	1	–	5	–	0	3	–	8	–	0
Rollins	0	–	2	–	0	1	–	5	–	0
Transylvania	0	–	5	–	0	0	–	9	–	0
Newberry	0	–	6	–	0	0	–	8	–	1
Kentucky Wesleyan	0	–	0	–	0	0	–	0	–	0
+ – Conference co-champions

The 1927 Louisiana Tech Bulldogs football team was an American football team that represented the Louisiana Polytechnic Institute—now known as Louisiana Tech University—as a member of the Southern Intercollegiate Athletic Association (SIAA) during the 1927 college football season. Led by Hugh E. Wilson in his second and final season as head coach, Louisiana Tech compiled an overall record of 3–5. The team's captain was Harrell P. Willis.

== Schedule ==
Date	Time	Opponent	Site	Result	Attendance	Source
September 24		at LSU*	Tiger Stadium; Baton Rouge, LA	L 0–45		
October 1		Clarke College (MS)*	Ruston, LA	W 30–0		
October 8		at Mississippi A&M*	Scott Field; Starkville, MS	L 0–14		
October 15		at Louisiana Normal*	Normal Athletic Park; Natchitoches, LA (rivalry)	W 33–0		
October 29	2:30 p.m.	vs. Mississippi College	Forsythe Park; Monroe, LA	L 0–7	7,700	
November 5		Southwestern Louisiana^{†}	Tech Field; Ruston, LA (rivalry)	W 13–0		
November 11		vs. Stetson	Jacksonville, FL	L 7–19		
November 19		at Centenary	Shreveport, LA	L 0–33		
*Non-conference game; ^{†}Homecoming; All times are in Central time
