= 1927 Mississippi State Teachers Yellow Jackets football team =

American college football season

1927 Mississippi State Teachers Yellow Jackets football
- Conference: Independent
- Record: 3–4–1
- Head coach: William Herschel Bobo (4th season)
- Home stadium: Kamper Park

1927 Southern college football independents records
	Conf.			Overall
Team	W	L	T	W		L		T
Georgetown		–		8	–	1	–	0
Spring Hill		–		6	–	1	–	0
Wesley		–		6	–	1	–	0
Georgia Normal		–		6	–	1	–	1
George Washington		–		7	–	2	–	0
Texas A&I		–		4	–	1	–	0
Middle Tennessee State Teachers		–		6	–	2	–	0
Loyola (LA)		–		6	–	2	–	2
Navy		–		6	–	3	–	0
Catholic University		–		5	–	3	–	0
West Tennessee State Teachers		–		5	–	3	–	1
Texas Tech		–		5	–	4	–	0
Davidson		–		4	–	4	–	1
Delaware State		–		1	–	1	–	0
Howard		–		3	–	3	–	2
Southwestern (TN)		–		5	–	5	–	1
Texas Mines		–		2	–	2	–	2
Mississippi State Teachers		–		3	–	4	–	1
Duke		–		4	–	5	–	0
Miami (FL)		–		3	–	6	–	1
Delaware		–		2	–	5	–	1
East Tennessee State Teachers		–		2	–	5	–	0
Oglethorpe		–		2	–	6	–	0
Wake Forest		–		2	–	6	–	2

The 1927 Mississippi State Teachers Yellow Jackets football team was an American football team that represented the Mississippi State Teachers College (now known as the University of Southern Mississippi) as an independent during the 1927 college football season. In their fourth year under head coach William Herschel Bobo, the team compiled a 3–4–1 record.

== Schedule ==
Date	Opponent	Site	Result	Attendance	Source
September 24	at Southwestern Louisiana	S.L.I. Stadium; Lafayette, LA	L 0–6		
October 1	Perkinston	Kamper Park; Hattiesburg, MS	T 0–0		
October 8	Hinds	Kamper Park; Hattiesburg, MS	W 12–0		
October 21	Mississippi A&M freshmen	Kamper Park; Hattiesburg, MS	L 0–24		
October 29	at Clarke College (MS)	Newton, MS	L 0–18		
November 5	at Spring Hill	Hartwell Field; Mobile, AL	L 0–37		
November 11	Pearl River	Kamper Park; Hattiesburg, MS	W 15–0	2,500	
November 18	at Saint Stanislaus College	Bay St. Louis, MS	W 25–13		
