= 1927 Chattanooga Moccasins football team =

American college football season

1927 Chattanooga Moccasins football

SIAA co-champion
- Conference: Southern Intercollegiate Athletic Association
- Record: 8–1 (5–0 SIAA)
- Head coach: Frank Thomas (3rd season)
- Captain: Clarence Lautsenhiser
- Home stadium: Chamberlain Field

1927 Southern Intercollegiate Athletic Association football standings
	Conf.					Overall
Team	W		L		T	W		L		T
Mississippi College +	8	–	0	–	0	8	–	0	–	0
Chattanooga +	5	–	0	–	0	8	–	1	–	0
Centenary +	4	–	0	–	0	10	–	0	–	0
Furman +	3	–	0	–	0	10	–	1	–	0
Georgetown (KY)	1	–	0	–	0	1	–	0	–	1
Stetson	4	–	0	–	1	6	–	0	–	1
Loyola (LA)	1	–	0	–	1	6	–	2	–	2
Wofford	2	–	1	–	2	2	–	4	–	3
Presbyterian	2	–	2	–	1	3	–	3	–	3
Mercer	2	–	2	–	0	5	–	4	–	0
Louisville	2	–	2	–	0	4	–	4	–	0
Louisiana College	1	–	1	–	0	1	–	1	–	0
Union (TN)	2	–	3	–	0	6	–	4	–	0
The Citadel	2	–	3	–	1	3	–	6	–	1
Centre	2	–	3	–	0	3	–	6	–	0
Howard (AL)	1	–	2	–	1	7	–	2	–	2
Southern College	2	–	4	–	1	2	–	5	–	1
Birmingham–Southern	2	–	4	–	0	3	–	6	–	0
Western Kentucky State Normal	2	–	4	–	0	5	–	4	–	0
Erskine	1	–	2	–	1	2	–	4	–	1
Louisiana Tech	1	–	3	–	0	3	–	5	–	0
SW Louisiana	1	–	4	–	0	2	–	7	–	1
Millsaps	1	–	5	–	0	3	–	8	–	0
Rollins	0	–	2	–	0	1	–	5	–	0
Transylvania	0	–	5	–	0	0	–	9	–	0
Newberry	0	–	6	–	0	0	–	8	–	1
Kentucky Wesleyan	0	–	0	–	0	0	–	0	–	0
+ – Conference co-champions

The 1927 Chattanooga Moccasins football team represented the University of Chattanooga as a member of the Southern Intercollegiate Athletic Association (SIAA) the 1927 college football season. The team tied for the SIAA championship.

== Schedule ==
Date	Opponent	Site	Result	Source
September 24	Vanderbilt*	Chamberlain Field; Chattanooga, TN	L 18–45	
September 30	Western Kentucky State Normal	Chamberlain Field; Chattanooga, TN	W 44–6	
October 8	The Citadel	Chamberlain Field; Chattanooga, TN	W 31–6	
October 15	Wofford	Chamberlain Field; Chattanooga, TN	W 38–7	
October 22	Birmingham–Southern	Chamberlain Field; Chattanooga, TN	W 12–8	
October 29	VPI	Chamberlain Field; Chattanooga, TN	W 14–13	
November 5	vs. William & Mary*	League Park; Norfolk, VA	W 12–7	
November 12	Southern College	Chamberlain Field; Chattanooga, TN	W 52–6	
November 24	Oglethorpe	Chamberlain Field; Chattanooga, TN	W 19–0	
*Non-conference game
