= 1927 Miami Hurricanes football team =

American college football season

1927 Miami Hurricanes football
- Conference: Independent
- Record: 3–6–1
- Head coach: Cub Buck (2nd season)
- Home stadium: University Stadium

1927 Southern college football independents records
	Conf.			Overall
Team	W	L	T	W		L		T
Georgetown		–		8	–	1	–	0
Spring Hill		–		6	–	1	–	0
Wesley		–		6	–	1	–	0
Georgia Normal		–		6	–	1	–	1
George Washington		–		7	–	2	–	0
Texas A&I		–		4	–	1	–	0
Middle Tennessee State Teachers		–		6	–	2	–	0
Loyola (LA)		–		6	–	2	–	2
Navy		–		6	–	3	–	0
Catholic University		–		5	–	3	–	0
West Tennessee State Teachers		–		5	–	3	–	1
Texas Tech		–		5	–	4	–	0
Davidson		–		4	–	4	–	1
Delaware State		–		1	–	1	–	0
Howard		–		3	–	3	–	2
Southwestern (TN)		–		5	–	5	–	1
Texas Mines		–		2	–	2	–	2
Mississippi State Teachers		–		3	–	4	–	1
Duke		–		4	–	5	–	0
Miami (FL)		–		3	–	6	–	1
Delaware		–		2	–	5	–	1
East Tennessee State Teachers		–		2	–	5	–	0
Oglethorpe		–		2	–	6	–	0
Wake Forest		–		2	–	6	–	2

The 1927 Miami Hurricanes football team was an American football team that represented the University of Miami as an independent during the 1927 college football season. In their second year under head coach Cub Buck, the team compiled a 3–6–1 record. It was the team's first varsity squad and they played their home games at University Stadium in Coral Gables, Florida.

== Schedule ==
Date	Opponent	Site	Result	Source
October 29	Rollins	University Stadium; Coral Gables, FL	W 39–3	
November 5	Piedmont	University Stadium; Coral Gables, FL	W 46–0	
November 11	Spring Hill	University Stadium; Coral Gables, FL	L 0–6	
November 19	Stetson	University Stadium; Coral Gables, FL	L 0–36	
November 24	Howard (AL)	University Stadium; Coral Gables, FL	L 0–52	
December 3	Oglethorpe	University Stadium; Coral Gables, FL	L 0–13	
December 10	Georgetown (KY)	University Stadium; Coral Gables, FL	T 7–7	
December 17	Millsaps	University Stadium; Coral Gables, FL	L 0–31	
December 26	Louisiana College	University Stadium; Coral Gables, FL	W 7–0	
January 2	Furman	University Stadium; Coral Gables, FL	L 7–39	
