= 1927 Howard Bulldogs football team =

American college football season

1927 Howard Bulldogs football
- Conference: Southern Intercollegiate Athletic Association
- Record: 7–2–2 (1–2–1 SIAA)
- Head coach: Chester C. Dillon (2nd season)
- Home stadium: Berry Field; Rickwood Field

1927 Southern Intercollegiate Athletic Association football standings
| | Conf. | | | | | Overall |
| Team | W | | L | | T | W | | L | | T |
|---|---|---|---|---|---|---|---|---|---|---|
| Mississippi College + | 8 | – | 0 | – | 0 | 8 | – | 0 | – | 0 |
| Chattanooga + | 5 | – | 0 | – | 0 | 8 | – | 1 | – | 0 |
| Centenary + | 4 | – | 0 | – | 0 | 10 | – | 0 | – | 0 |
| Furman + | 3 | – | 0 | – | 0 | 10 | – | 1 | – | 0 |
| Georgetown (KY) | 1 | – | 0 | – | 0 | 1 | – | 0 | – | 1 |
| Stetson | 4 | – | 0 | – | 1 | 6 | – | 0 | – | 1 |
| Loyola (LA) | 1 | – | 0 | – | 1 | 6 | – | 2 | – | 2 |
| Wofford | 2 | – | 1 | – | 2 | 2 | – | 4 | – | 3 |
| Presbyterian | 2 | – | 2 | – | 1 | 3 | – | 3 | – | 3 |
| Mercer | 2 | – | 2 | – | 0 | 5 | – | 4 | – | 0 |
| Louisville | 2 | – | 2 | – | 0 | 4 | – | 4 | – | 0 |
| Louisiana College | 1 | – | 1 | – | 0 | 1 | – | 1 | – | 0 |
| Union (TN) | 2 | – | 3 | – | 0 | 6 | – | 4 | – | 0 |
| The Citadel | 2 | – | 3 | – | 1 | 3 | – | 6 | – | 1 |
| Centre | 2 | – | 3 | – | 0 | 3 | – | 6 | – | 0 |
| Howard (AL) | 1 | – | 2 | – | 1 | 7 | – | 2 | – | 2 |
| Southern College | 2 | – | 4 | – | 1 | 2 | – | 5 | – | 1 |
| Birmingham–Southern | 2 | – | 4 | – | 0 | 3 | – | 6 | – | 0 |
| Western Kentucky State Normal | 2 | – | 4 | – | 0 | 5 | – | 4 | – | 0 |
| Erskine | 1 | – | 2 | – | 1 | 2 | – | 4 | – | 1 |
| Louisiana Tech | 1 | – | 3 | – | 0 | 3 | – | 5 | – | 0 |
| SW Louisiana | 1 | – | 4 | – | 0 | 2 | – | 7 | – | 1 |
| Millsaps | 1 | – | 5 | – | 0 | 3 | – | 8 | – | 0 |
| Rollins | 0 | – | 2 | – | 0 | 1 | – | 5 | – | 0 |
| Transylvania | 0 | – | 5 | – | 0 | 0 | – | 9 | – | 0 |
| Newberry | 0 | – | 6 | – | 0 | 0 | – | 8 | – | 1 |
| Kentucky Wesleyan | 0 | – | 0 | – | 0 | 0 | – | 0 | – | 0 |
+ – Conference co-champions

The 1927 Howard Bulldogs football team was an American football team that represented Howard College (now known as the Samford University) as a member of the Southern Intercollegiate Athletic Association (SIAA) during the 1927 college football season. In their second year under head coach Chester C. Dillon, the team compiled a 7–2–2 record. Their victory over Birmingham–Southern was played as the first game hosted at Legion Field.

== Schedule ==
| Date | Opponent | Site | Result | Source |
|---|---|---|---|---|
| September 24 | at Spring Hill* | Hartwell Field; Mobile, AL | W 37–0 | |
| October 1 | Loyola (LA) | Rickwood Field; Birmingham, AL | T 0–0 | |
| October 8 | at Millsaps | Jackson, MS | L 6–13 | |
| October 14 | Jacksonville State* | Berry Field; Birmingham, AL (rivalry) | W 43–0 | |
| October 22 | at Mercer | Centennial Stadium; Macon, GA | W 14–0 | |
| October 29 | Auburn* | Rickwood Field; Birmingham, AL | T 9–9 | |
| November 5 | at Mississippi College | Provine Field; Clinton, MS | L 0–13 | |
| November 11 | at Marion* | Rowell Field; Selma, AL | W 33–7 | |
| November 19 | vs. Birmingham–Southern | Legion Field; Birmingham, AL | W 9–0 | |
| November 24 | at Miami (FL)* | University Stadium; Coral Gables, FL | W 52–0 | |
| November 28 | at Universidad Nacional* | Vedado Tennis Club; Havana, Cuba | W 20–6 | |
*Non-conference game
