= 1927 George Washington Hatchetites football team =

American college football season

1927 George Washington Hatchetites football
- Conference: Independent
- Record: 7–2
- Head coach: Harry W. Crum (4th season)

1927 Southern college football independents records
	Conf.			Overall
Team	W	L	T	W		L		T
Georgetown		–		8	–	1	–	0
Spring Hill		–		6	–	1	–	0
Wesley		–		6	–	1	–	0
Georgia Normal		–		6	–	1	–	1
George Washington		–		7	–	2	–	0
Texas A&I		–		4	–	1	–	0
Middle Tennessee State Teachers		–		6	–	2	–	0
Loyola (LA)		–		6	–	2	–	2
Navy		–		6	–	3	–	0
Catholic University		–		5	–	3	–	0
West Tennessee State Teachers		–		5	–	3	–	1
Texas Tech		–		5	–	4	–	0
Davidson		–		4	–	4	–	1
Delaware State		–		1	–	1	–	0
Howard		–		3	–	3	–	2
Southwestern (TN)		–		5	–	5	–	1
Texas Mines		–		2	–	2	–	2
Mississippi State Teachers		–		3	–	4	–	1
Duke		–		4	–	5	–	0
Miami (FL)		–		3	–	6	–	1
Delaware		–		2	–	5	–	1
East Tennessee State Teachers		–		2	–	5	–	0
Oglethorpe		–		2	–	6	–	0
Wake Forest		–		2	–	6	–	2

The 1927 George Washington Hatchetites football team was an American football team that represented George Washington University as an independent during the 1927 college football season. In their fourth season under head coach Harry W. Crum, the team compiled a 7–2 record.

== Schedule ==
Date	Opponent	Site	Result	Attendance	Source
October 1	at CCNY	Lewisohn Stadium; New York, NY	W 19–6		
October 8	American	Tidal Basin Field; Washington, DC	W 28–0		
October 15	at Rutgers	Neilson Field; New Brunswick, NJ	W 6–0		
October 22	Fordham	Central High School Stadium; Washington, DC	W 13–0	6,000	
October 29	at Ursinus	Patterson Field; Collegeville, PA	W 7–0		
November 5	at Penn State	New Beaver Field; University Park, PA	L 0–13	3,500	
November 12	Saint Vincent	Central High School Stadium; Washington, DC	W 40–19		
November 19	at Concord State	Athens, WV	W 33–0	5,000	
November 24	at Catholic University	Brookland Stadium; Washington, DC	L 21–27	15,000	
