= 1927 Western Kentucky State Normal Hilltoppers football team =

American college football season

1927 Western Kentucky State Normal Hilltoppers football
- Conference: Southern Intercollegiate Athletic Association
- Record: 5–4 (2–4 SIAA)
- Head coach: Edgar Diddle (6th season)
- Captain: August Throgmorton

1927 Southern Intercollegiate Athletic Association football standings
	Conf.					Overall
Team	W		L		T	W		L		T
Mississippi College +	8	–	0	–	0	8	–	0	–	0
Chattanooga +	5	–	0	–	0	8	–	1	–	0
Centenary +	4	–	0	–	0	10	–	0	–	0
Furman +	3	–	0	–	0	10	–	1	–	0
Georgetown (KY)	1	–	0	–	0	1	–	0	–	1
Stetson	4	–	0	–	1	6	–	0	–	1
Loyola (LA)	1	–	0	–	1	6	–	2	–	2
Wofford	2	–	1	–	2	2	–	4	–	3
Presbyterian	2	–	2	–	1	3	–	3	–	3
Mercer	2	–	2	–	0	5	–	4	–	0
Louisville	2	–	2	–	0	4	–	4	–	0
Louisiana College	1	–	1	–	0	1	–	1	–	0
Union (TN)	2	–	3	–	0	6	–	4	–	0
The Citadel	2	–	3	–	1	3	–	6	–	1
Centre	2	–	3	–	0	3	–	6	–	0
Howard (AL)	1	–	2	–	1	7	–	2	–	2
Southern College	2	–	4	–	1	2	–	5	–	1
Birmingham–Southern	2	–	4	–	0	3	–	6	–	0
Western Kentucky State Normal	2	–	4	–	0	5	–	4	–	0
Erskine	1	–	2	–	1	2	–	4	–	1
Louisiana Tech	1	–	3	–	0	3	–	5	–	0
SW Louisiana	1	–	4	–	0	2	–	7	–	1
Millsaps	1	–	5	–	0	3	–	8	–	0
Rollins	0	–	2	–	0	1	–	5	–	0
Transylvania	0	–	5	–	0	0	–	9	–	0
Newberry	0	–	6	–	0	0	–	8	–	1
Kentucky Wesleyan	0	–	0	–	0	0	–	0	–	0
+ – Conference co-champions

The 1927 Western Kentucky State Normal Hilltoppers football team represented Western Kentucky State Normal School and Teachers College (now known as Western Kentucky University) as a member of the Southern Intercollegiate Athletic Association during the 1927 college football season. They were coached by Edgar Diddle in his sixth year.

== Schedule ==
Date	Opponent	Site	Result	Source
September 30	at Chattanooga	Chamberlain Field; Chattanooga, TN	L 6–44	
October 8	at Bethel (TN)	McKenzie, TN	W 61–0	
October 15	Transylvania	Bowling Green, KY	W 27–0	
October 22	at Georgetown (KY)	Georgetown, KY	L 0–6	
October 29	at Kentucky Wesleyan	Owensboro, KY	L 0–19	
November 5	Louisville^{†}	Bowling Green, KY	W 7–6	
November 11	Union (TN)	Bowling Green, KY	L 0–19	
November 19	at Evansville	Evansville, IN	W 27–0	
November 24	Eastern Kentucky	Bowling Green, KY (rivalry)	W 12–0	
^{†}Homecoming
