= 1927 West Tennessee State Teachers football team =

American college football season

1927 West Tennessee State Teachers football
- Conference: Independent
- Record: 5–3–1
- Head coach: Zach Curlin (4th season)
- Captain: Graham Crawford
- Home stadium: Memorial Field, Hodges Field

1927 Southern college football independents records
	Conf.			Overall
Team	W	L	T	W		L		T
Georgetown		–		8	–	1	–	0
Spring Hill		–		6	–	1	–	0
Wesley		–		6	–	1	–	0
Georgia Normal		–		6	–	1	–	1
George Washington		–		7	–	2	–	0
Texas A&I		–		4	–	1	–	0
Middle Tennessee State Teachers		–		6	–	2	–	0
Loyola (LA)		–		6	–	2	–	2
Navy		–		6	–	3	–	0
Catholic University		–		5	–	3	–	0
West Tennessee State Teachers		–		5	–	3	–	1
Texas Tech		–		5	–	4	–	0
Davidson		–		4	–	4	–	1
Delaware State		–		1	–	1	–	0
Howard		–		3	–	3	–	2
Southwestern (TN)		–		5	–	5	–	1
Texas Mines		–		2	–	2	–	2
Mississippi State Teachers		–		3	–	4	–	1
Duke		–		4	–	5	–	0
Miami (FL)		–		3	–	6	–	1
Delaware		–		2	–	5	–	1
East Tennessee State Teachers		–		2	–	5	–	0
Oglethorpe		–		2	–	6	–	0
Wake Forest		–		2	–	6	–	2

The 1927 West Tennessee State Teachers football team was an American football team that represented West Tennessee State Teachers College (now known as the University of Memphis) as an independent during the 1927 college football season. In their fourth season under head coach Zach Curlin, West Tennessee State Teachers compiled a 5–3–1 record.

== Schedule ==
Date	Time	Opponent	Site	Result	Attendance	Source
September 24	3:00 p.m.	Jonesboro College	Hodges Field; Memphis, TN	W 48–0		
October 1	2:15 p.m.	Will Mayfield	Memorial Field; Memphis, TN	W 7–0		
October 8	3:00 p.m.	Delta State	Memorial Field; Memphis, TN	W 21–0		
October 14		at Middle Tennessee State Teachers	Murfreesboro, TN	L 7–47		
October 22	2:15 p.m.	Bethel (TN)	Hodges Field; Memphis, TN	W 27–13		
October 29	2:30 p.m.	Lambuth	Memorial Field; Memphis, TN	W 20–7	1,000	
November 4		at Jonesboro A&M	Kays Field; Jonesboro, AR (rivalry)	L 6–9		
November 11	2:30 p.m.	at Southwestern (TN)	Fargason Field; Memphis, TN	L 6–26	4,000	
November 24		at Murray State	College Field; Murray, KY	T 14–14		
All times are in Central time
