= Whitey Rawl =

American football player and coach (1904–1980)

Biographical details
- Born: December 9, 1904; Lexington County, South Carolina
- Died: August 12, 1980 (aged 75); Orangeburg County, South Carolina

Playing career
- 1925–1927: Furman
- Position(s): Quarterback

Coaching career (HC unless noted)
- 1932–1933: South Carolina (assistant)

Accomplishments and honors

Championships
- SIAA (as player, 1927)

Awards
- Furman Athletics Hall of Fame

Fred Brooker "Whitey" Rawl (December 9, 1904 – August 12, 1980) was a college football player and coach. He also played basketball, baseball and track. He was a prominent quarterback for coach Billy Laval's Furman Purple Hurricane of Furman University, called the "siege gun" of the Furman backfield; leading Furman to a 23–5–1 record over his tenure. The 1927 team won the Southern Intercollegiate Athletic Association and was the only team to defeat NC State. In a defeat over The Citadel, Rawl ran 56 yards for the game's only touchdown. He also starred in a victory over Mercer. Rawl was later a backfield coach under Laval for the South Carolina Gamecocks.

Rawl told The Columbia Record in 1961 that opponents thought "Laval was either cheating or crazy... Nobody ever seemed to figure out which, but we beat 'em." Rawl was inducted into the Furman Athletics Hall of Fame in 1982.
