= 1927 Texas Tech Matadors football team =

American college football season

1927 Texas Tech Matadors football
- 1927 Texas Tech football team
- Conference: Independent
- Record: 5–4
- Head coach: Ewing Y. Freeland (3rd season)
- Offensive scheme: T formation
- Base defense: 7–2–2
- Captain: Bruce Reed
- Home stadium: Tech Field

1927 Southern college football independents records
	Conf.			Overall
Team	W	L	T	W		L		T
Georgetown		–		8	–	1	–	0
Spring Hill		–		6	–	1	–	0
Wesley		–		6	–	1	–	0
Georgia Normal		–		6	–	1	–	1
George Washington		–		7	–	2	–	0
Texas A&I		–		4	–	1	–	0
Middle Tennessee State Teachers		–		6	–	2	–	0
Loyola (LA)		–		6	–	2	–	2
Navy		–		6	–	3	–	0
Catholic University		–		5	–	3	–	0
West Tennessee State Teachers		–		5	–	3	–	1
Texas Tech		–		5	–	4	–	0
Davidson		–		4	–	4	–	1
Delaware State		–		1	–	1	–	0
Howard		–		3	–	3	–	2
Southwestern (TN)		–		5	–	5	–	1
Texas Mines		–		2	–	2	–	2
Mississippi State Teachers		–		3	–	4	–	1
Duke		–		4	–	5	–	0
Miami (FL)		–		3	–	6	–	1
Delaware		–		2	–	5	–	1
East Tennessee State Teachers		–		2	–	5	–	0
Oglethorpe		–		2	–	6	–	0
Wake Forest		–		2	–	6	–	2

The 1927 Texas Tech Matadors football team represented Texas Technological College—now known as Texas Tech University—as an independent during the 1927 college football season. In their third season under head coach Ewing Y. Freeland, the Matadors compiled a 5–4 record and outscored opponents by a combined total of 134 to 100. The team played its home games at Tech Field.

== Schedule ==
Date	Opponent	Site	Result	Attendance	Source
September 24	Panhandle A&M	Tech Field; Lubbock, TX	W 62–0		
October 1	St. Edward's	Tech Field; Lubbock, TX	W 13–6	3,000	
October 8	at TCU	Clark Field; Fort Worth, TX (rivalry)	L 6–16	4,000	
October 15	Simmons (TX)	Tech Field; Lubbock, TX	W 10–6	2,000	
October 22	Sul Ross	Tech Field; Lubbock, TX	W 6–0	2,000	
October 28	Texas A&M	Tech Field; Lubbock, TX (rivalry)	L 6–47		
November 5	Daniel Baker	Tech Field; Lubbock, TX	W 19–7	1,300	
November 11	at Abilene Christian	Fair Park; Abilene, TX	L 3–6		
November 24	West Texas State	Tech Field; Lubbock, TX	L 9–12	5,000	
