= 1927 Georgia Normal Blue Tide football team =

American college football season

1927 Georgia Normal Blue Tide football
- Conference: Independent
- Record: 6–1–1
- Head coach: Hugh A. Woodle (1st season)

1927 Southern college football independents records
	Conf.			Overall
Team	W	L	T	W		L		T
Georgetown		–		8	–	1	–	0
Spring Hill		–		6	–	1	–	0
Wesley		–		6	–	1	–	0
Georgia Normal		–		6	–	1	–	1
George Washington		–		7	–	2	–	0
Texas A&I		–		4	–	1	–	0
Middle Tennessee State Teachers		–		6	–	2	–	0
Loyola (LA)		–		6	–	2	–	2
Navy		–		6	–	3	–	0
Catholic University		–		5	–	3	–	0
West Tennessee State Teachers		–		5	–	3	–	1
Texas Tech		–		5	–	4	–	0
Davidson		–		4	–	4	–	1
Delaware State		–		1	–	1	–	0
Howard		–		3	–	3	–	2
Southwestern (TN)		–		5	–	5	–	1
Texas Mines		–		2	–	2	–	2
Mississippi State Teachers		–		3	–	4	–	1
Duke		–		4	–	5	–	0
Miami (FL)		–		3	–	6	–	1
Delaware		–		2	–	5	–	1
East Tennessee State Teachers		–		2	–	5	–	0
Oglethorpe		–		2	–	6	–	0
Wake Forest		–		2	–	6	–	2

The 1927 Georgia Normal Blue Tide football team represented Georgia Normal School—now known as Georgia Southern University–as an independent during the 1927 college football season. Led by first-year head coach Hugh A. Woodle, Georgia Normal compiled a record of 6–1–1.

== Schedule ==
Date	Opponent	Site	Result	Source
October 3	South Georgia State	Statesboro, GA	W 2–0	
October 15	South Georgia A&M	Statesboro, GA	W 6–0	
October 21	Benedictine College (GA)	Statesboro, GA	W 25–6	
	Fort Screven		W 6–0	
November 4	Academy of Richmond County	Statesboro, GA	L 0–16	
November 11	Brewton–Parker	Statesboro, GA	W 25–7	
November 19	at Piedmont	Waycross, GA	W 26–13	
November 24	Brewton–Parker	Mount Vernon, GA	T 0–0	
