= 1927 Mercer Bears football team =

American college football season

1927 Mercer Bears football
- Conference: Southern Intercollegiate Athletic Association
- Record: 5–4 (2–2 SIAA)
- Head coach: Bernie Moore (2nd season)
- Home stadium: Centennial Stadium

1927 Southern Intercollegiate Athletic Association football standings
	Conf.					Overall
Team	W		L		T	W		L		T
Mississippi College +	8	–	0	–	0	8	–	0	–	0
Chattanooga +	5	–	0	–	0	8	–	1	–	0
Centenary +	4	–	0	–	0	10	–	0	–	0
Furman +	3	–	0	–	0	10	–	1	–	0
Georgetown (KY)	1	–	0	–	0	1	–	0	–	1
Stetson	4	–	0	–	1	6	–	0	–	1
Loyola (LA)	1	–	0	–	1	6	–	2	–	2
Wofford	2	–	1	–	2	2	–	4	–	3
Presbyterian	2	–	2	–	1	3	–	3	–	3
Mercer	2	–	2	–	0	5	–	4	–	0
Louisville	2	–	2	–	0	4	–	4	–	0
Louisiana College	1	–	1	–	0	1	–	1	–	0
Union (TN)	2	–	3	–	0	6	–	4	–	0
The Citadel	2	–	3	–	1	3	–	6	–	1
Centre	2	–	3	–	0	3	–	6	–	0
Howard (AL)	1	–	2	–	1	7	–	2	–	2
Southern College	2	–	4	–	1	2	–	5	–	1
Birmingham–Southern	2	–	4	–	0	3	–	6	–	0
Western Kentucky State Normal	2	–	4	–	0	5	–	4	–	0
Erskine	1	–	2	–	1	2	–	4	–	1
Louisiana Tech	1	–	3	–	0	3	–	5	–	0
SW Louisiana	1	–	4	–	0	2	–	7	–	1
Millsaps	1	–	5	–	0	3	–	8	–	0
Rollins	0	–	2	–	0	1	–	5	–	0
Transylvania	0	–	5	–	0	0	–	9	–	0
Newberry	0	–	6	–	0	0	–	8	–	1
Kentucky Wesleyan	0	–	0	–	0	0	–	0	–	0
+ – Conference co-champions

The 1927 Mercer Bears football team was an American football team that represented Mercer University as a member of the Southern Intercollegiate Athletic Association (SIAA) during the 1927 college football season. In their second year under head coach Bernie Moore, the team compiled a 5–4 record.

== Schedule ==
Date	Opponent	Site	Result	Attendance	Source
September 24	North Georgia*	Centennial Stadium; Macon, GA	W 77–0		
October 1	vs. The Citadel	Municipal Stadium; Savannah, GA	W 6–0	5,000	
October 8	Furman	Centennial Stadium; Macon, GA	L 13–27		
October 15	Presbyterian	Centennial Stadium; Macon, GA	W 27–6		
October 22	Howard (AL)	Centennial Stadium; Macon, GA	L 0–14		
October 29	at Florida*	Fleming Field; Gainesville, FL	L 6–32	9,000	
November 11	Oglethorpe*	Centennial Stadium; Macon, GA	W 21–6	7,000	
November 19	at Georgia*	Sanford Field; Athens, GA	L 7–26		
November 24	vs. Wake Forest*	Memorial Stadium; Asheville, NC	W 34–0	4,000	
*Non-conference game
