= Joseph J. Rothrock =

American football coach (1898–1968)

Biographical details
- Born: August 2, 1898; New Castle, Delaware, U.S.
- Died: November 17, 1968 (aged 70); Silver Lake, New Hampshire, U.S.

Playing career

Football
- c. 1920: Delaware

Basketball
- c. 1920: Delaware

Baseball
- c. 1920: Delaware

Coaching career (HC unless noted)

Football
- 1922: Milford HS (DE)
- 1923: Perkiomen School (PA) (assistant)
- 1924–1926: Peekskill Military Academy (NY)
- 1927–1928: Delaware

Basketball
- 1924–1927: Peekskill Military Academy (NY)
- 1927–1930: Delaware

Baseball
- 1925–1927: Peekskill Military Academy (NY)
- 1928–1930: Delaware

Administrative career (AD unless noted)
- 1924–1927: Peekskill Military Academy (NY)
- 1927–1930: Delaware
- 1930–1949: Peekskill Military Academy (NY)

Head coaching record
- Overall: 4–11–1 (college football)

Joseph John Rothrock (August 2, 1898 – November 17, 1968) was an American football, basketball, and baseball coach and athletics administrator. He served as the head football coach at the University of Delaware from 1927 to 1928, compiling a record of 4–11–1 in two seasons.

Rothrock was born in New Castle, Delaware and graduated from New Castle High School in 1918. He attended the University of Delaware, lettering in football, basketball, and baseball before graduating in 1922.

Rothrock began his coaching career in 1922 at Milford High School in Milford, Delaware. The next year, he moved on to the Perkiomen School in Pennsburg, Pennsylvania, where he was an assistant football coach. From 1924 to 1927, he was the athletic director at Peekskill Military Academy in Peekskill, New York and coached football, basketball, and baseball.

Rothrock resigned from his position at Delaware in 1930 to return to Peekskill Military Academy as athletic director.

Rothrock purchased Camp Allego, a girls camp located in Silver Lake, New Hampshire, in 1940, and ran the camp until 1966. He moved permanently to Silver Lake in May 1968 and died of an apparent heart attack, on November 17, 1968, at his home there.

== Head coaching record ==
=== College football ===
Year	Team	Overall	Conference	Standing	Bowl/playoffs
Delaware Fightin' Blue Hens (Independent) (1927–1928)
1927	Delaware	2–5–1			
1928	Delaware	2–6			
Delaware:		4–11–1			
Total:		4–11–1			
