= 1927 Davidson Wildcats football team =

American college football season

1927 Davidson Wildcats football
- Conference: Independent
- Record: 4–4–1
- Head coach: William L. Younger (5th season)
- Home stadium: Richardson Field

1927 Southern college football independents records
	Conf.			Overall
Team	W	L	T	W		L		T
Georgetown		–		8	–	1	–	0
Spring Hill		–		6	–	1	–	0
Wesley		–		6	–	1	–	0
Georgia Normal		–		6	–	1	–	1
George Washington		–		7	–	2	–	0
Texas A&I		–		4	–	1	–	0
Middle Tennessee State Teachers		–		6	–	2	–	0
Loyola (LA)		–		6	–	2	–	2
Navy		–		6	–	3	–	0
Catholic University		–		5	–	3	–	0
West Tennessee State Teachers		–		5	–	3	–	1
Texas Tech		–		5	–	4	–	0
Davidson		–		4	–	4	–	1
Delaware State		–		1	–	1	–	0
Howard		–		3	–	3	–	2
Southwestern (TN)		–		5	–	5	–	1
Texas Mines		–		2	–	2	–	2
Mississippi State Teachers		–		3	–	4	–	1
Duke		–		4	–	5	–	0
Miami (FL)		–		3	–	6	–	1
Delaware		–		2	–	5	–	1
East Tennessee State Teachers		–		2	–	5	–	0
Oglethorpe		–		2	–	6	–	0
Wake Forest		–		2	–	6	–	2

The 1927 Davidson Wildcats football team was an American football team that represented Davidson College as an independent during the 1927 college football season. In their fifth year under head coach William L. Younger, the team compiled a 4–4–1 record.

== Schedule ==
Date	Opponent	Site	Result	Attendance	Source
September 24	vs. The Citadel	Gastonia H.S. Stadium; Gastonia, NC	W 5–0		
October 1	at Florida	Fleming Field; Gainesville, FL	W 12–0	7,000	
October 8	at Wofford	Spartanburg, SC	W 12–2		
October 15	Elon	Richardson Field; Davidson, NC	W 27–0		
October 22	vs. Wake Forest	World War Memorial Stadium; Greensboro, NC	T 13–13	8,000	
October 29	VMI	Richardson Field; Davidson, NC	L 0–20		
November 5	vs. NC State	World War Memorial Stadium; Greensboro, NC	L 6–25		
November 12	at North Carolina	Kenan Memorial Stadium; Chapel Hill, NC	L 0–27	9,000	
November 24	Duke	Richardson Field; Davidson, NC	L 7–48		
