= Tom King (American football) =

American sports coach (1895–1972)

Biographical details
- Born: October 7, 1895; Boone County, Indiana, U.S.
- Died: January 4, 1972 (aged 76); Jasper, Indiana, U.S.

Playing career

Football
- 1915–1917: Notre Dame

Basketball
- 1914–1916: Notre Dame

Coaching career (HC unless noted)

Football
- 1922–1923: St. Xavier HS (KY)
- 1924: Louisville Male HS (KY)
- 1925–1930: Louisville

Basketball
- 1925–1930: Louisville

Baseball
- 1926–1929: Louisville

Administrative career (AD unless noted)
- 1925–1931: Louisville

Head coaching record
- Overall: 27–21 (college football); 38–27 (college basketball); 30–10–1 (college baseball)

Tom King (October 7, 1895 – January 4, 1972) was an American football, basketball, and baseball coach. He served as the head football coach at the University of Louisville from 1925 to 1930, compiling a record of 27–21.

King died in Jasper, Indiana on January 4, 1972, at the age of 76.

== Head coaching record ==
=== College football ===
Year	Team	Overall	Conference	Standing	Bowl/playoffs
Louisville Cardinals (Southern Intercollegiate Athletic Association) (1925–1930)
1925	Louisville	8–0			
1926	Louisville	6–2	2–1	T–11th	
1927	Louisville	4–4	2–2	T–9th	
1928	Louisville	1–7	0–4	29th	
1929	Louisville	3–5	1–3	T–22nd	
1930	Louisville	5–3	2–2	T–13th	
Louisville:		27–21			
Total:		27–21			
