= 1927 East Tennessee State Teachers football team =

American college football season

1927 East Tennessee State Teachers football
- Conference: Independent
- Record: 2–5
- Head coach: John Robinson (3rd season)
- Captain: Jack "Casey" Painter

1927 Southern college football independents records
	Conf.			Overall
Team	W	L	T	W		L		T
Georgetown		–		8	–	1	–	0
Spring Hill		–		6	–	1	–	0
Wesley		–		6	–	1	–	0
Georgia Normal		–		6	–	1	–	1
George Washington		–		7	–	2	–	0
Texas A&I		–		4	–	1	–	0
Middle Tennessee State Teachers		–		6	–	2	–	0
Loyola (LA)		–		6	–	2	–	2
Navy		–		6	–	3	–	0
Catholic University		–		5	–	3	–	0
West Tennessee State Teachers		–		5	–	3	–	1
Texas Tech		–		5	–	4	–	0
Davidson		–		4	–	4	–	1
Delaware State		–		1	–	1	–	0
Howard		–		3	–	3	–	2
Southwestern (TN)		–		5	–	5	–	1
Texas Mines		–		2	–	2	–	2
Mississippi State Teachers		–		3	–	4	–	1
Duke		–		4	–	5	–	0
Miami (FL)		–		3	–	6	–	1
Delaware		–		2	–	5	–	1
East Tennessee State Teachers		–		2	–	5	–	0
Oglethorpe		–		2	–	6	–	0
Wake Forest		–		2	–	6	–	2

The 1927 East Tennessee State Teachers football team was an American football team that represented East Tennessee State Teacher's College—now known as East Tennessee State University (ETSU)—as an independent in the 1927 college football season. They were led by third-year coach John Robinson. Robinson was assisted by William "Willie" Flinn Rogers, who taught history and government at the school from 1925 to 1968. According to Old Hickory, the 1927 season presented Robinson with a similar task to previous years, which was to develop a team out of "green material". The team finished with a 2–5 record, which included wins in their last two games over Hiwassee and Bluefield. Of their losses, they were blanked in all except against Concord, where they scored six points.

== Schedule ==
Date	Time	Opponent	Site	Result	Source
October 1		at Concord	Bluefield, WV	L 6–30	
October 15		Emory and Henry	Johnson City, TN	L 0–21	
October 22		at Eastern Kentucky	Richmond, KY	L 0–31	
October 29		Mars Hill	Johnson City, TN	L 0–18	
November 5	3:00 p.m.	Carson–Newman	Johnson City, TN	L 0–15	
November 19		at Hiwassee	Madisonville, TN	W 20–0	
November 26		Bluefield	Johnson City, TN	W 14–6	
All times are in Eastern time
