= 1927 Mississippi College Choctaws football team =

American college football season

1927 Mississippi College Choctaws football

SIAA co-champion
- Conference: Southern Intercollegiate Athletic Association
- Record: 8–0 (8–0 SIAA)
- Head coach: George Bohler (5th season)
- Home stadium: Provine Field

1927 Southern Intercollegiate Athletic Association football standings
	Conf.					Overall
Team	W		L		T	W		L		T
Mississippi College +	8	–	0	–	0	8	–	0	–	0
Chattanooga +	5	–	0	–	0	8	–	1	–	0
Centenary +	4	–	0	–	0	10	–	0	–	0
Furman +	3	–	0	–	0	10	–	1	–	0
Georgetown (KY)	1	–	0	–	0	1	–	0	–	1
Stetson	4	–	0	–	1	6	–	0	–	1
Loyola (LA)	1	–	0	–	1	6	–	2	–	2
Wofford	2	–	1	–	2	2	–	4	–	3
Presbyterian	2	–	2	–	1	3	–	3	–	3
Mercer	2	–	2	–	0	5	–	4	–	0
Louisville	2	–	2	–	0	4	–	4	–	0
Louisiana College	1	–	1	–	0	1	–	1	–	0
Union (TN)	2	–	3	–	0	6	–	4	–	0
The Citadel	2	–	3	–	1	3	–	6	–	1
Centre	2	–	3	–	0	3	–	6	–	0
Howard (AL)	1	–	2	–	1	7	–	2	–	2
Southern College	2	–	4	–	1	2	–	5	–	1
Birmingham–Southern	2	–	4	–	0	3	–	6	–	0
Western Kentucky State Normal	2	–	4	–	0	5	–	4	–	0
Erskine	1	–	2	–	1	2	–	4	–	1
Louisiana Tech	1	–	3	–	0	3	–	5	–	0
SW Louisiana	1	–	4	–	0	2	–	7	–	1
Millsaps	1	–	5	–	0	3	–	8	–	0
Rollins	0	–	2	–	0	1	–	5	–	0
Transylvania	0	–	5	–	0	0	–	9	–	0
Newberry	0	–	6	–	0	0	–	8	–	1
Kentucky Wesleyan	0	–	0	–	0	0	–	0	–	0
+ – Conference co-champions

The 1927 Mississippi College Choctaws football team was an American football team that represented Mississippi College in the Southern Intercollegiate Athletic Association during the 1927 college football season. In their fifth year under head coach George Bohler, the team compiled an 8–0 record and finished as SIAA co-champion.

== Schedule ==
Date	Opponent	Site	Result	Source
October 1	Union (TN)	Provine Field; Clinton, MS	W 19–0	
October 15	at Louisiana College	Alumni Field; Pineville, LA	W 30–0	
October 21	vs. Millsaps	Fairgrounds; Jackson, MS	W 12–0	
October 29	vs. Louisiana Tech	Forsythe Park; Monroe, LA	W 7–0	
November 5	Howard (AL)	Provine Field; Clinton, MS	W 13–0	
November 11	at Birmingham–Southern	Rickwood Field; Birmingham, AL	W 33–19	
November 18	Southwestern Louisiana	Provine Field; Clinton, MS	W 27–0	
November 24	at Southern College	Southern Field; Lakeland, FL	W 12–0	
