= 1927 Millsaps Majors football team =

American college football season

1927 Millsaps Majors football
- Conference: Southern Intercollegiate Athletic Association
- Record: 3–8 (1–5 SIAA)
- Head coach: Herman F. Zimoski (6th season)

1927 Southern Intercollegiate Athletic Association football standings
	Conf.					Overall
Team	W		L		T	W		L		T
Mississippi College +	8	–	0	–	0	8	–	0	–	0
Chattanooga +	5	–	0	–	0	8	–	1	–	0
Centenary +	4	–	0	–	0	10	–	0	–	0
Furman +	3	–	0	–	0	10	–	1	–	0
Georgetown (KY)	1	–	0	–	0	1	–	0	–	1
Stetson	4	–	0	–	1	6	–	0	–	1
Loyola (LA)	1	–	0	–	1	6	–	2	–	2
Wofford	2	–	1	–	2	2	–	4	–	3
Presbyterian	2	–	2	–	1	3	–	3	–	3
Mercer	2	–	2	–	0	5	–	4	–	0
Louisville	2	–	2	–	0	4	–	4	–	0
Louisiana College	1	–	1	–	0	1	–	1	–	0
Union (TN)	2	–	3	–	0	6	–	4	–	0
The Citadel	2	–	3	–	1	3	–	6	–	1
Centre	2	–	3	–	0	3	–	6	–	0
Howard (AL)	1	–	2	–	1	7	–	2	–	2
Southern College	2	–	4	–	1	2	–	5	–	1
Birmingham–Southern	2	–	4	–	0	3	–	6	–	0
Western Kentucky State Normal	2	–	4	–	0	5	–	4	–	0
Erskine	1	–	2	–	1	2	–	4	–	1
Louisiana Tech	1	–	3	–	0	3	–	5	–	0
SW Louisiana	1	–	4	–	0	2	–	7	–	1
Millsaps	1	–	5	–	0	3	–	8	–	0
Rollins	0	–	2	–	0	1	–	5	–	0
Transylvania	0	–	5	–	0	0	–	9	–	0
Newberry	0	–	6	–	0	0	–	8	–	1
Kentucky Wesleyan	0	–	0	–	0	0	–	0	–	0
+ – Conference co-champions

The 1927 Millsaps Majors football team was an American football team that represented Millsaps College as a member of the Southern Intercollegiate Athletic Association (SIAA) during the 1927 college football season. In their sixth year under head coach Herman F. Zimoski, the team compiled a 3–8 record.

== Schedule ==
Date	Opponent	Site	Result	Source
September 24	at Alabama*	Denny Field; Tuscaloosa, AL	L 0–46	
October 1	at Centenary	Shreveport, LA	L 0–26	
October 8	Howard (AL)	Jackson, MS	W 13–6	
October 15	Clarke (MS)*	Jackson, MS	W 33–0	
October 21	vs. Mississippi College	Fairgrounds; Jackson, MS (rivalry)	L 0–12	
October 28	at Union (TN)	Jackson, TN	L 0–6	
November 4	Birmingham–Southern	Jackson, MS	L 0–13	
November 11	at Southwestern Louisiana	Campus Athletic Field; Lafayette, LA	L 6–12	
November 18	at Mississippi A&M*	Scott Field; Starkville, MS	L 0–6	
November 24	Southwestern (TN)*	Jackson, MS	L 6–19	
December 17	at Miami (FL)*	University Stadium; Coral Gables, FL	W 31–0	
*Non-conference game
