= 1927 Spring Hill Badgers football team =

American college football season

1927 Spring Hill Badgers football
- Conference: Independent
- Record: 6–1
- Head coach: William T. Daly (3rd season)

1927 Southern college football independents records
	Conf.			Overall
Team	W	L	T	W		L		T
Georgetown		–		8	–	1	–	0
Spring Hill		–		6	–	1	–	0
Wesley		–		6	–	1	–	0
Georgia Normal		–		6	–	1	–	1
George Washington		–		7	–	2	–	0
Texas A&I		–		4	–	1	–	0
Middle Tennessee State Teachers		–		6	–	2	–	0
Loyola (LA)		–		6	–	2	–	2
Navy		–		6	–	3	–	0
Catholic University		–		5	–	3	–	0
West Tennessee State Teachers		–		5	–	3	–	1
Texas Tech		–		5	–	4	–	0
Davidson		–		4	–	4	–	1
Delaware State		–		1	–	1	–	0
Howard		–		3	–	3	–	2
Southwestern (TN)		–		5	–	5	–	1
Texas Mines		–		2	–	2	–	2
Mississippi State Teachers		–		3	–	4	–	1
Duke		–		4	–	5	–	0
Miami (FL)		–		3	–	6	–	1
Delaware		–		2	–	5	–	1
East Tennessee State Teachers		–		2	–	5	–	0
Oglethorpe		–		2	–	6	–	0
Wake Forest		–		2	–	6	–	2

The 1927 Spring Hill Badgers football team was an American football team that represented Spring Hill College, a Jesuit college in Mobile, Alabama, during the 1927 college football season. In its third season under head coach William T. Daly, the team compiled a 6–1 record.

== Schedule ==
Date	Opponent	Site	Result	Source
September 24	Howard (AL)	Hartwell Field; Mobile, AL	L 0–37	
October 8	at Southwestern Louisiana	Campus Athletic Field; Lafayette, LA	W 19–0	
October 14	Rollins	Hartwell Field; Mobile, AL	W 18–0	
October 29	Marion	Hartwell Field; Mobile, AL	W 7–6	
November 5	Mississippi State Teachers	Hartwell Field; Mobile, AL	W 37–0	
November 11	at Miami (FL)	University Stadium; Coral Gables, FL	W 6–0	
November 24	Union (TN)	Hartwell Field; Mobile, AL	W 6–0	
