= 1927 Simmons Cowboys football team =

American college football season

1927 Simmons Cowboys football
- Conference: Texas Conference
- Record: 5–3–2 (2–1–2 Texas)
- Head coach: Frank Bridges (1st season)
- Home stadium: Parramore Field

1927 Texas Conference football standings
	Conf.					Overall
Team	W		L		T	W		L		T
Southwestern (TX) $	2	–	1	–	1	4	–	2	–	1
Simmons (TX)	2	–	1	–	2	5	–	3	–	2
Howard Payne	3	–	2	–	0	6	–	3	–	0
St. Edward's	1	–	1	–	1	3	–	3	–	3
Trinity (TX)	1	–	2	–	1	3	–	5	–	1
Austin	0	–	2	–	1	1	–	5	–	1
$ – Conference champion

The 1927 Simmons Cowboys football team represented Simmons University—now known as Hardin–Simmons University—as a member of the Texas Conference during 1927 college football season. Led by Frank Bridges in his first season as head coach, the team went 5–3–2 overall, placing second in the Texas Conference with a mark of 2–1–2.

== Schedule ==
Date	Opponent	Site	Result	Attendance	Source
September 24	St. Edward's	Parramore Field; Abilene, TX	T 0–0		
October 1	North Texas State Teachers*	West Texas Fairgrounds; Abilene, TX	W 14–0		
October 7	Southwestern (TX)	Parramore Field; Abilene, TX	T 6–6		
October 15	at Texas Tech*	Tech Field; Lubbock, TX	L 6–10	2,000	
October 22	West Texas State*	Parramore Field; Abilene, TX	W 7–0		
October 28	at Daniel Baker*	Brownwood, TX	L 7–20		
November 4	at Austin	Sherman, TX	W 20–6		
November 11	at Trinity (TX)	Yoakum Field; Waxahachie, TX	L 6–14		
November 18	at Texas Mines*	El Paso High School Stadium; El Paso, TX	W 34–19		
November 24	Howard Payne	Parramore Field; Abilene, TX	W 3–0		
*Non-conference game
