= Ken Shroyer =

American football coach

Biographical details
- Born: February 1, 1898; Buckhannon, West Virginia, U.S.
- Died: July 6, 1974 (aged 76); Beckley, West Virginia, U.S.

Coaching career (HC unless noted)

Football
- 1922–1925: Western Maryland
- 1926–1927: Franklin & Marshall
- 1928–1932: New River State

Football
- 1922–1923: Western Maryland
- 1926–1928: Franklin & Marshall
- 1928–1933: New River State

Head coaching record
- Overall: 46–38–11 (college football)

Accomplishments and honors

Championships
- Football; 1 WVAC (1929)

David Kenneth Shroyer (February 1, 1898 – July 6, 1974) was an American college football and college basketball coach. He served as the head football coach at Western Maryland College (now known as McDaniel College) from 1922 to 1925, at Franklin & Marshall College from 1926 to 1927, and at New River State College (now known as West Virginia University Institute of Technology) from 1928 to 1932.

== Coaching career ==
=== Franklin & Marshall ===
Schroyer was the head football coach at Franklin & Marshall College in Lancaster, Pennsylvania. He held that position for the 1926 and 1927 seasons. His coaching record at Franklin & Marshall was 1–15–2.

=== New River State ===
Shroyer was the head football coach at New River State College—now known as West Virginia University Institute of Technology—in Montgomery, West Virginia for five season, from 1928 to 1932, compiling a record of 24–9–5.

== Later life ==
Schroyer later became the president of Beckley College at Beckley, West Virginia. He retired from the school in 1967. He died there in 1974 after a short illness.

== Head coaching record ==
=== Football ===
Year	Team	Overall	Conference	Standing	Bowl/playoffs
Western Maryland Green Terror (Independent) (1922–1925)
1922	Western Maryland	3–6–2			
1923	Western Maryland	6–3–1			
1924	Western Maryland	5–3–1			
1925	Western Maryland	7–2			
Western Maryland:		21–14–4			
Franklin & Marshall (Eastern Pennsylvania Collegiate Conference / Central Pennsylvania Conference) (1926–1927)
1926	Franklin & Marshall	0–8–1	0–3–1	5th	
1927	Franklin & Marshall	1–7–1	1–2	4th	
Franklin & Marshall:		1–15–2	1–5–1		
New River State Golden Bears (West Virginia Athletic Conference) (1928–1933)
1928	New River State	5–1–1	5–1–1	3rd	
1929	New River State	6–1–1	5–0	1st	
1930	New River State	5–2–1	3–1–1	5th	
1931	New River State	5–2–1	1–0	NA	
1932	New River State	3–3–1	1–1	NA	
New River State:		24–9–5	15–2–3		
Total:		46–38–11			
National championship Conference title Conference division title or championship game berth
