= Dizzy McLeod =

American athletics coach (1900–1991)

Biographical details
- Born: November 23, 1900; Kendrick, Florida, U.S.
- Died: July 19, 1991 (aged 90); Marion County, Florida, U.S.

Playing career

Football
- 1919–1922: Furman

Baseball
- 1919–1922: Furman
- Positions: Back (football); Pitcher (baseball)

Coaching career (HC unless noted)

Football
- 1927: Clemson (assistant)
- 1932–1942: Furman

Basketball
- 1929–1933: Furman

Baseball
- 1928–1930: Furman
- 1933–1935: Furman
- 1937–1942: Furman

Administrative career (AD unless noted)
- 1932–1945: Furman

Head coaching record
- Overall: 56–37–7 (football); 69–18 (basketball); 78–81–5 (basketball)

Accomplishments and honors

Championships
- Football; 1 SIAA (1934)

Archie Paul "Dizzy" McLeod (1900 – 1991) was an American college sports coach. He served as the head football coach (1932–1942), basketball coach (1929–1933), baseball coach (1928–1930, 1933–1935, 1937–1942), and athletic director (1932–1945) at Furman University.

McLeod was an assistant football coach at Clemson University in 1927.

== Head coaching record ==
=== Football ===
| Year | Team | Overall | Conference | Standing | Bowl/playoffs |
|---|---|---|---|---|---|
Furman Purple Hurricane (Southern Intercollegiate Athletic Association) (1932–1935)
| 1932 | Furman | 8–1 | 5–0 | 2nd | |
| 1933 | Furman | 6–1–2 | 4–0–1 | 4th | |
| 1934 | Furman | 5–4 | 4–0 | 1st | |
| 1935 | Furman | 8–1 | 4–0 | 3rd | |
Furman Purple Hurricane (Southern Conference) (1936–1942)
| 1936 | Furman | 7–2 | 4–1 | 3rd | |
| 1937 | Furman | 4–3–2 | 1–2–2 | T–8th | |
| 1938 | Furman | 2–7–1 | 0–4–1 | 14th | |
| 1939 | Furman | 5–4 | 3–3 | T–8th | |
| 1940 | Furman | 5–4 | 4–3 | 8th | |
| 1941 | Furman | 3–4–2 | 2–3–2 | 9th | |
| 1942 | Furman | 3–6 | 3–3 | T–7th | |
| Furman: | | 56–37–7 | 34–19–6 | | |
| Total: | | 56–37–7 | | | |
National championship Conference title Conference division title or championship game berth
