= Billy Laval =

US sportsman (1885–1957)

Biographical details
- Born: January 15, 1885; Columbia, South Carolina, U.S.
- Died: January 20, 1957 (aged 72); Columbia, South Carolina, U.S.

Playing career

Baseball
- 1904–1905: Furman
- 1907: Greenville Mountaineers
- 1908–1909: Greenville Spinners
- 1909–1910: Winston-Salem Twins
- 1911–1912: Spartanburg Spartans
- 1912: Anderson Electricians
- 1913: Richmond Colts
- 1914: Petersburg Goobers
- 1915: Jacksonville Tarpons
- 1916: Greensboro Patriots
- 1919: Greenville Spinners
- Position: Pitcher

Coaching career (HC unless noted)

Football
- 1914: Furman (B squad)
- 1915: Furman (assistant)
- 1915–1927: Furman
- 1928–1934: South Carolina
- 1936–1937: Emory and Henry
- 1938–1949: Newberry

Basketball
- 1919–1927: Furman
- 1932–1933: South Carolina
- 1936–1937: Emory and Henry
- 1938–1950: Newberry

Baseball
- 1903: Erskine
- 1904: Sewanee
- 1905: Erskine
- 1908: Furman
- 1912–1927: Furman
- 1920: Greenville Spinners (manager)
- 1928–1934: South Carolina
- 1934: Asheville Tourists (manager)
- 1936–1937: Emory and Henry
- 1938–1950: Newberry

Administrative career (AD unless noted)
- 1920–1928: Furman
- 1928–1934: South Carolina
- 1936–1938: Emory and Henry
- 1938–1950: Newberry

Head coaching record
- Overall: 168–136–17 (football)

Accomplishments and honors

Championships
- Football; 3 SIAA (1922, 1923, 1927); 1 South Carolina Little Four (1947) Basketball; 1 SoCon Tournament (1933)

William Lawrence Laval (January 15, 1885 – January 20, 1957) was an American minor league baseball player, baseball manager, and college baseball, football, and basketball coach. He held head coaching positions at the University of South Carolina, Furman University, Emory and Henry College, and Newberry College. He is the only South Carolina football coach to have produced seven consecutive winning seasons. In 2009, The State called him "the greatest collegiate coach" in the history of South Carolina.

== Early life ==
Laval was born on January 15, 1885, in Columbia, South Carolina. At the age of 18, he coached baseball at Erskine College. The following year, he held the same position at Sewanee before returning to Erskine. From 1904 to 1905, he played baseball as a pitcher for Furman University. According to The State, there is no record of his enrollment at the school, however, which presumably made him a ringer. During the 1905 season, he proposed to his girlfriend Elizabeth, who responded "If you beat Clemson today, I will marry you." Laval pitched Furman to a win, 2–1, and the two were married soon after. He would later joke in speeches, "She has hated Clemson ever since."

== Minor league career ==
In his early years, Laval played minor league baseball for a wide number of teams throughout the South in the South Carolina League, Carolina Association, Virginia League, South Atlantic League, and North Carolina State League. These teams included: the Greenville Mountaineers (1907), Greenville Spinners (1908–1909 and 1919), Winston-Salem Twins (1909–1910), Spartanburg Spartans (1911–1912), Anderson Electricians (1912), Richmond Colts (1913), Petersburg Goobers (1914), Jacksonville Tarpons (1915), and the Greensboro Patriots (1916). His playing career was mediocre, with a .253 batting average and a 42–37 record as a pitcher.

In 1907, the manager of the Greenville Mountaineers, Tommy Stouch, signed Shoeless Joe Jackson, and to evaluate him, had Laval pitch against Jackson for five days of batting practice. He chose Laval for his assorted repertoire of curveballs and spitballs.

== Coaching career ==
Laval was described as an innovative football coach, and he implemented the "crazy quilt" offense, where pre-snap motion was used to create confusion for the defense. Whitey Rawl, Furman quarterback from 1925 to 1927, told The Columbia Record in 1961 that opponents thought "Laval was either cheating or crazy... Nobody ever seemed to figure out which, but we beat 'em." Laval also employed a play called the "crap shooters shift", which was similar to the modern no-huddle offense. He also constantly tweaked his teams' uniforms. At Newberry College, he modified the uniforms with targets to aid his color-blind quarterback's ability to distinguish his receivers. Laval's superstitious nature also influenced his uniform tinkering. For example, in the 1931 South Carolina–Clemson game, he had his team change from their gray jerseys into their "lucky" red uniforms at halftime.

Around 1912, Laval was invited by Clemson coach Frank Dobson to watch their football game against Georgia Tech. The event piqued Laval's interest in the sport, and he began studying it in earnest.

Despite never having played a single down of football, in 1914, he became the coach of the Furman B squad under head coach W. B. Bible, brother of Dana X. Bible. Bible, however, was an English professor with little knowledge of the game, and Laval soon had the B squad capable of decisively beating the varsity team in scrimmages. After the season, the school sent Laval to be mentored by Illinois head coach and football innovator Robert Zuppke, who had won the 1914 national championship. In mid-November 1915, Bible resigned as head football coach, before the team's final game of the season, and Laval was elected to succeed Bible. As an "all-year coach", his salary was $1,100, which was about the average at the time. He coached Furman football from 1916 to 1927 and compiled a 71–34–3 record. In 1920, Laval returned to the Greenville Spinners to serve as their manager during the baseball season.

In 1927, Laval accepted a three-year contract worth $8,000 per year to coach at the University of South Carolina, which made him the highest-paid coach in the state. He coached South Carolina from 1928 to 1934 and compiled a 10–14–4 record. Opposing coaches began demanding rule changes to limit the pre-snap shifts and motion of the "crazy quilt". Rules began to change toward the end of his tenure.

In 1932, Laval recruited four players from the 1930 Texas state high school basketball champions. South Carolina basketball coach Rock Norman did not want to play the new recruits ahead of his more seasoned players, so Laval agreed to coach the team for the season. Because of his lack of basketball knowledge, Laval had one of Norman's players, team captain Buck Smith act as an assistant coach. South Carolina ended the season on a fifteen-game winning streak and captured the Southern Conference tournament championship. Jeff Sagarin retroactively ranked South Carolina that season's third-best team in the nation. Norman returned to take over the basketball team the following year.

In 1933, the South Carolina athletic department reported a $15,200 deficit, and Laval reluctantly agreed to take a pay cut to $5,000. However, the department's financial difficulties worsened, and the next year it requested Laval take a second pay cut to $3,600, which he refused. The school allowed his contract to lapse after the 1934 season.

Laval then moved on to Emory and Henry College to serve as its head football, basketball, and baseball coach from 1936 to 1937. In 1938, he returned to his home state to coach at Newberry College. He remained there until retirement in 1950. In 12 seasons as head football coach at Newberry, Laval compiled a record of 45–61–5.

== Later life ==
After coaching, Laval ran a chain of sporting goods stores throughout South Carolina. He also worked in the front office of minor league baseball teams in Rock Hill and Greenwood. He and his wife had three children: two sons and a daughter. His wife died on November 22, 1956, after a long illness. Laval himself died shortly thereafter on January 20, 1957, from a heart attack at his son's home in Columbia. The South Carolina Athletic Hall of Fame inducted him in 1961, and the Furman University Athletic Hall of Fame inducted him in 1981. Coach Laval was inducted into the University of South Carolina Hall of Fame in 2016.

== Head coaching record ==
"Laval earned the right to be called the greatest collegiate coach in South Carolina athletics history. Mind you, we're not talking just about USC history. We're talking about the entire state to include all the best coaches over the years at any level, from Erskine to Clemson, from Charleston Southern to College of Charleston."

— Ron Morris, The State, November 2009

=== Football ===
Year	Team	Overall	Conference	Standing	Bowl/playoffs
Furman Baptists / Purple Hurricane (Southern Intercollegiate Athletic Association) (1915–1926)
1915	Furman	1–0 (Note: W. B. Bible helmed the team for its first seven games in 1915, before resigning in mid-November. Laval succeeded him and led the team for the final game of the season. Furman finish the year with an overall record of 5–3 and a mark of 1–1 in conference play.)	1–0	T–10th	
1916	Furman	4–5	1–4	T–17th	
1917	Furman	3–5	1–3	T–13th	
1918	Furman	3–5–1	1–3	8th	
1919	Furman	6–2–1	2–1–1	9th	
1920	Furman	9–1	4–1	T–5th	
1921	Furman	7–2–1	4–2–1	9th	
1922	Furman	8–3	3–0	1st	
1923	Furman	10–1	5–0	1st	
1924	Furman	5–5	1–2	12th	
1925	Furman	7–3	3–1	T–5th	
1926	Furman	8–1–1	3–1–1	T–4th	
1927	Furman	10–1	3–0	T–1st	
Furman:		80–35–4			
South Carolina Gamecocks (Southern Conference) (1928–1934)
1928	South Carolina	6–2–2	2–2–1	T–10th	
1929	South Carolina	6–5	2–5	15th	
1930	South Carolina	6–4	4–3	T–11th	
1931	South Carolina	5–4–2	3–3–1	T–8th	
1932	South Carolina	5–4–2	2–2–2	T–10th	
1933	South Carolina	6–3–1	3–0	2nd	
1934	South Carolina	5–4	2–3	7th	
South Carolina:		39–26–7	18–18–4		
Emory and Henry Wasps () (1936–1937)
1936	Emory and Henry	1–7–1			
1937	Emory and Henry	3–7			
Emory and Henry:		4–14–1			
Newberry Indians (Southern Intercollegiate Athletic Association) (1938–1941)
1938	Newberry	5–5	4–2	T–13th	
1939	Newberry	4–1–4	3–1–1	T–10th	
1940	Newberry	7–2–1	4–0	2nd	
1941	Newberry	5–6	2–3	T–19th	
Newberry Indians (Independent) (1942–1945)
1942	Newberry	4–5			
1943	Newberry	2–5			
1944	Newberry	0–7			
1945	Newberry	6–1			
Newberry Indians (South Carolina Little Four) (1946–1949)
1946	Newberry	4–7	2–1		
1947	Newberry	3–7	2–1	T–1st	
1948	Newberry	2–7	1–2		
1949	Newberry	3–8	1–2		
Newberry:		45–61–5	19–12–1		
Total:		168–136–17			
National championship Conference title Conference division title or championship game berth
