= W. B. Bible =

American football coach

Biographical details
- Born: 1890
- Died: June 11, 1967 (aged 76); Johnson City, Tennessee, U.S.
- Education: Carson–Newman (BA, 1911)

Coaching career (HC unless noted)

Football

Basketball
- 1914–1915: Furman
- 1914–1915: Furman

Administrative career (AD unless noted)
- 1912–1913: Savannah Institute (TN)
- 1913–1914: Allen Academy (TX)
- 1914–1916: Furman

Head coaching record
- Overall: 6–8 (football)

Willis Beeler Bible Sr. (1890 — June 11, 1967) was an American football coach, basketball coach, athletic director, and professor. He served as the head football coach at Furman University from 1914 to 1915. Bible resigned as Furman's head football coach in mid-November 1915 and was succeeded by assistant coach Billy Laval for the final game of the season. Bible was a professor of English at East Tennessee State University for 40 years before retiring in 1961.

Bible earned a Bachelor of Arts degree in 1911 and a Master of Arts degree in 1916, both from Carson–Newman University. He was the brother of College Football Hall of Fame coach Dana X. Bible. Bible died at the age of 76, on June 11, 1967, at Memorial Hospital in Johnson City, Tennessee.

== Head coaching record ==
=== Football ===
Year	Team	Overall	Conference	Standing	Bowl/playoffs
Furman Baptists (Independent) (1914)
1914	Furman	2–5			
Furman Baptists (Southern Intercollegiate Athletic Association) (1915)
1915	Furman	4–3 (Note: Bible resigned in mid-November, before the team's final game, and was succeeded as head coach by Billy Laval. Furman finish the year with an overall record of 5–3 and a mark of 1–1 in conference play, tying for 10th place in the SIAA.)	0–1		
Furman:		6–8	0–1		
Total:		6–8			
