= 1927 Loyola Wolf Pack football team =

American college football season

1927 Loyola Wolf Pack football
- Conference: Southern Intercollegiate Athletic Association
- Record: 6–2–2 (1–0–1 SIAA)
- Head coach: Clark Shaughnessy (1st season)
- Home stadium: Loyola Stadium

1927 Southern Intercollegiate Athletic Association football standings
| | Conf. | | | | | Overall |
| Team | W | | L | | T | W | | L | | T |
|---|---|---|---|---|---|---|---|---|---|---|
| Mississippi College + | 8 | – | 0 | – | 0 | 8 | – | 0 | – | 0 |
| Chattanooga + | 5 | – | 0 | – | 0 | 8 | – | 1 | – | 0 |
| Centenary + | 4 | – | 0 | – | 0 | 10 | – | 0 | – | 0 |
| Furman + | 3 | – | 0 | – | 0 | 10 | – | 1 | – | 0 |
| Georgetown (KY) | 1 | – | 0 | – | 0 | 1 | – | 0 | – | 1 |
| Stetson | 4 | – | 0 | – | 1 | 6 | – | 0 | – | 1 |
| Loyola (LA) | 1 | – | 0 | – | 1 | 6 | – | 2 | – | 2 |
| Wofford | 2 | – | 1 | – | 2 | 2 | – | 4 | – | 3 |
| Presbyterian | 2 | – | 2 | – | 1 | 3 | – | 3 | – | 3 |
| Mercer | 2 | – | 2 | – | 0 | 5 | – | 4 | – | 0 |
| Louisville | 2 | – | 2 | – | 0 | 4 | – | 4 | – | 0 |
| Louisiana College | 1 | – | 1 | – | 0 | 1 | – | 1 | – | 0 |
| Union (TN) | 2 | – | 3 | – | 0 | 6 | – | 4 | – | 0 |
| The Citadel | 2 | – | 3 | – | 1 | 3 | – | 6 | – | 1 |
| Centre | 2 | – | 3 | – | 0 | 3 | – | 6 | – | 0 |
| Howard (AL) | 1 | – | 2 | – | 1 | 7 | – | 2 | – | 2 |
| Southern College | 2 | – | 4 | – | 1 | 2 | – | 5 | – | 1 |
| Birmingham–Southern | 2 | – | 4 | – | 0 | 3 | – | 6 | – | 0 |
| Western Kentucky State Normal | 2 | – | 4 | – | 0 | 5 | – | 4 | – | 0 |
| Erskine | 1 | – | 2 | – | 1 | 2 | – | 4 | – | 1 |
| Louisiana Tech | 1 | – | 3 | – | 0 | 3 | – | 5 | – | 0 |
| SW Louisiana | 1 | – | 4 | – | 0 | 2 | – | 7 | – | 1 |
| Millsaps | 1 | – | 5 | – | 0 | 3 | – | 8 | – | 0 |
| Rollins | 0 | – | 2 | – | 0 | 1 | – | 5 | – | 0 |
| Transylvania | 0 | – | 5 | – | 0 | 0 | – | 9 | – | 0 |
| Newberry | 0 | – | 6 | – | 0 | 0 | – | 8 | – | 1 |
| Kentucky Wesleyan | 0 | – | 0 | – | 0 | 0 | – | 0 | – | 0 |
+ – Conference co-champions

The 1927 Loyola Wolf Pack football team was an American football team that represented Loyola College of New Orleans (now known as Loyola University New Orleans) as an independent during the 1927 college football season. In June 1927, Loyola hired Clark Shaughnessy as its new head football coach. He had been a coach at Tulane for the prior 11 years. Shaughnessy remained at Loyola for six season; he was later inducted into the College Football Hall of Fame. In its first season under Shaughnessy, the team compiled a 6–2–2 record and outscored opponents by a total of 130 to 41.

== Schedule ==
| Date | Opponent | Site | Result | Attendance | Source |
|---|---|---|---|---|---|
| September 24 | Rice* | Loyola Stadium; New Orleans, LA | W 13–0 | | |
| October 1 | at Howard (AL) | Rickwood Field; Birmingham, AL | T 0–0 | | |
| October 8 | Union (TN) | Loyola Stadium; New Orleans, LA | W 38–8 | | |
| October 16 | Loyola (MD)* | Loyola Stadium; New Orleans, LA | W 19–0 | 6,000 | |
| October 22 | Southwestern Louisiana* | Loyola Stadium; New Orleans, LA | W 28–0 | | |
| October 30 | St. Edward's (TX)* | Loyola Stadium; New Orleans, LA | T 6–6 | | |
| November 12 | at Haskell* | Haskell Memorial Stadium; Lawrence, KS | L 0–3 | | |
| November 19 | Loyola (IL)* | Loyola Stadium; New Orleans, LA | W 19–12 | | |
| November 26 | Lombard* | Loyola Stadium; New Orleans, LA | W 7–6 | | |
| December 3 | Quantico Marines* | Loyola Stadium; New Orleans, LA | L 0–6 | | |
*Non-conference game
