= 1929 College Football All-Southern Team =

American all-star college football team

The 1929 College Football All-Southern Team consists of American football players selected to the College Football All-Southern Teams selected by various organizations for the 1929 Southern Conference football season. Tulane won the SoCon championship.

== Composite eleven ==
The All-Southern eleven compiled by the Associated Press included:

- Dick Abernathy, tackle for Vanderbilt.
- Bill Banker, halfback for Tulane, inducted into the College Football Hall of Fame in 1977. He was known as the "Blonde Blizzard" due to his blonde hair and playing without a helmet. During the 1929 game with Georgia Tech, Banker wore a helmet onto the field because coach Bernie Bierman threatened to yank him out of the game. But the helmet slipped over his eyes as the Yellow Jackets were preparing to kickoff, so Banker tossed it to the sideline, and was never taken out, calling Bierman's bluff. He was featured as part of the All-American football team in the 1930 Warner Bros. feature movie Maybe It's Love.
- Bull Brown, guard for Vanderbilt. Dan McGugin called him one of his six greatest players.
- Bobby Dodd, quarterback for Tennessee, later coached Georgia Tech to a national title. He was inducted into the College Football Hall of Fame in 1993.
- Ray Farris, guard and captain for North Carolina, third-team All-America. The 1929 team scored a school record 346 points. The season was seen as a great turnaround for the UNC football team, led by the "hell-for-leather guard" Farris.
- Tony Holm, fullback for Alabama, unanimous selection, first-team AP All-America.
- Gene McEver, halfback for Tennessee, received the most selections, inducted into the College Football Hall of Fame in 1954. In December 2008, Sports Illustrated undertook to identify the individuals who would have been awarded the Heisman Trophy in college football's early years, before the trophy was established. McEver was selected as the would-be Heisman winner for the 1929 season.
- Loyd Roberts, center for Tulane, anchored the line for the undefeated SoCon champion.
- Fred Sington, tackle for Alabama. He was elected to the College Football Hall of Fame in 1955. Sington was chosen for an Associated Press Southeast Area All-Time football team 1920–1969 era.
- Vernon "Catfish" Smith, end for Georgia. Just a sophomore, he scored all 15 points for Georgia in an upset of Yale—scoring one touchdown by falling on a blocked punt in the end zone and another by receiving a pass, kicking an extra point and tackling a Yale player for a safety
- Dale Van Sickel, end for Florida. He was inducted into the Hall of Fame, and was later a Hollywood stuntman.

== All-Southerns of 1929 ==
=== Ends ===
- Vernon "Catfish" Smith, Georgia (College Football Hall of Fame) (AP-1, UP, WB-1, WA-2)
- Dale Van Sickel, Florida (College Football Hall of Fame) (AP-1, CP)
- Paul Hug, Tennessee (AP-2, AJ, WB-1, WA-1)
- Jerry Dalrymple, Tulane (College Football Hall of Fame) (AP-2, AJ, WB-2, WA-3)
- Fritz Brandt, Tennessee (UP, WB-2, WA-3)
- Wear Schoonover, Arkansas (College Football Hall of Fame) (CP)
- Jack Holland, Tulane (WA-1)
- Jimmy Moore, Alabama (WA-2)

=== Tackles ===
- Fred Sington, Alabama (College Football Hall of Fame) (AP-1, AJ, WB-1, CP, WA-1)
- Dick Abernathy, Vanderbilt (AP-1, WB-2, WA-3)
- Bill Drury, Kentucky (WB-1, AJ, WA-2)
- Gordy Brown, Texas (CP)
- Molton Smith, Alabama (WB-2, WA-2)
- Vance Maree, Georgia Tech (WA-1)
- Louis G. Chadwick, VMI (WA-3)

=== Guards ===
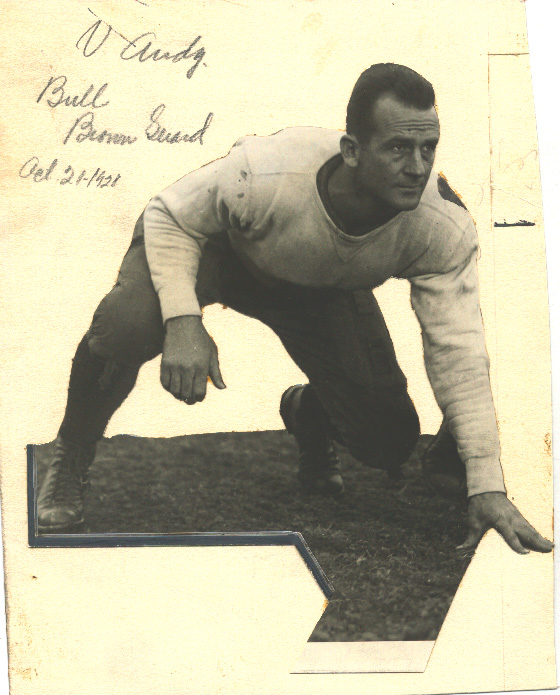
Bull Brown.

- Ray Farris, North Carolina (AP-1, UP, AJ, WB-1, WA-1)
- Bull Brown, Vanderbilt (AP-1, AJ, WB-1, WA-1)
- Jimmy Steele, Florida (AP-2, UP, WB-2, CP, WA-2)
- Maury Bodenger, Tulane (AP-2)
- Barton Koch, Baylor (College Football Hall of Fame) (CP)
- Milton Leathers, Georgia (WB-2, WA-2)
- Harry Thayer, Tennessee (WA-3)
- J. O. Brooke, Georgia Tech (WA-3)

=== Centers ===
- Loyd Roberts, Tulane (AP-1, UP, AJ, WB-1, WA-1)
- Julian Bealle, South Carolina (AP-2, WB-2)
- Noble Atkins, Texas Christian (CP)
- Jess Eberdt, Alabama (WA-2)
- Ned Lipscomb, North Carolina (WA-3)

=== Quarterbacks ===
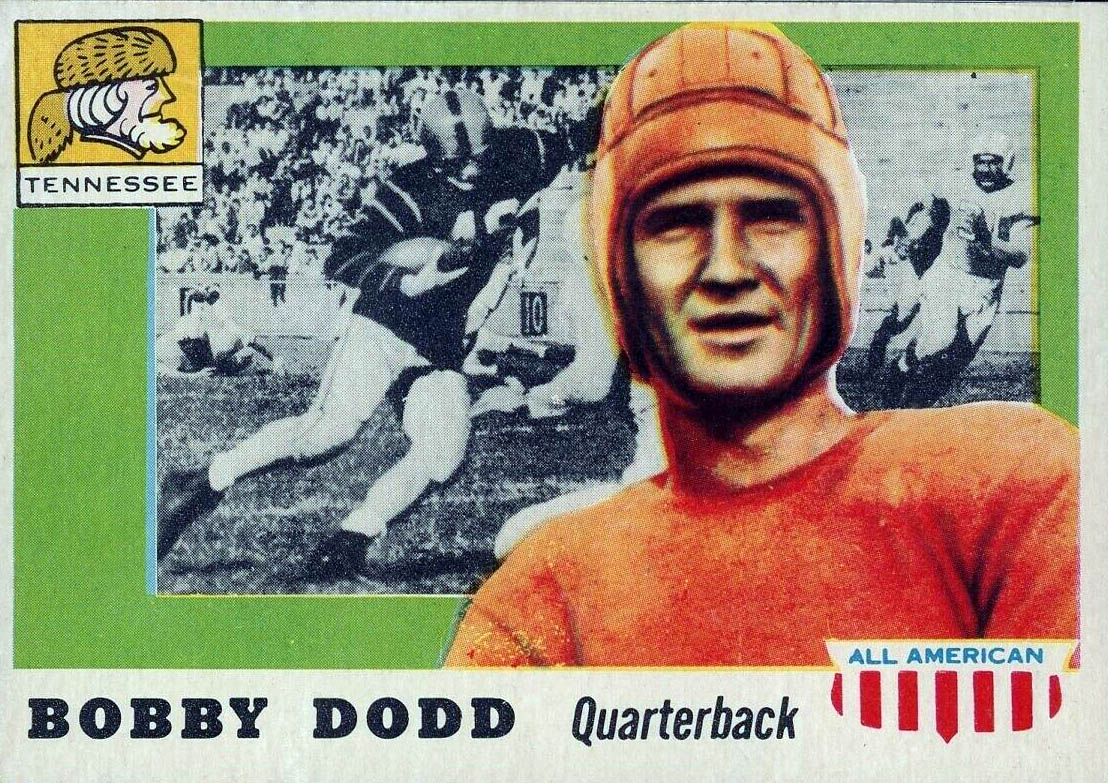
Bobby Dodd.

- Bobby Dodd, Tennessee (College Football Hall of Fame) (AP-1, UP, AJ, WB-1, WA-2)
- John "Shipwreck" Kelly, Kentucky (AP-2, WB-2, WA-2 [as hb])
- Benny Parker, Vanderbilt (WA-3)

=== Halfbacks ===
- Gene McEver*†, Tennessee (College Football Hall of Fame) (AP-1, UP, AJ, WB-1, CP, WA-1)
- Billy Banker†, Tulane (College Football Hall of Fame) (AP-1, UP, AJ, WB-1, CP, WA-1 [as qb])
- Stumpy Thomason, Georgia Tech (AP-2, WB-2 [as fb], CP [as qb], WA-1)
- Jim Magner, North Carolina (AP-2, WA-2)
- Buddy Hackman, Tennessee (WB-2)
- Sam Buie, Duke (WB-2)
- Amos Leonard, Vanderbilt (WA-3)
- Strud Nash, North Carolina (WA-3)

=== Fullbacks ===
- Tony Holm†, Alabama (AP-1, UP, AJ, WB-1, CP, WA-1)
- Rainey Cawthon, Florida (AP-2, WA-2)
- Bennie Rothstein, Georgia (WA-3)

== Key ==
Bold = Composite selection

* = Consensus All-American

† = Unanimous selection

AP = selected by the Associated Press from more than 50 coaches and sports writers. It had a first and second team.

UP = selected by the United Press.

AJ = the composite selection of seven sportswriters compiled by Zipp Newman. The Atlanta Journal awarded the eleven gold medals.

WB = selected by William Braucher, sportswriter for the NEA Service. He had a first and second team.

CP = selected by football fans of the south through Central Press newspapers.

WA = selected by William Alexander, coach at Georgia Institute of Technology. It had a first, second, and third team.

== See also ==
- 1929 College Football All-America Team
