= 1928 All-Southwest Conference football team =

American college football all-star team

The 1928 All-Southwest Conference football team consists of American football players chosen by various sports writers and officials for All-Southwest Conference teams for the 1928 college football season.

== All Southwest selections ==
=== Quarterbacks ===
- Redman Hume, SMU (Hop; NR-1; FH-2; GW-1, Em-1, FM)
- Howard Grubbs, TCU (Legg-1; Em-2; NR-2; FH-1; PC)
- Jake Wilson, Baylor (Legg-2; Em-1; LG-1; PC [HB], GW-2)
- Nono Rees, Texas (FM)

=== Halfbacks ===
- Ross Love, Sr., SMU (Hop; Legg-1; NR-1; FH-1; GW-1; PC; Em-2; LG-1)
- Virgil Gilliland, Baylor (Hop; Legg-1; Em-2; FH-2; GW-1)
- Deck Shelley, Texas (Em-1; FM [FB]; NR-2; LG-1, GW-2)
- Tommy Hughes, Texas (Em-2; NR-2; FH-1; LG-1)
- Milton Perkins, Texas (Legg-2; NR-1; FH-2)
- Hertin (Legg-2)
- Charleton Fincher, SMU (GW-2)

=== Fullbacks ===
- Garland 'Bevo' Beavers, Arkansas (Em-1; FM [HB]; NR-1; FH-1; GW-1; PC)
- Rufus King, Texas (Hop; Legg-2; FH-2)
- Herschel Burgess, Texas A&M (Legg-1)
- Griffith (NR-2)
- Dorsey, Texas A&M (GW-2)

=== Ends ===
- Bill Ford, Texas (Legg-1; Em-1; FM; NR-1; FH-1; LG-1; GW-1; PC)
- S. J. Petty, Texas A&M (Em-1; FM; NR-1; FH-1; LG-1; GW-1; PC)
- Wear Schoonover, Arkansas (Legg-1; Em-2; FH-2, GW-2)
- Dusty Rhoads, Texas (Hop; Legg-2)
- Shaerdel, SMU (Hop)
- Trigg (Legg-2; Em-2; NR-2; FH-2, GW-2)
- Lucas (NR-2)

=== Tackles ===
- Gordy Brown, Texas (Hop; Legg-1; Em-1; FM; NR-2; FH-1; LG-1; GW-1; PC)
- Jake Williams, TCU (Hop; Legg-1; Em-1; NR-1; FH-1; LG-1; GW-1; PC)
- Griffin, Baylor (FM; NR-1; FH-2)
- Moore (Legg-2)
- Alva Winters, Arkansas (Legg-2; NR-2, GW-2)
- Knippel, Rice (FH-2)
- Jack Cowley, Texas (GW-2)

=== Guards ===
- Choc Sanders, SMU (Hop; Legg-1; Em-1; NR-1; FH-2; LG-1; GW-1; PC)
- Clyde Van Sickle, Arkansas (Legg-1; Em-2 [T]; NR-2; FH-1; LG-1; GW-1; PC)
- Mike Brumbelow, TCU (Hop; Em-2; NR-1; FH-2, GW-2)
- Barton Koch, Baylor (Legg-2; Em-1; NR-2; FH-1, GW-2)
- Charlie Richter, Texas A&M (FM)
- Milan Creighton, Arkansas (FM)
- Phillips (Legg-2)
- Jones (Em-2)

=== Centers ===
- Z. W. Bartlett, Texas A&M (NR-2; FH-1; LG-1; GW-1; PC; Em-2)
- Malcolm Powell, SMU (Hop; Legg-1; Em-2, GW-2)
- Noble Atkins, TCU (Em-1; NR-1; FH-2)
- Steve Wray, Texas (FM)
- Burnett (Legg-2)

== Key ==
Hop = A. S. "Hop" Hopkins, sports editor Austin American

Legg = Don Legg, sports editor Austin Statesman

Em = Victor Emanuel, sports editor Galveston News

FM = Fred Mosebach, sports editor San Antonio Express

NR = Ned Record, sports editor Fort Worth Record-Telegram

FH = Flem Hall, sports editor Fort Worth Star-Telegram

LG = Lloyd Gregory, sports editor Houston Post-Dispatch

GW = George White, sports editor Dallas News

PC = Pete Cawthorn, Southwest Conference official

== See also ==
- 1928 College Football All-America Team
