= 1927 All-Southwest Conference football team =

American college football all-star team

The 1927 All-Southwest Conference football team consists of American football players chosen by various sports writers and officials for All-Southwest Conference teams for the 1927 college football season.

== All Southwest selections ==
=== Quarterbacks ===
- Joel Hunt, Texas A&M (AP-1, Duby-1, DM-1, ASR-1, MS-1 [hb], WTH-1)

=== Halfbacks ===
- Gerald Mann, SMU (AP-1, Duby-1, DM-1, ASR-1, MS-1 [qb], WTH-1)
- George Cole, Arkansas (AP-1, Duby-1 [fb], DM-1, ASR-1, MS-1 [fb], WTH-1)
- Joe King, Texas (Duby-1, AP-2, MS-2)
- Hershel Burgess, Texas A&M (AP-2, MS-2)
- Murray, Rice (AP-2)
- Emmanuel Braden, Rice (MS-2)

=== Fullbacks ===
- Redman Hume, SMU (AP-1, DM-1, ASR-1, MS-1 [hb], WTH-1)
- Love, SMU (AP-2, MS-2)

=== Ends ===
- Rags Matthews, TCU (AP-1, Duby-1, DM-1, ASR-1, MS-1, WTH-1)
- Jules V. Sikes, Texas A&M (AP-1, ASR-1, MS-2)
- Glen Rose, Arkansas (Duby-1, DM-1, MS-1, AP-2)
- Stanley Dawson, SMU (WTH-1, AP-2, MS-2)

=== Tackles ===
- W.S. Lister, Texas A&M (AP-1, MS-1)
- John Roach, SMU (AP-1, MS-1)
- A. C. Sprott, Texas A&M (DM-1, ASR-1, WTH-1, AP-2)
- L. "Ox" Higgins, Texas (Duby-1, WTH-1 [g], AP-2, MS-2)
- Gordy Brown, Texas (DM-1, ASR-1)
- Jake Williams, TCU (Duby-1, AP-2, MS-2)

=== Guards ===
- Klepto Holmes, Texas A&M (AP-1, MS-1)
- Ike Sewell, Texas (AP-1, Duby-1, DM-1, ASR-1, MS-2)
- E. E. Figari, Texas A&M (Duby-1, DM-1, WTH-1, AP-2)
- Tatum, SMU (ASR-1, MS-1, WTH-1 [t])
- Merle Comstock, Rice (MS-2)

=== Centers ===
- Pottie McCullough, Texas (AP-1, Duby-1, DM-1, ASR-1, MS-2)
- Z. W. Bartlett, Texas A&M (MS-1, AP-2)
- Smith, Baylor (WTH-1)

== Key ==
- AP = Associated Press
- Duby = Duby (Hugh DuBose, sports editor of the Austin Statesman-American)
- DM = Dick McMurray, Austin Statesman
- ASR = Austin Statesman readers
- MS = Milt Saul of the Dallas News
- WTH = Waco Times-Herald based on voting by 162 fans and readers

== See also ==
- 1927 College Football All-America Team
