= Fritz Brandt =

American football player

No. 31
- Position: End

Personal information
- Born: c. 1909; Erwin, Tennessee
- Died: November 30, 1972; Knoxville, Tennessee

Career information
- College: Tennessee (1928–1930)

Awards and highlights
- All-Southern (1929)

Fritz Brandt (c. 1909 – November 30, 1972) was a college football player, one of the "flaming sophomores" on the 1928 Tennessee Volunteers that went 9–0–1. As an end, he played opposite Paul Hug. He was injured in the 1929 game against Centre. Brandt was selected All-Southern by the United Press.
