= Sprankle =

Sprankle is a surname. Notable people with the surname include:

- Dale R. Sprankle (1898–1963), American sports coach and athletic director, brother of LeRoy
- LeRoy Sprankle (1894–1972), American high school sports coach and athletics advocate
