= Choc Sanders =

American football player, coach, and teacher (1900–1972)

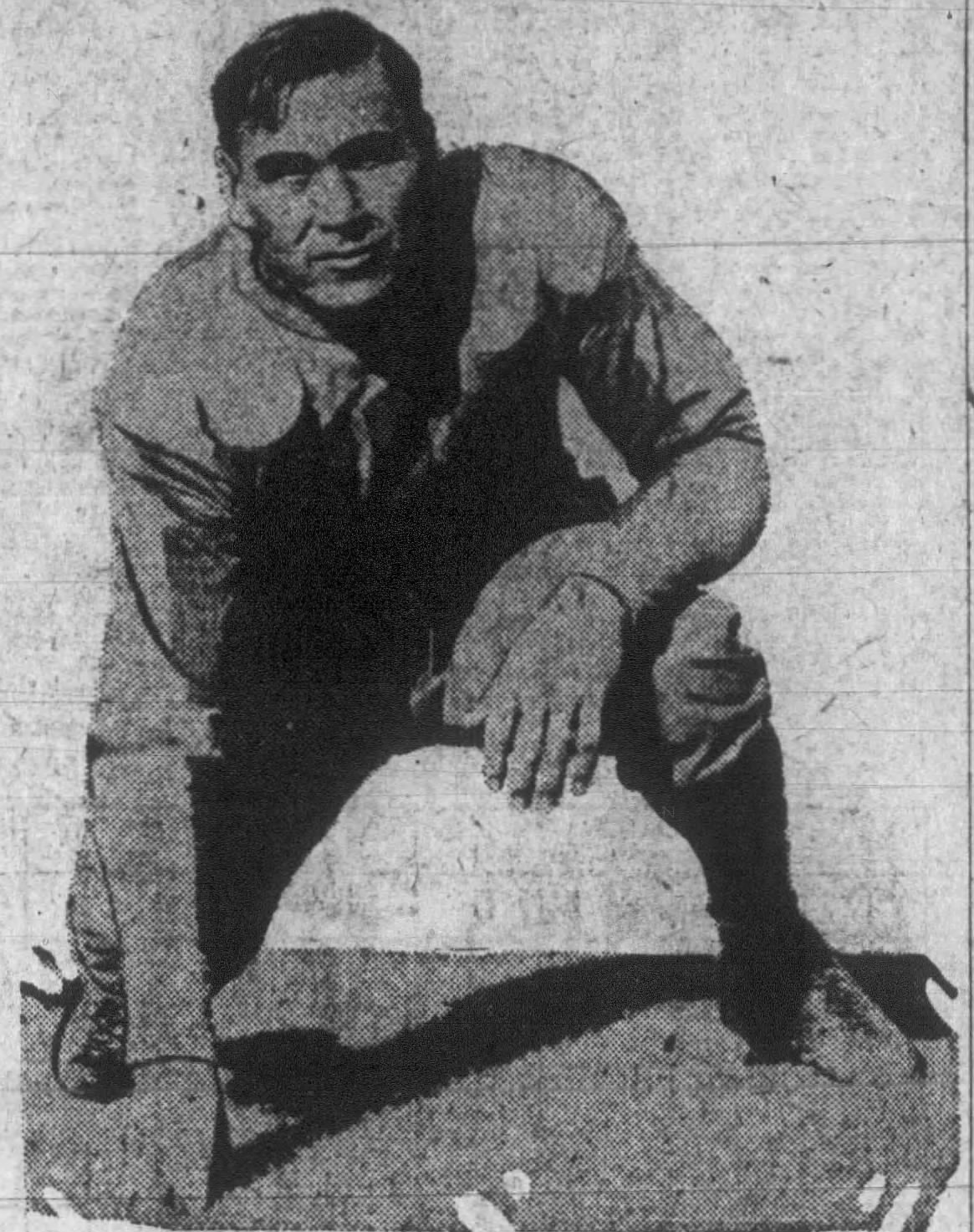
- Sanders in 1929

Biographical details
- Born: July 26, 1900; Garland, Texas, U.S.
- Died: March 16, 1972 (aged 71); Odessa, Texas, U.S.

Playing career

Football
- 1927–1929: SMU
- Position: Guard

Coaching career (HC unless noted)

Football
- 1930–1935: John Tarleton (assistant)
- 1936–1937: John Tarleton
- 1938–1943: Allen Academy
- 1944: Lamesa HS (TX) (assistant)
- 1945: Lamesa HS (TX)

Basketball
- 1938–1942: Allen Academy

Administrative career (AD unless noted)
- 1946–1948: Lamesa HS (TX)

Head coaching record
- Overall: 10–7–2 (junior college football)

Accomplishments and honors

Awards
- Third-team All-American (1928); All-Southern (1928); 2× First-team All-SWC (1928, 1929)

Henry Jackson "Choc" Sanders (July 26, 1900 – March 16, 1972) was an American college football player, athletics coach and administrator, and educator. He player football as a guard at Southern Methodist University (SMU), where was first All-American for the Mustangs and captain of the 1929 SMU Mustangs football team. Sanders served as the head football coach at John Tarleton Agricultural College—now known as Tarleton State University—in Stephenville, Texas from 1936 to 1937.

Sanders was an assistant football coach at John Tarleton from 1930 to 1935 under W. J. Wisdom before succeeding him as head football coach in 1936. Sanders resigned after the 1937 season and was replaced by James Earl Rudder. In 1938, Sanders was hired by Allen Academy in Bryan, Texas, where he coached football, basketball, baseball, and track. In 1944, he left Allen Academy to coach at Lamesa High School in Lamesa, Texas. Sanders was an assistant football coach at Lamesa in 1944 under H. S. "Gob" Fitzgerald. The following year, he served as Lamesa's head football coach. Sanders was succeeded as head football coach in 1946 by Jim Neill, and was appointed faculty manager and coordinator of physical education and athletics. He was later athletic director at Lamesa and also coached basketball, baseball, and tennis. Sanders resigned from his position at Lamesa in 1948, and moved with his wife to Odessa, Texas.

Sanders died on March 16, 1972, at Medical Center Hospital in Odessa, following a short illness.

== Head coaching record ==
=== Junior college football ===
Year	Team	Overall	Conference	Standing	Bowl/playoffs
John Tarleton Plowboys (Central Texas Conference) (1936–1937)
1936	John Tarleton	4–5	3–2	3rd	
1937	John Tarleton	6–2–2	3–0–1	T–1st	L CTC championship game
John Tarleton:		10–7–2	6–2–1		
Total:		10–7–2			
National championship Conference title Conference division title or championship game berth
