= Baylor–Rice football rivalry =

American college football rivalry between the Baylor Bears and Rice Owls

- Baylor Bears Rice Owls
- First meeting: November 20, 1914; Rice, 14–13
- Latest meeting: September 21, 2019; Baylor, 21–13
- Next meeting: TBD
- Trophy: None

Statistics
- Total meetings: 82
- All-time series: Baylor leads 50–30–2
- Largest victory: Baylor, 70–17 (2015); Rice, 32–0 (1934), 38–6 (1946)
- Longest win streak: Baylor, 9 (1993–present)
- Current win streak: Baylor, 9 (1993–present)

Locations of Baylor and Rice

The Baylor–Rice football rivalry is an American college football rivalry between the Baylor Bears and Rice Owls.

== History ==
The schools both reside 183 miles from each other within the U.S. state of Texas. From 1915 to 1995, the teams were members of the Southwest Conference (SWC) and met on an annual basis from 1924 to 1995 with the exception of 1943 and 1944 due to World War II. From 1924 to 1975, the game was played exclusively on either the fourth weekend in November or the first weekend in December as the regular season finale for both teams, except for 1963 when Baylor's scheduled game against SMU and Rice's scheduled game against TCU were moved back two weeks from November 23 due to the assassination of John F. Kennedy in Dallas on November 22. After the Southwest Conference added Houston as a full-time member in 1976, the annual game between the Bears and Owls was moved to the middle of November where it was played through 1995, with the exception of 1991 when the game was played in mid-October.

After the breakup of the SWC following the 1995 season, Baylor was among the four SWC schools invited to join the new Big 12 Conference while Rice was left out. This brought an end to the annual rivalry between the Bears and Owls, but the teams have faced off intermittently since that time, most recently in 2019. The 2016 meeting between the schools was notable for a controversial halftime performance of the Marching Owl Band, who formed a Roman numeral IX in a mocking reference to Title IX and the Baylor University sexual assault scandal. The Rice University administration apologized the next day for the gesture. However, as of May 2025, there are no plans for the teams to meet again on the football field.

== Game results ==
Baylor victories	Rice victories	Tie games

No.	Date	Location	Winner	Score
1	November 20, 1914	Houston, TX	Rice	14–13
2	October 8, 1915	Houston, TX	Baylor	26–0
3	October 11, 1919	Waco, TX	Rice	8–0
4	October 9, 1920	Houston, TX	Rice	28–0
5	October 8, 1921	Waco, TX	Baylor	17–14
6	October 14, 1922	Houston, TX	Baylor	31–0
7	November 27, 1924	Houston, TX	Baylor	17–9
8	November 26, 1925	Houston, TX	Tie	7–7
9	November 25, 1926	Houston, TX	Baylor	9–7
10	November 24, 1927	Houston, TX	Rice	19–12
11	November 29, 1928	Houston, TX	Baylor	25–14
12	November 30, 1929	Houston, TX	Baylor	19–0
13	November 29, 1930	Waco, TX	Baylor	7–4
14	November 28, 1931	Houston, TX	Rice	20–0
15	November 26, 1932	Houston, TX	Rice	12–0
16	December 2, 1933	Waco, TX	Baylor	7–6
17	December 1, 1934	Waco, TX	Rice	32–0
18	November 30, 1935	Houston, TX	Baylor	8–0
19	November 28, 1936	Houston, TX	Baylor	10–7
20	November 27, 1937	Houston, TX	Rice	13–7
21	November 26, 1938	Houston, TX	Baylor	21–6
22	December 2, 1939	Houston, TX	Baylor	10–7
23	November 30, 1940	Houston, TX	Rice	21–12
24	November 29, 1941	Houston, TX	Rice	28–14
25	November 28, 1942	Waco, TX	Rice	20–0
26	December 1, 1945	Houston, TX	Baylor	17–14
27	November 30, 1946	Houston, TX	No. 13 Rice	38–6
28	November 29, 1947	Houston, TX	No. 18 Rice	34–6
29	November 27, 1948	Waco, TX	Tie	7–7
30	November 26, 1949	Houston, TX	No. 7 Rice	21–7
31	December 2, 1950	Waco, TX	Baylor	33–7
32	December 1, 1951	Houston, TX	No. 9 Baylor	34–14
33	November 29, 1952	Waco, TX	Rice	20–14
34	November 28, 1953	Houston, TX	No. 8 Rice	41–19
35	November 27, 1954	Waco, TX	Rice	20–14
36	November 26, 1955	Houston, TX	Baylor	15–7
37	December 1, 1956	Waco, TX	No. 15 Baylor	46–13
38	November 30, 1957	Houston, TX	No. 9 Rice	20–0
39	November 29, 1958	Waco, TX	Rice	33–21
40	November 28, 1959	Houston, TX	Baylor	23–21
41	November 26, 1960	Waco, TX	No. 19 Baylor	12–7
42	December 2, 1961	Houston, TX	No. 17 Rice	26–14

No.	Date	Location	Winner	Score
43	December 1, 1962	Waco, TX	Baylor	28–15
44	November 30, 1963	Houston, TX	Baylor	21–12
45	November 28, 1964	Waco, TX	Baylor	27–20
46	November 27, 1965	Houston, TX	Baylor	17–13
47	November 26, 1966	Waco, TX	Baylor	21–14
48	December 2, 1967	Houston, TX	Rice	27–25
49	November 30, 1968	Waco, TX	Baylor	16–7
50	November 29, 1969	Houston, TX	Rice	34–6
51	November 28, 1970	Waco, TX	Rice	28–23
52	November 27, 1971	Houston, TX	Rice	23–0
53	December 2, 1972	Waco, TX	Baylor	28–14
54	December 1, 1973	Houston, TX	Rice	27–0
55	November 30, 1974	Waco, TX	No. 16 Baylor	24–3
56	November 29, 1975	Houston, TX	Baylor	25–7
57	November 13, 1976	Houston, TX	Baylor	28–6
58	November 12, 1977	Waco, TX	Baylor	24–14
59	November 18, 1978	Houston, TX	Rice	24–10
60	November 17, 1979	Waco, TX	No. 20 Baylor	45–14
61	November 15, 1980	Houston, TX	No. 12 Baylor	16–6
62	November 14, 1981	Waco, TX	Rice	17–14
63	November 13, 1982	Houston, TX	Baylor	35–13
64	November 12, 1983	Waco, TX	Baylor	48–14
65	November 17, 1984	Houston, TX	Baylor	46–40
66	November 16, 1985	Waco, TX	No. 17 Baylor	34–10
67	November 15, 1986	Houston, TX	No. 18 Baylor	23–17
68	November 14, 1987	Waco, TX	Baylor	34–31
69	November 12, 1988	Houston, TX	Baylor	20–10
70	November 18, 1989	Waco, TX	Rice	6–3
71	November 17, 1990	Houston, TX	Baylor	17–16
72	October 12, 1991	Waco, TX	Rice	20–17
73	November 14, 1992	Houston, TX	Rice	34–31
74	November 13, 1993	Waco, TX	Baylor	38–14
75	November 12, 1994	Houston, TX	Baylor	19–14
76	November 18, 1995	Waco, TX	Baylor	34–6
77	September 8, 2007	Waco, TX	Baylor	42–17
78	September 25, 2010	Houston, TX	Baylor	30–13
79	September 24, 2011	Waco, TX	No. 17 Baylor	56–31
80	September 26, 2015	Waco, TX	No. 5 Baylor	70–17
81	September 16, 2016	Houston, TX	No. 21 Baylor	38–10
82	September 21, 2019	Houston, TX	Baylor	21–13
Series: Baylor leads 50–30–2

Game results sources:

== See also ==
- List of NCAA college football rivalry games
