= Deck Shelley =

American football player (1906–1968)

No. 5, 3, 15, 29
- Position: Back

Personal information
- Born: June 4, 1906; San Antonio, Texas, U.S.
- Died: December 17, 1968 (aged 62); Temple, Texas, U.S.
- Listed height: 5 ft 11 in (1.80 m)
- Listed weight: 191 lb (87 kg)

Career information
- College: Texas

Career history
- Providence Steam Roller (1931); Portsmouth Spartans (1931); Green Bay Packers (1932); Chicago Cardinals (1932)

Awards and highlights
- 3× First-team All-SWC (1928, 1929, 1930)

Career NFL statistics
- Rushing attempts: 10
- Rushing yards: 14
- Passing attempts: 1
- Completions: 1
- Passing yards: 3
- Touchdowns: 3
- Stats at Pro Football Reference

Robert Pendexter "Dexter" "Deck" Shelley (June 4, 1906 – December 17, 1968) was born and raised in San Antonio. He was recruited to play high school football in Dallas for the Terrill School, a forerunner of St. Mark's School of Texas. He went on to become an all conference running back for the University of Texas. During the 1929 edition of the rivalry game between Texas and the University of Oklahoma, Shelley recovered an early fumble on defense and then scored a rushing touchdown to catalyze the victory.

== Professional career ==
Shelley was a player in the National Football League. He split the 1931 NFL season between the Providence Steam Roller and the Portsmouth Spartans before splitting the following season between the Green Bay Packers and the Chicago Cardinals.

He was a running back on offense and a defensive back and linebacker on defense.

== See also ==
- Notable alumni of St. Mark's School of Texas
