= Bull Brown =

American football and baseball player

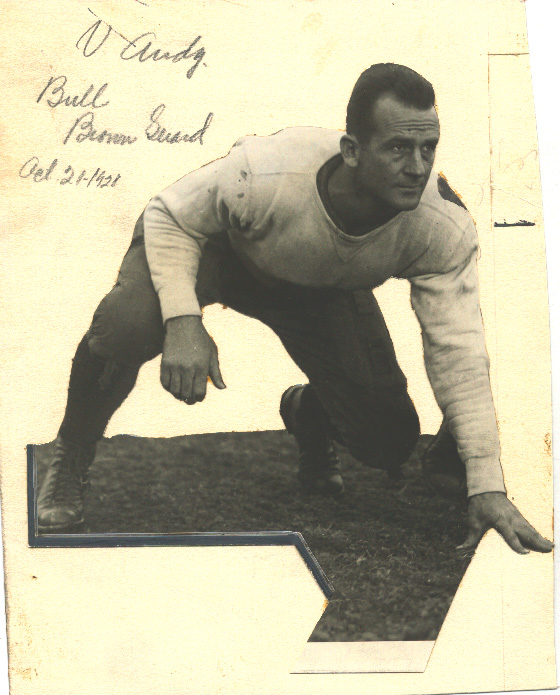
- Brown c. 1928

Profile
- Position: Guard

Personal information
- Born: c. 1905; Ardmore, Alabama
- Listed height: 6 ft 0 in (1.83 m)
- Listed weight: 200 lb (91 kg)

Career information
- High school: Morgan School
- College: Vanderbilt (1926; 1928–1929)

Awards and highlights
- First-team All-American (1929); Second-team All-American (1928); All-Southern (1928, 1929); Ranked by coach Dan McGugin as one of his six best players; 1934 All-time Vandy team.

John Neil "Bull" Brown was an American football and baseball player for the Vanderbilt Commodores of Vanderbilt University. He was said by coach Dan McGugin to be one of his six best players ever coached. He was selected All-Southern in 1928 and 1929, and All-American in 1929. One of his best games came tackling Minnesota running back Bronko Nagurski. He ran 85 yards for a touchdown on 1928 national champion Georgia Tech. He was from Ardmore, Alabama.

== See also ==
- 1929 College Football All-America Team
