= Baylor Bears football =

American college football team

2026 Baylor Bears football team
- First season: 1899; 127 years ago
- Athletic director: Doug McNamee
- Head coach: Joe Klanderman (interim)
- Location: Waco, Texas
- Stadium: McLane Stadium (capacity: 50,223)
- NCAA division: Division I FBS
- Conference: Big 12
- Colors: Green and gold
- All-time record: 632–609–44 (.509)
- Bowl record: 14–14 (.500)

Conference championships
- SWC: 1915, 1916, 1922, 1924, 1974, 1980, 1994 Big 12: 2013, 2014, 2021
- Heisman winners: Robert Griffin III – 2011
- Consensus All-Americans: 18
- Rivalries: Houston (rivalry); Rice (rivalry); TCU (rivalry); Texas Tech (rivalry); Texas (rivalry); Texas A&M (rivalry)

Uniforms
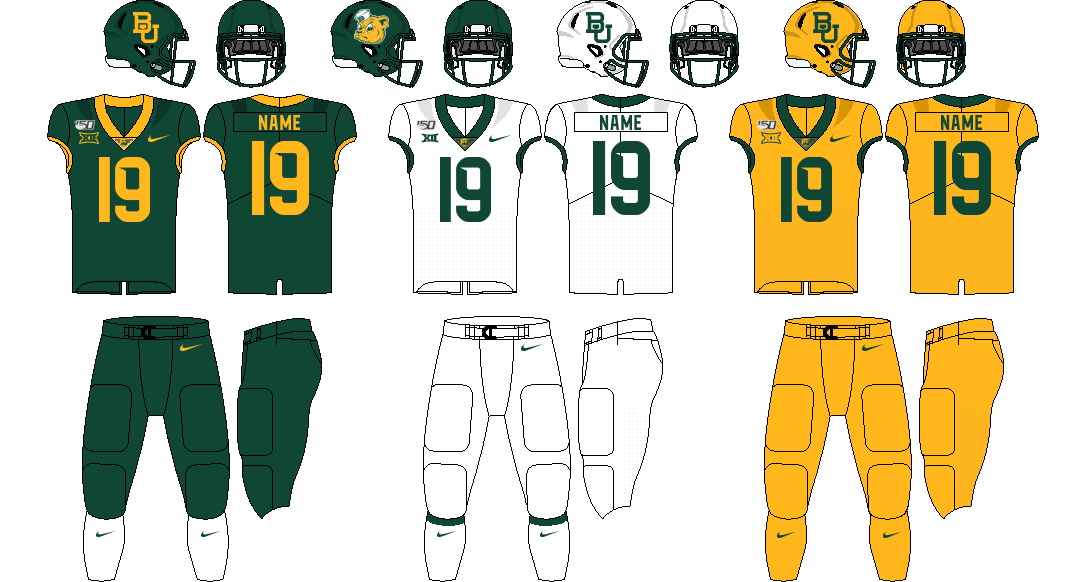
- Fight song: Old Fight
- Mascot: Bruiser and Marigold
- Marching band: The Golden Wave Band
- Outfitter: Nike
- Website: BaylorBears.com

The Baylor Bears football team represents Baylor University in Division I FBS college football. They are a member of the Big 12 Conference. After 64 seasons at the off-campus Baylor Stadium, renamed Floyd Casey Stadium in 1988, the Bears opened the new on-campus McLane Stadium for the 2014 season.

== History ==
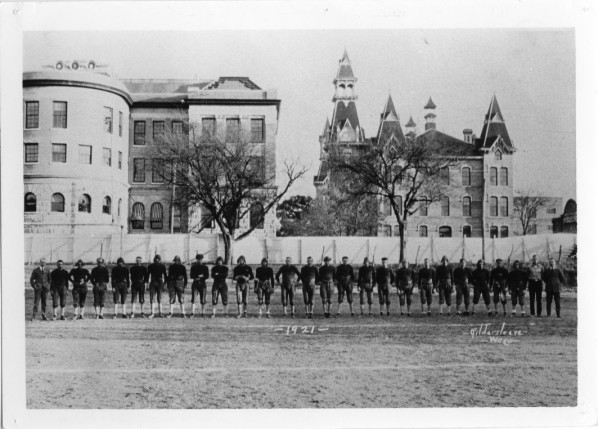
Baylor Football Team Circa 1921

=== Early history ===
Baylor University's football team has seen a wide variation in its success through the years, including an undefeated 3–0 perfect record in 1900.

Initially, starting in the year 1898, the university played its home games on an unnamed field near the university campus. Beginning in 1905, the team's home games were played at Carroll Field, between the Carroll Science Building and Waco Creek. Baylor did not adopt a mascot (the Baylor Bears) until December 14, 1914, after the completion of the 1914 football season. Additionally, Baylor did not join an athletic conference until 1914 after the conclusion of the football season, when it became a founding member of the Southwest Conference. Baylor played its first home game against Toby's Business College (located in Waco) in 1899, its first away game on 4 November 1900, at Austin College, and its first neutral-site game against Texas A&M in 1901.

For the 1899 and 1900 seasons, the team was coached by R.H. Hamilton, whose 5–1–1 record was distinguished with never having a losing record; in 1899, Baylor played, and lost, its first game against Texas A&M, which would become a rivalry (until 2012 when Texas A&M changed conferences), the Battle of the Brazos, with over 100 games played in the series by 2003. W.J. Ritchie coached the 1901 team, leading it to a 5–3 record; in this year, the first games of the Baylor-Texas and Baylor-TCU series were played. Texas Christian University (known as AddRan Male & Female College until 1902) was located in Waco from 1895 to 1910 and was one of Baylor's greatest football rivals until the dissolution of the Southwest Conference in 1995. The 1901 season also welcomed Baylor's first Thanksgiving Day football game, with a 28–0 win over St. Edward's University. J.C. Ewing took control of the team in 1902, and led it to its first losing season, with a 3–4–2 record. R.N. Watts restored Baylor's winning tradition in 1903, with a record of 4–3–1.

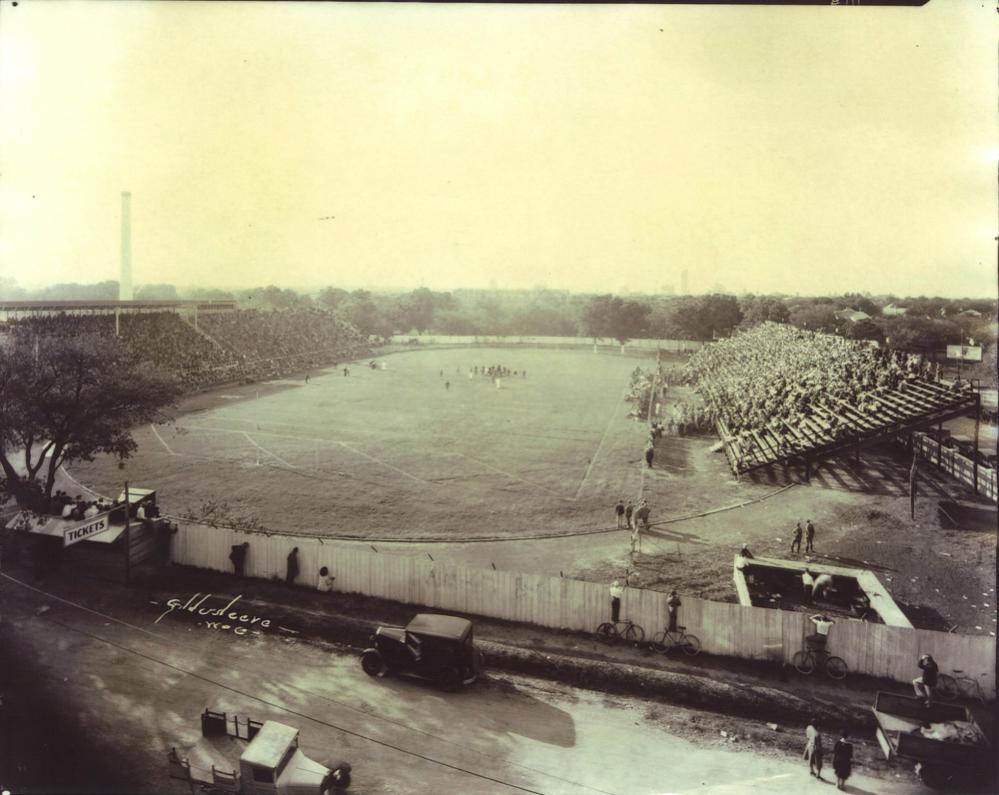
Carroll Field

No team was fielded in 1906 following a ban opposing the violence of football; along with 1943 and 1944 (during World War II), 1906 is one of three seasons since 1899 that Baylor has not competed in varsity football. Luther Burleson headed the restored football team in 1907, and managed a 4–3–1 record. E.J. Mills led the team for the 1908 and 1909 seasons; their 3–5–0 and 5–3–0 records were notable for the 1908 loss to LSU, and for the world's first "Homecoming" at the 1909 Thanksgiving Day game, which included a concert, parade, and bonfire. To this day, Baylor claims the honor of having the largest homecoming parade in the world.

Baylor has many traditions such as the Baylor-TCU rivalry game which is one of the most played in all of college football, the Battle of the Brazos (through 2011 when Texas A&M left the Big 12), membership in the historic Southwest Conference, a live bear mascot since 1915 and the Baylor Line.

In 1966, John Hill Westbrook of Elgin, Texas became the first African American to play varsity football in the Southwest Conference when he joined the Baylor team.

=== Early SWC Championships and Bowl success ===
Baylor won the SWC Championship in 1915, 1916, 1922 and again in 1924. In 1956 Baylor came close to the SWC title again but finished second and was sent to face the undefeated No. 2 Tennessee Volunteers in the 1957 Sugar Bowl. Baylor defeated Johnny Majors and the No. 2 Volunteers 13–7. This was the highest ranked opponent Baylor had ever defeated until defeating No. 1 ranked Kansas State in 2012. The 1924 SWC Championship would be the last for many decades until Baylor won the conference again in 1974 under the leadership of third year head coach Grant Teaff. From the late 1940s until the mid-1960s, Baylor also played in the 1952 Orange Bowl (vs. Georgia Tech), twice in the Gator Bowl (vs. Auburn and Florida), and the Bluebonnet (beating LSU), Dixie (beating Wake Forest) and Gotham Bowl (beating No. 10 ranked Utah St in New York City).

=== Miracle on the Brazos ===
Baylor had finished in last place in 4 of the last 7 seasons including the year before and had not won the conference championship in 50 years. Also, prior to this season, they had never appeared in the Cotton Bowl. Furthermore, coming into the 1974 season Baylor had lost 16 consecutive games to the Texas Longhorns. The 1974 Texas vs Baylor game looked like another easy win for Texas as the Longhorns took quick control of the game and went into halftime leading 24–7. Baylor was energized starting the 2nd half however, sparked by a blocked punt early in the 3rd quarter. The Bears rallied to a thrilling 34–24 victory over the Longhorns. Baylor went on to win the conference title that year and a first ever trip to the Cotton Bowl (the first time in seven seasons that Texas did not win the Southwest Conference title). The entire 1974 Baylor football season was dubbed the "Miracle on the Brazos" by many sports writers at the time. The win over Texas and the SWC championship have thus become a special part of Baylor's athletic history.

=== Grant Teaff era (1972–1992) ===
One of the most successful coaches in Baylor football history was Grant Teaff. He led the Bears to conference titles in 1974, his third year in the program, and again in 1980 when he led the Bears to the Cotton Bowl to face the Alabama Crimson Tide. Grant Teaff recruited famous players such as Mike Singletary, Thomas Everett, Walter Abercrombie and James Francis to play football at Baylor University. Teaff was also named National Coach of the Year after the 1974 season. He would go on to serve until 1992 leading Baylor to eight bowl games as well as the aforementioned Southwest Conference championships (1974, 1980) in his 21 years as head coach.

=== Chuck Reedy era (1993–1996) ===
Chuck Reedy was coach for four seasons and compiled a record of 23–22. His 1994 team was part of a 5-way co-championship of the Southwest Conference, though an ineligible Texas A&M held a better conference record. In 1996 Baylor joined Texas, Texas Tech, and Texas A&M, along with the Big 8 conference schools, to form the Big 12 Conference.

=== Roberts, Steele, and Morriss era (1997–2007) ===
Big 12 logo in Baylor's colors

Baylor was led by a succession of coaches with mediocre results. Dave Roberts was coach from 1997 to 1998 and compiled a 4–18 record. Kevin Steele followed from 1999 to 2002 and posted a 9–36 record. He was succeeded by Guy Morriss from 2003 to 2007 who compiled an 18–40 record.

=== Art Briles era (2008–2015) ===
The 2010 season marked a breakthrough for the Baylor Bears football program. The team concluded the regular season with a 7–5 record, securing an invitation to the Texas Bowl in Houston—their first bowl appearance since 1995. During the regular season, Baylor recorded Big 12 Conference victories over Kansas and Kansas State, along with road wins against Colorado and Texas.

Building on the success of the 2010 team, Baylor began the 2011 season at home with an upset of No. 14 TCU, winners of the previous season's Rose Bowl. The Bears also won their next two games before traveling to Kansas State where they lost a tightly contested game by a single point. Baylor then defeated Iowa State 49–26 for the first conference win of the year before finishing October by losing two straight on the road, to A&M and eventual conference champion No. 3 Oklahoma State. The Bears rebounded to finish the regular season, with five straight victories including a Homecoming win over Missouri, a 31–30 overtime victory at Kansas in which Baylor tied a school record by overcoming a 21-point deficit in the 4th quarter, and the program's first win over No. 5 Oklahoma on a 34-yard touchdown pass from Griffin to Terrance Williams with 8 seconds remaining in the game. Baylor concluded November in Dallas playing against Texas Tech in Cowboys Stadium; although Griffin left the game due to a concussion at the half, backup Nick Florence entered the game and led the Bears to a 66–42 victory. The Bears finished the regular season at home with a 48–24 victory over No. 22 Texas that propelled the team (9–3, 6–3 Big XII) to the Alamo Bowl with No. 12 and No. 15 BCS and AP rankings respectively, and propelled Griffin to the top of the Heisman Trophy voting; he became the first Baylor player to win the award and the first Baylor player since Don Trull in 1963 to factor significantly in the voting. In the Alamo Bowl, the Bears faced the Washington Huskies in what became the second-highest scoring bowl game in history, and the highest-scoring regulation bowl game ever. Baylor went up 21–7 early in the game, with Griffin throwing for one touchdown and rushing for another. The Huskies roared back with 28 unanswered points, and the teams finished the half with Washington leading 35–24. In the second half, with the defenses showing limited ability to cope with the high-powered offenses led by Griffin and Husky QB Keith Price, the teams traded scores. The Bears overcame the halftime deficit, going ahead for good 60–56 halfway in the 4th quarter, and Baylor RB Terrance Ganaway tacked on a final 43-yard touchdown run. Ganaway finished with 21 carries for 200 yards and 5 TDs and was recognized as the game's offensive MVP.

Baylor's 2012 season opened in Waco against the SMU Mustangs. Quarterback Nick Florence – now a senior, having burned his redshirt season to play the second half against Texas Tech in 2011 after Griffin III left with a concussion – led the Bears to a 59–24 victory. Two weeks later, a victory at home against No. 2 FCS Sam Houston State gave Baylor fans their first glimpse of things to come when Oregon transfer running back Lache Seastrunk, who entered the game in the 4th quarter, put Baylor ahead 41–23 with a 15-yard touchdown rush. Baylor then traveled to Louisiana-Monroe to face a Warhawk team which had notched a stunning victory over No. 8 Arkansas and had subsequently taken Auburn to overtime. A 47–42 Baylor victory represented the Bears' 9th consecutive win (at the time, the 2nd longest streak in the FBS) and gave the Bears a No. 24 ranking. The win streak was broken during Baylor's first trip to Morgantown, West Virginia, by a No. 7 ranked Mountaineer team playing their inaugural Big 12 conference game. The 70–63 shootout saw several Big 12 records set, notably including the single-game receiving record by Baylor receiver Terrance Williams (314 yards). The loss dropped Baylor from the rankings and represented the start of a 4-game skid during which time Baylor lost in Waco to TCU, at No. 25 Texas, and at Iowa State. A win at home against Kansas and a loss at No. 12 Oklahoma left the Bears fighting for bowl eligibility. Baylor shocked the college football world the next week by soundly beating No. 1 Kansas State in Waco 52–24. A 12-yard Florence touchdown rush in the first quarter gave Baylor a 14–7 lead which was never relinquished. The Baylor defense highlighted the game with a stout goal-line stand in the 4th quarter and intercepted Heisman hopeful Collin Klein three times, the last in the endzone to set up an 80-yard touchdown run by Lache Seastrunk. The victory over Kansas State represented the program's first ever win over a No. 1 ranked team and sparked a 3-game win streak for Baylor (with a 52–45 overtime victory over Texas Tech in Cowboys Stadium and a 41–34 victory in Waco over No. 23 Oklahoma State). During the OSU game Seastrunk again achieved recognition for a 76-yard touchdown rush, outrunning the Oklahoma State secondary despite suffering a quadriceps cramp near midfield. The conclusion of Baylor's 7–5 2012 campaign marked the first time since 1949–51 that the Bears have enjoyed three consecutive seasons with 7+ wins. On December 2, Baylor accepted a berth in the Holiday Bowl, sending the Bears to a third consecutive bowl for the first time in program history. Baylor easily defeated the No. 17-ranked UCLA Bruins in the Holiday Bowl on December 27, 2012 by a final margin of 49–26 after jumping out to a 21–0 lead early in the 2nd quarter. Lache Seastrunk (RB) and Chris McAllister (DE) were named Offensive Player and Defensive Player of the game respectively.

In 2013, Baylor had arguably its best regular season in school history. A best-ever 9–0 start propelled the Bears to a No. 3 national ranking in the AP Poll. However, after an on-the-road loss to Oklahoma State, the Bears needed victories in their last two games and an Oklahoma State loss to have an opportunity to clinch the outright Big 12 title. With the Cowboys' loss, Baylor's season-closing game against Texas — the final game at Floyd Casey Stadium — became a de facto Big 12 championship game. Baylor defeated the Longhorns, 30–10, to notch a school-record 11th win and its first outright conference title since 1980. It also assured the team a Fiesta Bowl berth, the Bears' first-ever BCS bowl appearance and their first major bowl in 33 years. Baylor was defeated in the Fiesta Bowl by the University of Central Florida 52–42. Bryce Petty, the Bears' quarterback, placed 7th in the overall 2013–14 Heisman race in New York, the second Heisman Trophy candidate set forth by Baylor in the last three record-breaking seasons. Petty was voted Big 12 Offensive Player of the Year following the season.

==== Assault scandal ====
From 2012 to 2016, Baylor was rocked by a sexual assault scandal which resulted in the dismissal of head coach Art Briles, as well as the resignations of Athletic Director Ian McCaw, the University President Kenneth Starr, and the Title IX coordinator Patty Crawford.

The Big 12 Conference conditionally withheld $6 million from Baylor's yearly payout until Baylor could certify changes were implemented. In March 2017, the Texas Ranger Division confirmed that it had begun a "preliminary investigation" into whether or not the university or Waco PD had broken any laws. On March 7, 2017, U.S. District Judge Robert L. Pitman dismissed several claims made in a lawsuit against the university while allowing others to proceed.

=== Jim Grobe era (2016) ===
Jim Grobe took over as interim head coach for Baylor and led them to their 7th straight bowl appearance and a 31–12 victory over highly favored Boise State (10–2 record) at the Cactus Bowl in Arizona. Baylor finished the season with a 7–6 record.

=== Matt Rhule era (2017–2019) ===
In December 2016 former Temple coach, Matt Rhule, was hired as the head Baylor football coach and given a 7-year contract. Rhule subsequently replaced all of the prior football coaches and support staff and completed the hiring process in February 2017.

Coach Rhule and the Bears suffered through a disastrous first season in 2017, finishing the year with a 1–11 record. A 38–9 victory on the road in week 10 over the Kansas Jayhawks was the lone win. The rest of the season was sprinkled with some positives, including a close loss vs No. 3 Oklahoma (49–41) and a 2-point loss to No. 23 West Virginia (38–36). In 2018 Coach Rhule led the Baylor Bears to one of the nations biggest 1 year turnaround seasons, going from 1 win to 7 wins after a thrilling Texas Bowl victory over Vanderbilt (45–38). Baylor finished the year with a 7–6 record but was close to having a very good season as 4 losses came on the road to top 20 competition (No. 6, No. 9, No. 13, No. 20). The 2019 season will go down as one of the best ever in Baylor football history. The Bears finished the regular season T-1st in the Big 12 with an 11–1 record, matching the program record for wins. The Bears played Oklahoma in the Big 12 Championship game but lost in a close, hard fought game. To finish the season, Baylor was ranked No. 7 in the CFP poll and was selected to play the No. 5 Georgia Bulldogs in the Sugar Bowl. They lost this game by a score of 14–26. On January 7, 2020, Rhule was hired as the head coach of the Carolina Panthers of the NFL, leaving Baylor after completely turning around the football program and its national perception.

=== Dave Aranda era (2020–2026) ===
In January 2020, after Rhule's departure for the Panthers, Baylor hired former LSU defensive coordinator Dave Aranda. In Aranda's first season, the team compiled a 2–7 record, with wins against Kansas (0–9) and Kansas State (4–6).

On December 4, 2021, Baylor held off an Oklahoma State rally to win the Big 12 Championship Game 21–16. Coach Dave Aranda took responsibility for a controversial decision to go for the first down on a 4th-and-1 at their own 36. The failed conversion triggered the Oklahoma State rally. However, Coach Aranda owned up to the call in a post-game interview, explaining that Baylor Football is about seizing opportunities when they are available; an attitude that ultimately won them the game. Oklahoma State had the ball at the Baylor 2-yard line with 1:19 to go. Baylor stopped them on 3 runs and a pass for one of the all-time great goal-line stands.

On October 25, 2026, Aranda was fired from Baylor following consecutive losses to TCU and Kansas. He finished his time at Baylor with a 40–40 overall record.

== Conference affiliations ==
Baylor has been independent and a member of two different conferences.

- Independent (1899–1914)
- Southwest Conference (1915–1995)
- Big 12 Conference (1996–present)

== Conference championships ==
Baylor has won ten conference championships, won in two different conferences, six outright and four shared.

Year	Conference	Coach	Overall record	Conference record
1915†	Southwest Conference	Charles Mosley	7–1	3–0
1916†	Southwest Conference	Charles Mosley	9–1	5–1
1922	Southwest Conference	Frank Bridges	8–3	5–0
1924	Southwest Conference	Frank Bridges	7–2–1	4–0–1
1974	Southwest Conference	Grant Teaff	8–4	6–1
1980	Southwest Conference	Grant Teaff	10–1	8–0
1994†	Southwest Conference	Chuck Reedy	7–4	4–3
2013	Big 12 Conference	Art Briles	11–2	8–1
2014†	Big 12 Conference	Art Briles	11–2	8–1
2021	Big 12 Conference	Dave Aranda	12–2	7–2

† Co-championship

== Bowl games ==
Baylor has played in 28 bowl games, garnering a record of 14–14. Baylor has appeared in 8 New Year's Day bowl games and 8 major bowl games.

Season	Coach	Bowl	Opponent	Result
1948	Bob Woodruff	Dixie Bowl	Wake Forest	W 20–7
1951	George Sauer	Orange Bowl	Georgia Tech	L 14–17
1954	George Sauer	Gator Bowl	Auburn	L 13–33
1956	Sam Boyd	Sugar Bowl	Tennessee	W 13–7
1960	John Bridgers	Gator Bowl	Florida	L 12–13
1961	John Bridgers	Gotham Bowl	Utah State	W 24–9
1963	John Bridgers	Bluebonnet Bowl	LSU	W 14–7
1974	Grant Teaff	Cotton Bowl Classic	Penn State	L 20–41
1979	Grant Teaff	Peach Bowl	Clemson	W 24–18
1980	Grant Teaff	Cotton Bowl Classic	Alabama	L 2–30
1983	Grant Teaff	Astro-Bluebonnet Bowl	Oklahoma State	L 14–24
1985	Grant Teaff	Liberty Bowl	LSU	W 21–7
1986	Grant Teaff	Bluebonnet Bowl	Colorado	W 21–9
1991	Grant Teaff	Copper Bowl	Indiana	L 0–24
1992	Grant Teaff	John Hancock Bowl	Arizona	W 20–15
1994	Chuck Reedy	Alamo Bowl	Washington State	L 3–10
2010	Art Briles	Texas Bowl	Illinois	L 14–38
2011	Art Briles	Alamo Bowl	Washington	W 67–56
2012	Art Briles	Holiday Bowl	UCLA	W 49–26
2013	Art Briles	Fiesta Bowl	UCF	L 42–52
2014	Art Briles	Cotton Bowl Classic †	Michigan State	L 41–42
2015	Art Briles	Russell Athletic Bowl	North Carolina	W 49–38
2016	Jim Grobe	Cactus Bowl	Boise State	W 31–12
2018	Matt Rhule	Texas Bowl	Vanderbilt	W 45–38
2019	Matt Rhule	Sugar Bowl †	Georgia	L 14–26
2021	Dave Aranda	Sugar Bowl †	Ole Miss	W 21–7
2022	Dave Aranda	Armed Forces Bowl	Air Force	L 15–30
2024	Dave Aranda	Texas Bowl	LSU	L 31–44

† New Year's Six bowl game

== Rivalries ==
=== SMU ===
SMU vs. Baylor is a storied college football rivalry, beginning in 1916 and then re-ignited in 2014 after a pause due to conference realignment. The SMU Mustangs and Baylor Bears had a long history in the Southwest Conference, which ended when Baylor moved to the Big 12. Both are prominent private universities in Texas, located 100 miles apart. Baylor leads the series 39–36–7.

=== Houston ===
Baylor's rivalry with Houston stems from their days playing each other in the old Southwest Conference, and the aftermath of its dissolution with many Houston fans feeling that inside politics is what kept them out of the inaugural Big 12. The two played each other for 20 years from 1976 to 1995, and the series is currently tied 15–15–1 following their recent encounter in the 2025 season.

=== Rice ===
The schools both reside 183 miles from each other within the U.S. state of Texas. From 1915 to 1995, the teams were members of the Southwest Conference (SWC) and met on an annual basis from 1924 to 1995 with the exception of 1943 and 1944 due to World War II. From 1924 to 1975, the game was played exclusively on either the fourth weekend in November or the first weekend in December as the regular season finale for both teams, except for 1963 when Baylor's scheduled game against SMU and Rice's scheduled game against TCU were moved back two weeks from November 23 due to the assassination of John F. Kennedy in Dallas on November 22. After the Southwest Conference added Houston as a full-time member in 1976, the annual game between the Bears and Owls was moved to the middle of November where it was played through 1995, with the exception of 1991 when the game was played in mid-October.

After the breakup of the SWC following the 1995 season, Baylor was among the four SWC schools invited to join the new Big 12 Conference while Rice was left out. This brought an end to the annual rivalry between the Bears and Owls, but the teams have faced off intermittently since that time, most recently in 2019. The 2016 meeting between the schools was notable for a controversial halftime performance of the Marching Owl Band, who formed a Roman numeral IX in a mocking reference to Title IX and the Baylor University sexual assault scandal. The Rice University administration apologized the next day for the gesture. However, as of May 2025, there are no plans for the teams to meet again on the football field.

=== TCU ===
Baylor's rivalry with TCU is one of the oldest and most played in all of college football. Dating back to 1899 the series began while TCU was located in Waco, Texas as a cross-town rival to Baylor. Due to the close proximity of the two schools 23 games were played between 1899 and 1910. A fire in 1910 destroyed the Main Building on the TCU campus and financial incentives from the city of Fort Worth convinced the board of trustees to relocate TCU to that city. There was a ten-year break in the series when the dissolution of the Southwest Conference in 1996 resulted in the two universities joining separate athletic conferences. The series resumed in Waco for Baylor's 2006 home opener and continued in 2007 in Fort Worth. TCU leads the series 59–54–7 through the conclusion of the 2024 season. In November 2023, the official name of the rivalry was changed to the "Bluebonnet Battle" to commemorate the rivalry becoming the longest-played rivalry in Texas.

=== Texas ===
Baylor and Texas have played each other 113 times, with the first game between Baylor and Texas being played in 1901. Only Oklahoma and Texas A&M have played Texas more times than Baylor. Both Baylor and Texas were founding members of the Southwest Conference and the Big 12 Conference. Texas leads the series with Baylor 81–28–4. However, starting in 2010 this rivalry intensified as Baylor established themselves as a major contender in the Big 12 Conference with Baylor playing for 4 Big 12 titles and winning 3, including a head-to-head win over Texas to clinch the Big 12 Championship in 2013, in what is now known as the "Ice Bowl". Baylor's 30–10 win over the Longhorns was Mack Brown's last regular season game as the head coach at Texas. With Texas departing the Big 12 to join the Southeastern Conference (SEC) in 2024, the future of the rivalry is uncertain beyond 2023. Since 2010, the Baylor vs Texas series is led by Texas 8–6.

=== Texas Tech ===
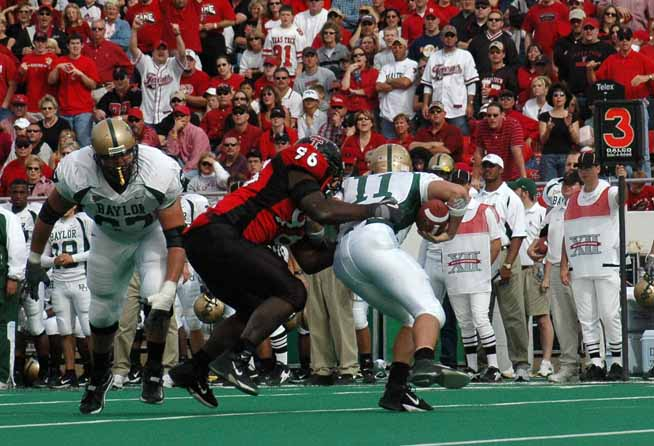
Baylor Bears and Texas Tech Red Raiders in action in 2004

The Baylor Bears are Texas Tech's most played opponent with 80 meetings between the teams dating back to 1929. From 2009 to 2018, the Bears played the Red Raiders at AT&T Stadium during the Saturday after Thanksgiving (with the exception of the 2010 game which was played at the Cotton Bowl during the State Fair of Texas). Starting with the 2019 season, the series moved back to the two schools respective on campus stadiums with Baylor hosting in Waco in 2019 and Texas Tech hosting in Lubbock in 2020. As of the conclusion of the 2024 season, Baylor leads the overall series 42–40–1.

=== Texas A&M ===
Texas A&M is one of Baylor's oldest rivals as the series dates from 1899 and the two schools are located only 90 miles apart on the Brazos River. The competitive peak of the series was from 1960 to 1990 when Baylor won 13 games, A&M won 16 games and 2 games ended in ties. During that time 18 games were decided by 7 points or fewer. The game played in 2011 is likely the end of the series for the foreseeable future given A&M's decision to leave the Big 12 Conference. Texas A&M leads the series 68–31–9 with the most recent game played in 2011.

== Facilities ==
=== Stadium ===
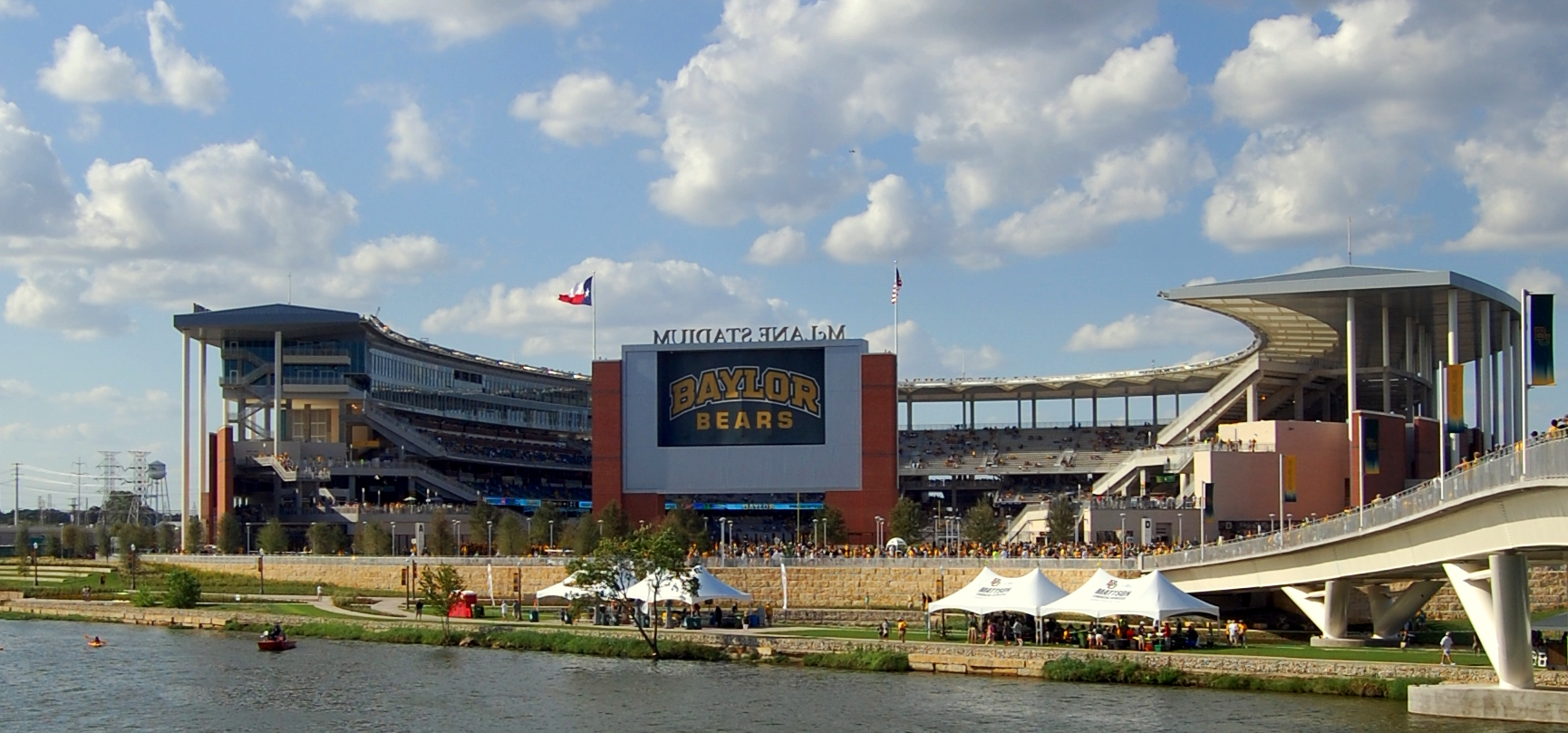
McLane Stadium before its inaugural Baylor game.

The Baylor Bears had played their home games at Floyd Casey Stadium, originally known as Baylor Stadium, since the facility opened in 1950 till closure in 2013. Construction began on what would become Floyd Casey Stadium right after World War II in 1948. The stadium cost $1.8 million to construct and was placed on land donated by a local Baylor landowner. It opened under the name Baylor Stadium in 1950 with a game against Houston, won by Baylor 34–7. When finished the new stadium was the second largest football stadium in the state of Texas. Floyd Casey Stadium had a seating capacity of 50,000 and had undergone multiple renovations during its lifetime, most recently in 2009.

Prior to the Bears time at Floyd Casey Stadium, the Bears played at Municipal Stadium (1936–1949), Cotton Palace (1926–1929), on campus at Carroll Field (1906–1925 and 1930–1935). As of the 2012 season Carroll Field has been the only on-campus homefield for the Bears.

In the Fall of 2012, Baylor University began construction of a new $266 million stadium on the north bank of the Brazos River. The stadium opened for the 2014 football season with the first game taking place on August 31, 2014, against former Southwest Conference rival Southern Methodist University (SMU). The new McLane Stadium was named after Drayton McLane Jr. who donated a significant amount of money toward the stadium's construction. McLane Stadium is the largest construction project in the history of Waco and Central Texas, and has brought increased revenue to the downtown Waco area. Although McLane Stadium is smaller in capacity than its predecessor, Floyd Casey Stadium, it is expandable to up to 55,000 seats.

=== Simpson Athletics and Academic Center ===
The Simpson Center was built in 2009 and provides a 97,000 foot facility to house football operations. The building also houses the 13,500 foot football weight room. The building is built in a classic collegiate style matching the red brick southern architectural style of the Baylor University campus and is over three stories tall. It houses the main athletic training room, football team locker room, equipment room, coach's locker room, and a large primary weight room. The Simpson Center also houses academic support rooms for studying and academic work. Equipment for sports and athletic rehabilitation include the new state of the art underwater treadmills built into the Simpson Center.

=== Jay and Jenny Allison Indoor Football Practice Facility ===
The indoor practice facility is a full football field and A/C building that allows Baylor athletics to practice in all weather conditions year round. The Indoor facility was a gift from longtime Baylor letterwinner and successful businessman Jay Allison along with his wife Jenny. The new state of the art indoor field was designed to be a part of the Highers Athletic Complex and backs up to the Brazos river. The building was built in 2010 for an estimated cost of $15.4 million.

== Top 25 poll finishes ==
The Bears have finished in the final season rankings of the AP Poll or Coaches Poll 18 times. The AP Poll first appeared in 1934, and has been published continuously since 1936. The Coaches Poll began its ranking with 20 teams in 1950–51 season, but expanded to 25 teams beginning in the 1990–91 season. The College Football Playoff rankings were used from 2014 to 2023 for a four-team knockout tournament to determine a national champion; a 12-team playoff was used beginning in 2024.

Season	AP rank	Coaches rank	CFP rank
1949	20	—	
1950	—	15	
1951	9	9	
1954	18	—	
1956	11	11	
1960	12	11	
1963	—	20	
1974	14	14	
1976	—	19	
1979	14	15	
1980	14	13	
1985	17	15	
1986	12	13	
2011	13	12	
2013	13	13	
2014	7	8	5
2015	13	13	17
2019	13	12	7
2021	5	6	7

== Hall of Fame ==
A total of two Baylor coaches and eight Baylor players have been inducted into the College Football Hall of Fame to date.

=== College Football Hall of Fame inductees ===
Player	Position	Tenure at Baylor	Induction year
Morley Jennings	Coach	1926–1940	1973
Barton Koch	G	1928–1930	1974
Jim Ray Smith	T	1950–1953	1987
Bill Glass	DE	1954–1956	1985
Larry Elkins	WR	1963–1964	1994
Mike Singletary	LB	1977–1980	1995
Grant Teaff	Coach	1972–1992	2001
Thomas Everett	FS	1985–1987	2006
Don Trull	QB	1961–1963	2013

=== Pro Football Hall of Fame players ===
Player	Position	Career	Induction
Mike Singletary	LB	1981–1992	1998

== Heisman Trophy ==
Baylor has had four Heisman Trophy candidates, an award given to the best player in college football. The first and only candidate to-date that has won the trophy was Robert Griffin III in 2011.

Year	Player	Place	Votes
1951	Larry Isbell	7th	618
1963	Don Trull	4th	970
2011	Robert Griffin III	1st	1,687
2013	Bryce Petty	7th	127
2014	Bryce Petty	10th	14

== Traditions ==
=== Baylor Line ===
The Baylor Line is one of the first aspects of Baylor spirit to which freshmen are introduced. Freshmen students wear a gold football jersey with the number of their expected graduation year and a chosen nickname on the back.

Before each football game the Baylor Line gathers at one end of McLane Stadium and waits for the signal to make a 'mad dash' down the field to create a giant human tunnel through which the football team runs through to enter the stadium. Six members of the Baylor Line carry flags with the letters B-A-Y-L-O-R while the rest of the Line runs behind them. Afterwards students rush the sidelines and stand in an exclusive Baylor Line section behind the opponents' bench where students watch the game, cheer the Bears to another victory, and heckle the opposing team.

At its inception, the Baylor Line was an all-male freshmen organization who lined the front of Baylor's student section for the express purpose of protecting Baylor women from visiting fans. In 1993, the group became co-ed and a more expansive Baylor tradition.

The jersey colors of the Line originally rotated between green in odd numbered years and gold in even numbered years through 1998 (class of 2002). This changed to green every year until around 2001 when the decision was made to use a more distinct-looking gold color every year. The green jerseys are now used for members of the Baylor University Chamber of Commerce who lead the Baylor Line in chants; these jerseys have "CC" on the back instead of a graduation year.

=== Mascots ===
Baylor keeps two American black bears, Indy and Belle, on campus in their natural habitat enclosure as mascots for the university. American black bears roamed the majority of Texas in considerable abundance when Baylor was founded in 1845, and bears could still be found throughout many areas of the state until the 1940s. The university has had live bears since 1915. The first live bear was a gift from Herbert Mayr, a local businessman who won the bear in a poker game from a member of the troops of the 107th Engineers, which was a unit of the 32nd Infantry Division stationed at Camp MacArthur in Waco. The soldiers were based in the city during World War I. The Bears used to be brought to the stadium by the Baylor Chamber spirit group on game days. This changed in 2010 when the USDA informed Baylor officials that they would no longer be permitted to bring the bears to games per Federal Code of Regulations. While the live bears are no longer allowed at football games, they remain a beloved tradition of campus life.

=== Alma mater ===
Before kickoff and after each game Baylor fans sing the university alma mater 'That Good Old Baylor Line' while holding their "Bear claws" in the air. The tune is set to the 1949 classic "In the Good Old Summertime."

== Logos and uniforms ==
The traditional Baylor uniform worn for home games consists of a gold helmet with a green interlocking BU logo on the sides and green & white stripes down the middle, green jersey, and white or gold pants; a white jersey is substituted for the green one for road games. In recent seasons, both a matte green helmet and a white helmet have been used as alternates to the gold helmet. Black jerseys as well as black or green pants have also been used giving the Bears multiple uniform combinations to choose from.

On August 11, 2014, the Baylor Bears won the online fan vote for college football's best uniform awarded by Sporting News Magazine.

In 2019, Baylor university updated their athletic marks across all sports, including football. This included an updated primary interlocking "BU" logo, as well as a new proprietary number font and alternate bear head logo. The football uniforms were updated with the new font for the numbers, primary logo on the helmet, and an inclusion of the bear head logo on the collar.

Baylor wore a camouflage helmet against Buffalo in 2010 remembrance of the September 11 attacks and to commemorate the armed forces of the United States

== Awards ==
=== National ===
- Heisman Trophy
  Most Outstanding Player
  Robert Griffin III, Winner-2011
- Biletnikoff Award
  Best Receiver
  Corey Coleman, Winner-2015
  Terrance Williams, Finalist-2012 (finished 2nd)
- Campbell Trophy
  Academic Heisman
  Nick Florence, Finalist-2012 (finished 2nd)
- Davey O'Brien Memorial Trophy
  Best SWC Player
  Mike Singletary, Winner-1979, 1980
- Davey O'Brien National Quarterback Award
  Best Quarterback
  Robert Griffin III, Winner-2011
  Nick Florence, semifinalist-2012
- Outland Trophy
  Best Interior Lineman
  Cyril Richardson, Finalist-2013
  Spencer Drango, Finalist-2015
- Chic Harley Award
  College Football Player of the Year
  Robert Griffin III, Winner-2011
- Sammy Baugh Trophy
  Top Passer
  Don Trull, Winner-1962, 1963
- AFCA Coach of the Year
  Best Coach
  Grant Teaff, Winner-1974
- Jim Thorpe Award
  Top Defensive Back
  Thomas Everett, Winner-1986
- Ray Guy Award
  Best Punter
  Daniel Sepulveda, Winner-2004, 2006
- The Jim Parker Trophy
  Top Offensive Lineman
  Cyril Richardson, Winner-2013
- Manning Award
  Best Quarterback
  Robert Griffin III, Winner-2011/2012
- Associated Press College Football Player of the Year
  Most Outstanding Player
  Robert Griffin III, Winner-2011
- Earl Campbell Tyler Rose Award
  Top Offensive Player
  Bryce Petty, Winner-2013
- AT&T ESPN All-America Player of the Year
  College Football Player of the Year
  Robert Griffin III, Winner-2011
- Sporting News College Football Player of the Year
  College Football Player of the Year
  Robert Griffin III, Winner-2011

=== Conference ===
- Southwest Conference Coach of the Year

Grant Teaff, 1974 & 1978

- Southwest Conference Player of the Year

Mike Singletary, 1979 & 1980
Thomas Everett, 1986 & 1987

- Big 12 Conference Coach of the Year

Art Briles, 2013
Dave Aranda, 2021

- Big 12 Special Teams Player of the Year

Daniel Sepulveda, 2006
Trestan Ebner, 2021

- Big 12 Conference Athlete of the Year

Robert Griffin III, 2011–2012

- Big 12 Conference Freshman of the Year

Robert Griffin III, 2008

- Big 12 Conference Offensive Player of the Year

Robert Griffin III, 2011
Bryce Petty, 2013

- Big 12 Conference Defensive Player of the Year

James Lynch, 2019
Jalen Pitre, 2021

- Big 12 Conference Offensive Newcomer of the Year

Lache Seastrunk, 2012

- Big 12 Conference Defensive Newcomer of the Year

Siaki Ika, 2021

- Big 12 Conference Offensive Lineman of the Year

Cyril Richardson, 2012 & 2013
Spencer Drango, 2014 & 2015
Connor Galvin, 2021

- Big 12 Conference Defensive Lineman of the Year

Andrew Billings, 2015
James Lynch, 2019

- Big 12 Conference Scholar-Athlete of the Year

Nick Florence, 2012

== Bears in the NFL ==
As of October 18, 2021, 12 former Baylor players were listed on NFL rosters:

- Andrew Billings, DT, Cleveland Browns
- Henry Black, S, Green Bay Packers
- Kyle Fuller, C, Seattle Seahawks
- Xavien Howard, CB, Miami Dolphins
- Clay Johnston, LB, Carolina Panthers
- Blake Lynch, LB, Minnesota Vikings
- James Lynch, DT, Minnesota Vikings
- Ross Matiscik, LS, Jacksonville Jaguars
- Denzel Mims, WR, New York Jets
- Bravvion Roy, DT, Carolina Panthers
- Sam Tecklenburg, C, Carolina Panthers
- Jon Weeks, LS, Houston Texans

== Consensus All-Americans ==
- 1930 Barton Koch, G
- 1956 Bill Glass, G
- 1963 Lawrence Elkins, E
- 1964 Lawrence Elkins, B
- 1976 Gary Green, DB
- 1979 Mike Singletary, LB
- 1980 Mike Singletary, LB
- 1986 Thomas Everett, DB
- 1991 Santana Dotson, DL
- 2006 Daniel Sepulveda, P
- 2011 Robert Griffin III, QB
- 2012 Terrance Williams, WR
- 2013 Cyril Richardson, OL
- 2014 Spencer Drango, OL
- 2015 Spencer Drango, OL
- 2015 Corey Coleman, WR
- 2019 James Lynch, DL
- 2021 Jalen Pitre, S

== Future non-conference opponents ==
Announced schedules as of May 29, 2026.

2026	2027	2028	2029	2030
vs Auburn (Mercedes-Benz Stadium, Atlanta)	Incarnate Word	North Texas	at North Texas	vs Louisiana Tech (Shreveport, LA)
Prairie View A&M	at Maryland	Maryland		
Louisiana Tech	at Air Force			

- Future home game against SMU will be rescheduled at a later date.
