= 1930 All-Southwest Conference football team =

American college football all-star team

The 1930 All-Southwest Conference football team consists of American football players chosen by various organizations for All-Southwest Conference teams for the 1930 college football season. The selectors for the 1930 season included the Associated Press (AP).

== All Southwest selections ==
=== Backs ===
- Jake Wilson, Baylor (AP-1 [QB])
- Dexter Shelley, Texas (AP-1 [HB])
- Harrison Stafford, Texas (AP-1 [HB])
- Ernie Koy, Texas (AP-1 [FB])

=== Ends ===
- Louis Long, SMU (AP-1)
- Adrian Tracy, Texas A&M (AP-1)

=== Tackles ===
- Ox Blanton, Texas (AP-1)
- Ben Boswell, TCU (AP-1)

=== Guards ===
- Barton Koch, Baylor (AP-1)
- Bill Morgan, Rice (AP-1)

=== Centers ===
- Noble Atkins, TCU (AP-1)

== Key ==
AP = Associated Press

== See also ==
- 1930 College Football All-America Team
