= Andrew Billings =

American football player (born 1995)

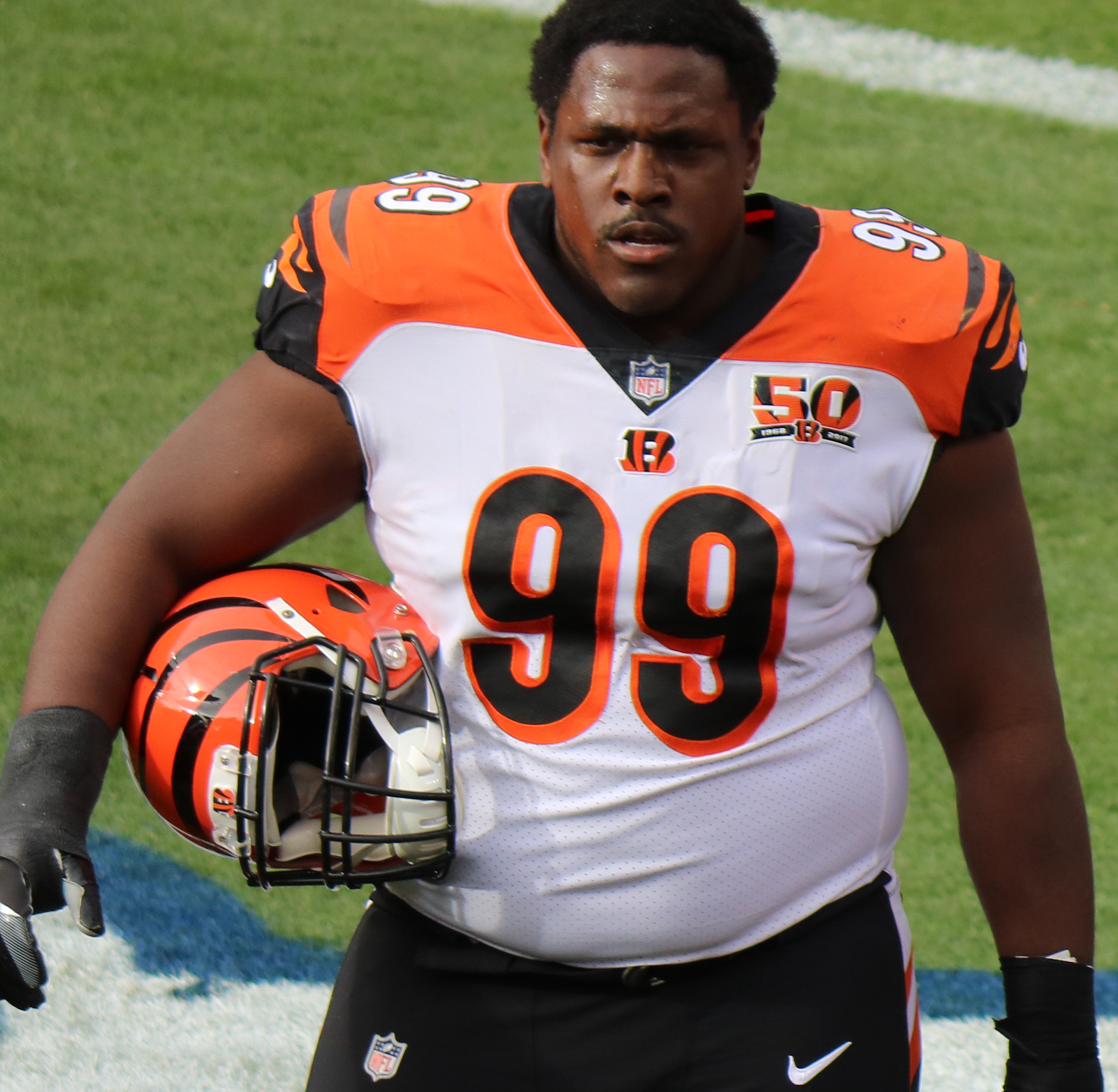
- Billings with the Cincinnati Bengals in 2017

No. 95 – Arizona Cardinals
- Position: Nose tackle
- Roster status: Active

Personal information
- Born: March 6, 1995 (age 31); Waco, Texas, U.S.
- Listed height: 6 ft 1 in (1.85 m)
- Listed weight: 340 lb (154 kg)

Career information
- High school: Waco
- College: Baylor (2013–2015)
- NFL draft: 2016: 4th round, 122nd overall pick

Career history
- Cincinnati Bengals (2016–2019); Cleveland Browns (2020–2021); Miami Dolphins (2021)*; Kansas City Chiefs (2021)*; Las Vegas Raiders (2022); Chicago Bears (2023–2025); Arizona Cardinals (2026–present)
- * Offseason or practice squad member only

Awards and highlights
- Big 12 Co-Defensive Player of the Year (2015); Big 12 Defensive Lineman of the Year (2015); 2× First-team All-Big 12 (2014, 2015)

Career NFL statistics as of Week 5, 2026
- Total tackles: 193
- Sacks: 6.5
- Forced fumbles: 1
- Stats at Pro Football Reference

Andrew Mitchell Billings (born March 6, 1995) is an American professional football nose tackle for the Arizona Cardinals of the National Football League (NFL). He played college football for the Baylor Bears and was selected by the Cincinnati Bengals in the fourth round of the 2016 NFL draft.

== Early life ==
Billings attended Waco High School in Waco, Texas. He was rated by Rivals.com as a four-star recruit and committed to Baylor University to play college football. Billings also competed in powerlifting during high school and broke Mark Henry's Texas record with 2,010 pounds. The record was set with an 805-pound squat, 500-pound bench press, and a 705-pound dead lift.

== College career ==
As a true freshman at Baylor in 2013, Billings played in 11 games and made two starts while recording 29 total tackles. As a sophomore in 2014, he started all 13 games and was named 1st Team All-Big 12 Conference after recording 37 tackles and two sacks. In his 2015 junior season, he started in 12 games, posting career highs in total tackles (39), solo tackles (31), tackles for loss (14), and sacks (5.5). His efforts earned him Big 12 Co-Defensive Player of the Year (shared with Emmanuel Ogbah), Big 12 Defensive Lineman of the Year, and 1st Team All-Big 12 Conference honors. Billings finished his college career with 106 total tackles, 14 tackles for loss, 8 sacks, and 2 forced fumbles.

== Professional career ==
=== Pre-draft ===
As a top defensive tackle prospect, Billings chose to forego his senior season and would receive an invitation to the NFL Combine. He attended the combine and completed all of the required combine drills. Fox Sports listed him as one of their top five biggest winners from the combine and his performance was perceived well overall by scouts for his display of raw strength coupled with exceptional quickness and speed for a man of his size. On March 16, 2016, Billings participated at Baylor's Pro Day along with Corey Coleman, Shawn Oakman, Spencer Drango, Xavien Howard, Grant Campbell, LaQuan McGowan, Jimmy Landes, and seven other teammates. A record 61 team representatives and scouts from all 32 NFL teams attended Baylor's pro day, including general manager Kevin Colbert (Pittsburgh Steelers) and head coaches Mike Tomlin (Steelers) and Bill O'Brien (Houston Texans). Billings performed well and chose to run the 40-yard dash (4.96), 20-yard dash (2.89), 10-yard dash (1.76), short shuttle (4.78), and three-cone drill (7.74) and decreased his times from the combine in all of them. At the conclusion of the pre-draft process, Billings was projected to be a late-first- or second-round pick. He was ranked the third-best defensive tackle prospect in the draft by ESPN, the sixth-best defensive tackle by NFLDraftScout.com and NFL analyst Mike Mayock, and was ranked the seventh-best defensive lineman by Sports Illustrated. He drew major interest and was linked to the Green Bay Packers, Washington Redskins, Steelers, and Minnesota Vikings.

Pre-draft measurables
Height	Weight	Arm length	Hand span	Wingspan	40-yard dash	10-yard split	20-yard split	20-yard shuttle	Three-cone drill	Vertical jump	Broad jump	Bench press
6 ft 0 5/8 in (1.84 m)	311 lb (141 kg)	33 in (0.84 m)	10 in (0.25 m)	6 ft 7 in (2.01 m)	4.96 s	1.76 s	2.89 s	4.77 s	7.77 s	27.5 in (0.70 m)	9 ft 5 in (2.87 m)	31 reps
All values from NFL Combine and Baylor Pro Day

=== Cincinnati Bengals ===
==== 2016 ====
The Cincinnati Bengals selected Billings in the fourth round (122nd overall) of the 2016 NFL draft. He was the 16th defensive tackle selected in 2016. His fall in the draft was greatly unexpected as no teams gave any indications of it prior to the draft. He was projected as a first rounder in multiple mock drafts by Pro Football Focus and NFL analysts Todd McShay and Mel Kiper Jr. There were many speculations that ranged from his lack of height and size for his position and a possible knee injury. Bengals head coach Marvin Lewis said "I think his height maybe was restrictive in some ways for some people at times but we've done pretty well these guys." Billings stated in regards to his fall in the draft, "This is something I'm going to carry with me my whole life." "It's actually a good thing for me." He drew comparisons, by multiple media outlets, to teammate Geno Atkins and his equally unexpected slide in the draft during the 2010 NFL draft.

On May 18, 2016, the Bengals signed Billings to a four-year, $2.87 million contract that included a signing bonus of $535,845.

He competed with Domata Peko, Pat Sims, and DeShawn Williams throughout training camp for the starting nose tackle position. On August 10, 2016, he was carted off the field during the Bengals' practice after suffering a knee injury. On August 15, he underwent surgery to repair a torn meniscus and was placed on injured reserve for the entirety of the season. The Cincinnati Bengals later lost another rookie (William Jackson III) for the entire 2016.

==== 2017 ====
Billings competed with Pat Sims, DeShawn Williams, and Josh Tupou throughout training camp for the vacant starting nose tackle position left by the departure of Domata Peko to the Denver Broncos during free agency. Head coach Marvin Lewis named him the backup nose tackle to Pat Sims to begin the regular season.

He made his professional regular season debut in the Bengals' season-opener against the Baltimore Ravens and recorded one solo tackle in their 20–0 loss. On November 24, 2017, Billings earned his first career start against the Tennessee Titans in place of Sims who had injured his calf the previous week. Billings recorded a season-high four combined tackles in the Bengals' 24–20 loss. Throughout the first seven games he played in 59 total defensive snaps and earned 48 defensive snaps against the Titans.

=== Cleveland Browns ===
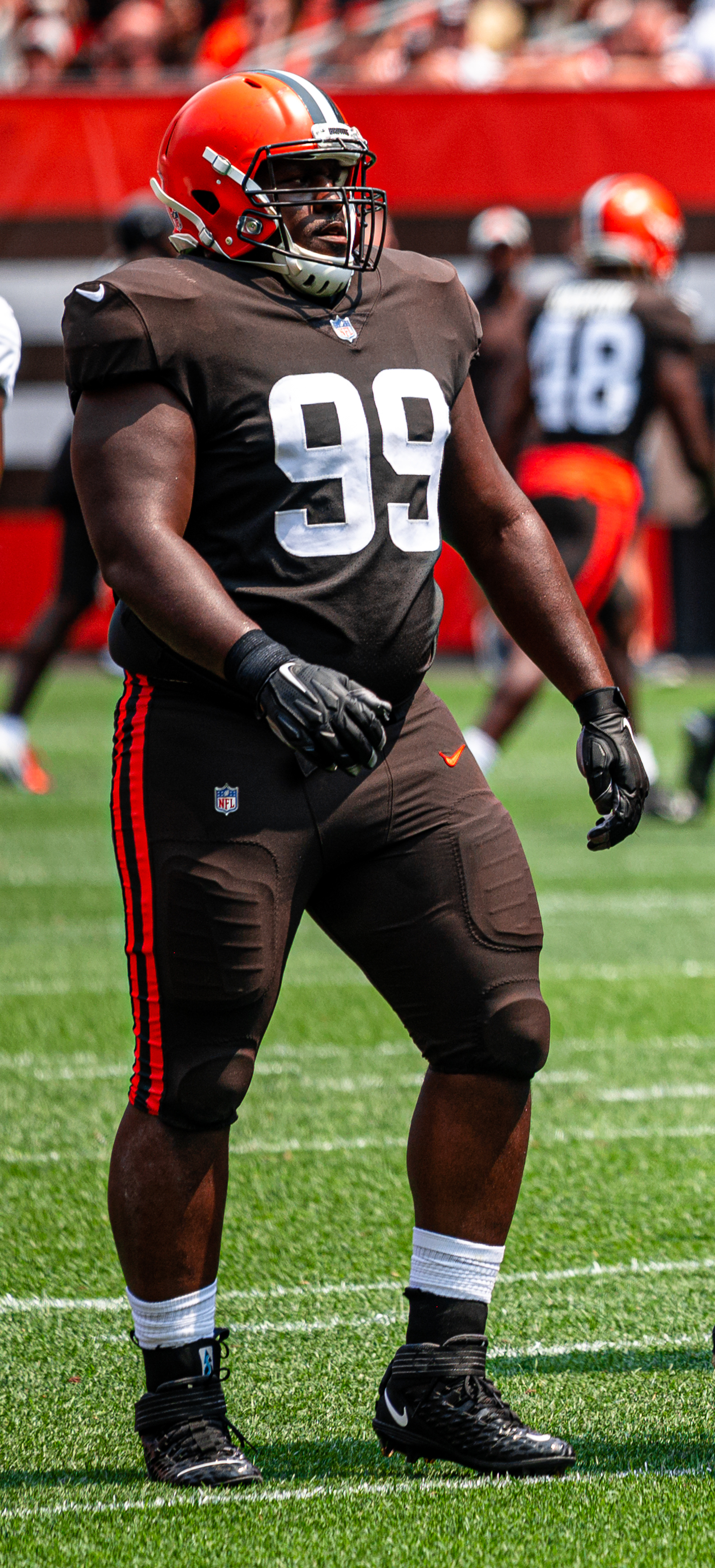
Billings with the Cleveland Browns in 2021

On March 26, 2020, Billings signed with the Cleveland Browns. He chose to opt-out of the 2020 season due to the COVID-19 pandemic on August 4, 2020.

Billings was waived by the Browns on November 13, 2021.

=== Miami Dolphins ===
On November 16, 2021, Billings was signed to the practice squad of the Miami Dolphins.

=== Kansas City Chiefs ===
On January 19, 2022, Billings was signed to the Kansas City Chiefs' practice squad.

=== Las Vegas Raiders ===
On February 27, 2022, Billings signed with the Las Vegas Raiders. He started all 14 games he played in and notched a career best 39 total tackles.

=== Chicago Bears ===
On March 16, 2023, Billings signed with the Chicago Bears. On November 2, Billings signed a two-year contract extension worth $8.5 million, with $6 million guaranteed. He started all 17 games for the Bears during the 2023 Season at defensive tackle.

On September 15, 2024, Billings collected his first career forced fumble, using his helmet to knock the football out of the hands of Houston Texans running back Cam Akers. On November 7, Billings was placed on injured reserve after undergoing surgery to repair a torn pectoral muscle.

=== Arizona Cardinals ===
On March 16, 2026, Billings signed a one-year, $2.4 million contract with the Arizona Cardinals.

== NFL career statistics ==
Legend
**Bold**	Career high

=== Regular season ===
Year	Team	Games		Tackles					Interceptions						Fumbles			
Year	Team	GP	GS	Cmb	Solo	Ast	Sack	TFL	Int	Yds	Avg	Lng	TD	PD	FF	FR	Yds	TD
2017	CIN	15	7	13	9	4	0.0	2	0	0	0.0	0	0	0	0	0	0	0
2018	CIN	16	16	32	**22**	10	**2.5**	**8**	0	0	0.0	0	0	0	0	0	0	0
2019	CIN	16	14	35	18	17	1.0	4	0	0	0.0	0	0	0	0	0	0	0
2020	CLE	Opted Out During COVID-19 Pandemic																
2021	CLE	6	0	1	0	1	0.0	0	0	0	0.0	0	0	0	0	0	0	0
2022	LV	14	14	**39**	18	**21**	1.0	3	0	0	0.0	0	0	0	0	0	0	0
2023	CHI	17	17	27	12	15	0.0	3	0	0	0.0	0	0	0	0	0	0	0
2024	CHI	8	8	13	9	4	1.0	2	0	0	0.0	0	0	0	**1**	0	0	0
2025	CHI	17	14	31	19	12	1.0	6	0	0	0.0	0	0	0	0	0	0	0
Career		109	90	191	107	84	6.5	28	0	0	0.0	0	0	0	1	0	0	0

=== Postseason ===
Year	Team	Games		Tackles					Interceptions						Fumbles			
Year	Team	GP	GS	Cmb	Solo	Ast	Sack	TFL	Int	Yds	Avg	Lng	TD	PD	FF	FR	Yds	TD
2025	CHI	2	2	3	1	2	0.0	0	0	0	0.0	0	0	0	0	0	0	0
Career		2	2	3	1	2	0.0	0	0	0	0.0	0	0	0	0	0	0	0
