= 1929 All-Southwest Conference football team =

American college football all-star team

The 1929 All-Southwest Conference football team consists of American football players chosen by various organizations for All-Southwest Conference teams for the 1929 college football season. The selectors for the 1929 season included the Associated Press (AP).

== All Southwest selections ==
=== Backs ===
- Howard Grubbs, TCU (AP-1 [QB])
- Leland, TCU (AP-1 [HB])
- Wilson, Baylor (AP-1 [HB])
- Deck Shelley, Texas (AP-1 [FB])

=== Ends ===
- Al Rose, Texas (AP-1)
- Wear Schoonover, Arkansas (AP-1)

=== Tackles ===
- Marion Hammon, SMU (AP-1)
- Mike Brumbelow, TCU (AP-1)

=== Guards ===
- Barton Koch, Baylor (AP-1)
- Choc Sanders, SMU (AP-1)

=== Centers ===
- Noble Atkins, TCU (AP-1)

== Key ==
AP = Associated Press

== See also ==
- 1929 College Football All-America Team
