= 1932 All-Southwest Conference football team =

American college football all-star team

The 1932 All-Southwest Conference football team consists of American football players chosen by various organizations for All-Southwest Conference teams for the 1932 college football season. The selectors for the 1932 season included the Associated Press (AP).

== All Southwest selections ==
=== Backs ===
- Blanard Spearman, TCU (AP-1 [QB])
- Bohn Hillard, Texas (AP-1 [HB])
- Harrison Stafford, Texas (AP-1 [HB])
- Ernie Koy, Texas (AP-1 [FB])

=== Ends ===
- Frank James, Baylor (AP-1)
- Madison Pruitt, TCU (AP-1)

=== Tackles ===
- Ben Boswell, TCU (AP-1)
- Foster Howell, TCU (AP-1)

=== Guards ===
- Lon Evans, TCU (AP-1)
- Johnny Vaught, TCU (AP-1)

=== Centers ===
- J. W. Townsend, TCU (AP-1)

== Key ==
AP = Associated Press, selected by 23 conference sports editors and writers

== See also ==
- 1932 College Football All-America Team
