= Harrison Stafford =

American football player (1912-2004)

Harry Stafford
- Stafford in 1934

No. 20
- Positions: Halfback, wingback, defensive back

Personal information
- Born: June 18, 1912; Wharton, Texas, U.S.
- Died: November 23, 2004 (aged 92); Edna, Texas, U.S.
- Listed height: 5 ft 11 in (1.80 m)
- Listed weight: 205 lb (93 kg)

Career information
- High school: Wharton (TX)
- College: Texas

Career history
- New York Giants (1934)

Awards and highlights
- NFL champion (1934); Second-team All-American (1932); 2× First-team All-SWC (1930, 1932)

Career statistics
- Games played: 6
- Starts: 3
- Receptions: 4
- Yards receiving: 70 (17.5 average)
- Rush attempts: 4
- Yards rushing: 4 (1.0 average)
- Stats at Pro Football Reference
- College Football Hall of Fame

Albert Harrison "Harry" Stafford (June 18, 1912 – November 23, 2004) was an American football halfback in the National Football League (NFL) for the New York Giants. He was inducted to the College Football Hall of Fame in 1975 after a stellar college career at the University of Texas.

After playing the 1931 and 1932 seasons withe Texas, Stafford transferred to West Point and attempted to make the squad in 1933 with Army, but failed to make the grade academically so in 1934 he pursued a career in professional football. Stafford played only one season in the NFL, starting three games for the New York Giants.
