= Ben Boswell =

American football player (1910–1968)

Profile
- Position: Offensive lineman

Personal information
- Born: March 4, 1910; Fort Worth, Texas, U.S.
- Died: May 30, 1968 (aged 58)

Career information
- College: Texas Christian

Career history
- 1933: Portsmouth Spartans
- 1934: Boston Redskins

Awards and highlights
- 2× First-team All-SWC (1930, 1932)
- Stats at Pro Football Reference

Benjamin F. Boswell (March 4, 1910 – May 30, 1968) was an American football offensive lineman in the National Football League (NFL) for the Portsmouth Spartans and Boston Redskins. Born in Fort Worth, Texas, he played college football at Texas Christian University.
