= Spencer Drango =

American football player (born 1992)

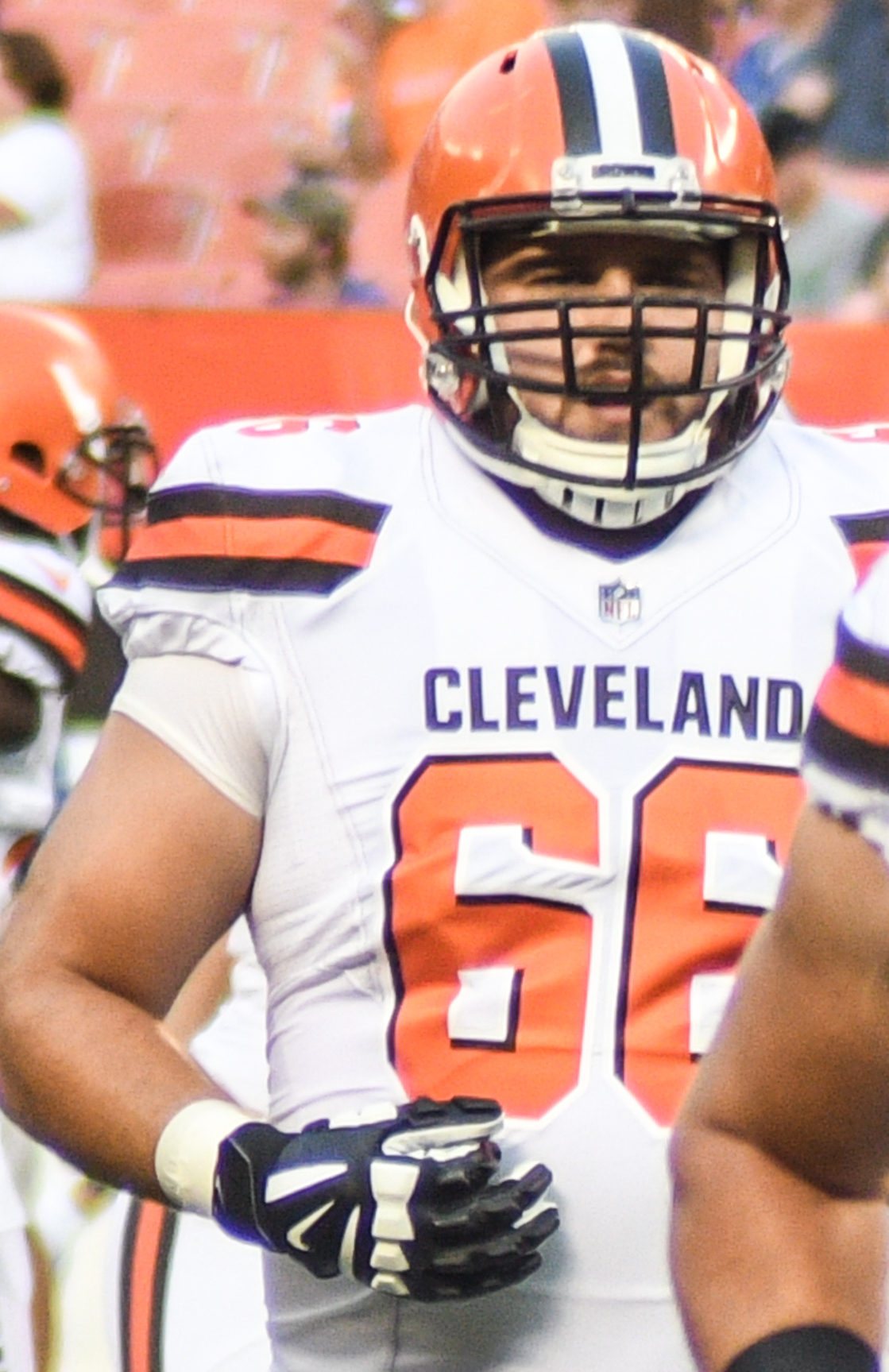
- Drango with the Cleveland Browns in 2017

No. 66, 74
- Position: Offensive guard / tackle

Personal information
- Born: October 15, 1992 (age 34); Indianapolis, Indiana, U.S.
- Listed height: 6 ft 6 in (1.98 m)
- Listed weight: 315 lb (143 kg)

Career information
- High school: Cedar Park (Cedar Park, Texas)
- College: Baylor (2011–2015)
- NFL draft: 2016: 5th round, 168th overall pick

Career history
- Cleveland Browns (2016–2017); Los Angeles Chargers (2018–2019)

Awards and highlights
- 2× Consensus All-American (2014, 2015); 2× Big 12 Offensive Lineman of the Year (2014, 2015); 3× First-team All-Big 12 (2013, 2014, 2015); Freshman All-American (2012)

Career NFL statistics
- Games played: 32
- Games started: 19
- Stats at Pro Football Reference

Spencer Joseph Drango (born October 15, 1992) is an American former professional football player who was an offensive lineman in the National Football League (NFL). He played college football for the Baylor Bears. A Freshman All-American in 2012, Drango was considered one of the best offensive tackles in his class. He was selected by the Cleveland Browns in the fifth round of the 2016 NFL draft.

== Early life ==
A native of Austin, Texas, Drango attended Cedar Park High School, where he was an All-State offensive lineman. As senior, he registered 144 knockdowns while not allowing a sack, helping Cedar Park to a 13–1 record and UIL quarterfinals, where they lost 21–20 to Michael Brewer's Austin Lake Travis.

Regarded as a four-star recruit by Rivals.com, Drango was listed as the No. 23 offensive tackle prospect in 2011. He picked Baylor over offers from Arkansas, Louisiana State, Stanford, and Texas.

== College career ==
After redshirting his initial year at Baylor, Drango took over from Cyril Richardson as starting left tackle for the Bears in 2012. He started all 13 games and was named Freshman All-American by Scout/FoxSports (first-team) and Phil Steele (second-team).

Midway through his sophomore season, Drango had back surgery for a ruptured disk, but Baylor athletic trainer Jacob Puente helped him recover so he could play football once again.

In his senior year, Drango had the highest pass-blocking efficiency in college football according to Pro Football Focus. He allowed only three quarterback hurries, and just a single quarterback hit—against Oklahoma State defensive end Emmanuel Ogbah—all season, giving him a nation-leading 99.2 pass blocking efficiency.

== Professional career ==
=== Pre-draft ===
Coming out of college, Drango was projected to go anywhere from the fourth to the seventh round by NFL analysts. NFLDraftScout.com ranked him the 19th best guard in the 2016 NFL draft. He played in the Senior Bowl and reportedly met with representatives from the Chicago Bears. While teams were fond of his upper body strength, ability to play in space, quality pass protection technique, and his quality setup in pass sets many pegged him as an eventual NFL backup or low-end starter with sloppy hand placement during blocks with a predictable punch in pass protection. He attended the NFL Scouting Combine and put up decent numbers in the positional drills and workouts. At Baylor's annual Pro Day, he decided to stand on his combine numbers and only participate in positional drills. 61 scouts and representatives, including Pittsburgh Steelers head coach Mike Tomlin and Houston Texans head coach Bill O'Brien, from all 32 NFL teams came to watch Drango, Corey Coleman, Shawn Oakman, Xavien Howard, Andrew Billings, and 11 other prospects workout. Although Drango was a top 10 tackle at Baylor each of the past two seasons, almost all analysts pegged him as an offensive guard in the NFL.

Pre-draft measurables
Height	Weight	Arm length	Hand span	40-yard dash	10-yard split	20-yard split	20-yard shuttle	Three-cone drill	Broad jump	Bench press
6 ft 5 5/8 in (1.97 m)	315 lb (143 kg)	33 3/4 in (0.86 m)	9 1/2 in (0.24 m)	5.27 s	1.85 s	3.06 s	4.66 s	7.88 s	8 ft 4 in (2.54 m)	30 reps
All values from NFL Combine

=== Cleveland Browns ===
Drango was drafted by the Cleveland Browns in the fifth round (168th overall) in the 2016 NFL Draft. On May 13, he signed a four-year contract worth about $2.55 million, which included a signing bonus worth about $207,000. Drango began training camp practicing at right guard but was immediately moved to right tackle and competed with rookie Shon Coleman for the backup right tackle position behind Austin Pasztor. He ended up winning the backup left tackle position behind Pro-bowl veteran Joe Thomas.

On September 18, 2016, Drango earned his first career start against the Baltimore Ravens after the Browns decided to start him as an extra lineman to begin the game. On November 10, 2016, he started at right guard against the Ravens after Joel Bitonio was unable to play after suffering an injury. He started the next three games after winning the job over veteran Alvin Bailey. Drango finished his rookie season by playing all 16 games with 9 starts.

On October 22, 2017, Browns starting left tackle Joe Thomas went down with a torn triceps injury after he had played 10,363 consecutive offensive snaps. The injury would require season-ending surgery. On October 23, 2017, Browns head coach Hue Jackson stated that Drango would start at left tackle in place of Thomas.

Drango was waived by the Browns on September 1, 2018.

=== Los Angeles Chargers ===
On September 18, 2018, Drango was signed to the practice squad of the Los Angeles Chargers. He signed a reserve/future contract with the Chargers on January 17, 2019.

On August 31, 2019, Drango was waived by the Chargers and signed to the practice squad the next day. He was promoted to the active roster on November 18, 2019.
