= Clyde Van Sickle =

American football player (1907–1995)

No. 15, 31, 26
- Position: Guard

Personal information
- Born: May 26, 1907; Pryor, Oklahoma, U.S.
- Died: February 15, 1995 (aged 87); Dallas, Texas, U.S.
- Listed height: 6 ft 1 in (1.85 m)
- Listed weight: 220 lb (100 kg)

Career information
- High school: Morris (Ok); Okmulgee (Ok)
- College: Arkansas

Career history
- Frankford Yellow Jackets (1930); Green Bay Packers (1932–1933)

Awards and highlights
- First-team All-SWC (1928)

Career statistics
- Games played: 20
- Games started: 10
- Stats at Pro Football Reference

Clyde Huntus Van Sickle (May 26, 1907 – February 15, 1995) was a guard in the National Football League (NFL). He first played with the Frankford Yellow Jackets during the 1930 NFL season. After a year away from the NFL, he played two seasons with the Green Bay Packers. He played in 20 games over his three professional seasons.
