= Al Rose =

American football player (1905–1985)

No. 17, 52, 34, 49, 47
- Position: End

Personal information
- Born: January 26, 1905; Oenaville, Texas, U.S.
- Died: October 1985 (aged 80)
- Listed height: 6 ft 3 in (1.91 m)
- Listed weight: 205 lb (93 kg)

Career information
- High school: University Park (TX) Highland Park
- College: Texas

Career history
- Providence Steam Roller (1930–1931); Green Bay Packers (1932–1936); New York Yankees (1936)

Awards and highlights
- NFL champion (1936); Third-team All-Pro (1931); First-team All-SWC (1929)

Career statistics
- Receptions: 40
- Receiving yards: 611
- Touchdowns: 5
- Stats at Pro Football Reference

Alfred Grady Rose (January 26, 1905 – October 1985) was a tight end in the National Football League (NFL) who played for the Providence Steam Roller and the Green Bay Packers, and for one season with the New York Yankees of the American Football League (AFL). Rose was a three-sport athlete for the University of Texas before playing professionally for 7 seasons. He retired after the 1936 season.

Rose was born in Oenaville, Texas, just outside of Temple, in 1905 and went to high school at Highland Park High School in University Park, Texas where he started playing football in 1923. He attended the University of Texas beginning in 1926, where he was a three-sport athlete, earning three letters each in football and basketball and two in track. He led Texas to the Southwest Conference Championship in football in 1928 and in track in 1929. He also finished as the runner-up in the discus at the 1929 SWC Track Championship. In football, where he was nicknamed "Big Un" he played halfback and end; he made the 1929 All-Southwest Conference football team and was named the team's MVP that year.

After graduating from Texas, Rose went on to play in the NFL. His first two seasons he played in Providence, but when that team broke up he was signed by Green Bay where he played until 1936. In 1931, he was named third-team All-Pro by the Green Bay Press-Gazette, and in 1932 he led the league in non-offensive TDs with two. He only played in two games in 1936 before being released by the Packers who went on to win the NFL Championship that season. He finished his career with the Yankees of the AFL. During the offseason he would work with the Douglas Aircraft company in Santa Monica, CA.

Rose stayed in Green Bay after his playing days were over and became a branch manager of CIT Financial Corporation until his retirement in 1936. He was a charter member of the NFL Alumni Association and was inducted into the Texas Longhorns Hall of Honor in 1985.
