= Rags Matthews =

American football player (1905–1999)

Profile
- Position: End

Personal information
- Born: August 17, 1905; Fort Worth, Texas, U.S.
- Died: January 2, 1999 (aged 93); Fort Worth, Texas, U.S.

Career information
- College: TCU (1925–1927)

Awards and highlights
- Second-team All-American (1927); First-team All-SWC (1927)

Raymond "Rags" Matthews (August 17, 1905 – January 2, 1999) was an American football player at Texas Christian University (TCU) in the 1920s. A Fort Worth, Texas native, Matthews attended Polytechnic High School before TCU. He lettered three times under coach Matty Bell, during which the TCU Horned Frogs posted a cumulative record of 17–5–5. He was named the team's Most Valuable Player after the 1926 and 1927 seasons, and was selected to play in the Shrine East-West All-Star Game as a senior in 1927, the first year players from the Southwest Conference were included.

Matthews was named to the All-Time All-SWC Team in 1969, and was elected to the College Football Hall of Fame in 1971. He died in his hometown at the age of 93 in 1999.
