= Barton Koch =

American football player (1907–1964)

Profile
- Position: Guard

Personal information
- Born: April 22, 1907; Temple, Texas, U.S.
- Died: April 28, 1964 (aged 57); Temple, Texas, U.S.
- Listed height: 5 ft 11 in (1.80 m)
- Listed weight: 195 lb (88 kg)

Career information
- College: Baylor (1928–1930)

Awards and highlights
- Consensus All-American (1930); All-Southern (1929); 2× First-team All-SWC (1929, 1930)
- College Football Hall of Fame (Class of 1974)

Barton "Botchey" Koch (April 22, 1907 – April 28, 1964) was an American college football player. He was the first consensus All-America football player from the Southwest Conference. He was elected to the Baylor Sports Hall of Fame in 1961, the Texas Sports Hall of Fame in 1967 and the College Football Hall of Fame in 1974. He was named to the All Time Texas High School Team by Texas Football magazine in 1968 and to the "50-Year Super Stars" of the Southwest Conference by Texas Football magazine in 1969. In 1984, he was added to the Texas High School Football Hall of Fame.

== Baylor University ==
After earning All-State football honors at Temple High School in Temple, Texas, Koch played guard for the Baylor Bears of Baylor University. In 1929 he was chosen for an All-Southern team selected by football fans throughout the south and published by the Central Press newspapers. In 1930 he was a consensus All-American. He was selected by famed sportswriter Grantland Rice as an All-America in Collier's Magazine for 1930. Knute Rockne also wrote of Koch's outstanding play in a letter to Baylor University shortly before Rockne's death in a plane crash. Koch was chosen the outstanding defensive player in the East-West Shrine Game at San Francisco's Kezar Stadium. It was a game in which the West defeated the East, 3–0. The San Francisco Chronicle reported, "there were a lot of great linemen in that game . . . but Koch was easily the best. A steamroller could not get over him." In 1940, Harry Stuhldreher, quarterback of Notre Dame's Four Horsemen, and Rice named Koch to their All-Time All-American team for publication. "He was the best guard I ever saw," Stuhldreher said. "Rockne also told me he was far and away the best guard Knute ever saw. Koch was big, fast, smart and aggressive - a powerful lineman with a keen football brain. I haven't seen as good a guard since - either in college or pro."
