= 2022 Texas Bowl =

2022 Texas Bowl can refer to:

- 2022 Texas Bowl (January), a postseason game following the 2021 season, between the LSU Tigers and Kansas State Wildcats
- 2022 Texas Bowl (December), a postseason game following the 2022 season, between the Texas Tech Red Raiders and Ole Miss Rebels
