= Ray Farris =

American football player

No. 99
- Position: Guard

Personal information
- Listed weight: 185 lb (84 kg)

Career information
- College: North Carolina Tar Heels (1927–1929)

Awards and highlights
- Second-team All-American (1929); All-Southern (1929)

Ray Farris was a college football player.

== University of North Carolina ==
Farris was a prominent guard for the North Carolina Tar Heels of the University of North Carolina. He was known as a multi-threat guard because he could also do the work of a back. One Dr. R. B. Lawson picked Farris as a guard on his all-time North Carolina football team.

=== 1929 ===
He was captain and All-Southern in 1929. The 1929 team scored a record 346 points. Farris was also selected as a third-team All-American. The 1929 season was seen as a great turnaround for the UNC football team, led by the "hell-for-leather guard" Farris. He wore #99.

=== 1930 ===
In 1930 he coached the school's freshman team.

== Politics ==
Also in 1930 he "jumped from college to politics" as an organizer for the state young people's democratic organization.
