= LeRoy Sprankle =

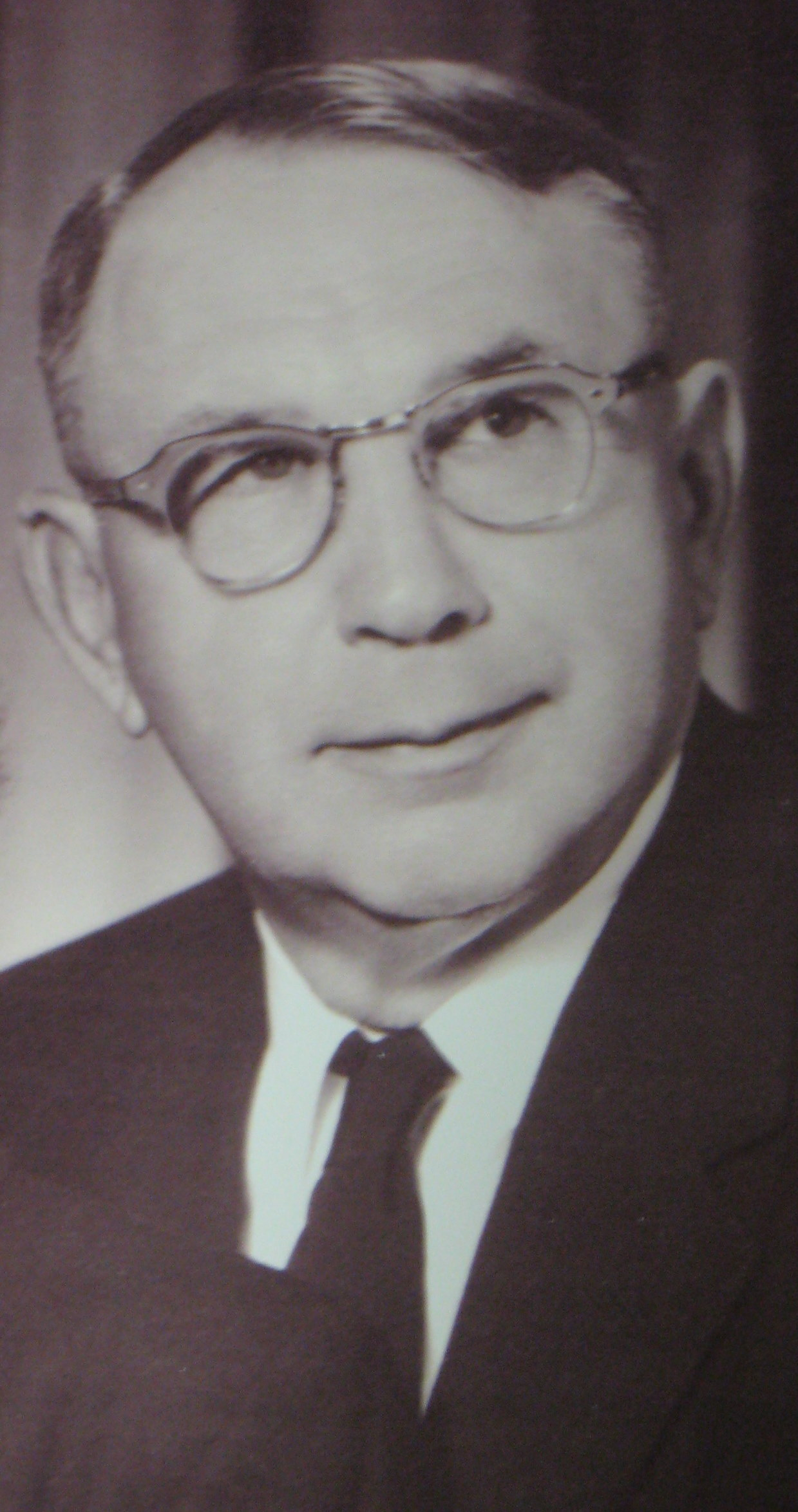

Biographical details
- Born: June 11, 1894; Beach City, Ohio, U.S.
- Died: September 25, 1972; Homestead, Florida, U.S.

Playing career
- 1913–1917: Mount Union College

Coaching career (HC unless noted)
- 1920: Canton Independents
- ?: Carrollton HS (OH)
- 1921–1943: Kingsport HS (TN)
- 1943–1953: Redlands HS (FL)

Head coaching record
- Overall: 80–38–9 (football); 401–142 (basketball); 117–61 (baseball)

LeRoy Sprankle (June 11, 1894 – September 25, 1972) was an American high school sports coach and athletics advocate in Eastern Tennessee and South Florida. Often referred to as the "Father of East Tennessee Sports", he had several notable accomplishments during his tenured career including: helping to standardize high school officiating in the state of Tennessee, pioneering interstate and international high school sports competition, and most notably, coaching several would-be prominent figures in American and sports history.

== Early life ==
Sprankle was born on June 11, 1894, in Beach City, Ohio. He was the older brother of Dale R. Sprankle, who would also become famous as a college athletics coach and athletics director in Michigan. At the age of 16, his family moved to Canton, Ohio, where he graduated from high school and first became involved in athletics. He then attended Mount Union College and competed in baseball, basketball, and football while completing a degree in mathematics. In 1918 Sprankle was drafted into the First World War, and served as a Second Lieutenant at Camp Gordon in Georgia. After Armistice, he resumed civilian life as the general manager of the Canton Independents professional basketball team. It was around this time that he became affiliated with the Canton Bulldogs professional football team and became good friends with several early football "legends", most notably Jim Thorpe.

== Coaching career ==
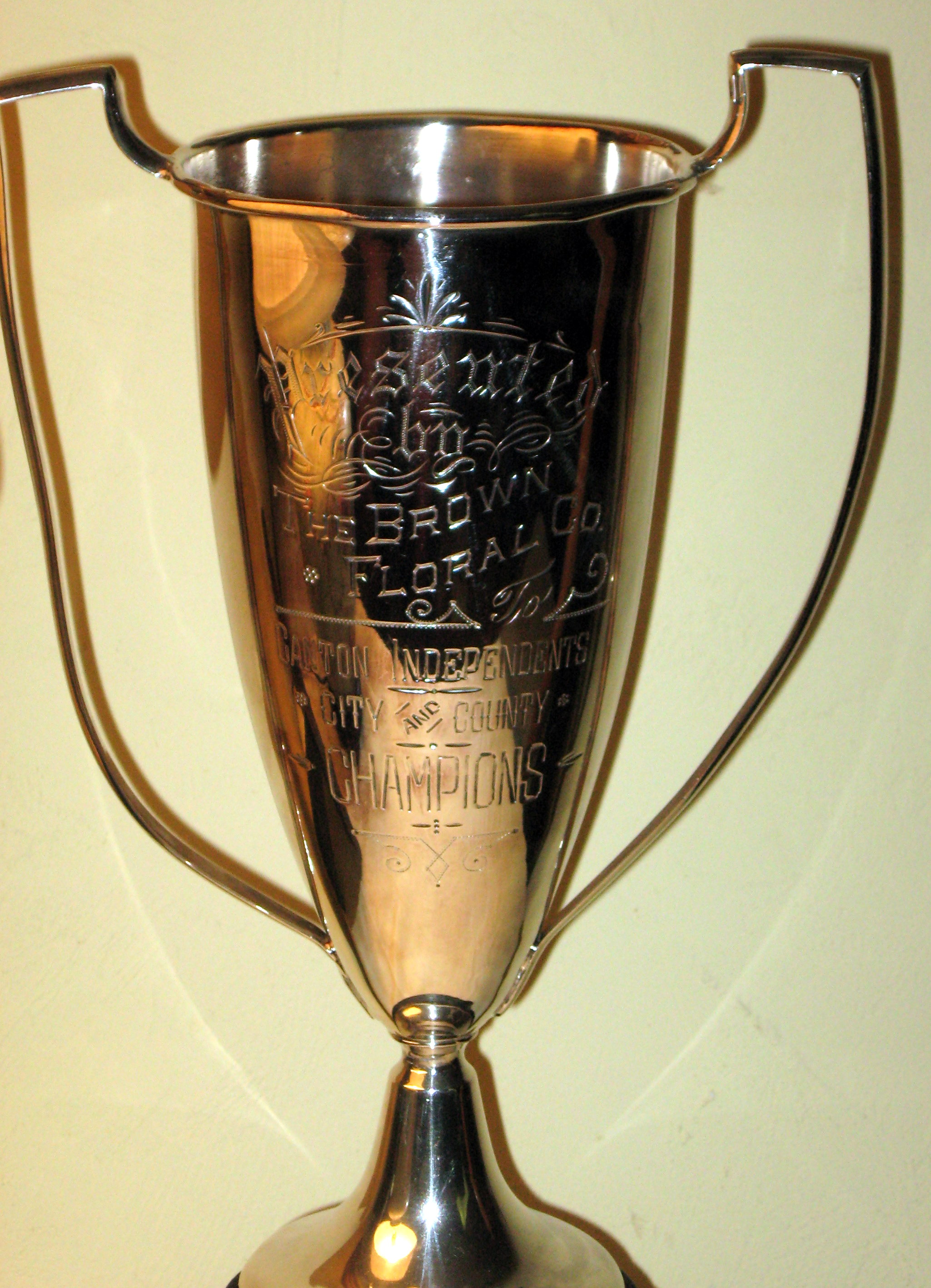
Canton Independents Trophy

Following the conclusion of the First World War, there was a great demand for qualified coaches. Likewise, LeRoy Sprankle was quickly contacted by a high school in Carrollton, Ohio, to coach its basketball team. Despite having to commute by train and lodge overnight twice a week in order to keep his Canton job, Sprankle accepted the position out of his interest for helping boys. His success there warranted him an offer to coach in Tennessee at Kingsport High School (which was later renamed Dobyns-Bennett High School). In late 1921, he accepted the offer and became the head baseball, basketball, football, and track coach.

While at Kingsport, he became known for taking a keen interest in helping his players and students, many of whom went on to become noted for their life achievements. Over the course of the ten seasons that Sprankle coached football at the school, he compiled an 80–38–9 record, including a 193–0 victory over Norton High School from Virginia in 1926, one of the largest margins of victory in American football at any level. His track team won 3 state championships in 11 years, and he amassed a 117–61 record in baseball. Most notably, Sprankle's basketball team was a pioneer in interstate competition. At a time when it was rare to play games out of state, his team traveled annually across the state of Florida and the rest of the Southeast. In 1940, as part of the annual Florida trip, his team played a series of exhibition games in Cuba, one of the only high school sports teams ever to do so. Overall, Sprankle's basketball team at Dobyns-Bennett High School went 401–142, winning 18 championships.

In 1943, he and his family were forced to move to South Florida for health-related reasons. Nevertheless, he continued to coach, at Redlands High School in south Dade County, until 1953 when the school combined with Homestead High School. While retired from coaching, he worked with the new South Dade High School as business manager until he completely retired in 1964. Sprankle died in Homestead, Florida, in 1972 at the age of 78, he was survived by his wife Jess, and his children, Rita and Dale. At his funeral, Bobby Dodd sent his remorse in a message that read:

Sprankle became a second father to me and to hundreds of others like me.... Yes, I believe that LeRoy Sprankle has had more influence on the lives of the young people of Kingsport than any other person. I am sure he did, and I will always be grateful for the help he gave me.

Since his death, the city of Kingsport, Tennessee, has named a day in his honor. The gymnasium at the former Dobyns-Bennett High School (now John Sevier Middle School) was also dedicated after him.

== Notable players coached ==
Name	College accolades	Notable accomplishments
Albert H. Agett	Michigan State football and track, All-American Football Honorable Mention, 1937 College All-Star Game	PhD. Organic Chemistry. Kicker for Detroit Lions. Assistant Coach at Michigan State University. Awarded several patents.
John R. Bell	Georgia Tech Yellow Jackets football	asst. football coach at Georgia Tech (1954–56, 1959–66), AD and head football coach at SW Louisiana (1957–59), AD and head football coach at East Tennessee State University (1966–73), ETSU Hall of Fame inductee
Ed Cifers	Tennessee football and track team captain	played with the Washington Redskins (1941–42, 1946) and the Chicago Bears (1947), Sports Illustrated Silver Anniversary winner, President of Charles H. Bacon Company
Robert "Bob" Cifers	Tennessee football	played with the Detroit Lions
Denver Crawford	Tennessee football team captain, College All-Star Game	drafted by the Green Bay Packers, played with the New York Yankees (1940 AFL), asst. football coach at Washington & Lee, Maryland, Mississippi State, and Minnesota
Darrell Crawford	starting QB at Georgia Tech, 2nd Team All-American, All-Star Game	played with the Chicago Cardinals, asst. football coach at the University of Richmond, Georgia Tech Hall of Fame inductee
Van M. Darsey	Adrian College football	President of Parker Rust-Proof Company and Tropical Paint Company, member of Board of Trustees at Adrian College
Milton DeVault	not available	two term mayor of Kingsport, TN
Bobby Dodd	starting QB at Tennessee, 1930 All-American	asst. football coach at Georgia Tech (1931–46), head football coach at Georgia Tech (1947–67), AD at Georgia Tech (1950–76), Georgia Tech Hall of Fame, Georgia Sports Hall of Fame, College Football Hall of Fame inductee (both as a player and coach)
Paul Hug	Tennessee football (All-Conference Defensive End), baseball, basketball, and track	head basketball and asst. football coach at Southwestern University in Memphis (now Rhodes College), coach at UT Martin (1939–41, 1946)
Bobby Peters	Princeton basketball, football captain, and track, Football All-American	3-term Tennessee State Senator, Sports Illustrated Silver Anniversary All-American
Tommy Peters	Davidson baseball, basketball, football, and track, had the highest basketball PPG in the country final year	killed in World War II, silver star
Jimmy Quillen	not available	Tennessee House of Representatives (1954–62), U.S. House of Representatives (1963–97)
Nat H. Reasor	Mercer basketball, football, and track	played minor league baseball with the Macon Peaches, played with the Memphis Tigers (AFL), AFL All-Star Team, Mercer Hall of Fame inductee
Henry W. Sams	PhD from UNC	author, dean of English Department at Penn State
Beryl Shipley	Delta State basketball	head basketball coach at SW Louisiana (1957–73), head coach of the San Diego Conquistadors of the ABA (1975), Louisiana Basketball Hall of Fame inductee, all-time most winningest coach at SW Louisiana
