= Hershel Burgess =

American football player

Profile
- Position: Fullback

Career information
- College: Texas A&M (1926–1928)

Awards and highlights
- National championship (1927); All-Southern (1928); Second-team All-SWC (1927); Texas A&M Athletic Hall of Fame

Hershel E. Burgess was a college football player. He was a prominent running back for the Texas A&M Aggies, a star on the national champion 1927 team. He was inducted into the Texas A&M Athletic Hall of Fame in 1975. There is a physics chair at Texas A&M named in his honor, the Hershel E. Burgess '29 Chair in Physics.
