= Jake Williams (American football) =

American football player (1905–1967)

- Williams, 1927

No. 5, 19, 42
- Positions: Tackle, end, guard, center

Personal information
- Born: August 28, 1905; Texas, U.S.
- Died: March 20, 1967 (aged 61); Fort Worth, Texas, U.S.
- Listed height: 6 ft 0 in (1.83 m)
- Listed weight: 205 lb (93 kg)

Career information
- High school: Central (Fort Worth, Texas)
- College: TCU

Career history
- Chicago Cardinals (1929–1933)

Awards and highlights
- First-team All-SWC (1928)

James Crawford "Jake" Williams (August 28, 1905 – March 20, 1967) was an American football player.

Williams was born in Britton, Texas, in 1905. He attended Central High School in Fort Worth, Texas, and then enrolled at Texas Christian University (TCU). He played college football for the TCU Horned Frogs from 1925 to 1928. He was the team captain and played in nearly every minute of every game for the 1928 TCU team that compiled an 8–2 record. At the end of the 1928 season, he was selected as a first-team tackle on the 1928 All-Southwest Conference football team. Flem R. Hall of the Fort Worth Star-Telegram called Williams "one of the greatest tackles ever produced in the Southwest."

Williams also played professional football in the National Football League (NFL) as a tackle, end, guard, and center for the Chicago Cardinals. He appeared in 44 NFL games, 28 as a starter, from 1929 to 1933.

Williams's son, Jim Williams, also played professional football in the 1950s.

Williams died in 1967 in Fort Worth.
