= Paul Hug =

American football player and coach (1906–1949)

Biographical details
- Born: June 27, 1906; Ohio, U.S.
- Died: September 5, 1949 (aged 43); Chattanooga, Tennessee, U.S.

Playing career
- 1928–1930: Tennessee
- Position: End

Coaching career (HC unless noted)
- ?: Southwestern (TN) (assistant)
- 1939–1946: Tennessee JC

Accomplishments and honors

Awards
- All-Southern (1929)

Paul Norman Hug (June 27, 1906 – September 5, 1949) was an American college football player and coach.

== Early years ==
Hug played under LeRoy Sprankle at Kingsport High with Bobby Dodd. Following high school, the only universities to offer scholarships to the two athletes were the University of Tennessee and Vanderbilt University. Dodd recommended that the two of them attend Vanderbilt to play for the Vanderbilt Commodores football team under head coach Dan McGugin, but Dodd said that he did not meet the academic requirements for the university. However, by that time, the two had already turned down Tennessee's offer, so the two decided to travel to Atlanta, where Dodd's brother was attending the Georgia School of Technology. However, Dodd again could not meet the academic requirements. The two tried to join the University of Georgia, but that university did not offer them scholarships. The two were planning to travel to Macon, Georgia, to see if they could attend Mercer University, but around that time, Dodd's brother had contacted Robert Neyland, head coach for the Tennessee Volunteers football team, and was able to convince him to allow the two to join his team. During their time at Tennessee, both Dodd and Hug were members of the Sigma Nu fraternity.

=== University of Tennessee ===
Hug was a prominent end for the Volunteers from 1928 to 1930.

==== 1928 ====
In 1928, Tennessee remained undefeated on the season with a 6–0 victory over Vanderbilt; its first win in the series since 1916. Before 1928, Vanderbilt held a strong advantage over the Volunteers with a record of 18–2–3. Since 1928, Tennessee has dominated the rivalry. The crowd of 22,000 was the largest ever to see a game in Tennessee up to that point. A 16-yard pass from Roy Witt to Paul Hug in the second quarter was the lone score of the contest. He wore number 26 and weighed 172 pounds.

==== 1929 ====
Hug was selected All-Southern in 1929.

== Coaching career ==
Hugh was an assistant at Southwestern University—now known as Rhodes College—and a head coach at the University of Tennessee Junior College—now known as the University of Tennessee at Martin. At the latter institution, he is the namesake of Hug Drive.
