= W. J. Wisdom =

American football player and coach (1930–2010)

William J. Wisdom
Biographical details
- Born: July 25, 1887; Pottsville, Texas, U.S.
- Died: June 6, 1981 (aged 93); Houston, Texas, U.S.

Coaching career (HC unless noted)

Football
- 1924–1928: John Tarleton
- 1930–1935: John Tarleton

Basketball
- 1922–1942: John Tarleton

Head coaching record
- Overall: 73–35–15 (junior college football)

William Jones Wisdom (July 25, 1887 – June 6, 1981) was an American athletics coach. He served as the head coach at John Tarleton College (now known as Tarleton State University) in Stephenville, Texas. He led Tarleton to conference championships in men's basketball, football, tennis, track, and golf.

== Early years ==
Wisdom attended North Texas State Normal College (now known as the University of North Texas) in Denton, Texas, where he competed in football, tennis, and baseball. He also attended the National School of Recreation in Chicago. He also played violin with the orchestra at North Texas State Normal College and sang with campus musical organizations. He also played semiprofessional baseball in the Colorado State League.

Wisdom worked for a time as a business teacher at Tyler Commercial College and later taught English and coached women's basketball for a year at Paducah High School. He next served as a business teacher and football coach at Thorpe Springs Christian College (later part of Texas Christian University).

== Coach at Tarleton ==
In 1920, he became the business manager and head cashier at the college store at John Tarleton College. He became Tarleton's football coach in 1924. He served as the school's football coach from 1924 to 1928 and 1930 to 1935, compiling a 71–35–15 record.

In 1930, Wisdom also took over as Tarleton's men's basketball coach. His only prior experience with basketball was one year as the women's coach in Paducah. He became a student of the game and led the 1933 team to a 13–1 record. He then led the team on an 86-game winning streak from 1934 to 1938. During the streak, Tarleton outscored opponents by a total of 3,457 to 1,650. Tarleton's 86-game streak remained a national record until UCLA won 89 consecutive games in the 1970s. Wisdom was credited with innovations, including the use of the "one-handed" shot and tracking statistics on players' percentage of field goals converted.

== Later years and accolades ==
Wisdom was inducted into the Texas Sports Hall of Fame in 1971 and the Tarleton State University Hall of Fame in 1981. Wisdom Gymnasium on the Tarleton campus is named in his honor in 1970.

Wisdom died in 1981 at age 93 at a hospital in Houston.
