= Noble Atkins =

American football and basketball player

Profile
- Position: Center

Personal information
- Born: September 10, 1906; Borger, Texas, U.S.
- Died: January 22, 1985 (aged 78); Dallas, Texas

Career information
- College: TCU (1929–1930)

Awards and highlights
- Football: Third-team All-American (1930); 2× First-team All-SWC (1929, 1930); All-Southern (1929); Basketball: SWC championship (1931)

Noble James Atkins (September 10, 1906 – January 22, 1985) was a college football, basketball, and baseball player. He was a prominent center for the TCU Horned Frogs football team of Texas Christian. Atkins was selected All-Southern in 1929 by football fans of the south through Central Press newspapers. He weighed some 215 pounds during the football season, and managed 187 while playing basketball. He weighed around 200 when he played baseball. He was a guard on the basketball team, winning the Southwestern Conference under coach Francis Schmidt in 1931, the Frogs' first league title in men's basketball. Some sources called him the greatest athlete in the Southwest.

He signed with the Green Bay Packers in 1933, along with TCU teammate Lon Evans. He took a coaching job in Texas instead of playing for the Packers.
