= Gordy Brown =

American football tackle

Profile
- Position: Tackle

Personal information
- Born: May 20, 1906; Dallas, Texas
- Died: October 10, 1964 (aged 58); Weslaco, Texas
- Listed weight: 172 lb (78 kg)

Career information
- High school: Bryan Street High School
- College: Texas (1928–1930)

Awards and highlights
- First-team All-American (1928); First-team All-SWC (1928); Southwest Conference Champion (1928)

Gordon Asa "Gordy" Brown was an All-American college football lineman at the University of Texas.

At Bryan Street High School Brown made all-state three years in a row.

He lettered for the Texas Longhorns from 1927-1929. In 1928 he earnedall-Southwest Conference and 1st Team All-American (Collier's) honors while helping Texas win the Southwest Conference Championship. He was the Longhorn's second All-American ever. The next year he was the team's captain.

After college he became the first Longhorn to play in the East-West Shrine Bowl by playing in the 1930 iteration. He later went to work for GMAC.

During World War II he served in the Army Air Force's XIX Tactical Air Command where he was a Major.
