= 1927 Southern Conference football season =

- League: NCAA
- Sport: College football
- Duration: September 17, 1927 through December 3, 1927
- Number of teams: 22

Regular Season
- Season champions: Georgia Tech; Tennessee; NC State

Football seasons
- ← 1926 1928 →

1927 Southern Conference football standings
	Conf.					Overall
Team	W		L		T	W		L		T
Georgia Tech +	7	–	0	–	1	8	–	1	–	1
Tennessee +	5	–	0	–	1	8	–	0	–	1
NC State +	4	–	0	–	0	9	–	1	–	0
Vanderbilt	5	–	0	–	2	8	–	1	–	2
No. 8 Georgia	6	–	1	–	0	9	–	1	–	0
Florida	5	–	2	–	0	7	–	3	–	0
Ole Miss	3	–	2	–	0	5	–	3	–	1
Virginia	4	–	4	–	0	5	–	4	–	0
Clemson	2	–	2	–	0	5	–	3	–	1
Alabama	3	–	4	–	1	5	–	4	–	1
LSU	2	–	3	–	1	4	–	4	–	1
Mississippi A&M	2	–	3	–	0	5	–	3	–	0
Washington and Lee	2	–	3	–	0	4	–	4	–	1
VPI	2	–	3	–	0	5	–	4	–	0
Maryland	3	–	5	–	0	4	–	7	–	0
South Carolina	2	–	4	–	0	4	–	5	–	0
VMI	2	–	4	–	0	6	–	4	–	0
Tulane	2	–	5	–	1	2	–	5	–	1
North Carolina	2	–	5	–	0	4	–	6	–	0
Sewanee	1	–	4	–	0	2	–	6	–	0
Kentucky	1	–	5	–	0	3	–	6	–	1
Auburn	0	–	6	–	1	0	–	7	–	2
+ – Conference co-champions; Rankings from Dickinson System

The 1927 Southern Conference football season was the college football games played by the member schools of the Southern Conference as part of the 1927 college football season. The season began on September 17. Games were permitted after Thanksgiving for the first time in the conference.

Georgia's "dream and wonder team" was deemed the national champion by some selectors (the Boand System and Poling System), even though it was upset 12–0 in the rain at the end of the season by would-be SoCon champion Georgia Tech. Prior to the game, Georgia was ranked #1 by the authoritative Dickinson System.

Coach Robert Neyland's Tennessee and Jack McDowall-led North Carolina State also posted undefeated conference records and had claims to conference titles.

Vanderbilt back Jimmy Armistead led the nation in scoring with 138 points, in no small part due to quarterback Bill Spears. One fellow wrote Vanderbilt produced "almost certainly the legit top Heisman candidate in Spears, if there had been a Heisman Trophy to award in 1927."

After Florida had an unexpected loss to Davidson, captain Frank Oosterhoudt was declared ineligible, and replaced at captain by Bill Middlekauff. With Middlekauff at captain, Florida suffered its only further losses to powers Georgia and NC State.

Ole Miss won the first Egg Bowl with a trophy in 1927, led by players Ap Applewhite, Sollie Cohen and V. K. Smith. Clemson hired Josh Cody.

== Season overview ==
=== Results and team statistics ===
Conf. Rank	Team	Head coach	Overall record	Conf. record	PPG	PAG
1 (tie)	Georgia Tech	William Alexander	8–1–1	7–0–1	12.5	3.9
1 (tie)	Tennessee	Robert Neyland	8–1	5–0–1	**27.2**	**2.9**
1 (tie)	NC State	Gus Tebell	9–1	4–0	21.6	6.9
4	Georgia	Kid Woodruff	9–1	6–1	24.8	3.8
5	Vanderbilt	Dan McGugin	8–1–2	5–0–2	26.8	8.5
6	Florida	Tom Sebring	7–3	5–2	16.4	9.6
7	Ole Miss	Homer Hazel	5–3–1	3–2	19.7	8.9
8 (tie)	Virginia	Greasy Neale	5–4	4–4	13.0	13.6
8 (tie)	Clemson	Josh Cody	5–3–1	2–2	8.1	9.3
10	Alabama	Wallace Wade	5–4–1	3–4–1	15.4	7.3
11	LSU	Mike Donahue	4–4–1	2–3–1	14.2	9.2
12 (tie)	Mississippi A&M	John W. Hancock	5–3	2–3	11.6	6.8
12 (tie)	VPI	Andy Gustafson	5–4	2–3	13.9	5.3
12 (tie)	Washington and Lee	Pat Herron	4–4–1	2–3	10.8	9.8
15	Maryland	Curley Byrd	4–7	3–5	16.9	13.1
16 (tie)	VMI	W. C. Raftery	6–4	2–4	14.4	6.4
16 (tie)	South Carolina	Harry Lightsey	4–6	2–4	5.1	19.1
18	Tulane	Bernie Bierman	2–5–1	2–5–1	7.0	15.0
19	North Carolina	Chuck Collins	4–6	2–5	8.6	10.7
20	Sewanee	M. S. Bennett	2–6	1–4	9.8	18.4
21	Kentucky	Harry Gamage	3–6–1	1–5	11.5	16.1
22	Auburn	Dave Morey	0–7–2	0–6–1	3.3	13.8

Key

PPG = Average of points scored per game
PAG = Average of points allowed per game

=== Regular season ===
Index to colors and formatting
Non-conference matchup; SoCon member won
Non-conference matchup; SoCon member lost
Non-conference matchup; tie
Conference matchup

SoCon teams in bold.

==== Week One ====
Date	Visiting team	Home team	Site	Result	Attendance	Reference
September 17	Wofford	**VMI**	Alumni Field • Lexington, Virginia	**W** 37–0		

==== Week Two ====
Date	Visiting team	Home team	Site	Result	Attendance	Reference
September 24	Millsaps	**Alabama**	Denny Field • Tuscaloosa, Alabama	**W** 46–0		
September 24	Stetson	**Auburn**	Drake Field • Auburn, Alabama	**L** 6–0		
September 24	Southern College	**Florida**	Fleming Field • Gainesville, Florida	**W** 26–7		
September 24	Presbyterian	**Clemson**	Riggs Field • Calhoun, South Carolina	**T** 0–0		
September 24	Maryville (TN)	**Kentucky**	Stoll Field • Lexington, Kentucky	**T** 6–6		
September 24	Louisiana Tech	**LSU**	Tiger Stadium • Baton Rouge, Louisiana	**W** 45–0		
September 24	Washington College	**Maryland**	Byrd Stadium • College Park, Maryland	**W** 79–0		
September 24	Ozarks (AR)	**Ole Miss**	Hemingway Stadium • Oxford, Mississippi	**W** 58–0		
September 24	Wake Forest	**North Carolina**	Emerson Field • Chapel Hill, North Carolina	**L** 9–8	12,000	
September 24	Elon	**NC State**	Riddick Stadium • Raleigh, North Carolina	**W** 39–0		
September 24	Transylvania	**Sewanee**	Hardee Field • Sewanee, Tennessee	**W** 34–6		
September 24	Erskine	**South Carolina**	Melton Field • Columbia, South Carolina	**W** 13–6		
September 24	Carson–Newman	**Tennessee**	Shields–Watkins Field • Knoxville, Tennessee	**W** 33–0		
September 24	**Vanderbilt**	Chattanooga	Chamberlain Field • Chattanooga, Tennessee	**W** 45–18		
September 24	Hampden–Sydney	**Virginia**	Lambeth Field • Charlottesville, Virginia	**W** 38–6		
September 24	Richmond	**VMI**	Alumni Field • Lexington, Virginia	**W** 22–0		
September 24	Roanoke	**VPI**	Miles Stadium • Blacksburg, Virginia	**W** 21–2		
September 24	Lynchburg	**Washington & Lee**	Wilson Field • Lexington, Virginia	**W** 27–2		

==== Week Three ====
Date	Visiting team	Home team	Site	Result	Attendance	Reference
September 30	Southwestern (TN)	**Alabama**	Denny Field • Tuscaloosa, Alabama	**W** 31–0		
September 30	**NC State**	Furman	Manly Field • Greenville, South Carolina	**L** 20–0	3,000	
October 1	**Auburn**	**Clemson**	Riggs Field • Calhoun, South Carolina	**CLEM** 3–0		
October 1	Davidson	**Florida**	Fleming Field • Gainesville, Florida	**L** 12–0	7,000	
October 1	**VMI**	**Georgia Tech**	Grant Field • Atlanta, Georgia	**GT** 7–0	17,000	
October 1	Indiana	**Kentucky**	Stoll Field • Lexington, Kentucky	**L** 21–0		
October 1	Southwestern Louisiana	**LSU**	Tiger Stadium • Baton Rouge, Louisiana	**W** 52–0		
October 1	**Ole Miss**	**Tulane**	Tulane Stadium • New Orleans, Louisiana	**TUL** 19–7		
October 1	Birmingham–Southern	**Mississippi A&M**	Scott Field • Starkville, Mississippi	**W** 19–7		
October 1	**South Carolina**	**Maryland**	Byrd Stadium • College Park, Maryland	**MD** 26–0		
October 1	Bryson College	**Sewanee**	Hardee Field • Sewanee, Tennessee	**L** 7–0		
October 1	**Tennessee**	**North Carolina**	Emerson Field • Chapel Hill, North Carolina	**TENN** 26–0	7,000	
October 1	Ouachita Baptist	**Vanderbilt**	Dudley Field • Nashville, Tennessee	**W** 39–10		
October 1	**Virginia**	**Georgia**	Sanford Field • Athens, Georgia	**UGA** 32–0		
October 1	Hampden–Sydney	**VPI**	Miles Stadium • Blacksburg, Virginia	**W** 13–0		
October 1	**Washington & Lee**	West Virginia	Laidley Field • Charleston, West Virginia	**T** 6–6		

==== Week Four ====
Date	Visiting team	Home team	Site	Result	Attendance	Reference
October 7	Hendrix	**Ole Miss**	Hemingway Stadium • Oxford, Mississippi	**T** 0–0		
October 8	**LSU**	**Alabama**	Rickwood Field • Birmingham, Alabama	**T** 0–0	12,000	
October 8	**Florida**	**Auburn**	Drake Field • Auburn, Alabama	**FLA** 33–6		
October 8	**Georgia**	Yale	Yale Bowl • New Haven, Connecticut	**W** 14–10		
October 8	**Tulane**	**Georgia Tech**	Grant Field • Atlanta, Georgia	**GT** 13–6	12,000	
October 8	Kentucky Wesleyan	**Kentucky**	Stoll Field • Lexington, Kentucky	**W** 13–7		
October 8	**Maryland**	**North Carolina**	Emerson Field • Chapel Hill, North Carolina	**UNC** 7–6		
October 8	Louisiana Tech	**Mississippi A&M**	Scott Field • Starkville, Mississippi	**W** 14–0		
October 8	**Sewanee**	Texas A&M	Fair Park Stadium • Dallas, Texas	**L** 18–0	6,000	
October 8	Maryville (TN)	**Tennessee**	Shields–Watkins Field • Knoxville, Tennessee	**W** 7–0		
October 8	Centre	**Vanderbilt**	Dudley Field • Nashville, Tennessee	**W** 53–6		
October 8	**South Carolina**	**Virginia**	Lambeth Field • Charlottesville, Virginia	**SCAR** 13–12		
October 8	**VPI**	Colgate	Whitnall Field • Hamilton, New York	**W** 6–0		
October 8	Roanoke	**VMI**	Alumni Field • Lexington, Virginia	**W** 32–0		
October 8	Duke	**Washington & Lee**	Wilson Field • Lexington, Virginia	**W** 12–7		

==== Week Five ====
Date	Visiting team	Home team	Site	Result	Attendance	Reference
October 13	Erskine	**Clemson**	Riggs Field • Calhoun, South Carolina	**W** 25–6		
October 13	Wake Forest	**NC State**	Riddick Stadium • Raleigh, North Carolina	**W** 30–7		
October 15	**Alabama**	**Georgia Tech**	Grant Field • Atlanta, Georgia	**GT** 13–0	25,000	
October 15	**LSU**	**Auburn**	Cramton Bowl • Montgomery, Alabama	**LSU** 9–0		
October 15	**Kentucky**	**Florida**	Durkee Field • Jacksonville, Florida	**FLA** 27–6	10,000	
October 15	Furman	**Georgia**	Sanford Field • Athens, Georgia	**W** 32–0		
October 15	**VPI**	**Maryland**	League Park • Norfolk, Virginia	**MD** 13–7		
October 15	**Ole Miss**	**Tennessee**	Shields–Watkins Field • Knoxville, Tennessee	**TENN** 21–7		
October 15	**Mississippi A&M**	**Tulane**	Tulane Stadium • New Orleans, Louisiana	**MSA&M** 13–6		
October 15	**North Carolina**	**South Carolina**	Melton Field • Columbia, South Carolina	**SCAR** 14–6	7,000	
October 15	**Vanderbilt**	Texas	Fair Park Stadium • Dallas, Texas	**L** 13–6	10,000	
October 15	**VMI**	**Virginia**	Lambeth Field • Charlottesville, Virginia	**UVA** 13–8		

==== Week Six ====
Date	Visiting team	Home team	Site	Result	Attendance	Reference
October 20	**Clemson**	South Carolina	State Fairgrounds • Columbia, South Carolina	**CLEM** 20–0	13,000	
October 22	**Sewanee**	Alabama	Rickwood Field • Birmingham, Alabama	**ALA** 24–0		
October 22	**Auburn**	Georgia	Memorial Stadium • Columbus, Georgia	**UGA** 33–3		
October 22	**NC State**	Florida	Plant Field • Tampa, Florida	**NCST** 12–6	7,000	
October 22	**North Carolina**	Georgia Tech	Grant Field • Atlanta, Georgia	**GT** 13–0	13,000	
October 22	**Mississippi A&M**	LSU	Mississippi State Fairgrounds • Jackson, Mississippi	**LSU** 9–7		
October 22	**Maryland**	VMI	Tate Field • Richmond, Virginia	**MD** 10–6		
October 22	Transylvania	Tennessee	Shields–Watkins Field • Knoxville, Tennessee	**W** 57–0		
October 22	**Tulane**	Vanderbilt	Dudley Field • Nashville, Tennessee	**VAN** 32–0		
October 22	**VPI**	Virginia	Lambeth Field • Charlottesville, Virginia	**UVA** 7–0		
October 22	**Washington & Lee**	Kentucky	Stoll Field • Lexington, Kentucky	**W&L** 25–0		

==== Week Seven ====
Date	Visiting team	Home team	Site	Result	Attendance	Reference
October 27	**South Carolina**	The Citadel	County Fairgrounds • Orangeburg, South Carolina	**W** 6–0		
October 29	**Mississippi A&M**	**Alabama**	Denny Field • Tuscaloosa, Alabama	**ALA** 13–7	7,000	
October 29	**Auburn**	Howard (AL)	Rickwood Field • Birmingham, Alabama	**T** 9–9		
October 29	Wofford	**Clemson**	Riggs Field • Calhoun, South Carolina	**W** 6–0		
October 29	Mercer	**Florida**	Fleming Field • Gainesville, Florida	**W** 32–6	9,000	
October 29	**Georgia**	**Tulane**	Tulane Stadium • New Orleans, Louisiana	**UGA** 31–0		
October 29	**Georgia Tech**	Notre Dame	Cartier Field • South Bend, Indiana	**L** 26–7	20,000	
October 29	Arkansas	**LSU**	State Fair Stadium • Shreveport, Louisiana	**L** 28–0	12,000	
October 29	**Washington & Lee**	**Maryland**	Byrd Stadium • College Park, Maryland	**W&L** 13–6		
October 29	**Ole Miss**	**Sewanee**	Hardee Field • Sewanee, Tennessee	**MISS** 28–14		
October 29	**North Carolina**	**NC State**	Riddick Stadium • Raleigh, North Carolina	**NCST** 19–6	18,000	
October 29	**VPI**	Chattanooga	Chamberlain Field • Chattanooga, Tennessee	**L** 14–13		
October 29	**Virginia**	**Tennessee**	Shields–Watkins Field • Knoxville, Tennessee	**TENN** 42–0		
October 29	**Kentucky**	**Vanderbilt**	Dudley Field • Nashville, Tennessee	**VAN** 34–6	6,000	
October 29	**VMI**	Davidson	Richardson Field • Davidson, North Carolina	**W** 20–0		

==== Week Eight ====
Date	Visiting team	Home team	Site	Result	Attendance	Reference
November 5	Kentucky	**Alabama**	Rickwood Field • Birmingham, Alabama	**ALA** 21–6		
November 5	Auburn	**Tulane**	Tulane Stadium • New Orleans, Louisiana	**T** 6–6		
November 5	Clemson	The Citadel	Johnson Hagood Stadium • Charleston, South Carolina	**W** 13–0		
November 5	Georgia	**Florida**	Durkee Field • Jacksonville, Florida	**UGA** 28–0	16,000	
November 5	LSU	**Ole Miss**	Hemingway Stadium • Oxford, Mississippi	**MISS** 12–7		
November 5	Maryland	Yale	Yale Bowl • New Haven, Connecticut	**L** 30–6		
November 5	North Carolina	**VMI**	Alumni Field • Lexington, Virginia	**VMI** 7–0		
November 5	South Carolina	**VPI**	Tate Field • Richmond, Virginia	**VPI** 35–0		
November 5	Sewanee	**Tennessee**	Shields–Watkins Field • Knoxville, Tennessee	**TENN** 32–12		
November 5	Virginia	**Washington & Lee**	Wilson Field • Lexington, Virginia	**UVA** 13–7		
November 6	Vanderbilt	**Georgia Tech**	Grant Field • Atlanta, Georgia	**T** 0–0	17,000	

==== Week Nine ====
Date	Visiting team	Home team	Site	Result	Attendance	Reference
November 11	Loyola (IL)	**Ole Miss**	League Park • Jackson, Mississippi	**L** 7–6		
November 12	**Florida**	**Alabama**	Cramton Bowl • Montgomery, Alabama	**FLA** 13–6		
November 12	**Mississippi A&M**	**Auburn**	Rickwood Field • Birmingham, Alabama	**MSA&M** 7–6		
November 12	**Clemson**	**Georgia**	Sanford Field • Athens, Georgia	**UGA** 32–0		
November 12	**LSU**	**Georgia Tech**	Grant Field • Atlanta, Georgia	**GT** 23–0		
November 12	**Kentucky**	**VMI**	Laidley Field • Charleston, West Virginia	**UK** 25–0		
November 12	Davidson	**North Carolina**	Kenan Memorial Stadium • Chapel Hill, North Carolina	**W** 27–0	9,000	
November 12	**NC State**	Duke	Hanes Field • Durham, North Carolina	**W** 20–18		
November 13	**South Carolina**	Furman	Manly Field • Greenville, South Carolina	**L** 10–7		
November 12	**Tennessee**	**Vanderbilt**	Dudley Field • Nashville, Tennessee	**T** 7–7		
November 12	**Sewanee**	**Tulane**	Tulane Stadium • New Orleans, Louisiana	**SEW** 12–6	9,000	
November 12	**Maryland**	**Virginia**	Lambeth Field • Charlottesville, Virginia	**UVA** 21–0		
November 12	**Washington & Lee**	**VPI**	Miles Stadium • Blacksburg, Virginia	**VPI** 21–0		

==== Week Ten ====
Date	Visiting team	Home team	Site	Result	Attendance	Reference
November 18	Millsaps	**Mississippi A&M**	Scott Field • Starkville, Mississippi	**W** 6–0		
November 19	Mercer	**Georgia**	Sanford Field • Athens, Georgia	**W** 26–7		
November 19	Oglethorpe	**Georgia Tech**	Grant Field • Atlanta, Georgia	**W** 19–7		
November 19	**Kentucky**	Centre	Farris Stadium • Danville, Kentucky	**W** 530		
November 19	**North Carolina**	Duke	Hanes Field • Durham, North Carolina	**W** 18–0		
November 19	**Maryland**	**Vanderbilt**	Dudley Field • Nashville, Tennessee	**VAN** 39–20	5,000	

==== Week Eleven ====
Date	Visiting team	Home team	Site	Result	Attendance	Reference
November 24	Auburn	**Georgia Tech**	Grant Field • Atlanta, Georgia	**GT** 18–0	15,000	
November 24	Clemson	Furman	Manly Field • Greenville, South Carolina	**L** 28–0		
November 24	Washington & Lee	**Florida**	Durkee Field • Jacksonville, Florida	**FLA** 20–7	12,000	
November 24	Tulane	**LSU**	Tiger Stadium • Baton Rouge, Louisiana	**TUL** 13–6	20,000	
November 24	Virginia	**North Carolina**	Kenan Memorial Stadium • Chapel Hill, North Carolina	**UNC** 14–10		
November 24	NC State	**South Carolina**	Melton Field • Columbia, South Carolina	**NCST** 34–0		
November 24	Maryland	Johns Hopkins	Baltimore Stadium • Baltimore, Maryland	**L** 14–13		
November 24	Mississippi A&M	**Ole Miss**	Hemingway Stadium • Oxford, Mississippi	**MISS** 20–12		
November 24	Tennessee	**Kentucky**	Stoll Field • Lexington, Kentucky	**TENN** 20–0		
November 24	VMI	**VPI**	Maher Field • Roanoke, Virginia	**VMI** 12–9		
November 27	Georgia	**Alabama**	Legion Field • Birmingham, Alabama	**UGA** 20–6	25,000	

==== Week Twelve ====
Date	Visiting team	Home team	Site	Result	Attendance	Reference
December 3	**Vanderbilt**	**Alabama**	Legion Field • Birmingham, Alabama	**VAN** 14–7	20,000	
December 3	**Maryland**	**Florida**	Durkee Field • Jacksonville, Florida	**FLA** 7–6	2,000	
December 3	**Georgia**	**Georgia Tech**	Grant Field • Atlanta, Georgia	**GT** 12–0	38,000	
December 3	Michigan State	**NC State**	Riddick Stadium • Raleigh, North Carolina	**W** 19–0		

== Awards and honors ==
=== All-Americans ===
- E – Tom Nash, Georgia (AP-3; UP-3; COL-1; INS; NANA; HE-1; DJW-1; BE-3; LP-1; AAB)
- E – Chick Shiver, Georgia (AP-1; UP-1; NEA; CP-2; HE-2; DJW-3; NYS-1; BE-1; LP-2)
- T – Fred Pickhard, Alabama (UP-2; CP-2)
- G – John Barnhill, Tennessee (AP-2)
- G – Gene Smith, Georgia (AP-3)
- C – Elvin Butcher, Tennessee (DJW-2)
- QB – Bill Spears, Vanderbilt (AP-1; UP-2; INS; NANA; CP-2; HE-3; DJW-1; LP-2)
- FB – Herdis McCrary, Georgia (AP-2; UP-2; HE-3; DJW-2)

=== All-Southern team ===
The following includes the composite All-Southern team compiled by the Associated Press.

Position	Name	First-team selectors	Team
QB	Bill Spears	AP, UP, C, CP	Vanderbilt
HB	Stumpy Thomason	AP, UP, C	Georgia Tech
HB	Dick Dodson	AP, UP	Tennessee
FB	Herdis McCrary	AP, UP, C, CP	Georgia
E	Tom Nash	AP, C	Georgia
T	Fred Pickhard	AP, UP, CP	Alabama
G	John Barnhill	AP, UP, C, CP	Tennessee
C	Elvin Butcher	AP, CP	Tennessee
G	Gene Smith	AP, UP, CP	Georgia
T	Jess Tinsley	AP	LSU
E	Chick Shiver	AP, UP, CP	Georgia

== See also ==
- 1927 Georgia vs. Yale football game
