= 1927 College Football All-Southern Team =

American all-star college football team

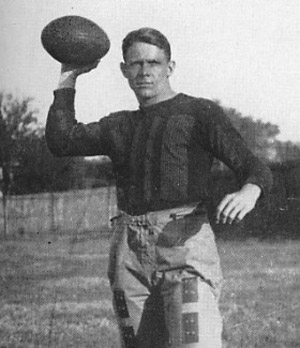
Bill Spears was a near unanimous selection.

The 1927 College Football All-Southern Team consists of American football players selected to the College Football All-Southern Teams selected by various organizations in for the 1927 Southern Conference football season.

== Composite eleven ==
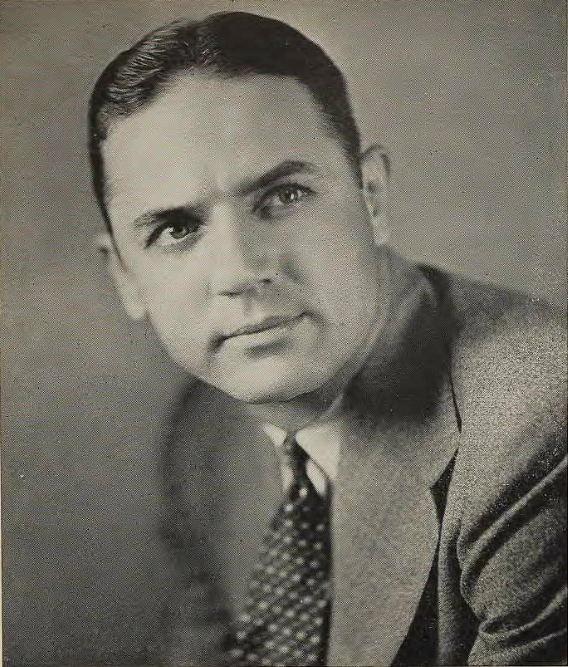
John Barnhill as coach.

The All-Southern eleven compiled by the Associated Press included:

- John Barnhill, guard for Tennessee, second-team AP All-American, later head coach at his alma mater.
- Elvin Butcher, center for Tennessee. His play against Vanderbilt helped secure the spot on the eleven, as he outplayed Vandy center Vernon Sharpe, who arguably had the better season.
- Dick Dodson, halfback for Tennessee, set a record with a 91 yard run versus Transylvania. It's still the second longest run in Tennessee history, broken with a 99 yard run by Kelsey Finch against Florida in 1977. In the Tennessee-Vanderbilt game of '27, Dodson carried the ball but four times, yet was the main reason for Tennessee keeping the game a tie.
- Herdis McCrary, fullback for Georgia, second-team AP and UP All-American. Known as "Bull," he played in the National Football League for the Green Bay Packers from 1929 to 1933.
- Tom Nash, end for Georgia, consensus All-American. He played professionally for the Green Bay Packers, selected All-Pro in 1932.
- Fred Pickhard, tackle and captain for Alabama, second-team CP and UP All-American.
- Ivey Shiver, end and captain for Georgia's "dream and wonder team." Known as "Chick," he was first-team AP All-American. He played professional baseball for the Detroit Tigers and Cincinnati Reds.
- Gene Smith, guard for Georgia, third-team AP All-American. He played in the NFL for the Portsmouth Spartans.
- Bill Spears, quarterback for Vanderbilt, nearest to a unanimous selection, first-team AP All-American, inducted into the College Football Hall of Fame in 1962. He was speedy and rarely threw an interception.
- Stumpy Thomason, halfback for Georgia Tech, played in the NFL for the Brooklyn Dodgers and Philadelphia Eagles.
- Jess Tinsley, tackle for LSU, cousin of Gaynell Tinsley. He played in the NFL for the Chicago Cardinals.

== Composite overview ==
Bill Spears received the most selections from the Associated Press composite. Sixty four votes in all were cast.

Name	Position	School	First-team selections
Bill Spears	Quarterback	Vanderbilt	61
Herdis McCrary	Fullback/Halfback	Georgia	52
Ivey Shiver	End	Georgia	43
Fred Pickhard	Tackle	Alabama	42
Tom Nash	End	Georgia	37
John Barnhill	Guard	Tennessee	37
Stumpy Thomason	Halfback	Georgia Tech	26
Gene Smith	Guard	Georgia	25
Elvin Butcher	Center	Tennessee	23
Jess Tinsley	Tackle	LSU	17
Jim Bowdoin	Guard	Alabama	17
Vernon Sharpe	Center	Vanderbilt	17
Jack McDowall	Halfback/Quarterback	North Carolina A & M	17
Dick Dodson	Halfback	Tennessee	16
Ed Crowley	End	Georgia Tech	14
Phoney Smith	Halfback	Mercer	14
Bill Banker	Halfback	Tulane	13
Harry Schwartz	Center	North Carolina	9
Larry Creson	End	Vanderbilt	7
V. K. Smith	Guard	Ole Miss	7
Frank Peake	Halfback	VPI	7
Dave McArthur	Tackle	Tennessee	6
Glenn Lautzenhiser	Tackle	Georgia	6
Bill Brunson	Tackle	Mississippi A & M	4
Duke Kimbrough	Tackle	Sewanee	4
Clark Pearce	Tackle	Alabama	4
Earl Fitzpatrick	Tackle	Washington & Lee	4
V. E. Miles	Guard	VPI	4
Peter Pund	Center	Georgia Tech	4
Raleigh Drennon	Guard	Georgia Tech	3
William Patterson	Center	Auburn	2
Jimmy Armistead	Fullback	Vanderbilt	2
H. S. Spotts	End	Washington & Lee	1+
Allyn McKeen	End	Tennessee	1+
Ap Applewhite	End	Ole Miss	1+
Bill Middlekauff	Fullback	Florida	1
Sollie Cohen	Fullback	Ole Miss	1
Tom Young	Fullback	North Carolina	1

== All-Southerns of 1927 ==
=== Ends ===
- Ivey "Chick" Shiver, Georgia (AP-1, UP-1, CP, WMA, EB)
- Tom Nash*, Georgia (AP-1, UP-2, C, WMA, EB)
- Ed Crowley, Georgia Tech (AP-2, UP-1, WMA)
- Larry "Kitty" Creson, Vanderbilt (AP-2, UP-2, C, WMA)
- Rags Matthews, Texas Christian (College Football Hall of Fame) (CP)
- H. S. Spotts, Washington & Lee (AP-c, WMA-r)
- Allyn McKeen, Tennessee (College Football Hall of Fame) (AP-c)
- Ap Applewhite, Mississippi (AP-c)
- Pinkie Thornhill, VMI (UP-c)
- H. R. Lewis, Mississippi A & M (UP-c)
- Moss, VMI (UP-c)
- Patrick Brown, Tulane (WMA-r)

=== Tackles ===
- Fred Pickhard, Alabama (AP-1, UP-1, CP, WMA, EB)
- Jess Tinsley, LSU (AP-1, UP-2)
- Glenn Lautzenhiser, Georgia (AP-2, UP-1)
- Dave McArthur, Tennessee (AP-2, C)
- Garrett Morehead, North Carolina (UP-2)
- B. Winston Cardwell, Virginia (UP-c, CP, WMA)
- E. J. Hood, Georgia Tech (UP-c, WMA)
- Bill Brunson, Mississippi A & M (AP-c, UP-c)
- Duke Kimbrough, Sewanee (AP-c)
- Clark Pearce, Alabama (AP-c)
- Earl Fitzpatrick, Washington and Lee (AP-c)
- Kenneth Rugh, VMI (UP-c)
- Guy Nesom, LSU (UP-c)
- Donald Adams, Maryland (UP-c)
- Frank Speer, Georgia Tech (C)
- Warren, LSU (WMA-r)

=== Guards ===
- John Barnhill, Tennessee (AP-1, UP-1, C, CP, WMA, EB-as T)
- Gene Smith, Georgia (AP-1, UP-1, CP, WMA, EB)
- Jim Bowdoin, Alabama (AP-2, UP-2, C, WMA)
- V. K. Smith, Ole Miss (AP-2)
- B. B. Tips, Washington & Lee (UP-2, WMA-r)
- Raleigh Drennon, Georgia Tech (AP-c, UP-c, EB)
- V. E. Miles, VPI (AP-c)
- Arthur Tripp, Tennessee (UP-c)
- Bud Shuler, North Carolina (UP-c)
- L. R. Thompson, Mississippi A & M (WMA)

=== Centers ===
- Elvin Butcher, Tennessee (AP-1, UP-2, CP, WMA)
- Vernon Sharpe, Vanderbilt (AP-2, UP-1, WMA)
- Harry Schwartz, North Carolina (AP-c)
- Peter Pund, Georgia Tech (College Football Hall of Fame) (AP-c, C)
- William Patterson, Auburn (AP-c, WMA-r)
- Ike Boland, Georgia (EB)
- Shep Mondy, VMI (WMA-r)

=== Quarterbacks ===
- Bill Spears, Vanderbilt (College Football Hall of Fame) (AP-1, UP-1, C, CP, WMA, EB)
- Johnny Menville, Tulane (UP-2, WMA)
- Babe Godfrey, LSU (WMA-r)

=== Halfbacks ===
- Stumpy Thomason, Georgia Tech (AP-1, UP-1, C, EB)
- Dick Dodson, Tennessee (AP-1, UP-1, WMA-r)
- Jack McDowall, North Carolina State (College Football Hall of Fame) (AP-2 [as qb], UP-2, C, WMA)
- Phoney Smith, Mercer (AP-2)
- Bill Banker, Tulane (College Football Hall of Fame) (AP-2, UP-c)
- Frank Peake, VPI (AP-c)
- Al Barnes, VMI (UP-2)
- Bobby Hooks, Georgia (UP-c, CP, EB)
- Warner Mizell, Georgia Tech (CP)
- John Sloan, Virginia (UP-c)
- Davis Brasfield, Alabama (UP-c)
- Gene White, Washington & Lee (UP-c)
- Fred Linkus, Maryland (UP-c)
- Roy Estes, Georgia (WMA)
- Lewis Thomas, Maryland (WMA)
- Red Brown, Alabama (WMA)
- Bud Eskew, Clemson (WMA-r)
- Reuben Wilcox, Mississippi

=== Fullbacks ===
- Herdis McCrary, Georgia (AP-1, UP-1, C, CP, EB)
- Jimmy Armistead, Vanderbilt (AP-2, UP-c)
- Bill Middlekauff, Florida (AP-c, UP-2, WMA)
- Sollie Cohen, Mississippi (AP-c, WMA)
- Tom Young, North Carolina (AP-c)
- Tom Shotts, Auburn (WMA-r)

== Key ==
Bold = Composite selection

* = Consensus All-American

AP = composite selected by the Associated Press. It had a first and second team.

UP = composite selected by the United Press. It had a first and second team. Those who received selections despite missing first or second team are appended with a C.

C = composite selected by six sporting editors: Blinkey Horn of the Nashville Tennessean, Ralph McGill of the Nashville Banner, Zipp Newman of the Birmingham News, Bib Phillips of the Birmingham Age-Herald, Morgan Blake of the Atlanta Journal, and Ed Danforth of the Atlanta Georgian.

CP = selected by football fans of the South through Central Press newspapers.

WMA = selected by coaches Wallace Wade of Alabama, Dan McGugin of Vanderbilt, and William Alexander of Georgia Tech, for a roster spot on a team set to face an All-Pacific Coast squad in Los Angeles on Christmas Day. It also include reserves.

EB = selected by Miss Emily Boyd, sports editor of the Griffin Daily News, the only woman sports editor in the south.

== See also ==
- 1927 College Football All-America Team
