= History of Ole Miss Rebels football =

The Ole Miss Rebels, the football team of the University of Mississippi, was founded in 1893. The state's first football team, the Rebels currently play in the FBS Subdivision of NCAA Division 1 Football and in the West Division of the Southeastern Conference (SEC).

Ole Miss claims three national championships despite never finishing No. 1 in the AP and Coaches Polls, and won six SEC championships (1947, 1954, 1955, 1960, 1962, 1963).

In 2019, the program received one of the biggest punishments ever issued by the NCAA for recruiting and academic violations: a two-year postseason ban, three years of probation, a four-year ban on certain scholarships, and the erasure of 33 wins from 2010 to 2016.

== Overview ==
=== Early history (1893–1946) ===
In 1890, Dr. Alexander Bondurant, later the dean of the Ole Miss Graduate School, rallied Ole Miss students to help form an athletic department to encompass the sports of football, baseball and tennis. The students brought this initiative to reality and in 1893, with Bondurant as the coach, a football team came to fruition. The first team won four of five games during that inaugural football season with Bondurant as head coach. One of those wins was the very first football game ever played by an Ole Miss team, a 56–0 defeat against Southwest Baptist University of Jackson, Tennessee (now known as Union University). This was on November 11, 1893.

The next year, 1894, Bondurant passed on his coaching duties. Ole Miss Football, a book published in 1980 by Sports Yearbook Company of Oxford, MS, says J.W.S. Rhea was the first coach at Ole Miss having been hired part-time by Bondurant and having led the 1894 team to a 6–1 record. The annual Ole Miss media guide lists C.D. Clark as the coach of the 1894 team and further says about him, "Although it has never been documented, it is thought that C.D. Clark of Tufts was the first paid football coach at Ole Miss. His name appears as manager of the team as shown in the Ole Miss Magazine dated November 1894." The College Football Data Warehouse also lists Clark as the coach for the 1894 team.

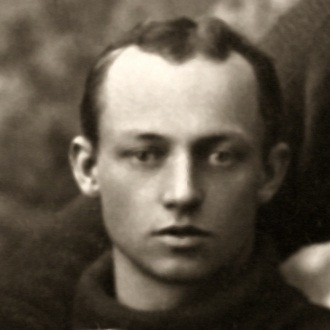
Coach Hollister

In 1896, John W. Hollister led the Rebels to a 1–2 record. Ole Miss did not field a football team in 1897; a yellow fever epidemic cancelled the football season. In 1898 the school joined the Southern Intercollegiate Athletic Association (SIAA). The 1899 team went 3–4 and beat a winless Tulane. The 1900 team did not win a game and played no home games. The 1901 team was coached by Virginia graduate William Shibley, won no conference games, and played in the first Egg Bowl. Auburn graduates Daniel S. Martin and Mike Harvey coached the 1902 and 1903 teams. The 1903 team's one loss was 33–0 to Vanderbilt. The 1904 season was up-and-down, featuring a 69–0 loss to SIAA champion Vanderbilt and 114–0 defeat of Southwest Baptist. Vanderbilt was led by first year head coach Dan McGugin, who is the only coach in NCAA history to win his first three games by 60 points, "The whole South read that 69–0 score and gasped." The 1905 team lost both of its two games, against Cumberland and in the Egg Bowl. All-Southern lineman James C. Elmer caught the first forward pass in the history of the Egg Bowl rivalry in 1906. Elmer's kicking accounted for 13 points in a 29–5 rout.

In Frank A. Mason's only season as head coach, Mississippi went 0–6. In what would be his final game as head coach, Ole Miss faced rival Mississippi A&M on a cold, wet Thanksgiving Day. Before the second half began, Mason brought out an urn filled with whisky-laced coffee in an attempt to warm his players. Sloppy second-half play resulted in a 15–0 Ole Miss loss. After the game, many of the players blamed Mason for the loss and when asked if the team was returning home that night, Mason was quoted as saying "Yes, the team is going north at 11 o'clock. I'm going in another direction, and hope I never see them again!"

Former Vanderbilt quarterback Frank Kyle coached the 1908 team and Ike Knox was selected All-Southern. Grantland Rice wrote “If Knox has been upon a Vanderbilt, Sewanee or Auburn eleven he would more than likely have been hailed as one of the greatest halfbacks of the decade.” Nathan Stauffer served as the head coach for the 1909, 1910 and 1911 seasons. His record at Ole Miss was 17 wins, 7 losses and 2 ties (17–7–2). The 1910 team lost just one game, to SIAA champion Vanderbilt. Guard Earl Kinnebrew was selected All-Southern. Rube Barker and By Walton were All-Southern in 1911, and Pete Shields was in the backfield. Barker, John C. Adams, and Ralph Fletcher were All-Southern in 1912. William L. Driver coached the 1913 team and Barker was team captain. The 1914 team shutout LSU. Former Vanderbilt quarterback Fred A. Robins coached the team from 1915 to 1916, and failed to win a conference game.

During the First World War, Ole Miss was coached by Dudy Noble, the only coach to lose two Egg Bowls in one season. He also coached baseball, and is the namesake of Dudy Noble Field. From 1919 to 1921, Ole Miss football was coached by R. L. Sullivan, who also coached basketball. In 1922 the school joined the Southern Conference (SoCon). Roland Cowell coached the team from 1922 to 1923, and failed to win a conference game. Chester S. Barnard was coach in 1924 and also failed to win a conference game. In February 1925, Homer Hazel signed on to become the head football coach at Ole Miss. Thad Vann, who played for Hazel at Ole Miss from 1926 to 1929, later credited Hazel with "launching the University of Mississippi's rise as a national football power". Hazel coached the team for five years, compiling records of 5–5 in 1925, 5–4 in 1926, 5–3–1 in 1927, 5–4 in 1928, and 1–6–2 in 1929. His five-year record as head football coach was 21–22–3. End Ap Applewhite, guard V. K. Smith and fullback Sollie Cohen were All-Southern in 1927. Gee Walker was on the 1928 team. After the poor showing in 1929, the Ole Miss student body and alumni were reportedly opposed to Hazel's tactics on the football field. Hazel resigned his post at Ole Miss in January 1930.

Leading Ole Miss into the Southeastern Conference in 1933 was head coach Ed Walker, who served as the school's head coach from 1930 to 1937. The Rebels compiled a record of 38–38–8 record under Walker, which included a 9–3 campaign in 1935, which culminated in a loss in the Orange Bowl. The 1936 team was the first to use the nickname "Rebels". Under head coach Harry Mehre, who led the Rebels from 1938 to 1945, the Rebels compiled a record of 39–26–1, which included two 9–2 seasons in 1938 and 1940. In 1943, football was abolished at all Mississippi state-supported institutions by the state college board of trustees due to World War II. On January 14, 1946, the University of Mississippi announced that it had signed Harold Drew to a three-year contract to succeed Mehre as the head football coach for the Ole Miss Rebels. Drew led Ole Miss to a 2–7 record in his one year as head coach.

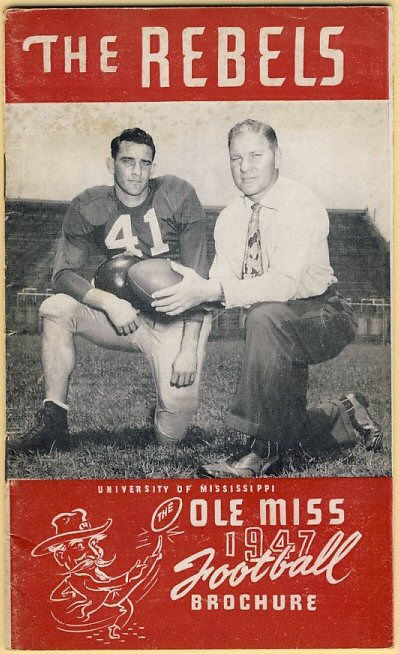
1947 Ole Miss media guide featuring Charlie Conerly (left) and coach Johnny Vaught (right)

=== Johnny Vaught era (1947–1970) ===
Johnny Vaught, a line coach at Ole Miss in 1946 under Drew and a former All-American at Texas Christian University (TCU), remained in Oxford as head coach in 1947 and led the Ole Miss program to national prominence over the next 24 years, posting 23 winning records. In his first season at the helm in 1947, the Rebels posted a 9–2 record and won the first of six SEC crowns (1947, 1954, 1955, 1960, 1962, 1963). That 1947 season also saw Ole Miss great Charlie Conerly become the first Rebel player to be a contender for the Heisman Trophy, placing fourth in the voting for the prestigious honor. Ole Miss won the 1959 Dunkel System national crown, the 1960 Football Writers Association of America, Dunkel System, and Williamson System national championships and the 1962 Litkenhous Ratings national title. Vaught's 1962 squad remains the only undefeated team in Ole Miss football history. Vaught's 1959 squad, which was honored as the "SEC Team of the Decade," was ranked the third best collegiate football team from 1956 to 1995, according to the Jeff Sagarin Ratings released in January 1996.

The Rebels were also among the winningest programs in the country under Vaught during the 1950s and 1960s. From 1950 to 1959, Ole Miss posted an 80–21–5 record (.778 winning percentage). The 77.8 winning percentage was third to only Oklahoma and Miami (OH) during that decade. In the 1960s, Vaught guided the Rebels to a 77–25–6 record and a 74.0 winning percentage, which was the ninth best during that decade. The Rebels 1962 season under Vaught is, to this day, the only undefeated season in Ole Miss history (finishing at 10–0). In the 1950s and 1960s under Vaught, Ole Miss was a fixture in the national polls. The Rebels were ranked atop the Associated Press poll for three weeks during the 1960 season and one week during the 1961 campaign. In 1964, Ole Miss was ranked preseason No. 1 in the Associated Press poll. Vaught also made going to postseason play the norm rather than the exception for the Rebel football program. Ole Miss played in 15 consecutive bowl games from 1957 to 1971 which, at that time, was a national record. In all, Vaught led Ole Miss to 18 bowl game appearances, posting a 10–8 record in those contests. For his efforts, Vaught was named SEC Coach of the Year six times (1947, 1948, 1954, 1955, 1960, 1962).

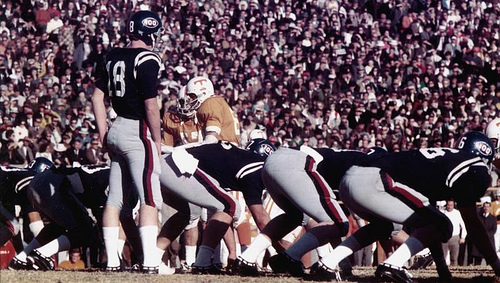
#18 Archie Manning awaiting the snap in a 1969 game against the Tennessee Volunteers

During his time at the helm, Vaught coached some of the best players ever to wear the red & navy blue. In 24 seasons, Vaught produced 18 All-America first teamers. He also coached four players who finished in the top five in the Heisman Trophy voting. Along with Conerly in 1947, Charlie Flowers (5th in 1959), Jake Gibbs (3rd in 1960) and Archie Manning (4th in 1969, 3rd in 1970) were in the running for college football's top honor. Failing health forced Vaught to resign his position in 1970 and the reins of the Ole Miss football program were turned over to Billy Kinard. Vaught is the only coach in Ole Miss history to win an SEC football championship. His 1960 team finished 10–0–1 and was the only major-conference team to go undefeated on the field that year. As a result, it won a share of the national championship; it was awarded the Grantland Rice Award from the Football Writers Association of America after the bowl games. In those days, the wire services crowned their national champion before the bowl games. It is very likely that Ole Miss would have finished atop one poll, if not both, had they been taken after the bowl games as they are today. Vaught took Ole Miss to 18 bowl games, winning 10 times including five victories in the Sugar Bowl. Only two coaches held a winning record against Vaught: Paul "Bear" Bryant, with a record of 7 wins, 6 losses, and 1 tie against Vaught, and Robert Neyland holding a 3 win to two loss advantage. When Vaught took the reins at Ole Miss in 1947, the Rebels were ninth in all-time SEC wins. By the time he retired in 1970, the Rebels had moved up to third, behind only Alabama and Tennessee.

Billy Kinard became the first Ole Miss alumnus to head up the football program after Vaught's resignation. The Rebels went 16–9 under Kinard, including a 10–2 record and a 41–18 Peach Bowl victory over Georgia Tech in his first year in 1971. Kinard's 10 victories are tied for fourth most by a first-year head coach in NCAA Division I history. Kinard coached the Rebels through the 1972 season and through the third game of the 1973 season. After the disappointing 5–5 season in 1972, there was some pressure among the alumni to have Kinard removed. The administration bowed to this pressure after the Rebels started the 1973 season 1–2, including a shutout loss to Missouri, 17–0, and was upset by Memphis, 17–13. Both Billy Kinard and Frank Kinard were fired, and Johnny Vaught was rehired as both the head coach and athletic director. Following the 1973 football season, Vaught resigned once again as head coach, but remained on as athletic director. His final record with the Rebels was 190–61–12. The 190 victories still rank Vaught in the top 25 winningest coaches in NCAA Division I history, and he is the fourth-winningest coach in SEC history. In 1979, Vaught was inducted in the National College Football Hall of Fame.

=== Ken Cooper era (1974–1977) ===
On January 17, 1974, Ken Cooper was announced as the 29th Ole Miss head football coach. An end during his playing days at Georgia from 1955 to 1957 under Wally Butts, Cooper had previously been an assistant coach at Georgia from 1963 to 1970 under Johnny Griffith and Vince Dooley and with the Rebels from 1971 to 1973 under Johnny Vaught and Billy Kinard. Cooper compiled a 21–23 record during his four years as head coach.

Ole Miss finished 3–8 in 1974. They kicked off the season with a 10–0 win over #10 Missouri. After falling to rival Memphis the next week, 15–7, Cooper's team defeated Southern Miss, 20–14. The Rebels then lost a 35-21 contest to #3 Alabama in Jackson, Mississippi. They were shut out by Georgia to the tune of 49–0 on October 12. After a 10–7 loss to South Carolina, the Rebels allowed 24 points in consecutive losses; 24–14 to Vanderbilt and 24–0 in the Magnolia Bowl to LSU. Ole Miss then faced Tennessee in a contest played in Memphis, Tennessee, a game the Volunteers won, 29–17. After losing to archrival Mississippi State, 31–13 in the Egg Bowl, the Rebels concluded the disappointing season with a 26–10 victory over Tulane in New Orleans, Louisiana, a game that had been rescheduled from September due to Hurricane Carmen.

Ole Miss improved to 6–5 in 1975. They lost to Baylor, 20–10 in the season opener. A 7–0 loss to #8 Texas A&M and a 14–3 loss to Tulane before the Rebels recorded their first win of the season with a 24–8 rout over Southern Miss on September 27 The next week, Cooper's team traveled to Birmingham, Alabama and lost to #9 Alabama, 32–6. They got their second win of the season on October 11 with a 28–13 win over Georgia. After a 35–29 loss to South Carolina in Jackson, Mississippi, the Rebels won their final four games to finish the season; topping Vanderbilt (17–7), LSU (17–13), Tennessee (23–6) and Mississippi State (13–7).

The Rebels posted another 6–5 record in 1976. They started the season on a sour note, losing to Memphis, 21–16. Ole Miss rebounded to win their next three; defeating #6 Alabama 10–7, Tulane 34-7 and Southern Miss in a 28–0 shutout. ooper's squad was involved in another shutout the following week, this time losing to Auburn, 10–0. Ole Miss then upset #4 Georgia by a count of 21–17 on October 9. After a 10–7 loss to South Carolina, the Rebels defeated Vanderbilt by a count of 20–3 on October 23. Ole Miss finished the season on a three-game losing streak, beginning with a 45-0 shellacking shutout at the hands of rival LSU in the Magnolia Bowl. On November 13, the Rebels lost to Tennessee, 32–6.b They concluded the season on November 20 with a 28–11 loss to their in-state archrivals, Mississippi State, in Jackson, Mississippi.

Cooper led the Rebels to a third straight 6–5 mark in 1977. They avenged their previous season's loss to Memphis by defeating the Tigers, 7–3 on September 3. Ole Miss lost to #6 Alabama in Birmingham, Alabama by a count of 34–13. In one of the most memorable games in Rebel football history, Ole Miss upset Notre Dame, 20–13 in Mississippi Memorial Stadium on September 17 in Jackson, Mississippi. That loss was the Irish's lone setback of the 1977 campaign, as Notre Dame finished the season with an 11–1 record and claimed both the AP and UPI national titles. The celebration would quickly fade, as the Rebels lost their next three, beginning with a 27–19 loss to Southern Miss. On October 1, Cooper's team lost to Auburn 21-15 and on October 8 they were edged by Georgia 14–13. Ole Miss then recorded a 17–10 win over South Carolina and a 26–14 victory over Vanderbilt. On October 29, the Rebels lost the Magnolia Bowl to LSU, 28–21 after leading the Tigers 21–0 in the second quarter. The next week, Ole Miss thrashed Tennessee, 43–14. The always-heated Egg Bowl capped the season, with the Rebels losing to Mississippi State 18–14.

=== Steve Sloan era (1978–1982) ===
Following the 1977 season, Steve Sloan, the former All-American quarterback at Alabama under Paul "Bear" Bryant, was hired as the new Rebel boss and began his five-year stint in 1978. Sloan arrived in Oxford with head coaching stints at both Vanderbilt and Texas Tech. Sloan posted a 20–34 record from 1978 to 1982.

Ole Miss finished 5–6 in 1978. In the season opener, the Rebels defeated Memphis, 14–7. After a 45–14 blowout loss to #17 Missouri, Mississippi defeated in-state foe Southern Miss by a close 16–13 score. Next, Sloan's team got obliterated by Georgia, 42–3. The Rebels suffered another loss at the hands of Kentucky, 24–17. A third consecutive loss followed on October 21 in the form of an 18–17 nail-biting defeat at the hands of South Carolina. After a 35–10 victory over Vanderbilt, Ole Miss lost to #12 LSU, 30–8. Sloan's Rebels bounced back to win two of their last three games of the season; defeating Tulane, 13–3, losing to Tennessee, 41-17 and beating archrival Mississippi State in the Egg Bowl, 27–7.

The Rebels went 4–7 in 1979. They began the season on September 15, defeating Memphis, 38–34. In the season's second game, the Rebels lost to #9 Missouri, 33–7. The next week, Sloan's team dropped a 38-8 contest to Southern Miss. On October 6, Ole Miss lost to Georgia, 24–21. That was followed by a 14–3 loss to Kentucky. After a 21–14 loss to South Carolina, the Rebels snapped their five-game losing streak by defeating Vanderbilt, 63–28. The next week, the Rebels lost the Magnolia Bowl to LSU, 28–24. After a 49–15 loss to Tulane, Mississippi defeated #19 Tennessee, 44–20. In the season finale, the Rebels won the Egg Bowl over Mississippi State, 14–9.

Mississippi finished 3–8 in 1980. They started the season with a 23–20 loss to Texas A&M. After a 61–7 blowout victory over Memphis, the Rebels were dominated by #1 Alabama, 59–35. The following game saw Ole Miss fall to Tulane, 26–24. After a 28–22 loss to Southern Miss, Mississippi lost to #6 Georgia, 28–21. That was followed by a 15–3 loss to Florida. Sloan's Rebels alternated between win and loss for the season's remaining four games; defeating Vanderbilt by a count of 27–14, losing to LSU, 38–16, defeating Tennessee, 20-9 and losing to #17 Mississippi State, 19–14.

Ole Miss finished 4–6–1 in 1981. In the season opener, they defeated Tulane by a nail biting 19–18. A second straight win followed in the form of a 20–13 win over South Carolina. On September 19, Sloan's team improved to 3–0 on the season with a 7–3 victory over Memphis. In the season's fourth game, the Rebels suffered their first defeat; a 27–13 loss to Arkansas. Next, Ole Miss lost to #11 Alabama, 38–7. That was followed by a 37–7 blowout at the hands of #11 Georgia. On October 17, the Rebels lost to Florida, 49–3. A fifth straight loss came on October 24 in a 27–23 loss to Vanderbilt. Ole Miss broke their losing streak on Halloween with a 27–27 tie with LSU. After a 28–20 loss to Tennessee, Mississippi concluded the season on November 21 with a 21-17 Egg Bowl win over Mississippi State.

The Rebels went 4–7 in 1982. They kicked off the season by defeating Memphis, 27–10. In the second game, Mississippi defeated Southern Miss, 28–19. The Rebels suffered their first loss of the season with a 42–14 defeat at the hands of #4 Alabama. The next week, Ole Miss suffered its second loss, falling to #9 Arkansas, 14–12. After a 33–10 loss to #5 Georgia, Mississippi defeated TCU, 27–9. On October 23, Ole Miss lost to Vanderbilt, 19–10. After a 45–8 blowout loss to LSU, the Rebels obliterated Tulane, 45–14. Mississippi finished the season with consecutive losses; a 30–17 defeat to Tennessee and a 27-10 Egg Bowl contest to Mississippi State. In December 1982, Sloan decided to leave Ole Miss to become the head football coach at Duke.

=== Billy Brewer era (1983–1994) ===
After stepping outside the Ole Miss family football tree the previous nine seasons, Ole Miss looked for a familiar face to lead the football program, and the Rebels found that person when Billy Brewer returned to Oxford to take over as head coach in December 1982. In his first season, Brewer guided the Rebels to their first winning regular season since 1977 with a 7–4 mark (they were subsequently awarded a win over Tulane by forfeit a year later). The Rebels also received their first bowl game invitation since 1971 and met Air Force in the Independence Bowl played in Shreveport, Louisiana. Ole Miss dropped a 9–3 decision to the Falcons and finished with a 7–5 record.

During his 11-year tenure, Brewer led the Rebels to six winning seasons and five bowls, including Ole Miss' 1991 New Year's Day Gator Bowl appearance. The Jan 1 bowl game was the program's first since 1969. Brewer was named SEC Coach of the Year in 1986 (8–3–1 record), which saw the Rebels return to the national rankings for the first time in over a decade and tie for second in the SEC—their highest finish in 11 years. They just missed out on an SEC championship due to a 22–10 loss to Tennessee the second to last game of the season. The next year, the Rebels returned nine starters on both sides of the ball. However, they flopped to a 3–8 record, a severely disappointing mark even considering that they were hobbled by NCAA sanctions for recruiting violations. They were outscored 127–47 in the season's final three games. Following a 35–6 loss to a mediocre Kentucky team that put that year's team at 1–5, an anonymous group of students under the name Students Against Billy Brewer even took out an ad in the university student newspaper calling for Brewer's firing.

The 1988 team, with little expected by most people, defeated Alabama in Tuscaloosa on their homecoming for the first time in history, came from behind to win two more games and looked to be in excellent position to secure a winning season and bowl berth. But the Rebels fell to Tulane in a devastating 14–9 upset on homecoming and also suffered a very heartbreaking loss to a 5–6 Tennessee team at home before rallying to trounce Mississippi State 33–6 in a severe thunderstorm in Jackson. Ole Miss would go 8–4 in 1989, and in the aforementioned 1990 season would notch nine wins and again narrowly miss an SEC title due to a loss to Tennessee. They also made their first appearance in a final media poll since 1971. However, none of the nine wins came against a team with a winning record. Brewer garnered SEC Coach of the Year honors that season. In 1992, Ole Miss posted yet another nine-win season and finished with a national top 15 ranking. But the next year and what turned out to be Brewer's last, Ole Miss would become the first team ever in college football to finish with a losing record (a forfeit from Alabama years later gave the team an in-the-books winning season) despite having the nation's number one team in total defense.

In his 11 seasons, Brewer led Ole Miss to eight Egg Bowl victories over in-state rival Mississippi State. At Ole Miss, Brewer compiled a 67–56–3 record, placing him second on Ole Miss' all-time wins list behind Vaught.

However, Brewer's tenure at Ole Miss was marred by allegations of recruiting improprieties that twice led to run-ins with the NCAA. The Rebels were banned from post-season play and live television for the 1987 season after a two-year investigation found that Ole Miss recruits had received cash and other gifts from boosters. The penalties were a source of embarrassment for Dr. Gerald Turner, then Ole Miss' chancellor and previously the head of the NCAA's President's Commission, and one of the first milestones in Turner's stormy relationship with Brewer. "We have made some mistakes," Brewer said at a news conference following the announcement of the sanctions. "We are being punished for those mistakes, and we do not intend ever to be in this situation again." However, in December 1993, Brewer and Ole Miss were again hit by allegations of recruiting violations. The NCAA would eventually cite the program for 15 transgressions, all of them serious and some of them embarrassingly lurid. An NCAA report said that Ole Miss boosters and coaches had offered recruits gifts, including cash and, in one case, a car. Boosters were also accused of breaking national rules by taking recruits 30 miles outside of Oxford, sometimes to strip clubs in Memphis. Most damningly, the NCAA alleged that Ole Miss officials knowingly allowed the violations to occur, demonstrating a lack of institutional control of the football program. The charges forced athletic director Warner Alford to resign in July 1994. One day later, Turner fired Brewer, granting him 30 days' paid leave but no other severance package for the three years remaining on his contract. Later that year, the NCAA, when announcing severe penalties against the Ole Miss football program, found Brewer guilty of unethical conduct. Specifically, it stated "There was unethical conduct by a former (Ole Miss) head football coach (Brewer), who was found to show a continuing pattern of disregard for NCAA rules in the operation of the football program ((Jackson, MS) Clarion Ledger, November 18, 1994, p.6-7C)." Brewer sued the university for his dismissal, eventually receiving several hundred thousand dollars.

=== Tommy Tuberville era (1995–1998) ===
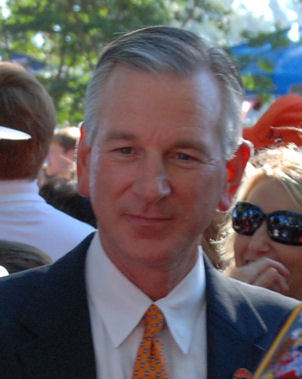
Coach Tuberville

On December 2, 1994, Texas A&M defensive coordinator Tommy Tuberville was selected as the next Rebels head coach. Tuberville had no head-coaching experience, but was one of the nation's premier assistant coaches; he had professional and recruiting ties to Florida and Arkansas.

Tuberville's team went 6–5 in 1995, his first season. The Rebels lost their first game, falling 46–13 to #6 Auburn on September 2. They won the season's second game, 56–10, over I-AA foe Indiana State. In their next five games, they beat Georgia, 18–10; lost to #3 Florida, 28–10; beat Tulane, 20–17; lost to Arkansas in Memphis, Tennessee, 13–6; and lost to #21 Alabama, 23–9 on October 21. Ole Miss won its next two; defeating Vanderbilt, 21–10; and Memphis, 34–3. After a 38–9 blowout loss to LSU, Mississippi defeated Mississippi State in the Egg Bowl, 13–10.

Tuberville's Rebels slipped the next year, finishing 5–6. Ole Miss kicked the season off with a 38–14 victory over I-AA opponent Idaho State. Tuberville's team defeated another I-AA foe the following week; a 31-7 drubbing of VMI. In the third game, the Rebels lost to SEC West foe #15 Auburn, 45–28. After a 20–9 victory over cross-division rival Vanderbilt, Mississippi got dominated by Tennessee in Memphis, 41–3. After a 37–0 shutout loss to #7 Alabama, Ole Miss defeated Arkansas State, 38–21. After a 13–7 loss to rival Arkansas, Mississippi lost the Magnolia Bowl to rival #17 LSU, 39–7. After a 31–27 victory over Georgia, Ole Miss lost the Egg Bowl to archrival Mississippi State in a 17–0 shutout.

That excitement grew in 1997, when Ole Miss recorded its best season since 1992 with an 8–4 record. They began the season with a 24–23 overtime nail biting victory over UCF. In the season's second game, Tuberville led the Rebels to a 23–15 victory over SMU. After a 19–9 loss to #16 Auburn, Ole Miss picked up its third win of the season in the form of a 15–3 victory over Vanderbilt. On October 4, Mississippi lost to #9 Tennessee, 31–17. The next week, Tuberville's team upset #8 LSU, 36–21. After a 29–20 loss to Alabama, Mississippi defeated Arkansas, 19-9 and Tulane, 41–24. After a 21–14 loss to #14 Georgia, the Rebels won a thrilling Egg Bowl over #22 Mississippi State, 15–14. Ole Miss concluded the season with a 34–31 win in the 1997 Motor City Bowl over Marshall The bowl appearance was the program's first since 1992, and the Rebels earned a final national ranking of #22 in both polls.

Ole Miss went 7–5 in 1998. They began the season on September 5, defeating Memphis, 30–10. After a 17–0 shutout loss to Auburn, the Rebels won three straight, defeating Vanderbilt, 30–6, SMU, 48–41 in overtime after trailing by 22 in the game's third quarter, and South Carolina, 30–28. After a 20–17 loss to Alabama, Mississippi defeated Arkansas State, 30-17 and LSU, 37–31 in overtime.

Tuberville's team lost its last three games of the regular season, beginning with a 34–0 shutout at the hands of #11 Arkansas. On November 21, the Rebels lost to #14 Georgia, 24–17. Tuberville's Rebels lost the Egg Bowl to #25 Mississippi State, 28–6. Tuberville, who had accepted the head coaching position at Auburn, did not coach the Rebels in the 1998 Independence Bowl, a game Ole Miss won over Texas Tech, 35–18.

Tuberville was named the SEC Coach of the Year in 1997 by the AP. During his tenure, he acquired the nickname "The Riverboat Gambler" for his aggressive play calling, particularly on fourth down. On November 26, 1998, Tuberville said, "They’ll have to carry me out of here in a pine box," meaning that he would not coach at another school. Two days later, he announced that he had been hired to coach at Auburn.

=== David Cutcliffe era (1999–2004) ===
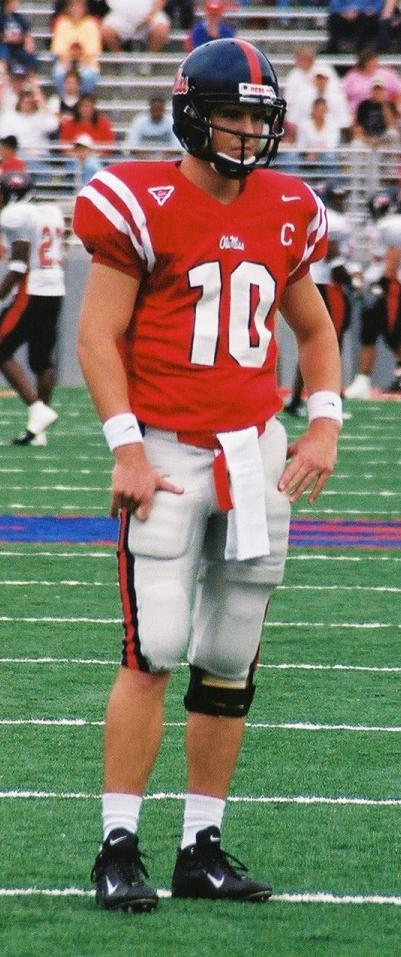
Eli Manning played quarterback for Ole Miss from 2000 to 2003

Tennessee offensive coordinator David Cutcliffe took over as the Rebels head coach on December 2, 1998. Cutcliffe, who coached star quarterback Peyton Manning at Tennessee and helped the Volunteers win the 1998 national championship, brought with him to Oxford a high-powered offensive style that had been successful at Tennessee and energized the Rebel fanbase. During Cutcliffe's tenure, the Rebels played in six bowl games, tied with Arkansas for the most bowl appearances among SEC Western Division schools during that span.

Cutcliffe had four winning seasons in his first five seasons at Ole Miss, in 1999 (8–4), 2000 (7–5), 2001 (7–4) and 2002 (7–6), becoming the first Rebel mentor since Harry Mehre (1938–41) to post winning marks in his first five years. Cutcliffe also directed Ole Miss to four bowl appearances in his first five seasons.

In 2003 Cutcliffe guided the Rebels to a 10–3 overall mark and a share of the SEC West title with eventual BCS National Champion LSU. Following their 31–28 victory over Oklahoma State in the Cotton Bowl, the Rebels finished #13 in the final poll. It was Ole Miss' first New Year's bowl since the 1991 Gator Bowl against Michigan. The most notable player during the Cutcliffe era was undoubtedly quarterback Eli Manning, son of Rebels legend Archie Manning. During his years with Ole Miss, Manning set or tied 45 single-game, season, and career records. His career numbers include 10,119 passing yards (fifth on the SEC career list), 81 touchdown passes (third on the SEC career list), and a passer rating of 137.7 (tied for sixth on the SEC career list). He led the Rebels to a 10–3 record and a 31–28 SBC Cotton Bowl Classic victory over Oklahoma State in 2003 and then was selected with the top overall pick in the 2004 NFL draft. As his senior year came to a close, Manning won many awards including the Maxwell Award as the nation's best all-around player, the Johnny Unitas Golden Arm Award, the National Football Foundation and College Football Hall of Fame Scholar-Athlete Award, the Sporting News Radio Socrates Award, and the SEC Most Valuable Player Award. He was also a candidate for the Heisman Trophy, finishing third in the final voting.

Despite his 44–29 record, five straight winning seasons, and guiding the team to its first 10 win season in over 30 years, Cutcliffe was fired by Ole Miss's athletic director Pete Boone in December 2004 after the team posted a disappointing 4–7 record and three consecutive losses to LSU.

=== Ed Orgeron era (2005–2007) ===
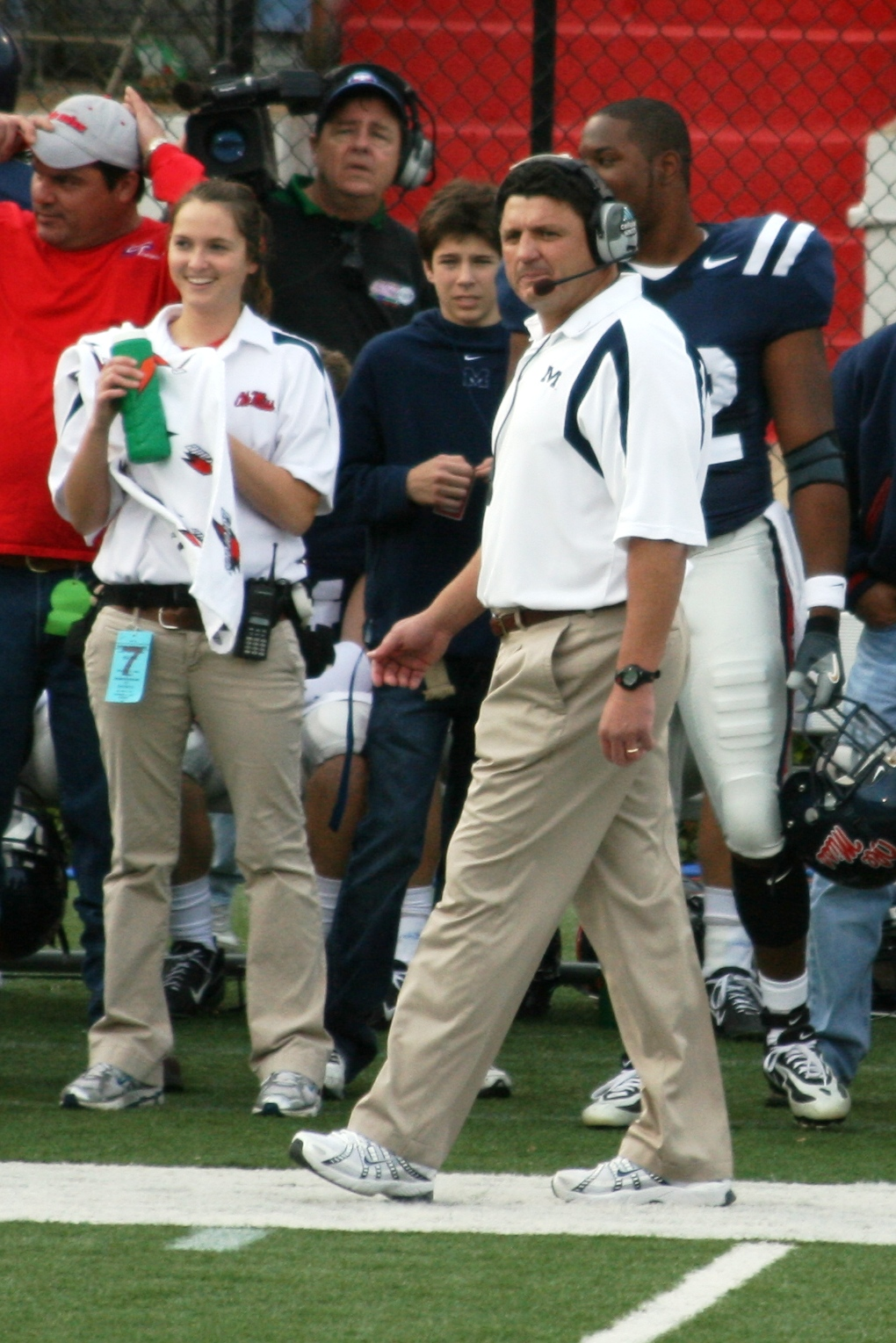
Coach Orgeron

Ed Orgeron, regarded as one of college football's premier defensive line coaches and recruiters, was named the 35th head football coach in the history of the University of Mississippi on December 16, 2004. Orgeron took control of the Ole Miss program after serving the previous seven seasons as defensive line coach at the University of Southern California, and played a role in Pete Carroll's USC championship in 2004.

Entering the 2005 season, Orgeron had hoped to bring a USC-style offense to the Southeastern Conference (SEC), but found limited success. The University of Mississippi's offense finished the season ranked 111th out of 117 Division I-A schools, in total offense; 115th in scoring; and, 116th in rushing. Though Orgeron's defensive experience, along with returning linebacker Patrick Willis, helped the Rebel defense in 2005, the offense always seemed to produce more interceptions than touchdowns. As a result, the 2005 team struggled and finished the season with a record of three wins and eight losses—the Rebels' worst record since 1987.

In response to the results of his first season, Orgeron fired offensive coordinator Noel Mazzone, replacing him with former Miami offensive coordinator Dan Werner. Also, Orgeron hired Art Kehoe, the longtime offensive line coach at Miami; both assistants had just been fired by the Miami. In 2006, Ole' Miss finished the season ranked #108 in scoring offense, #111 in total offense, and #112 in passing offense. Orgeron's second recruiting class in February 2006 was successful, acquiring the written pledges of a national Top 15 signing class. He followed that with the 32nd ranked recruiting class in February 2007.

At Ole Miss, Orgeron recorded only two wins against teams with winning records (the 2005 and 2007 Memphis teams, which both finished at 7–5)—the fewest among active SEC coaches at the time. Until the 2007 season, he enjoyed the public support of the University of Mississippi's chancellor Robert Khayat and other administrators with oversight of the football program, including athletic director Pete Boone. In a November 2006 article in The Clarion-Ledger, Khayat said of Orgeron and the poor win–loss record since he was hired (7–14, at the time of the interview), "I think Coach Orgeron inherited a very difficult situation....I am 100 percent behind him, and I think that people ought to understand that he has a big challenge." In 2007, Ole Miss finished the season 0–8 against fellow SEC teams, and 3–9 overall. It was the program's first winless (conference) season since 1982. On November 24, 2007, after Ole Miss blew a 14-point fourth-quarter lead to in-state rival Mississippi State in the season finale, Orgeron was fired.

=== Houston Nutt era (2008–2011) ===
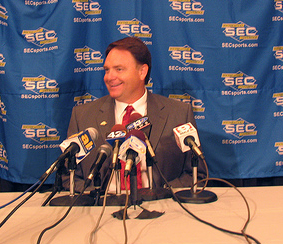
Coach Nutt

On November 28, 2007, just five weeks after having defeated Ole Miss as the head coach at Arkansas, Houston Nutt was named the Ole Miss Rebels 36th head football coach. He signed a four-year, $7.4 million contract. In his first press conference, held at the school's Gertrude Castellow Ford Center for Performing Arts, Nutt said, "One thing I love about Ole Miss is the tradition," naming past players such as Archie Manning, Jake Gibbs, Frank "Bruiser" Kinard, Deuce McAllister and Eli Manning. "That's the reason I am here. I feel like this place can be successful. I feel like this place can win. I can't wait to tell our players this afternoon. That's how you spell fun. The way you spell fun is 'W-I-N.' That's what it is all about."

After a 41–24 victory over border rival Memphis to open the season, the Rebels suffered a loss to the then-ranked Wake Forest Demon Deacons, 30–28, on a last-second field goal. After defeating Samford, Ole Miss lost to the Vanderbilt Commodores at home. After the loss, the Rebels traveled to Ben Hill Griffin Stadium in Gainesville, Florida, where they defeated the #4-ranked, and eventual national champion, Florida Gators, 31–30, after blocking Florida's attempt at a tying extra point and a defensive stop of Florida quarterback Tim Tebow on 4th-and-1. The next weekend, the Rebels lost to South Carolina.

Next on the schedule was Alabama, ranked No. 2 in the nation at the time. During the game, Ole Miss became the first team Alabama trailed in the 2008 season. Alabama ultimately prevailed, however, in the final series of the game, winning, 24–20. Then came Arkansas. Nutt, facing his old team, came out victorious, 23–21. The Rebels followed that with a 17–7 home win against Auburn. On November 15, Ole Miss beat ULM, 59–0, to push their record to 6–4 and become bowl eligible for the first time since 2003. Ole Miss next beat No. 8 LSU, 31–13, in Baton Rouge, snapping a six-game losing streak to the Tigers, earning the Rebels an Associated Press ranking of No. 25, the first time in four years Ole Miss had been ranked. The Rebels went on to beat SEC West and in-state rival Mississippi State, 45–0, in the Egg Bowl to finish the regular season at 8–4. The win over the Bulldogs moved the Rebels up to No. 22 in the AP Poll and landed the team their first ranking of the year in the Coaches' Poll, coming in at No. 25. Ole Miss defeated No. 7 Texas Tech, 47–34, in the Cotton Bowl Classic. On December 5, 2008, Ole Miss and Houston Nutt agreed to terms on a contract extension and raise.

On April 16, 2009, Nutt and his wife Diana announced plans to donate $100,000 to Ole Miss, half of which was to go for athletic scholarships and half to operate the five-year-old, $17 million Indoor Practice Facility. The Ole Miss Rebels began the 2009 season ranked high and with high expectations. After beating Memphis, 45–14, and Southeastern Louisiana, 52–6, which gave Ole Miss the second longest winning streak in the nation at eight games dating back to the 2008 season, Ole Miss climbed as high as No. 4 in the AP Poll before losing their 2009 SEC opener, 16–10, on the road at South Carolina in a Thursday night game on September 24. After the loss, Ole Miss fell 17 spots in the AP Poll, down to No. 21. Ole Miss went on the road again and beat Vanderbilt the next week, 23–7. After a disappointing start and pair of conference losses, they managed to rebound against Arkansas, winning 30–17. Ole Miss went on to beat No. 8 LSU, 25–23, at Oxford. Ole Miss lost to in-state and SEC rival Mississippi State on November 28 in the Egg Bowl at Starkville, 41–27. Ole Miss was picked to play in the Cotton Bowl Classic for the second year in a row, where they defeated Oklahoma State, 21–7, to end the season.

Nutt's Rebels finished 4–8 overall in the 2010 season, including 1–7 in the SEC. Among the worst of these losses was to FCS-member Jacksonville State, which was Ole Miss' first loss to a lower division team since 1945. Adding insult to injury, Nutt suffered his first loss to his former team, as Arkansas defeated Ole Miss 38–24. The crowd at Razorback Stadium in Fayetteville mockingly chanted Nutt's name after the game was over. Nutt was the center of a major recruiting controversy in February 2010. After recruiting 37 players, the SEC was forced to enact the "Houston Nutt Rule": beginning August 1, 2010, "SEC teams will be limited to signing 28 football recruits, with the usual maximum of 25 allowed to enroll in the fall." Nutt was fired as head coach after a dismal 2–10 2011 season, ending a disappointing tenure that had begun with much optimism.

=== Hugh Freeze era (2012–2016) ===
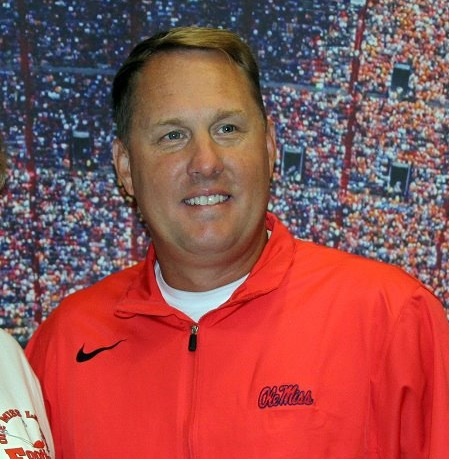
Coach Freeze

On December 5, 2011, Hugh Freeze was announced as the 37th head coach of the Ole Miss Rebels football team. An Oxford native, Freeze was previously the head coach at Arkansas State for one season and had previously been the tight ends coach and recruiting coordinator under Ed Orgeron from 2005 to 2007 and had even interviewed with Orgeron for the Rebels offensive coordinator job.

In 2012 Ole Miss went 7–6 and finished the regular season with a win over rival Mississippi State. The Rebels won their bowl game against Pitt in the BBVA Compass Bowl. On December 13, 2012, Freeze received a one-year contract extension and a $500,000 annual raise. In Freeze's second year, the Rebels went 8–5 (3–5 in the SEC). The 2013 Rebels defeated then-sixth-ranked LSU on a last-second field goal in Oxford and capped off the season with a 25–17 victory over Georgia Tech in the Music City Bowl.

In 2014, Freeze led Ole Miss to one of its strongest seasons in four decades. The Rebels spent most of the season in the top 10, rising as high as third in October—their highest ranking at that late stage in the season in almost half a century. They defeated Alabama at home that October and ultimately finished 9–3, only the third time since Vaught's tenure that a Rebel team has won as many as nine games. This garnered them a berth in the 2014 Peach Bowl against TCU—their first major-bowl appearance since 1969. However, TCU crushed the Rebels, 42–3. On December 2, 2014, Ole Miss agreed to terms with Hugh Freeze on a contract extension and raise. Freeze led to the Rebels to another strong season in 2015, one that featured wins over ranked rivals LSU and Mississippi State, but was headlined by a road victory over then-no.2 Alabama, their first win in Tuscaloosa since 1988 and only the first time they had beaten the Tide in back to back seasons. Ole Miss controlled their own destiny in the SEC West for much of the 2015 campaign, but ultimately finished in second. The Rebels earned a trip to the 2016 Sugar Bowl, their first appearance in this bowl game since 1970, where they beat Oklahoma State 48–20.

In January 2016, the NCAA charged Ole Miss with numerous recruiting violations. An investigation turned up evidence that Ole Miss employees and boosters arranged numerous "impermissible benefits" for players, such as car loans and cash. At least one recruit was suspected of getting help on his college entrance exam. The investigation reopened soon after star offensive tackle Laremy Tunsil admitted taking money from one of Freeze's assistants.

In the 2016 season, the Rebels struggled to a 5–7 record, its first losing season since the year Freeze arrived. After beginning the season at No.11, the Rebels blew a 22-point lead en route to a loss the opening weekend to Florida State. After defeating Wofford the following week, the Rebels blew another three-touchdown lead in a loss to Alabama. After obliterating Georgia and Memphis, the Rebels lost three straight to Arkansas, LSU and Auburn. After defeating Georgia Southern and upsetting then-No. 10 Texas A&M, the Rebels dropped their last two regular season games to Vanderbilt and Mississippi State.

On February 22, 2017, Ole Miss announced it would self-impose a bowl ban for the upcoming season after the NCAA accused the program of numerous violations of organization rules, including a lack of institutional control. That same day, the NCAA sent an updated notice of allegations charging the Rebels with eight more violations. Most seriously, it accused Freeze of not monitoring his assistants, and also accused Ole Miss of not properly controlling the program.

On July 13, 2017, Freeze's predecessor, Houston Nutt, sued Ole Miss for defamation, contending that Freeze and school officials falsely blamed him for the violations. As part of discovery for the lawsuit, Nutt's attorneys filed a Freedom of Information Act request for calls Freeze made on his university-issued cell phone during January 2016. Nutt's attorneys contended that Freeze and others at Ole Miss leaked information to the press as part of an effort to smear their client. While reviewing those records, Nutt's attorneys discovered a call to a number associated with a female escort service, and alerted Ole Miss officials about it. Freeze claimed it was a misdialed number. School officials investigated, and discovered what they later described as "a concerning pattern" of similar calls dating back to shortly after he arrived in Oxford: at least a dozen calls over 33 months. On July 20, chancellor Jeff Vitter and athletic director Ross Bjork gave Freeze an ultimatum: resign or be fired for cause for violating the morals clause of his contract. Freeze opted to resign; offensive coordinator Matt Luke was named interim coach.

=== Matt Luke era (2017–2019) ===
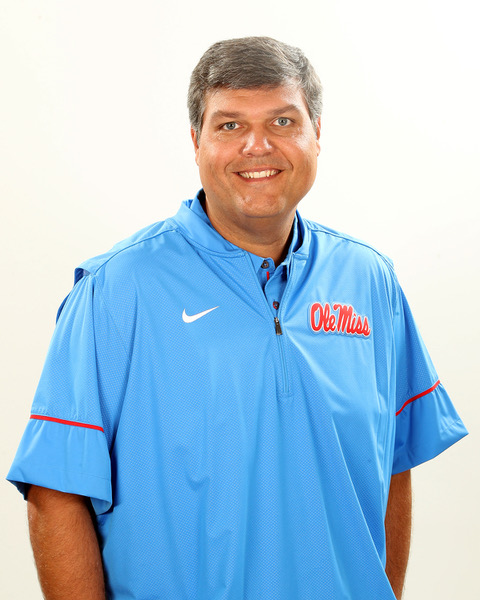
Coach Luke

Co-offensive coordinator/offensive line coach Matt Luke was named interim head coach after Freeze's resignation. Luke had extensive ties to Ole Miss. After a four-year playing career at center from 1995 to 1998 and graduating from Ole Miss in 2000 with a Bachelor of Business Administration, he took a job with Murray State University as an offensive line coach. Following the 2001 season, he returned to Ole Miss to coach offensive line and tight ends under head coach David Cutcliffe. Ole Miss fired Cutcliffe after the 2004 season, but new head coach Ed Orgeron retained Luke as part of his staff. Luke departed Ole Miss in 2006 to be reunited with Cutcliffe at the University of Tennessee, where the latter was the assistant head coach/offensive coordinator. After Cutcliffe took the Duke head coaching job in December 2007, Luke was hired as the team's offensive coordinator/offensive line coach, serving in that capacity until returning to his alma mater to join Hugh Freeze's staff in 2012.

The Rebels finished 6–6 in 2017. They started the season with a 47–27 rout of South Alabama. After a 45–23 victory over FCS opponent Tennessee-Martin, Ole Miss suffered its first loss of the season in a 27–16 defeat at the hands of California, the first time the Rebels faced a Pac-12 Conference team in football in program history. On September 30, the Rebels were obliterated by #1 Alabama in a 66-3 crushing. After a 44–23 loss to #12 Auburn, Ole Miss defeated Vanderbilt, 57–35. After a 40–24 loss to #24 LSU and a heartbreaking 38–37 loss to Arkansas, Ole Miss beat Kentucky in a 37-34 thriller and Louisiana-Lafayette, 50–22. After a 31–24 loss to Texas A&M, the Rebels closed the season with a 31-28 Egg Bowl upset victory over archrival #16 Mississippi State. On November 27, 2017, one day after the thrilling upset over Mississippi State, it was announced that the interim tag would be removed from Matt Luke and that he would be the team's permanent head coach. In February 2019, the NCAA punished the Ole Miss football team for the recruiting and academic violations committed under both Nutt and Freeze. The punishments included a two-year postseason ban, three years of probation, and a four-year ban on some scholarships. As well, the NCAA forced Ole Miss to vacate 33 wins from 2010 to 2016. As a result, 27 of Freeze's wins were stripped from the books; only the 2015 season was unaffected. His record at Ole Miss is now officially 12–15; it was 39–25 on the field. On December 1, 2019, Luke was fired as Ole Miss head coach after three non-winning seasons and a heartbreaking loss to Mississippi State in the 2019 Egg Bowl.

=== Lane Kiffin era (2020–2025) ===
On December 7, 2019, Florida Atlantic head coach Lane Kiffin was named as the next head coach at Ole Miss. Kiffin agreed to a four-year contract worth $16.2 million when he was hired. The 44-year old Kiffin arrived in Oxford with a wealth of coaching experience; prior to serving as the Owls head coach he served as Alabama's offensive coordinator for three years under Nick Saban, winning one national championship along with three SEC championships while helping coach Heisman Trophy winner Derrick Henry. Prior to that, he served as head coach at USC, Tennessee and the NFL's Oakland Raiders.

In his first season as Ole Miss head coach, Kiffin compiled a 5–5 record in an all-SEC Conference schedule, including a 26–20 win over Indiana in the 2021 Outback Bowl in Tampa, Florida. On January 2, 2021; Ole Miss signed Kiffin to a contract extension and raise. In 2021, Kiffin piloted the Rebels to a 10–2 regular-season record, the best regular-season record in school history, going 6–2 in conference and finishing 11th in both major polls. A 21–7 loss to Baylor in the 2022 Sugar Bowl in New Orleans, Louisiana, left the Rebels with a final record of 10–3, only the eighth time in school history that the football team has recorded 10 wins in a season. On December 4, 2021, Ole Miss again extended Kiffin's contract and raised his pay. In 2022, the Rebels compiled an 8–3 record and were ranked #20 in the AP poll in week 12. Running back Quinshon Judkins won C-Spire freshmen OTY. On November 29, 2022, amidst rumors that Auburn was interested in hiring Kiffin to be their new head coach, the Rebels extended Kiffin's contract and increased his pay for the third time since hiring him. Ironically, Auburn ended up hiring former Rebels head coach Hugh Freeze for their head coaching position.

In 2023, the Rebels went 11–2, finishing 2nd in the SEC-West. Their two losses (Week 4 and Week 10, respectively) occurred on September 23, 2023, a 24–10 loss on the road to the then-13th ranked Alabama Crimson Tide, and on November 11, 2023, on the road against the then-2nd ranked and undefeated Georgia Bulldogs, who defeated Ole Miss by a score of 52–17. On December 19, 2023, it was announced that Ole Miss had yet again signed Kiffin to a contract extension, this time with terms not disclosed.

=== Pete Golding era (2025–Present) ===
Pete Golding was the head coach for the first round, quarterfinal, and semifinal playoff games. Most of the coaching staff followed Lane Kiffin to a new school. Golding won the first two games against Tulane and Georgia and played Miami in the semifinal playoff game.
