= Vernon Sharp =

American football player and coach (1906–1991)

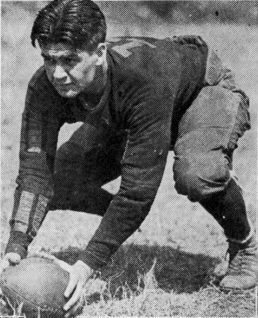

Vanderbilt Commodores
- Position: Center

Personal information
- Born: November 30, 1906; Nashville, Tennessee, U.S.
- Died: April 5, 1991 (aged 84); Brentwood, Tennessee, U.S.
- Listed height: 5 ft 10 in (1.78 m)
- Listed weight: 181 lb (82 kg)

Career information
- College: Vanderbilt (1926–1927)

Awards and highlights
- All-Southern (1927)

Vernon Hibbett Sharp, Jr. (November 30, 1906 – April 5, 1991) was a college football player and coach.

== Early life ==
Vernon Sharp, Jr. was born in Nashville on November 30, 1906 to Vernon Hibbett Sharp and Lorene Seleney Dandridge. His older brother Alfred Sharp was also a Vanderbilt center.

== Vanderbilt University ==
He was a prominent center for Dan McGugin's Vanderbilt Commodores of Vanderbilt University. He was in the same class as the quarterback to whom he snapped the ball, College Football Hall of Fame member Bill Spears.

=== 1927 ===
Sharp was captain of the 1927 team, which included the nation's leading scorer in running back Jimmy Armistead. Sharp received the second most All-Southern votes of any center, behind Elvin Butcher of Tennessee. Sharp arguably had the better season, but was seen as having been outperformed by Butcher in the Vanderbilt–Tennessee game. Sharp was suffering from a knee injury at the time, including the week before against Georgia Tech and Peter Pund. He was called by coach McGugin the greatest Vandy center since Stein Stone.

== Coaching career ==
In 1936, he coached Vanderbilt's freshmen team.
