= Dave McArthur =

American athlete (1904–1948)

David Eriale McArthur Jr.
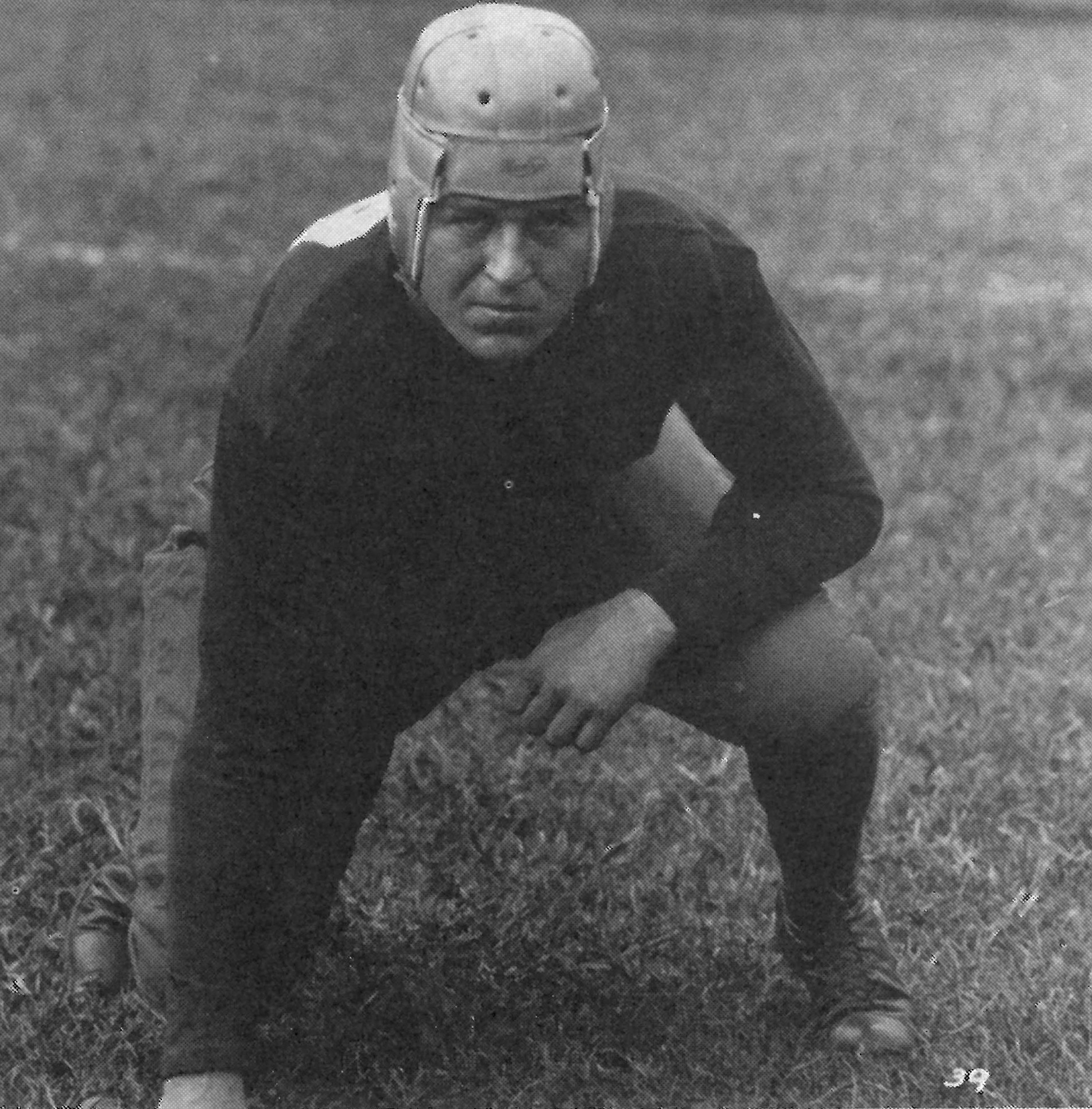
- McArthur from his 1926–27 season
- Born: November 18, 1904; Cumberland Gap, TN, US
- Died: March 9, 1948 (aged 43); Pass-a-Grille, St. Pete Beach, FL, US
- Education: University of Tenn. (1927)
- Occupations: Athlete; mechanic
- Football career

Profile
- Position: Tackle

Career information
- College: Tennessee

Career history
- Akron Pros; Ashland Armcos; Memphis Tigers; Newark Tornadoes

Awards and highlights
- College Football All-Southern (1927)

Signature
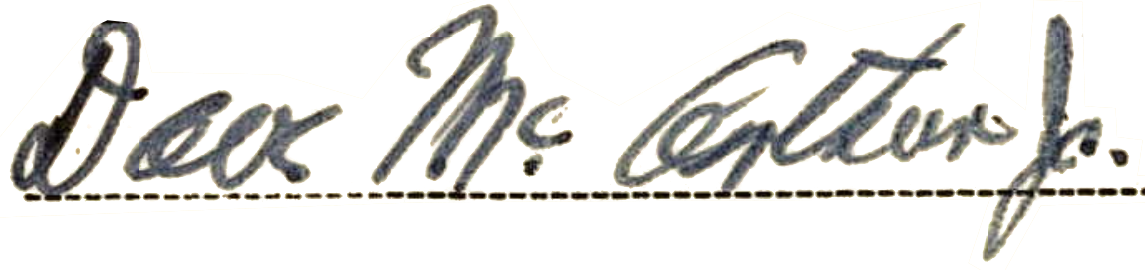

David Eriale McArthur Jr. (November 18, 1904 – March 9, 1948) was a college and professional athlete in the United States.

== Personal life ==
Born on November 18, 1904, in Cumberland Gap, Tennessee, David Eriale McArthur Jr. was the son of David Eriale McArthur Sr. He grew up in Fountain City, Knoxville, became a Boy Scout, and graduated from Central High School, where he was the American football team captain. McArthur graduated from the University of Tennessee (UT) in 1927.

By 1940, he worked with his brother at an automobile repair shop in Pass-a-Grille, St. Pete Beach, Florida. On March 9, 1948, McArthur was found dead in a nearby building, having been shot in the head with a German pistol that was left nearby.

== Football ==
McArthur graduated from the University of Tennessee (UT) in 1927. He played tackle for the Tennessee Volunteers' football program from 1925 through 1927. UT coach Robert Neyland called McArthur one of the best tackles he ever coached. McArthur was one of four Volunteers selected to All-Southern teams that year (joined by UT players guard John Barnhill, halfback Dick Dodson, and center Elvin Butcher). Combative with Dodson, the two faced off after their senior season in an amateur boxing match at Knoxville's Lyric Theater. Knoxville Police Chief Joe Kimsey refereed, and when it was over, McArthur left the theater with a nasal fracture and US$350 (equivalent to $6,487 in 2025).

After college, McArthur played professional gridiron football for the Akron Pros, Ashland Armcos, Memphis Tigers, and Newark Tornadoes.
