= Al Barnes =

Al Barnes may refer to:

- Al Barnes (halfback) (fl. 1926–1927), American football halfback and quarterback
- Al Barnes (wide receiver) (born 1949), American football wide receiver
