= Clark Pearce =

American football tackle

Profile
- Position: Tackle

Personal information
- Born: Winfield, Alabama

Career information
- College: Alabama (1926–1927)

Awards and highlights
- All-Southern (1927)

Clark Pearce was a college football player. He was a tackle for coach Wallace Wade's Alabama Crimson Tide. Pearce blocked a punt against Stanford in the Rose Bowl. Against Mississippi A&M in 1927, Pearce stripped the quarterback and returned the fumble 80 yards for a touchdown.
