= Dick Dodson =

American football player

No. 13
- Position: Halfback/Fullback

Personal information
- Listed weight: 180 lb (82 kg)

Career information
- High school: Peabody Academy
- College: Tennessee (1925–1927)

Awards and highlights
- SoCon championship (1927); All-Southern (1927); 2nd longest run in UT history (91 yds. v. Transylvania (1927))

Richard B. Dodson was a college football player.

== University of Tennessee ==
=== Football ===
Dodson was a running back for the Tennessee Volunteers of the University of Tennessee from 1925 to 1927.

==== 1927 ====
Dan McGugin's Vanderbilt Commodores led 7–0 until a late Dick Dodson run tied the score. He was selected All-Southern in 1927. Dodson was considered the best of Southern backfields along with Bill Spears and Herdis McCrary. That year Dodson set a record with a 91 yard run versus Transylvania. It's still the second longest run in Tennessee history, broken with a 99-yard run by Kelsey Finch against Florida in 1977. In the Tennessee-Vanderbilt game of '27, Dodson carried the ball but four times, yet was the main reason for Tennessee keeping the game a tie.
