= 1927 Sewanee Tigers football team =

American college football season

1927 Sewanee Tigers football
- Conference: Southern Conference
- Record: 2–6 (1–4 SoCon)
- Head coach: M. S. Bennett (5th season)
- Captain: Duke Kimbrough
- Home stadium: Hardee Field

1927 Southern Conference football standings
	Conf.					Overall
Team	W		L		T	W		L		T
Georgia Tech +	7	–	0	–	1	8	–	1	–	1
Tennessee +	5	–	0	–	1	8	–	0	–	1
NC State +	4	–	0	–	0	9	–	1	–	0
Vanderbilt	5	–	0	–	2	8	–	1	–	2
No. 8 Georgia	6	–	1	–	0	9	–	1	–	0
Florida	5	–	2	–	0	7	–	3	–	0
Ole Miss	3	–	2	–	0	5	–	3	–	1
Virginia	4	–	4	–	0	5	–	4	–	0
Clemson	2	–	2	–	0	5	–	3	–	1
Alabama	3	–	4	–	1	5	–	4	–	1
LSU	2	–	3	–	1	4	–	4	–	1
Mississippi A&M	2	–	3	–	0	5	–	3	–	0
Washington and Lee	2	–	3	–	0	4	–	4	–	1
VPI	2	–	3	–	0	5	–	4	–	0
Maryland	3	–	5	–	0	4	–	7	–	0
South Carolina	2	–	4	–	0	4	–	5	–	0
VMI	2	–	4	–	0	6	–	4	–	0
Tulane	2	–	5	–	1	2	–	5	–	1
North Carolina	2	–	5	–	0	4	–	6	–	0
Sewanee	1	–	4	–	0	2	–	6	–	0
Kentucky	1	–	5	–	0	3	–	6	–	1
Auburn	0	–	6	–	1	0	–	7	–	2
+ – Conference co-champions; Rankings from Dickinson System

The 1927 Sewanee Tigers football team was an American football team that represented the Sewanee: The University of the South as a member of the Southern Conference during the 1927 college football season. Led by M. S. Bennett in his fifth season as head coach, the Tigers compiled an overall record of 2–6 with a mark of 1–4 in conference play.

== Schedule ==
Date	Opponent	Site	Result	Attendance	Source
September 24	Transylvania*	Hardee Field; Sewanee, TN	W 34–6		
October 1	Bryson College*	Hardee Field; Sewanee, TN	L 0–7		
October 8	at Texas A&M*	Fair Park Stadium; Dallas, TX	L 0–18	6,000	
October 22	at Alabama	Rickwood Field; Birmingham, AL	L 0–24		
October 29	Ole Miss	Hardee Field; Sewanee, TN	L 14–28		
November 5	at Tennessee	Shields–Watkins Field; Knoxville, TN	L 12–32		
November 12	at Tulane	Tulane Stadium; New Orleans, LA	W 12–6	9,000	
November 24	at Vanderbilt	Dudley Field; Nashville, TN (rivalry)	L 6–26		
*Non-conference game
