= Duke Kimbrough =

American football tackle

Profile
- Position: Tackle

Career information
- College: Sewanee (1927)

Awards and highlights
- All-Southern (1927)

Duke Kimbrough was a college football player. He played as a tackle for the Sewanee Tigers, captain of the 1927 team. He was selected All-Southern.
