= Dick Abernathy =

American football player

Profile
- Positions: Tackle, End

Personal information
- Born: November 28, 1905; Blue Creek, Tennessee, U.S.
- Died: April 24, 1977 (aged 71); Tennessee, U.S.
- Listed height: 6 ft 2 in (1.88 m)
- Listed weight: 203 lb (92 kg)

Career information
- College: Vanderbilt (1927–1929)

Awards and highlights
- Third-team All-American (1928); All-Southern (1928, 1929)

William Richard "Ab" Abernathy (November 28, 1905 – April 24, 1977) was an American college football player. Abernathy was from Blue Creek, near Pulaski, Tennessee.

== Vanderbilt University ==
He was a prominent tackle and end for Dan McGugin's Vanderbilt Commodores of Vanderbilt University from 1927 to 1929.

=== 1928 ===
In 1928, Abernathy began the season with two touchdown catches against Chattanooga in a 20–0 win. He also caught a 38–yard touchdown pass that helped Vanderbilt defeat Colgate 12–7. In Dallas, Abernathy blocked a punt that was recovered in the end zone. The resulting touchdown gave the Commodores' a 13–12 win over Texas. At year's end he was selected All-American.

== Chautauqua ==
Abernathy advertised Redpath Chautauqua.
