= Bill Brunson =

American football center

Mississippi State Bulldogs
- Position: Center

Career information
- College: Mississippi A&M (1927)

Awards and highlights
- All-Southern (1927)

Bill Brunson was a college football player for the Mississippi A&M Aggies, captain of the 1927 team, and selected All-Southern.
