= Glenn Lautzenhiser =

American football player (1906–2003)

No. 1
- Position: Tackle

Personal information
- Born: March 7, 1906; Akron, Ohio, U.S.
- Died: February 23, 2003 (aged 96); Columbus, Mississippi, U.S.

Career information
- High school: Technical
- College: Georgia (1926–1928)

Awards and highlights
- All-Southern (1927, 1928)

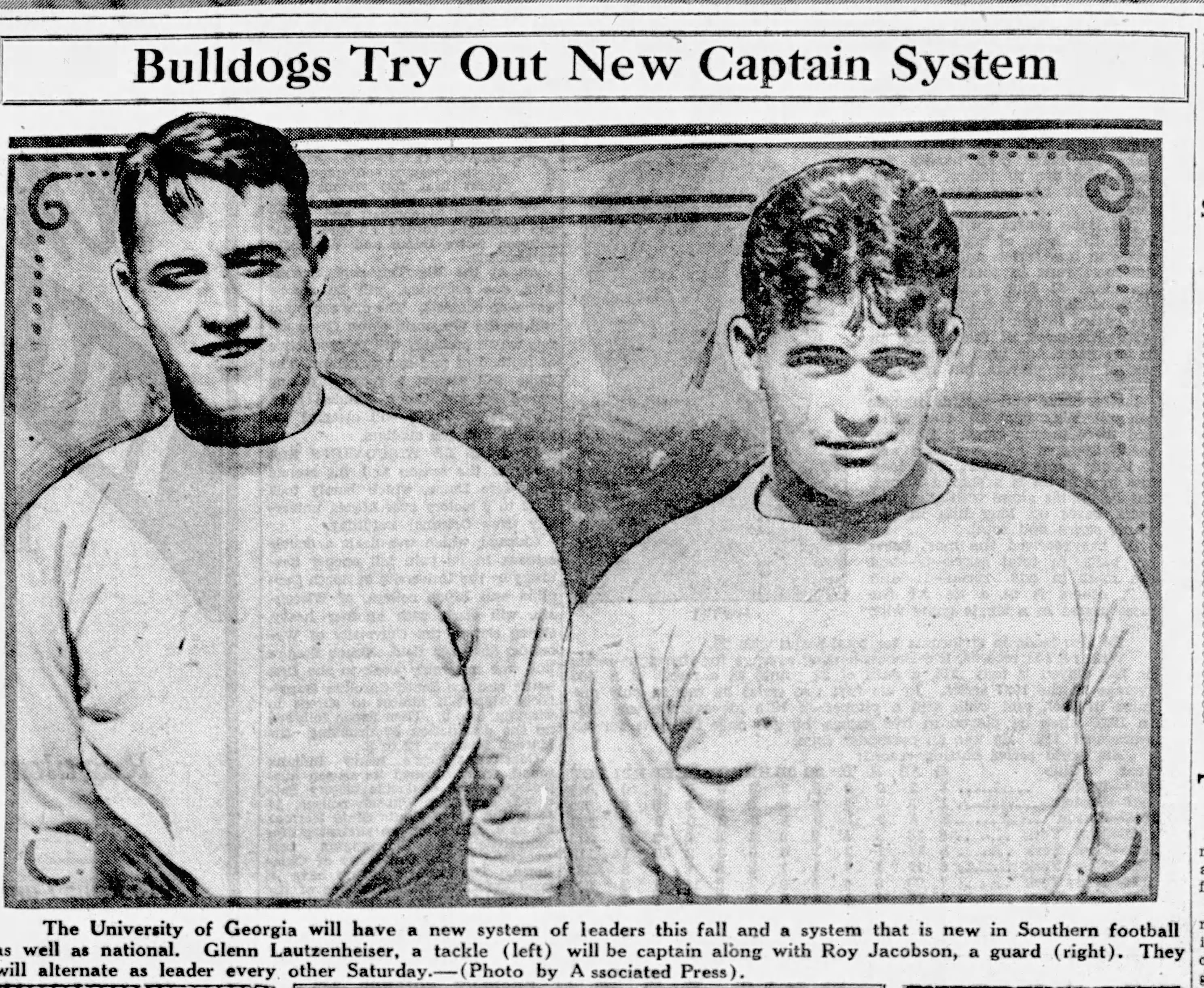
Glenn Lauzenheister (left) and Roy Jacobson during their time as college football players at the University of Georgia

Glenn B. Lautzenhiser (March 7, 1906 – February 23, 2003) was a college football player.

== Early life ==
Glenn was born on March 7, 1906, in Akron Ohio to Willis Lautzenhiser and Louisa Bruse. He attended old Tech High School in Atlanta, Georgia.

== College ==
Lautzenhiser attended the University of Georgia, competing in football, basketball, baseball and track from 1926 to 1928. Lautzenhiser was an All-Southern right tackle, a member of the "Dream and Wonder team" of 1927. One account reports Lautzenhiser played with a "tremendous ferocity." He was co-captain of the 1928 team along with guard Roy Jacobson. He quit the team in 1929 to devote more time to studies.

== After college ==
After his career at Georgia, Lautzenhiser worked for Coca-Cola, Goodyear Tires and a plastics company in Memphis, Tennessee. He was honored in 2000 as Georgia's oldest living letterman. He worked for Goodyear for more than 40 years.
