= 1928 College Football All-Southern Team =

American all-star college football team

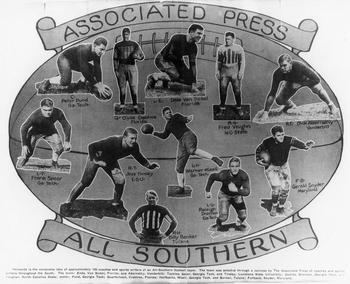
The Associated Press composite selection pictured.

The 1928 College Football All-Southern Team consists of American football players selected to the College Football All-Southern Teams selected by various organizations for the 1928 Southern Conference football season. Georgia Tech won the Southern and national championship.

== Composite eleven ==
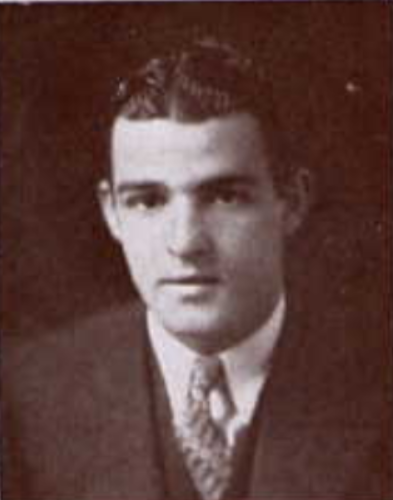
Dale Van Sickel.

The All-Southern eleven compiled by the Associated Press included:

- Dick Abernathy, end for Vanderbilt. Abernathy began the season with two touchdown catches against Chattanooga in a 20–0 win. He also caught a 38–yard touchdown pass that helped Vanderbilt defeat Colgate 12–7. In Dallas, Abernathy blocked a punt that was recovered in the end zone. The resulting touchdown gave the Commodores' a 13–12 win over Texas. He was selected first-team All-America by the Central Press Association, billed as the "Real" All-American team
- Bill Banker, halfback for Tulane, second-team UP All American. He was inducted into the College Football Hall of Fame in 1977.
- Clyde Crabtree, quarterback for Florida, third-team All-American. The ambidextrous Crabtree led the "Phantom Four" backfield which led the nation in scoring.
- Raleigh Drennon, guard for Georgia Tech, one of the tacklers of Roy Riegels on his wrong way Rose Bowl run.
- Warner Mizell, halfback for Georgia Tech, second-team All-America.
- Peter Pund, center and captain for Georgia Tech, consensus All-American. Pund was never penalized and was inducted into the Hall of Fame in 1963. "I sat at Grant Field and saw a magnificent Notre Dame team suddenly recoil before the furious pounding of one man–Pund, center," said legendary coach Knute Rockne. "Nobody could stop him. I counted 20 scoring plays that this man ruined."
- Gerald Snyder, fullback for Maryland, third-team All-American. Snyder started the season expecting to be elected team captain, but had been suspended for off-field behavior by head coach Curley Byrd
- Frank Speer, tackle for Georgia Tech, first-team AP All-American. He was later a professional wrestler.
- Jess Tinsley, tackle for LSU, cousin of Gaynell Tinsley. He played in the NFL for the Chicago Cardinals.
- Dale Van Sickel, end for Florida. He was his school's first All-American, and was later a Hollywood stuntman.
- Fred Vaughan, tackle for NC State. One account reads "Vaughan is noted for his consistent playing week after week. He always is depended on and never fails to play his usual steady game. He is the main gun in the State line."

== All-Southerns of 1928 ==
=== Ends ===
- Dale Van Sickel, Florida (College Football Hall of Fame) (AP-1, UP-1, NH-1, JC, WNT)
- Dick Abernathy, Vanderbilt (AP-1, NH-1, WNT)
- Frank Waddey, Georgia Tech (AP-2, UP-1, JC)
- Tom Jones, Georgia Tech (AP-2, UP-3)
- Dick Abernathy, Vanderbilt (UP-2)
- Herc Alley, Tennessee (UP-2)
- Paul Hug, Tennessee (NH-2)
- Dennis Stanley, Florida (NH-2)
- Harrison Flippin, Virginia (UP-3)

=== Tackles ===
- Frank Speer, Georgia Tech (AP-1, UP-1, NH-2, JC)
- Jess Tinsley, LSU (AP-1, UP-2)
- Glenn Lautzenhiser, Georgia (AP-2, UP-3, NH-1)
- Vance Maree, Georgia Tech (AP-2, NH-1, JC)
- Lehman Lusky, Vanderbilt (UP-2)
- Gordy Brown, Texas (WNT)
- Jake Williams, TCU (WNT)
- Harry Thayer, Tennessee (NH-2)
- Bill Drury, Kentucky (UP-3)

=== Guards ===
- Fred Vaughan, North Carolina State (AP-1, UP-3, NH-1)
- Raleigh Drennon, Georgia Tech (AP-1, UP-2, NH-2)
- Bull Brown, Vanderbilt (AP-2, UP-1, JC)
- Ellis Hagler, Alabama (AP-2, UP-1 [as T])
- Jimmy Steele, Florida (UP-1, NH-1, JC)
- Arthur Tripp, Tennessee (UP-2, WNT)
- Choc Sanders, SMU (WNT)
- R. M. Hall, Clemson (NH-2)
- "Farmer" Johnson, Tennessee (UP-3)

=== Centers ===
- Peter Pund*, Georgia Tech (College Football Hall of Fame) (AP-1, UP-1, NH-2, WNT)
- Harry Schwartz, North Carolina (AP-2, UP-3)
- O. K. Pressley, Clemson (UP-2, NH-1, JC)

=== Quarterbacks ===
- Clyde "Cannonball" Crabtree, Florida (AP-1, UP-1, NH-1, JC, WNT)
- Jimmy Armistead, Vanderbilt (AP-2, UP-3, NH-2 [as hb])
- Roy Witt, Tennessee (UP-2, NH-2)

=== Halfbacks ===
- Warner Mizell, Georgia Tech (AP-1, UP-1, NH-1, JC, WNT)
- Billy Banker, Tulane (College Football Hall of Fame) (AP-1, UP-1, NH-1, WNT)
- Gene McEver, Tennessee (College Football Hall of Fame) (AP-2, UP-1 [as fb], NH-2)
- Frank Peake, VPI (AP-2, UP-3)
- Gee Walker, Mississippi (JC)
- Red Bethea, Florida (NH-2)
- Stumpy Thomason, Georgia Tech (NH-2)
- Buddy Hackman, Tennessee (UP-3)

=== Fullbacks ===
- Gerald Snyder, Maryland (AP-1, UP-2 [as hb])
- Tony Holm, Alabama (AP-2, UP-2 [as hb])
- Roy Lumpkin, Georgia Tech (UP-2, NH-1, JC)
- Hershel Burgess, Texas A&M (WNT)
- White, Washington & Lee (NH-2)
- Will Covington, Kentucky (UP-3)

== Key ==
Bold = Composite selection

* = Consensus All-American

AP = composite selection of more than one hundred sports writers and coaches compiled by Associated Press. It had a first and second team.

UP = composite selection compiled by the United Press. It had a first, second and third team.

NH = selected by Nash Higgins, chief football scout and assistant coach for the University of Florida. It had a first and second team. Higgins also coached track and field.

JC = selected by Josh Cody, coach at Clemson College, assisted by Joe Guyon.

WNT = posted in the Waco News Tribune.

== See also ==
- 1928 College Football All-America Team
