= Frank Peake =

American football player (1903–1978)

Virginia Tech Hokies
- Position: Halfback
- Class: 1929

Personal information
- Born: May 15, 1903; Virginia
- Died: January 15, 1978 (aged 74); Hampton, Virginia

Career information
- High school: Hampton
- College: V. P. I. (1925–1928)

Awards and highlights
- All-Southern (1927, 1928); Virginia Sports Hall of Fame; Virginia Tech Sports Hall of Fame

Frank W. Peake (May 15, 1903 – January 15, 1978) was a college football running back for the Virginia Tech Hokies of Virginia Polytechnic Institute. Peake's College Football Hall of Fame coach Andy Gustafson, said he never saw his equal as a punt returner. Peake was voted into the Virginia Sports Hall of Fame in 1978, and the Virginia Tech Sports Hall of Fame in 1983, the second year Tech athletes were honored. He was also an accomplished track star.

== Early life ==
Frank Peake was born on May 15, 1903, in Virginia to John James Peake and Sarah Lena Darden.

== Virginia Tech ==
=== Freshman year and the Pony Express ===
After Virginia Tech’s freshman team won a game by a wide margin in 1925, a sports publicist nicknamed the team’s offensive backfield the “Pony Express”, taking off on Notre Dame’s famed “Four Horsemen.” The leader of that group was Frank Peake. He was joined by Scotty MacArthur, Herbert “Mac” McEver and Tommy Tomko.

=== Sophomore year ===
Peake was a fleet back who loved the open field. He scored three touchdowns in his first varsity game against Roanoke College and two more in the next game against Hampden-Sydney. When the Techmen played VMI in the season finale, he scored both touchdowns in Tech’s 14-7 victory. One account claims he rolled up 675 yards on Virginia.

=== Junior year ===
In the 6 to 0 upset of the Colgate Red Raiders in New York, Peake ran for nearly 200 yards and scored the game's only points. During one three-game stretch, he accumulated rushing and return yardage of 306, 314 and 353 yards. He was credited with gaining 1,761 yards in eight games. 930 were from scrimmage, and 831 on punts and kickoffs.

=== Senior year ===
Frank Peake was selected All-Southern in 1928. In the game against Virginia he came off the sideline with an injured hip to return a punt for a touchdown.
