= Garrett Morehead =

American football tackle

North Carolina Tar Heels
- Position: Tackle

Career information
- College: North Carolina (1927)

Awards and highlights
- All-Southern (1927)

Garrett Morehead was a college football player for the North Carolina Tar Heels, captain of the 1927 team, and selected All-Southern.
