= Bill Banker =

American football player (1907–1985)

- "The Blonde Blizzard" c. 1929

No. 18
- Position: Halfback

Personal information
- Born: April 4, 1907; Lake Charles, Louisiana, U.S.
- Died: September 25, 1985 (aged 78); New Orleans, Louisiana, U.S.

Career information
- College: Tulane (1927–1929)

Awards and highlights
- SoCon champion (1929); NFF Distinguished American Award; First-team All-American (1929); Second-team All-American (1928); 3× All-Southern (1927, 1928, 1929); Tulane Sports Hall of Fame; Louisiana Sports Hall of Fame
- College Football Hall of Fame

Willis Burton "Bill" Banker (April 4, 1907 – September 25, 1985) was an American college football player and one-time vice president of Pinnacle Oil Co. His younger brother Buddy Banker was also an athlete.

== Tulane University ==
Banker was a prominent halfback for the Tulane Green Wave football team of Tulane University from 1927 to 1929, in the last leading Tulane to an undefeated season. He was known as the "Blond Blizzard" due to his blond hair and playing without a helmet.

During the 1929 game with Georgia Tech, Banker wore a helmet onto the field because coach Bernie Bierman threatened to yank him out of the game. But the helmet slipped over his eyes as the Yellow Jackets were preparing to kickoff, so Banker tossed it to the sideline, and was never taken out, calling Bierman's bluff. He was featured as part of the All-American football team in the 1930 Warner Bros. feature movie Maybe It's Love starring 20-year-old Joan Bennett and comedian Joe E. Brown.

Banker once held Tulane's school records for career scoring (263 points), career touchdowns (37), career rushing yards (2,516), touchdowns in a single game (4), most rushes in a career (515), most rushes in a game (43) and average yards rushing in a game (93.2). Banker was a charter member of the Tulane Athletics Hall of Fame. He was elected to the College Football Hall of Fame in 1977, and the Louisiana Sports Hall of Fame in 1978.

== Death ==
Banker died of a heart attack on September 25, 1985.
