= Raleigh Drennon =

American football player (1908–1965)

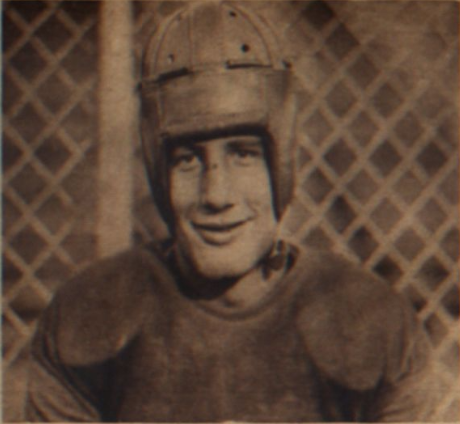
- Drennon in 1927

No. 10, 13, 51
- Position: Guard

Personal information
- Born: September 21, 1908; Atlanta, Georgia, U.S.
- Died: February, 1965; Norfolk, Virginia, U.S.
- Listed height: 5 ft 10 in (1.78 m)
- Listed weight: 180 lb (82 kg)

Career information
- College: Georgia Tech (1926–1928)

Awards and highlights
- National champion (1928); SoCon champion (1927, 1928); All-Southern (1927, 1928); Georgia Tech Athletics Hall of Fame

Raleigh Eugene Drennon (September 21, 1908 – February, 1965) was a college football player.

== Georgia Tech ==
Drennon was a prominent guard for the Georgia Tech Yellow Jackets of the Georgia Institute of Technology. Drennon is a member of the Georgia Tech Athletics Hall of Fame.

=== 1928 ===
Drennon was a member of the national champion 1928 team, selected All-Southern that year. Coach William Alexander called him the "best all around guard that ever put a cleat into Grant Field."

He received an appointment to West Point in 1930.
