= Harry Schwartz (American football) =

American football player (1906–1970)

Profile
- Position: Center

Personal information
- Born: October 11, 1906; New York, U.S.
- Died: March 6, 1970 (aged 63); Charlotte, North Carolina, U.S.
- Listed height: 5 ft 10 in (1.78 m)
- Listed weight: 180 lb (82 kg)

Career information
- College: North Carolina (1926–1928)

Awards and highlights
- All-Southern (1927, 1928)

Harry Louis Schwartz (October 11, 1906 – March 6, 1970) was an American college football player.

== University of North Carolina ==
He was a prominent center for the North Carolina Tar Heels of the University of North Carolina, captain of the 1928 team. He was a native of Charlotte. '28 was a rough year, opening with a 65 to 0 defeat of Wake Forest. One account going into a game against Harvard reads "The team is built around its captain and center, Harry Schwartz, almost universally chosen as all Southern center in 1927. This is Schwartz's third year in intercollegiate competition and his wealth of experience combined with natural leadership abilities will go a long way towards keeping the team together as a fighting unit." Schwartz twice received All-Southern honors. Fuzzy Woodruff once wrote, "Schwartz is beyond any question or cavil the best defensive center in the South. He makes as many tackles on the ends as the ends or halfbacks. He is everywhere. He wears a moustache and it doesn't hurt him. Apparently he never gets tired. He's everything that a good footballer is expected to be." At UNC Schwartz was a member of the first Jewish fraternity on the North Carolina campus, Tau Epsilon Phi.
