= Phoney Smith =

American football player (1905–1985)

Profile
- Position: Halfback

Personal information
- Born: June 26, 1905; Fayetteville, Tennessee, U.S.
- Died: October 27, 1985 (aged 80); Pompano Beach, Florida, U.S.

Career information
- College: Mercer (1925–1927)

Awards and highlights
- All-Southern (1927); Georgia Sports Hall of Fame; Mercer Athletics Hall of Fame; Mercer's all-time leading scorer (176 points)

Joseph Farrar "Phoney" Smith (June 26, 1905 – October 27, 1985) was an American college football player and high school coach and athletic director.

== Mercer University ==
"Phoney" was a prominent halfback for the Mercer Baptists of Mercer University. His brother was Crook Smith. He was elected to the Mercer Athletics Hall of Fame in 1971, and the Georgia Sports Hall of Fame in 1969. Smith was a teammate of later Georgia coach Wally Butts and played for coach Bernie Moore.

=== 1927 ===
Smith was selected All-Southern in 1927. called by one writer "the best athlete who ever put on a Mercer uniform." Smith was the first Southern player to cross the goal line against the "dream and wonder" team of Georgia on a 95-yard kickoff.

== Semi pro ball ==
In the late 1920s, he went on to play semi-pro football with the Ironton Tanks in Ironton, Ohio, a team that was the forerunner of the Cleveland Browns.

== South Broward ==
Smith was a coach and athletic director at South Broward High School, where he taught for more than 20 years.
