= Fred Vaughan =

American football player (1904–1986)

Profile
- Position: Guard

Personal information
- Born: October 8, 1904; Roanoke Rapids, North Carolina, U.S.
- Died: October 16, 1986 (aged 82); Tarboro, North Carolina, U.S.
- Listed weight: 196 lb (89 kg)

Career information
- College: North Carolina State (1927–1928)

Awards and highlights
- SoCon championship (1927); All-Southern (1928)

Fredrick Pierce Vaughan (October 8, 1904 – October 16, 1986) was an All-Southern college football guard for the North Carolina State Wolfpack of North Carolina State University. One account reads "Vaughan is noted for his consistent playing week after week. He always is depended on and never fails to play his usual steady game. He is the main gun in the State line."

== Early life ==
Fred Vaughan was born on October 8, 1904, in Roanoke Rapids, North Carolina, to Cornelius R. Vaughan and Carry Bell Gray.
