= Jess Tinsley =

American football player (1908–1955)

No. 2, 21, 31
- Positions: Tackle, end

Personal information
- Born: October 18, 1907; Homer, Louisiana, U.S.
- Died: March 4, 1955 (aged 47); Ruston, Louisiana, U.S.
- Listed height: 6 ft 0 in (1.83 m)
- Listed weight: 201 lb (91 kg)

Career information
- High school: Homer (Homer, Louisiana)
- College: LSU

Career history
- Chicago Cardinals (1929–1933); Louisville Bourbons (1934)

Awards and highlights
- Honors: 2× All-Southern (1927, 1928); Second-team All-Time LSU football team (1935)

Jess Dalton Tinsley (October 18, 1907 – March 4, 1955) was an American football tackle and end in the National Football League (NFL). A native of Homer, Louisiana, Tinsley played college football at Louisiana State University for the LSU Tigers, where he was selected All-Southern. Jess was selected second-team for LSU's All-Time football team in 1935. It claimed he "turned into a master tackle in senior year." Jess was the cousin of future LSU football star Gaynell Tinsley.

In the NFL, he played for the Chicago Cardinals. He also played in the early American Football League for the Louisville Bourbons. Despite the AFL existing for only one season, it had two All-League teams, one selected by Associated Press writers in the cities represented by the AFL teams and one selected by the coaches of the American Football League. Tinsley made the AP Team.

Tinsley later operated a chain of movie theaters in Jonesboro, Louisiana. He died on March 4, 1955, at his home in Ruston, Louisiana.
