= Peter Pund =

American football player (1907–1987)

- Pund, "The Yellow Assassin", c. 1929

No. 15, 47, 71
- Position: Center

Personal information
- Born: January 27, 1907; Augusta, Georgia, U.S.
- Died: October 17, 1987 (aged 80); Darien, Connecticut, U.S.
- Listed height: 6 ft 0 in (1.83 m)
- Listed weight: 182 lb (83 kg)

Career information
- High school: Richmond Academy
- College: Georgia Tech (1927–1928)

Awards and highlights
- National champion (1928); 2× SoCon champion (1927, 1928); Consensus All-American (1928); 2× All-Southern (1927, 1928); Tech All-Era Team (William Alexander Era); Georgia Sports Hall of Fame (1977)
- College Football Hall of Fame (Class of 1963)

Henry Rudolph "Peter" Pund (January 27, 1907 – October 17, 1987) was an American college football player. He was elected to the Georgia Tech Hall of Fame in 1958, the Georgia Sports Hall of Fame in 1977, and the College Football Hall of Fame in 1963. Pund was never penalized. At Georgia Tech, he was a member of the Sigma Alpha Epsilon fraternity.

== Biography ==
A native of Augusta, Pund was captain of the national champion 1928 Golden Tornado. "I sat at Grant Field and saw a magnificent Notre Dame team suddenly recoil before the furious pounding of one man–Pund, center," said legendary coach Knute Rockne. "Nobody could stop him. I counted 20 scoring plays that this man ruined." After the 1929 Rose Bowl, Pund called "Wrong way" Roy Riegels "the best center I have played against all year. He's a battler, and he never quit."

Pund died September 17, 1987, in Darien, Connecticut. He was cremated. There is a marker for him at Magnolia Cemetery in Atlanta, Georgia.
