= Al Barnes (halfback) =

American football halfback

Profile
- Position: Halfback

Career information
- College: V.M.I. (1926–1927)

Awards and highlights
- All-Southern (1927)

Al Barnes was a college football player, a triple threat halfback for the VMI Keydets, selected All-Southern in 1927. He played quarterback on the McKeesport Olympics.
