= Arthur Tripp =

American football player

No. 27
- Position: Guard

Career information
- College: Tennessee (1926–1928)

Awards and highlights
- All-Southern (1928)

Arthur Tripp was a college football player. He was a prominent guard for the Tennessee Volunteers football team of the University of Tennessee from 1926 to 1928. Tripp was selected All-Southern in 1928.
