= V. K. Smith =

American football player

Profile
- Position: Guard

Personal information
- Listed weight: 190 lb (86 kg)

Career information
- College: Ole Miss (1925–1927)

Awards and highlights
- All-American Honorable Mention (1927); All-Southern (1927)

Vardaman Kimball Smith was a college football player.

== Ole Miss ==
He was a prominent guard for the Ole Miss Rebels football team of the University of Mississippi. He was also captain of the track team.

=== 1927 ===
Smith starred in the first Egg Bowl with a trophy. He "broke through repeatedly and held his post in violate to Aggie thrusts;" opening holes for Sollie Cohen. Smith was selected All-Southern. He was given honorable mention on the All-America team.
