= Ivey Shiver =

American football and baseball player (1907–1972)

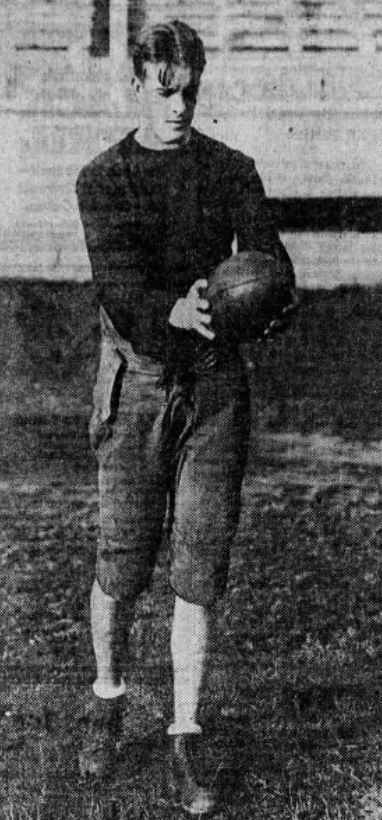
- Shiver in 1927

No. 26
- Position: End

Personal information
- Born: January 22, 1907; Sylvester, Georgia, U.S.
- Died: August 31, 1972 (aged 65); Savannah, Georgia, U.S.
- Listed height: 6 ft 1 in (1.85 m)
- Listed weight: 189 lb (86 kg)

Career information
- College: Georgia (1927)

Awards and highlights
- First-team All-American (1927); All-Southern (1927)

Ivey Shiver
- Outfielder
- Born: January 22, 1907; Sylvester, Georgia, U.S.
- Died: August 31, 1972 (aged 65); Savannah, Georgia, U.S.
- Batted: Right Threw: Right

MLB debut
- April 14, 1931, for the Detroit Tigers

Last MLB appearance
- May 13, 1934, for the Cincinnati Reds

MLB statistics
- Batting average: .191
- Home runs: 2
- Runs batted in: 6
- Stats at Baseball Reference

Teams
- Detroit Tigers (1931); Cincinnati Reds (1934)

Ivey Merwin Shiver (January 22, 1907 – August 31, 1972), nicknamed "Chick", was an American football and baseball player. He was an end for the Georgia Bulldogs football team in college, and later an outfielder in Major League Baseball. He played in the major leagues for the Detroit Tigers and Cincinnati Reds, and for several teams in the Minor Leagues. Shiver was captain of the Georgia "dream and wonder team" of 1927, selected All-Southern and All-American that same year. He was a renowned punter. He left baseball and the San Diego Padres after 1936 to coach football in Savannah. This left a spot for Ted Williams. He was the athletic director and head coach at Armstrong Junior College from 1937 to 1941, and won a state title at Savannah High School in 1942, where he coached from 1941 to 1952.
