= Fred Pickhard =

American football player (1906–1993)

No. 72
- Position: Tackle

Personal information
- Born: July 20, 1906; Mobile, Alabama, U.S.
- Died: April 11, 1993 (aged 86); Portland, Oregon, U.S.
- Listed height: 6 ft 2 in (1.88 m)
- Listed weight: 201 lb (91 kg)

Career information
- High school: Mobile
- College: Alabama (1924–1927)

Awards and highlights
- 2× National champion (1925, 1926); 2× Second-team All-American (1926, 1927); 2× All-Southern (1926, 1927); Rose Bowl MVP (1927)

Frederick William Pickhard Jr. (July 20, 1906 – April 11, 1993) was an American college football player.

== Early life ==
Fred Pickhard Jr. was born in Mobile, Alabama on July 20, 1906, to Frederick William Pickhard and Estella Guise. His mother came from Ohio.

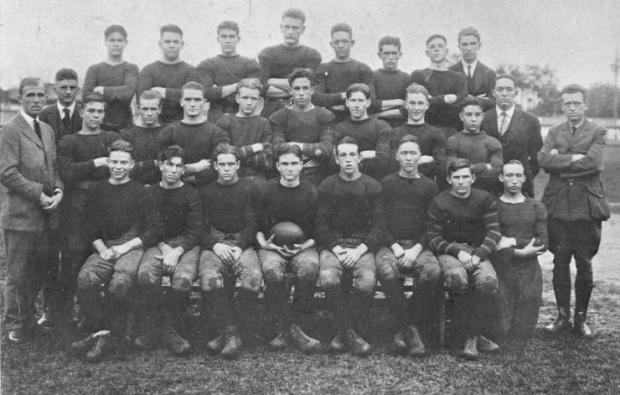
The 1922 Mobile High football team includes Pickhard.

== University of Alabama ==
Pickhard was a prominent tackle for Wallace Wade's Alabama Crimson Tide of the University of Alabama from 1924 to 1927. He was selected All-Southern and second-team All-America in 1926 and 1927.

=== 1926 ===
Pickhard blocked the punt against Sewanee in 1926, leading to the safety which secured the game and the undefeated season. Alabama also got two scores off blocks from Pickhard in the LSU game which followed. Just 16 punts were blocked all year for scores in college football, and Pickhard had three of them. He was selected Most Valuable Player of the 1927 Rose Bowl in which Alabama tied Stanford.

=== 1927 ===
He was captain of the 1927 team.

== Later life ==
After his football career, Pickhard moved to Oregon in 1938 and married Lucile Hoober. They had three children- Penny, Barbara, and Fred III- and eventually had nine grandchildren. He also coached football and eventually started a long-term career with the Goodyear Tire & Rubber Company in Portland, Oregon as a service manager. He died of heart failure in his Portland home on April 11, 1993. Pickhard is buried at the Portland Memorial Mausoleum.

== See also ==
- 1926 College Football All-America Team
- 1927 College Football All-America Team
