= Elvin Butcher =

American football and basketball player (1907–1957)

- Butcher c. 1926

No. 23
- Position: Center

Personal information
- Born: February 9, 1907; Knoxville, Tennessee, U.S.
- Died: June 6, 1957 (aged 50); Los Angeles, California, U.S.
- Listed weight: 184 lb (83 kg)

Career information
- College: Tennessee (1925–1928)

Awards and highlights
- SoCon championship (1927); Second-team All-American (1927); All-Southern (1927); 1920s All-Tennessee first team

Elvin Oscar Butcher (February 9, 1907 – June 6, 1957) was a college football and basketball player for the Tennessee Volunteers of the University of Tennessee.

== University of Tennessee ==
=== Football ===
Butcher was a prominent football player for Robert Neyland's Tennessee Volunteers from 1925 to 1928. Butcher was selected for a 1920s All-Tennessee football team.

==== 1927 ====
Butcher was selected All-Southern at the center position in 1927. His play against Vanderbilt helped secure the spot, as he outplayed Vandy center Vernon Sharpe, who arguably had the better season. One of the All-Southern teams was to face an all-star squad of Pacific Coast players, and as a result the basketball team took a significant hit from the loss of its captain Butcher.
