= Jimmy Armistead =

American football player (1905–1984)

Profile
- Position: Running back/Quarterback

Personal information
- Born: August 29, 1905; Nashville, Tennessee, U.S.
- Died: March 1984; Nashville, Tennessee, U.S.
- Listed height: 5 ft 10 in (1.78 m)
- Listed weight: 174 lb (79 kg)

Career information
- High school: Hume-Fogg
- College: Vanderbilt (1926–1928)

Awards and highlights
- All-Southern (1927, 1928)

James Cate Armistead (August 29, 1905 – March 1984) was an American college football player.

== Early life ==
James Cate Armistead was born on August 29, 1905, in Nashville, Tennessee, to Wirt Mayo Armistead and Sarah Adeline Cate.

=== High school ===
Armistead attended Hume-Fogg High School in Nashville, Tennessee. The first game played at Dudley Field was between the home-standing Commodores and the powerful Michigan Wolverines. A goal-line stand by the Commodores preserved a 0–0 tie. The following Friday, nearby Hume-Fogg High School played a game at Dudley. Senior Jimmie Armistead returned the opening kick for a touchdown, providing the first touchdown ever recorded in the stadium.

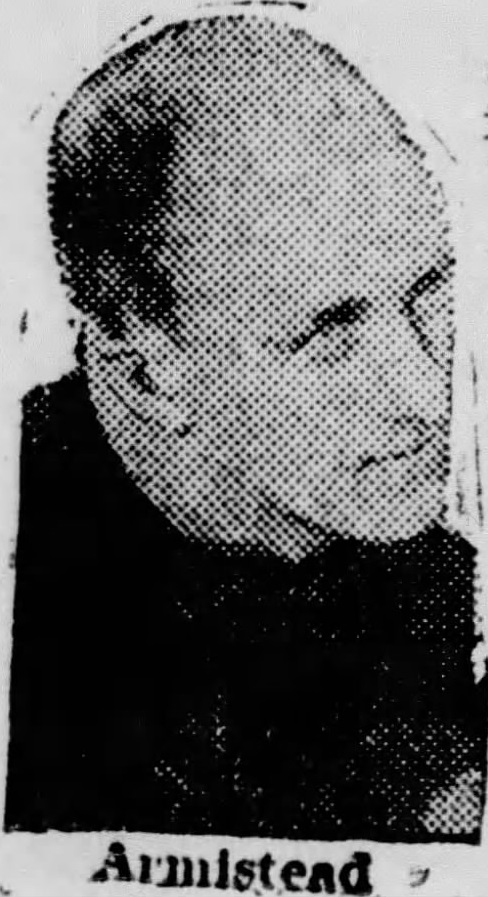
Armistead c. 1928

== Vanderbilt ==
Armistead was a prominent running back for the Vanderbilt Commodores of Vanderbilt University from 1926 to 1928. He was also bald, called by one writer "the bald eagle of Vanderbilt."

=== 1926 ===
He started slow; "Nature neglected to endow him with pugnacity; Or even aggressiveness. As a sophomore, he was so timid on attack that he was as easy to snuff out as a candle." He was always shy, and took no joy in seeing his opponent fail. In 1926, Vanderbilt lost its only game to national champion Alabama. Armistead once caught a pass in the game and was tackled just a few yards short of the goal without fighting for extra yardage. From there Vanderbilt failed to score; and so some Vanderbilt fans blamed Armistead for the loss.

=== 1927 ===
He took the criticism of 1926 to heart and emerged a new player in 1927. Armistead led the nation in scoring in 1927 with 138 points, a year in which he was a target of quarterback Bill Spears.

=== 1928 ===
When Spears graduated, Armistead was the triple-threat option, i.e. he now had to pass and kick, as well as captain. Armistead starred in the 14 to 7 victory over Kentucky. He made the second-team of the composite All-Southern eleven behind Florida quarterback Clyde Crabtree.

== See also ==
- List of NCAA major college football yearly scoring leaders
