= Gene Smith (American football guard) =

American football player (1905–1979)

Profile
- Position: Guard

Personal information
- Born: September 25, 1905; Montgomery, Alabama, U.S.
- Died: December 10, 1979 (aged 74); Atlanta, Georgia, U.S.
- Listed height: 5 ft 9 in (1.75 m)
- Listed weight: 190 lb (86 kg)

Career information
- College: Georgia

Career history
- Georgia (1927); Portsmouth (1930)

Awards and highlights
- All-Southern (1927); Third-team All-American (1927)
- Stats at Pro Football Reference

Henry Eugene "Jug Head" Smith (September 25, 1905 – December 10, 1979) was an American football guard in the National Football League (NFL). He played college football for the Georgia Bulldogs of the University of Georgia, where he was selected All-Southern. Smith was a member of its "dream and wonder team." He made an all-time Georgia Bulldogs football team picked in 1935. He played in the NFL as a member of the Portsmouth Spartans.
