= Ap Applewhite =

American football player (??–??)

Profile
- Positions: Tackle, End

Career information
- College: Mississippi (1925–1927)

Awards and highlights
- All-Southern (1927)

Austin "Ap" Applewhite was a college football player for University of Mississippi, captain of the 1927 team, and selected All-Southern. Applewhite played for coach Homer Hazel's teams as a tackle in 1925 and 1926, and an end in 1927. When Ole Miss won the Egg Bowl in 1927, Applewhite was presented the trophy and carried by students off the field. The 1927 team was nicknamed the "Mighty Mississippians".

Applewhite played with the Clarence Saunders Tigers.

Applewhite was also a boxer, notably once defeating Soldier Coleman in four rounds.
