= Sollie Cohen =

American football player (1907–1966)

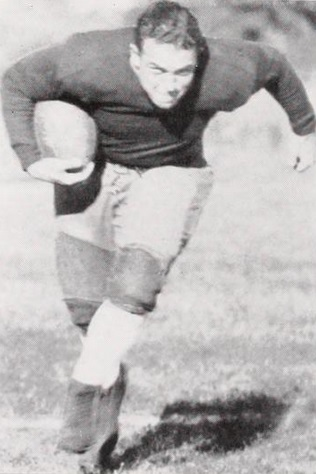
- Cohen, c. 1927

Profile
- Position: Fullback

Personal information
- Born: September 6, 1907; Delta City, Mississippi, US
- Died: April 1, 1966 (aged 58); Lake Providence, Louisiana, US
- Listed weight: 200 lb (91 kg)

Career information
- High school: Rolling Fork
- College: Ole Miss (1925–1927)

Awards and highlights
- All-Southern (1927); Norris Trophy; Ole Miss All-time team

Sollie Herman "Jew" Cohen (September 6, 1907 – April 1, 1966) was a college football player and later a businessman of Lake Providence, Louisiana.

== Early life ==
Cohen's parents were Jews from Russia. He was from Delta City, Mississippi and attended Rolling Fork High School.

== Ole Miss ==
Cohen was a prominent fullback on the Ole Miss Rebels football team. Cohen was named to the Mississippi All-Time Team by football historian Dr. L.H. Baker. He remained a prominent booster for the Ole Miss program long after his time at the school. He was "known as one of the greatest interference runners the South ever produced." He also excelled on defense.

=== 1927 ===
In 1927, he led Ole Miss to a 5–3–1 season and was selected All-Southern. Ole Miss won the first Egg Bowl with a trophy in 1927. Cohen scored the first touchdown for Ole Miss, capping a 51-yard scoring drive with a 1-yard plunge. He was chosen for the All-Southern team which played a game against Pacific Coast stars and won.

== Lake Providence ==
In the 1940s he lived in Lake Providence, Louisiana, where he owned a furniture and appliance store.
