= Bill Spears =

American football player (1906–1992)

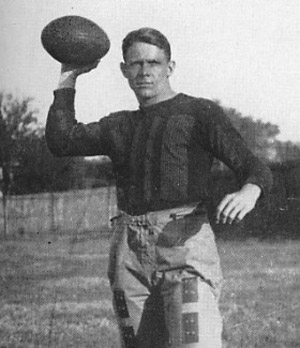
- circa 1927

Vanderbilt Commodores
- Position: Quarterback

Personal information
- Born: August 31, 1906; Jasper, Tennessee, U.S.
- Died: December 31, 1992 (aged 86); Tennessee, U.S.
- Listed weight: 155 lb (70 kg)

Career information
- College: Vanderbilt (1925–1927)

Awards and highlights
- First-team All-American (1927); Second-team All-American (1926); 2× All-Southern (1926, 1927); Ranked by coach Dan McGugin as one of his six best players
- College Football Hall of Fame (Class of 1962)

William Douglas Spears (August 31, 1906 – December 31, 1992), known as "Bounding Bill Spears", was an American football player and stand-out quarterback for Dan McGugin's Vanderbilt Commodores football teams from 1925 to 1927. Spears was elected to the College Football Hall of Fame in 1962. Grantland Rice said of Spears that he was one of the fastest quarters he had ever seen.

== Early life ==
=== High school ===
Spears attended The McCallie School.

== Vanderbilt ==
=== Playing years ===
Known as "Bounding Bill;" "Spears can run a team like a playing coach, drop kick, boot from placement, and pass cooly [sic] and accurately in the teeth of a charging line."

==== 1925 ====
Edwin Pope writes "In 1925 McGugin came up with his finest quarterback in Bill Spears. Spears learned much from his coach and in three seasons had an unbelievably low number of interceptions. He led the Commodores three years in which they only lost to Georgia Tech and Auburn in '25, Alabama in '26. and Texas in '27."

==== 1926 ====
The 1926 team suffered its only loss to national champion Alabama.

==== 1927 ====
One fellow wrote Vanderbilt produced "almost certainly the legit top Heisman candidate in Spears, if there had been a Heisman Trophy to award in 1927." In a 32–0 victory over Tulane, Spears had touchdown runs of 88 and 77 yards. Spears received the most votes for the 1927 All-Southern team, and was selected the first-team All-American quarterback by the Associated Press. The 1927 Vanderbilt Commodores included the nation's leading scorer in running back Jimmy Armistead. His understudy at quarterback was later coach Henry "Red" Sanders.

===== Statistics =====
| Year | Carries | Rushing Yards | Average | Rushing TDs | Completions | Attempts | Passing Yards | Passing TDs | Interceptions | Kickoff returns | Kickoff yards | Kickoff TDs | Punt returns | Punt return average | Punt returns TDs | XP |
|---|---|---|---|---|---|---|---|---|---|---|---|---|---|---|---|---|
| 1927 | 141 | 794 | 5.6 | 5 | 64 | 133 | 1207 | 9 | 4 | 5 | 177 | 1 | 30 | 5.9 | 7 | 16 |

=== Coaching years ===
==== 1929 ====
Spears was an assistant on the 1929 team.
