= Herdis McCrary =

American football player (1904–1981)

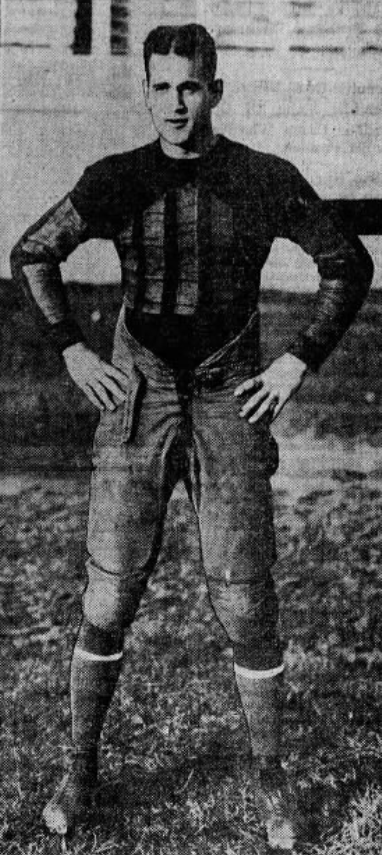
- McCrary in 1927

Profile
- Positions: Fullback, running back

Personal information
- Born: June 9, 1904; Bicknell, Indiana, U.S.
- Died: May 11, 1981 (aged 76); Green Bay, Wisconsin, U.S.
- Listed height: 6 ft 0 in (1.83 m)
- Listed weight: 207 lb (94 kg)

Career information
- High school: Bicknell
- College: Georgia

Career history
- Green Bay Packers (1929–1933)

Awards and highlights
- 3× NFL champion (1929, 1930, 1931); Second-team All-American (1927); All-Southern (1927)
- Stats at Pro Football Reference

Herdis William "Bull" McCrary (June 9, 1904 – May 11, 1981) was an American football player.

== Early life ==
Herdis W. McCrary was born on June 9, 1904, in Bicknell, Indiana, to Marshall McCrary.

== Football career ==
=== College career ===
He played at the fullback position for the University of Georgia Bulldogs football team. In 1927, he was a member of the "Dream and Wonder team" and was selected by the Associated Press and the United Press as a second-team player on their All-America teams. He made an all-time Georgia Bulldogs football team picked in 1935. He graduated from the University of Georgia with a law degree.

=== Professional career ===
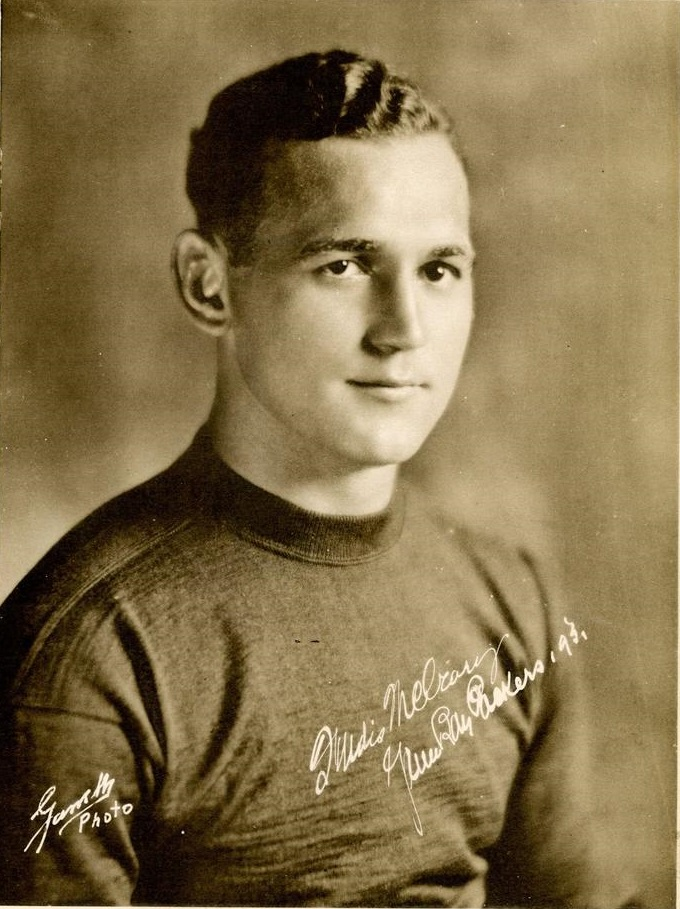

He played in the National Football League (NFL) for the Green Bay Packers as a fullback from 1929 to 1933.

== Other careers ==
McCrary operated McCrary Oil Sales and other businesses in Green Bay. He retired in 1965.

== Personal life ==
McCrary married Mary Bond Palmer on December 9, 1928. She died in 1977. They had one son and one daughter, Herdis Jr. and Mrs. Marianne Walworth. He later lived in St. Petersburg, Florida, before returning to Green Bay in his later years. He lived at 920 Mancel Lane in Green Bay.

McCrary died on May 11, 1981, at a hospital in Green Bay. He was buried in Fort Howard Cemetery.
