= Bobby Howes =

British actor (1895–1972)

- Born: Charles Robert William Howes; 4 August 1895; Chelsea, London, England
- Died: 27 April 1972 (aged 76); London, England
- Occupation: Actor
- Spouse: Patricia Malone (1922–1948)
- Children: 2

Charles Robert William Howes (4 August 1895 – 27 April 1972) was an English entertainer. He was a leading musical comedy performer in London's West End theatres in the 1930s and 1940s.

== Biography ==
Born in Chelsea and raised in Battersea, Surrey, his parents were Robert William Howes and Rose Marie Butler. After leaving school, he started an apprenticeship as an electrical engineer, but in 1909 after auditioning at the Battersea Palace for female-impersonator Sable Fern, he made his professional debut the same day playing a boy scout. He remained with Fern for over a year before joining The Six White Boys and then the Gotham Quartet. His career was interrupted for the First World War where he soldiered on the Western Front. He suffered a German mustard gas attack but recovered and resumed his career when he got a part (along with Tommy Handley) in the Seasoned To Taste revue at The Metropolitan Theatre. In 1923, he made his West End debut in The Little Revue at 9, followed by The Second Little Revue, both at The Little Theatre.

After a succession of parts in several plays, he gained a career break-through with the role-reversal comedy Mr. Cinders, based on the Cinderella pantomime, also featuring Binnie Hale, with whom he appeared on many occasions subsequently. He reprised his title role in Mr. Cinders in several different productions.

In the 1930s, he was with Van Phillips' Four Bright Sparks whose vocalists included Billy Milton. Four Bright Sparks recorded at least 60 sides. He was a leading musical comedy performer on the West End in the 1930s and 1940s, appearing in productions including For the Love of Mike, Tell Her the Truth, Yes Madam?, and Please Teacher. In 1945 he made his pantomime debut, playing Buttons in Cinderella at the Victoria Palace.

He married Patricia Malone in March 1922. Together they had two children - actress/singer Sally Ann Howes and musician Peter Howes, before divorcing in 1948. He performed with his daughter in 1953 in the musical Paint Your Wagon.

He continued onstage, including Broadway, and in films and television (notably in The Dickie Henderson Show) until he retired in the late 1960s. One of his most acclaimed roles was as the eponymous lead in Finian's Rainbow when it was revived on Broadway in 1960.

In April 1964, he was fined £10 after admitting a charge of indecent exposure.

He died on 27 April 1972, aged 76, in London, England.

== Filmography ==
- Elixir do Diabo, O (1964)
- Watch It, Sailor! (1961) – as a Drunk (guest appearance)
- The Good Companions (1957) – as Jimmy Nunn
- Happy Go Lovely (1951) – as Charlie
- Murder in the Footlights (1951)
- The Trojan Brothers (1946) – as Benny Castelli
- Bob's Your Uncle (1942)
- Men With Whips (1939)
- Yes, Madam? (1939) – as Bill Quinton
- Sweet Devil (1938) – as Tony Brent
- Please Teacher (1937) – as Tommy Deacon
- Over the Garden Wall (1934) – as Bunny
- 42nd Street singing 'Shuffle off to Buffalo' with Ruby Keeler
- For the Love of Mike (1932) – as Bobby Seymour
- Lord Babs (1932) – as Lord Basil 'Babs' Drayford
- Third Time Lucky (1931) – as Rev. Arthur Fear
- The Guns of Loos (1928) – as Danny
- On with the Dance (1927)

== Television ==
- Douglas Fairbanks Presents: "Point of View" – US airdate 14 May 1956 – episode 4.14[131] – Filmed at the British National Studios, Elstree, England
- Curtains For Harry (1955) – as Harry Bates – single episode show
- Out of This World (1950) – Proposed series that had only one episode, 15 November 1950, Wed 8.30 pm
- Such Is Life (1950) – played 'the little man struggling with his conscience' in this themed sketch series. 5 episodes, 30 mins each, 24 Apr-19 June 1950 – fortnightly Mon around 9 pm
- Paging You (1946) – episode No. 4

== Theatre ==
- Do Re Me (1961) – Prince of Wales Theatre, London – Opened 12 October 1961
- Finian's Rainbow (1961) – Blackpool Opera House, UK – March/April 1961
- Finian's Rainbow (1960) – Broadway – (revival performance) 23 May 1960 – 1 June 1960
- The Geese Are Getting Fat (1960) – Phoenix Theatre – 1960
- Finian's Rainbow (1958) – New Shakespeare Theatre, Liverpool – with Shani Wallis
- Hide and Seek (1958) – London Hippodrome – with Cicely Courtneidge
- The Entertainer (1958) – Leeds Grand Theatre & Opera House – July 1958
- Start From Scratch (1957) – Q Theatre, Kew (1956–1957 season) – with Glyn Dearman, Helen Christie; dir:Robert Henderson
- Harvey (1955) – Streatham Hill Theatre
- Paint Your Wagon (1953) – at Her Majesty's Theatre, The Haymarket – with daughter Sally Ann Howes – production ran for 18 months
- The Yellow Mask (1953) – His Majesty's Theatre
- Roundabout (1949) – three weeks, with Pat Kirkwood
- Four, Five, Six (1948) – with Binnie Hale
- The Man in the Street (1947) – St. James Theatre, October 1947
- Here Come The Boys (1946) – Saville Theatre, Shaftesbury Avenue – with Jack Hulbert
- Cinderella (1944) (pantomime) – Winter Garden
- By Jupiter (1944) – Palace Theatre, Manchester – show opened 25 July, closed quickly
- Let's Face It! (Jerry Walker) – (1942) (musical) – London Hippodrome – show opened 19 November – 348 performances
- Shepherd's Pie (1941) (musical) – Leeds Grand Theatre & Opera House – April 1941, with Arthur Riscoe, Richard Hearne, Vera Pearce and Raymond Newell
- Halfway To Heaven (1940s) – Shaftesbury Theatre – A New Play by Harry Segall. With Bobby Howes, Bryan Matheson, J H Roberts, Maxwell Foster
- Big Business (1940) – London Hippodrome
- All Clear (1939) – Queen's Theatre, London, with Beatrice Lillie – revue that opened on 20 December 1939
- Bobby Get Your Gun (1938) – Adelphi Theatre – Opened 7 October 1938
- Hide and Seek (1937) – London Hippodrome – show opened 14 October – with Cicely Courtneidge
- Please Teacher (1936) – London Hippodrome
- Christmas Mails 100 Years Ago (1935) – a comedic philatelic play by Nevile Stocken
- Yes Madam? (1934) – London Hippodrome – show opened 27 September – with Binnie Hale
- He Wanted Adventure (Bobby Bramstone) – Saville Theatre – 1933
- Tell Her The Truth (Bobbie) – Saville Theatre – show opened 14 June 1932, 234 performances
- For The Love of Mike (1931) – Saville Theatre
- The Song of the Drum (Chips) – Theatre Royal, Drury Lane – 1931
- Nippy (1930) – London Hippodrome – with Binnie Hale – 1930
- Sons O' Guns (1930) – London Hippodrome – show opened 26 June 1930.
- Mr. Cinders (1930) – Streatham Hill Theatre – April 1930
- Mr. Cinders (1929) – Adelphi Theatre, London – 528 performances
- Mr. Cinders (1928–1929) – London Hippodrome – with Binnie Hale, Ruth Maitland, Arthur Chesney
- The Blue Train (1927) – Prince of Wales Theatre – 10 May 1927
- The Midnight Follies (bathing chorus) (1925) – Metropole – with Enid Stamp-Taylor and Eddie Childs
- Little Revues (1923–24) – West End
- Seasoned To Taste (1919–1920) – a burlesque written by Jack Hylton as a vehicle for Tommy Handley and Howes, which opened at the end of 1919 and ran until early 1920, at the Metropolitan, Edgware Road.

== Other live performances ==
- Royal Variety Command Performance – 7 November 1955, Victoria Palace
- A gala revue at Theatre Royal, Drury Lane to promote National Savings – 17 October 1948.
- R.A.F.A. Festival of Reunion – Sunday 22 September 1946 – Royal Albert Hall

== Discography ==
- Finian's Rainbow (1960)
- Paint Your Wagon (1953)
- She's My Lovely (1940s?)
- Yes, Madam (1934) – with Binnie Hale
- "I'm a One-man Girl" – with Binnie Hale, 78 from Mr. Cinders
- The Blue Train (1927)
- Rudolf Friml in London (1923–30) – Derek Oldham, Edith Day, Ethel Levey, Bobby Howes, Roy Royston, Dennis Kings, et al., from 78s.

== Product endorsements ==
- Ardath Cigarette Cards, No. 28 of 50. Issued by Ardath Tobacco Co. in England.
- British Film Stars cigarette cards issued in England by W.A. & A.C. Churchman in 1934. He was card No. 14.
