= For the Love of Mike =

For the Love of Mike may refer to:

- For the Love of Mike (1927 film), an American silent romantic drama film
- For the Love of Mike (1932 film), a British musical comedy film based on the play
- None but the Brave (1960 film), also known as For the Love of Mike, an American Western film
- For the Love of Mike (novel), a 2003 novel by Rhys Bowen
- For the Love of Mike (play), a 1931 play with music by H. F. Maltby and Clifford Grey
