= Philip Strange =

British actor (1884–1963)

- Publicity still c. 1930
- Born: 4 June 1884; Remenham, England
- Died: 5 January 1963 (aged 78); Marlow, Buckinghamshire
- Occupations: Singer and Actor
- Years active: 1906-1950
- Spouses: Pauline Clare Bamberger (m. 1910; div. 1922) Madeline Theodorothy Seymour (m. 1928) Annie Louise Doble (m. 1959)
- Children: Ronald Stanley Anker Simmons
- Relatives: 1st Marquess of Reading (uncle-in-law); Trilby Clark (daughter-in-law)

Philip Golding Simmons MC (4 June 1884 - 5 January 1963), known professionally as Philip Strange, was an English singer and stage and film actor. In a career of over 40 years, he appeared as a tenor in concerts and musical plays and then turned to straight plays and films. He was mostly cast in supporting roles, playing princes and villains, aristocrats and soldiers. His greatest success as an actor came late in his career when he played the father in The Winslow Boy during a ten-month tour in 1947-1948.

== Early life ==
Philip Golding Simmons was born at Bird Place in Remenham, Henley-on-Thames, Berkshire, England, the only son of Sir William Anker Simmons K.B.E. (1857-1927), an auctioneer and estate agent, agricultural adviser and four times mayor of Henley-on-Thames, and Lady Simmons, née Edith Nora Beddome (d. 1932). He had three sisters: Irene Nora (b. 1887), Marjorie Yvonne (b. 1890) and Lorna Yvette (b. 1897). Strange was educated at Marlborough College from September 1897 and was awarded the prize for trebles in the following year. He went on to study singing under Arthur Thompson (d. 1926) at the Royal Academy of Music, where he won the Ross Scholarship and in 1904 a bronze medal for singing. He then went to Paris to pursue further vocal training with Jacques Bouhy for a year.

== Career ==
=== Concerts ===
Strange sang for the first time in public at the Terminal Chamber Concert of the students of the Royal Academy of Music at the Queen’s Hall in London on 21 July 1904. He began his professional career two years later after his return from France and made his debut at a concert with Clara Butt in Dundee on 16 October 1906. Strange toured with Clara Butt and Kennerley Rumford until 1912, and the pair became friends of the Simmons family (see below). From 1907 to 1912, Strange appeared regularly at the Chappell Ballad Concerts at the Queen’s Hall in London. He also performed solo and sang at the Aeolian Hall and at the Promenade Concerts in 1908 and gave a vocal recital at Bechstein Hall in 1910. In the same year he became the first singer to perform the song „Where My Caravan has Rested“, accompanied by Hermann Löhr, who had completed the composition on the same day. Strange had by now become a popular and sought after tenor. He accompanied the ten-year-old pianist Solomon at his debut at the Royal Albert Hall in 1912, performed with Vera Doria at the Aeolian Hall and was a member of the Marie Novello Trio in 1919. In 1926 he appeared with José Collins in Washington. His last performance as a singer seems to have been in April 1939 as one of the soloists of John Stainer’s The Crucifixion at St. Paul’s Parish Church, Thornton Heath.

=== Theatre ===
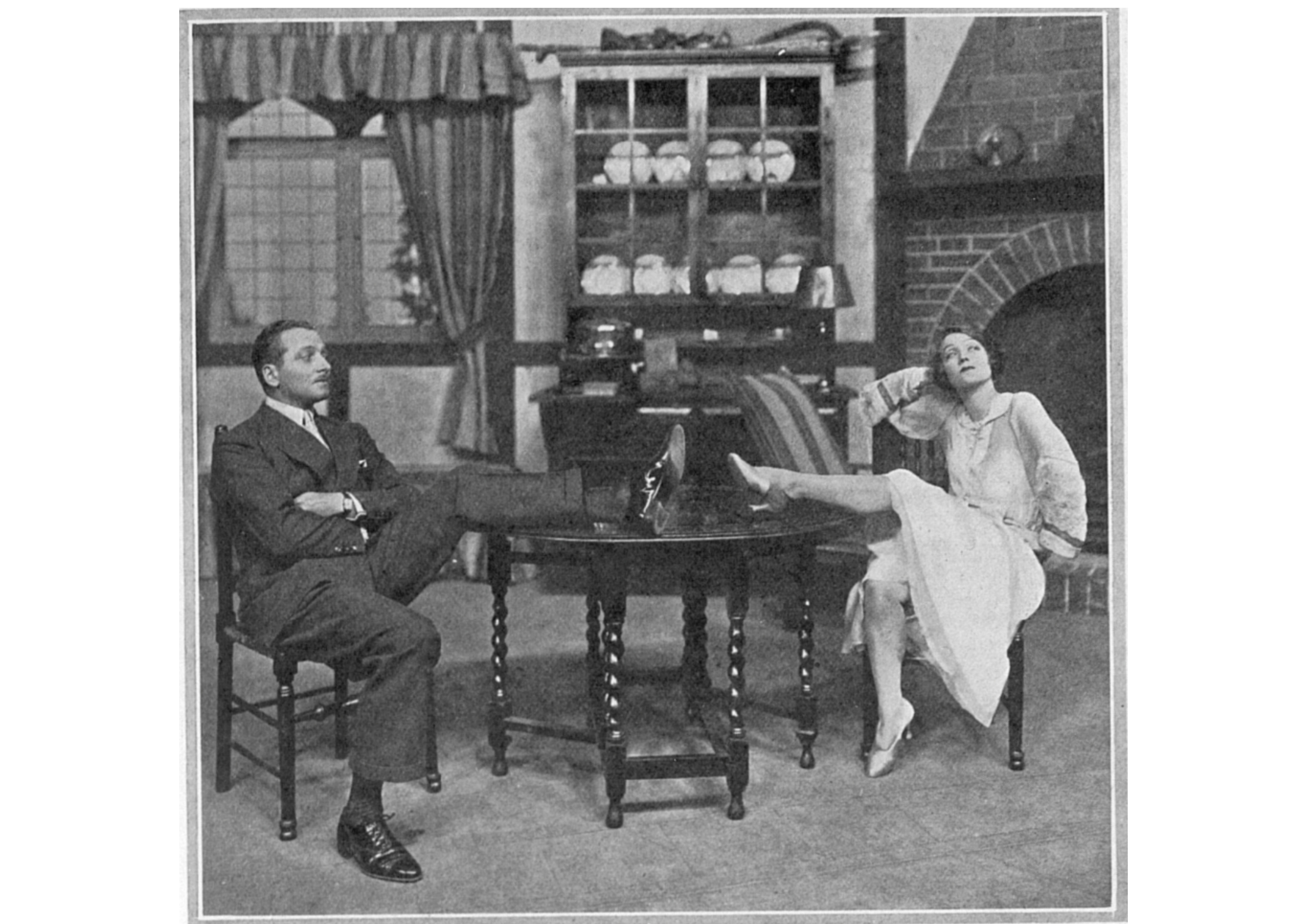
Philip Simmons and Dorothy Dickson in "Patricia", 1924.

Besides singing, Strange also acted on the stage throughout most of his career. Two years after he made his debut as a tenor, George Edwardes gave him a contract to appear in his shows at the Gaiety Theatre and elsewhere. His first role in 1908 was Sir Anthony Phipps in the musical play The Dollar Princess in Manchester and Edinburgh, before it opened in London. He next played Apollo in Tariff Reform, or the Gift of the Gods in Henley and appeared in the tour production of The Merry Widow. After two years of concerts, Strange returned to plays in 1912 and performed in The Dancing Viennese by Oscar Straus at the Coliseum in London. In the fall he went to America where he appeared as Prince Ivan in The Enchantress in Ohio, as Gaston in Little Boy Blue at the Chicago Opera House and as Prince Louis, the leading male role, in The Dream Maiden, a comic opera by Allen Lowe and Bela Laszky, in New York and on tour. After the war, Strange performed in the musical play Maggie by Fred Thompson and the next year in Who’s Hooper? and The Naughty Princess. In 1922, he appeared in Bruce Bairnsfather’s two-act play Old Bill, M.P. Now under contract with George Grossmith and J. A. E. Malone, Strange was the leading man in the touring production of the musical comedy Sally. In the next year he appeared as Hector in the popular musical play Toni and then in the successful musical comedy The Beauty Prize, followed by the equally popular comedy Patricia, in which he played the hero.

This string of successes was cut short in 1925. Edward Laurillard had offered Strange the leading part in the American performance of A Night Out. The play, which had been a success in London, proved to be a flop in Philadelphia and was canceled after 16 performances. Strange accepted a settlement, went to New York and looked for work on Broadway. Nothing came his way for six months. Then he met William Le Baron who offered him a bit part in a film. He went to Hollywood, where he acted in three plays. Under his new name of Philip Strange, he played the male lead in The Silver Cord with the Los Angeles Repertory Theatre at the Figueroa Playhouse in 1928. Two years later he appeared in two one-act plays at The Writers’ Club, first in Acid Drops by Gertrude E. Jennings and then in The Prince Sits Out The Dance by Marie E. Rodda.

=== Films ===
Philip Strange made 38 films, 15 of them in New York and Hollywood, where he spent four years. Today, many of his films are lost, while 12 are accessible online.

In 1921-1922, he appeared in three films produced by Stoll Picture Productions in Cricklewood: The Eleventh Hour, which was commenced in August 1921 and partly filmed at Henley, Half a Truth, which was completed in November, and The Truants, a Foreign Legion film in which he played the hero. The last two films are lost.

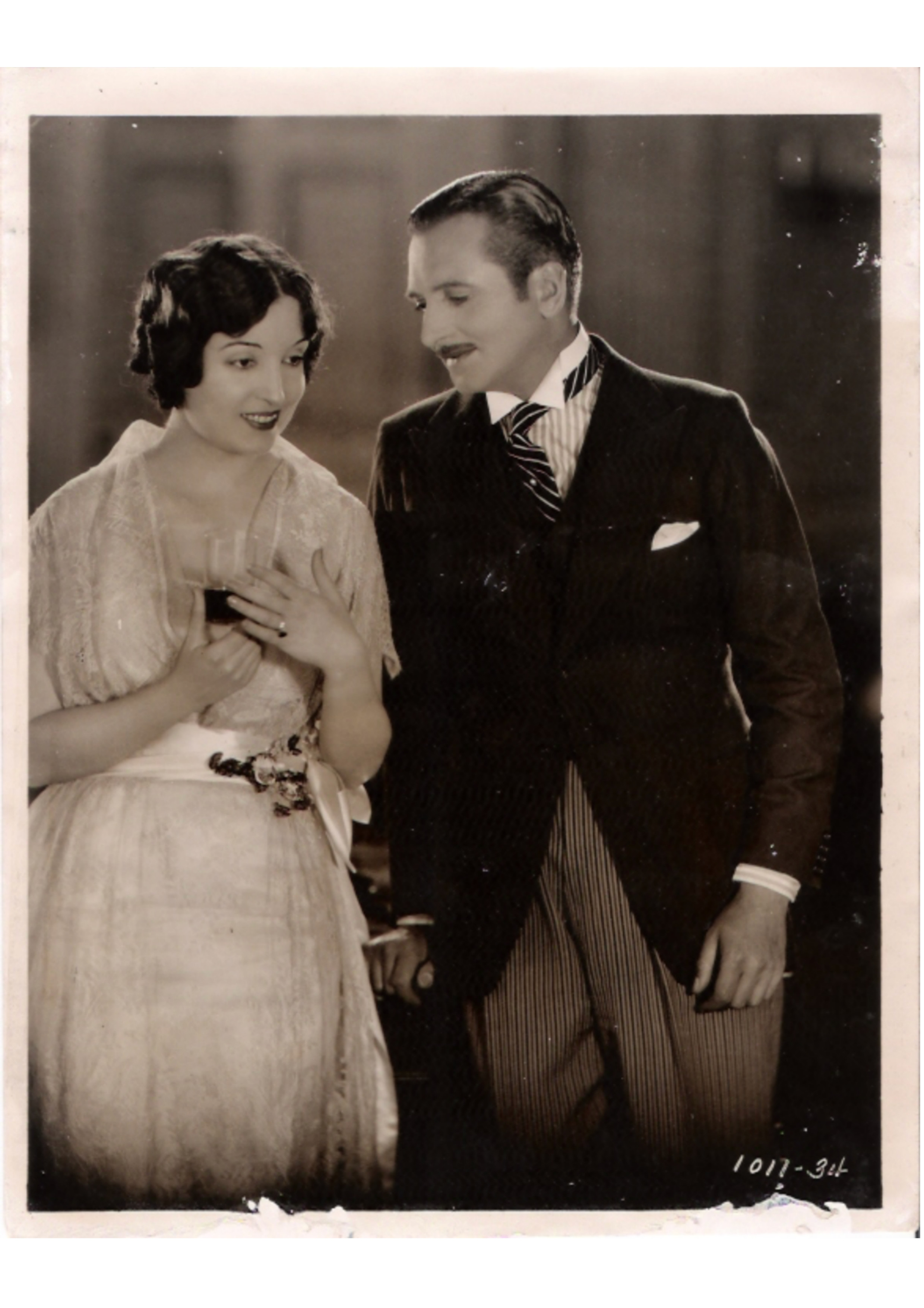
Alice Joyce and Philip Strange in The Ace of Cads, 1926.

While looking for work on Broadway in 1926, Strange met William Le Baron who encouraged him to take a screen test at the Astoria Studios on Long Island. The test went well, and Strange was offered a bit part in The Sorrows of Satan, where he can be spotted sitting at a table at min. 36:46. On the film set, he was noticed by Adolphe Menjou because of his fine suit by Anderson & Sheppard. Menjou asked him if he wanted to play in his next film, The Ace of Cads. Strange got the second lead and played the villain, conveying „a nice note of ruthless selfishness.“ It was his first important role. Before the film was released, the actor’s name was changed, first to Sterling, and then to Strange. He was now offered a long-term contract with Paramount Famous Players-Lasky. In the New York studios, Strange made The Popular Sin and Broadway Nights, both of which are lost. When the Astoria Studio was shut down on 15 March 1927, all staff, including the contract players, were sent to Hollywood.

After Man Power, which is lost, Strange made Nevada with Gary Cooper and Thelma Todd. He played Ben Ide, an English rancher, whose sister Hettie quickly becomes Cooper’s love interest. Cooper catches the rustlers who stole Ben Ide’s cattle, and then he gets Hettie. Philip Strange gave an amusing account of the filming of Nevada. His next two movies were Sporting Goods with Richard Dix, which was produced in November and December 1927 as „The Traveling Salesman“, and the successful Loves of an Actress with Pola Negri. Dissatisfied with his roles, Strange concluded his Paramount contract after only half a year in December 1927 and decided to become freelance. On the 20th of October his father had died. Together with Ronald Colman, Strange left for England on the Berengaria on the 10th of February 1928. Clive Brook had given him an introduction to Alfred Hitchcock, who was filming some scenes for Champagne on the Berengaria after her arrival at Southampton a week later, but nothing came of it. Instead, Strange found a new wife and returned to America with Madeline Seymour in April.

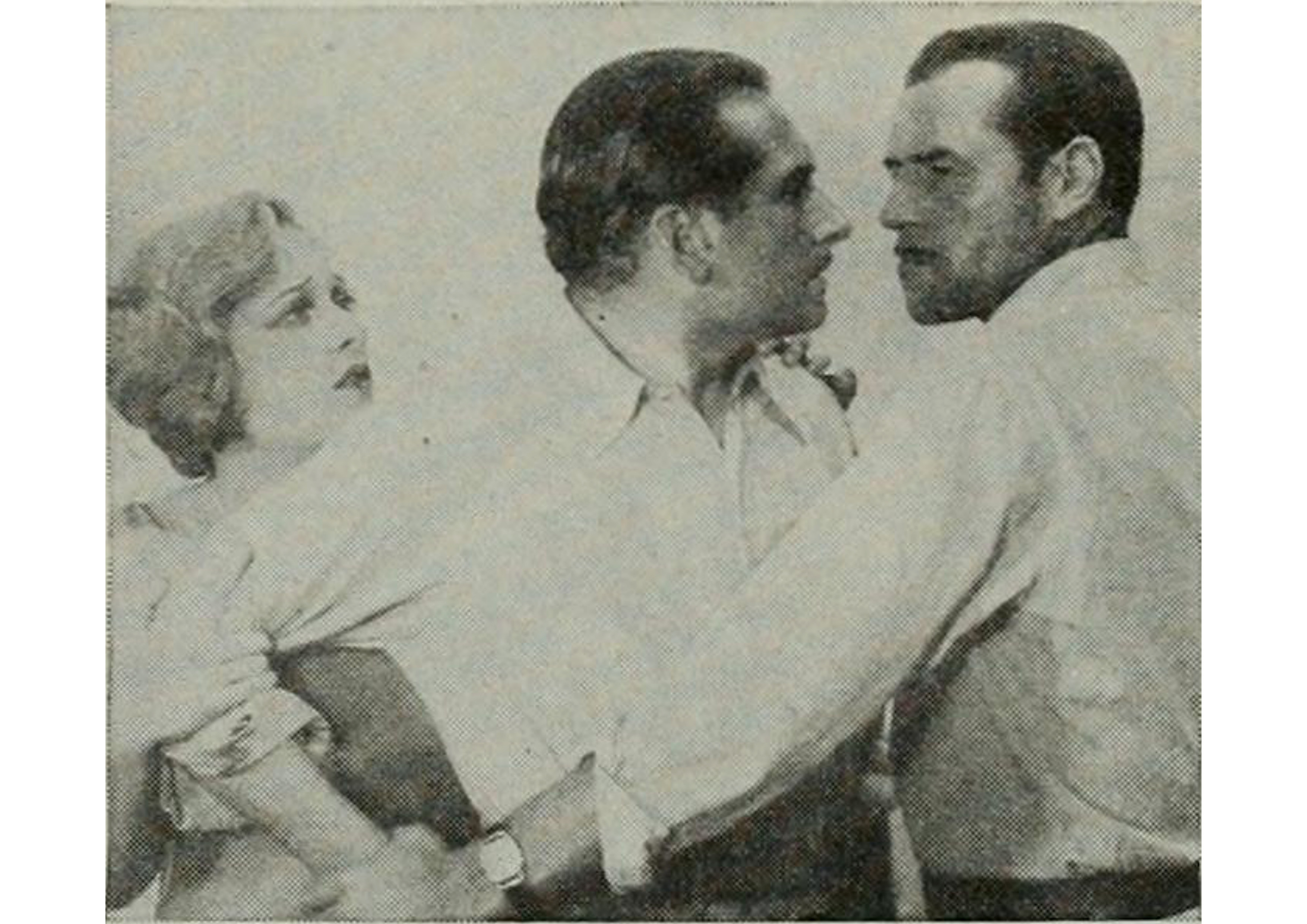
Dorothy Revier, Philip Strange and Jack Holt in Vengeance, 1930.

His next film, The Rescue with Ronald Colman, one of Strange’s best films, survives incomplete. He then played the villain in Behind that Curtain, his first talkie and the earliest surviving Charlie Chan film. In The Unholy Night, supporting Roland Young and Ernest Torrence, Strange can be heard singing together with the others. He has a strong scene in which he breaks down, knowing there is a murderer in the house. His last film of 1929, Wall Street, appears to have survived. In Vengeance, he played the second lead to Jack Holt and gave one of his most striking performances as the drunkard Charles Summers. In his small part in A Notorious Affair, he displayed his comic abilities as the monocled fiancé of Billie Dove, who marries the suave Basil Rathbone instead. His role in Bright Lights, again as the rich fiancé, was not much more than a bit part. It was the last film he made in America.

Back in England, where he had kept his house, Strange was unable to continue his success and played mostly minor roles, many of them in quota quickies. The first reviews were damning. When he played Richard Amory in the adaptation of Agatha Christie’s play Black Coffee in 1931, the critic from the Bioscope wrote that Strange was „clearly neglected by the director“, while William H. Mooring states that Strange „behaves with incredible „amateurishness““. Nevertheless, for 1932 there are five films to his credit: Strictly Business, Money for Nothing, The Return of Raffles, Sally Bishop and Diamond Cut Diamond with Adolphe Menjou. In 1933, he had a fine role in Loyalties, the film version of John Galsworthy’s play about antisemitism. Strange played the staunch friend of Captain Dancy (Miles Mander), who had robbed the Jew de Levis (noble and indignant: Basil Rathbone). Most of the next five films are lost: Mayfair Girl, Designing Women, Guest of Honour, Borrowed Clothes and No Escape, in which Strange played with his wife Madeline Seymour. The Scarlet Pimpernel, with Leslie Howard and Merle Oberon, is the best film in which Strange appeared. He had a few lines as member of the league of the Scarlet Pimpernel and can be seen without moustache, but with a spotted cravat, in the Blacks Club and at the ball. Romance in Rhythm and Boomerang, his next films, are lost. In 1935, Conquest of the Air, an ambitious film chronicling the history of aviation was begun, supervised by Winston Churchill and starring Laurence Olivier as Vincenzo Lunardi. Philip Strange had a small bit part and appears at min. 52:47 as co-pilot with headphones, almost unrecognizable without his moustache. In the next year, he played Geoffrey in Jury's Evidence. In 1937 he had a small but crucial part as Richard Challoner in The High Command, where he is shot after six minutes. He then played Mr. Henry in The Sky's the Limit, a musical comedy. His next and last film was made twelve years later in 1949. Here, in Trottie True, he can be seen at min. 1:23:41 in a bit part. He has exactly one line: „She’s a very pretty girl.“ In the following year, Strange appeared in his only TV programme, Drawing-Room Detective, which was aired on May 27, 1950. While it is not known which role he played, the film is notable for being one of the earliest TV appearances of Roger Moore.

== Military Service ==
Philip Strange served in World War I with the Grenadier Guards in France and Belgium. He had initially been with the 2/5th Battalion of the Suffolk Regiment (Territorial Force) and received his training at Killinghall Camp, a huge tent camp near Harrogate in Yorkshire. In November 1916, he was transferred to the Grenadier Guards at Chelsea Barracks, London, and was appointed to the Special Reserve of Officers as Lieutenant. Four months later, he joined the 1st Battalion in France and took part in the attack at Boesinghe in Belgium on 31 July 1917, which was part of the Battle of Passchendaele. In December, Strange was awarded the Military Cross „For conspicuous gallantry and devotion to duty when in charge of the leading wave in an advance. On seeing two enemy machine guns trying to get into action he brought his Lewis guns to bear, and, getting away to a flank, dashed in with two sections with rifle-bayonet and bomb before they could open fire. Some of the enemy retired at once and all the remainder were put out of action. It was due to his gallantry and skill that the advance was not checked. Both machine guns were captured.“ The battalion then moved to Steenbeek Valley, where it helped with the preparations for the attack on 9 October 1917, and in January went to France. An anecdote recounts that „One night in the trenches Mr. Simmons was singing one of the men’s favourite songs, „Picardy,“ to them. Next night they could hear the Boches in the trenches opposite practising the same air to German words!“ On 19 February 1919, Philip Strange was demobilised and granted the rank of Captain. When he returned home to his wife, she found him „greatly changed“.

In the second World War, Strange was at the Small Arms School at Bisley.

== Private Life ==
Philip Strange was married three times. His first wife was Pauline Clare Bamberger (1886-1927), a niece of Sir Rufus Isaacs, who was later to become the 1st Marquess of Reading. They were married on 14. July 1910 at Christ Church, (now Spire House) Lancaster Gate, London. Among the 300 guests were Clara Butt and Kennerley Rumford. The couple lived at Bird Place Cottage, Henley-on-Thames, a Grade II listed building next to the Henley Royal Regatta Headquarters. Some years after the war they moved to Harley Road in Hampstead, London. When Strange met his second wife, he left Pauline in March 1921 without giving a reason. When she wrote to him to ask if he was prepared to live with her again, he replied: „Dear Wynne, I hate having to say anything to hurt you, but it is quite impossible for me to return to you. There can never be any happiness for us together, and I don’t want to waste any more years of your life. I take all the blame on myself, and only ask one thing of you - try and forgive me for the misery I have caused you. And I pray that some day you may know what real happiness means. I could never give it you; that is why my decision is final. God bless you, Wynne dear. - Yours, Philip.“ His wife petitioned for restitution of conjugal rights in 1921, which was granted on April 25, 1922, and for divorce in the same year.

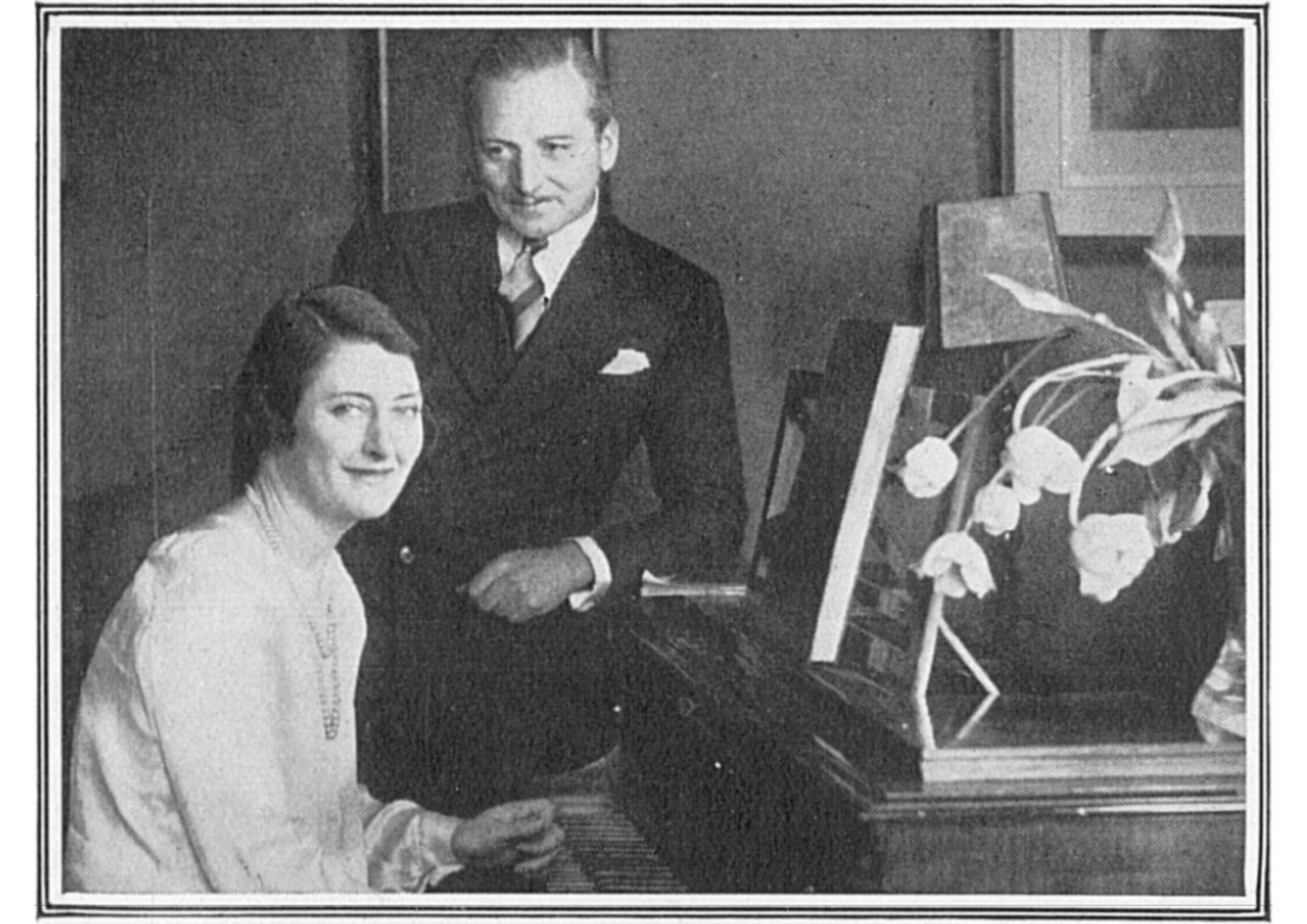
Madeline Seymour and Philip Strange, 1928.

His second wife was the actress Madeline Theodorothy Seymour (1891-1873), the daughter of the painter and illustrator George Langford Seymour (active 1876-1916). They had met in 1920 when they were both playing in Who’s Hooper at the Adelphi Theatre in London. Seymour had just been divorced from Major Alan Gerald Reid Kellett, an adventurer who had beaten her with his belt. Strange, who was still married, and Seymour became secretly engaged, but the engagement was broken two years later. In 1928, when Strange returned to England for two months, they met again at the Adelphi and renewed the engagement. They were married a few days later on 30 March 1928 at the Prince’s Row Register Office off Buckingham Palace Road. When the couple returned from Hollywood, they lived at Cherry Tree Cottage in Nettlebed, Henley-on-Thames. Later, they moved to Maple Cottage, Maple Walk, in Cooden.

Madeleine Seymour, Philip Strange, Jessica and Richard Barthelmess on board the yacht Pegasus.

It is not known when Strange and Seymour separated. In June 1959, Strange married Annie Louise Doble (1896-1978), née Crawford, at Paddington. They remained together until his death.

Philip Strange had a son from his first marriage, Ronald Stanley Anker Simmons, who was born on May 15, 1911, at Bird Place Cottage in Henley. After attending Radley College, he was a stockbroker in London and after the war became the director of Laminated Accessories Ltd. and the managing director of Hordern-Richmond, Ltd, Haddenham. In the 1950s, Anker Simmons emigrated to the United States and settled in Massachusetts, where he became the president of Hy-Du-Lignum Co. Inc. and of Economy Tooling Products, Inc., Malden, Mass. He married the actress Trilby Clark on June 1, 1932, and spent the honeymoon at Rocquebrun in the villa of his godmother, Dame Clara Butt. Clark petitioned for restitution of conjugal rights in 1933. In America, Anker Simmons married Fannie S. „Bay“ Echols (1909-2001). He died in 1982.

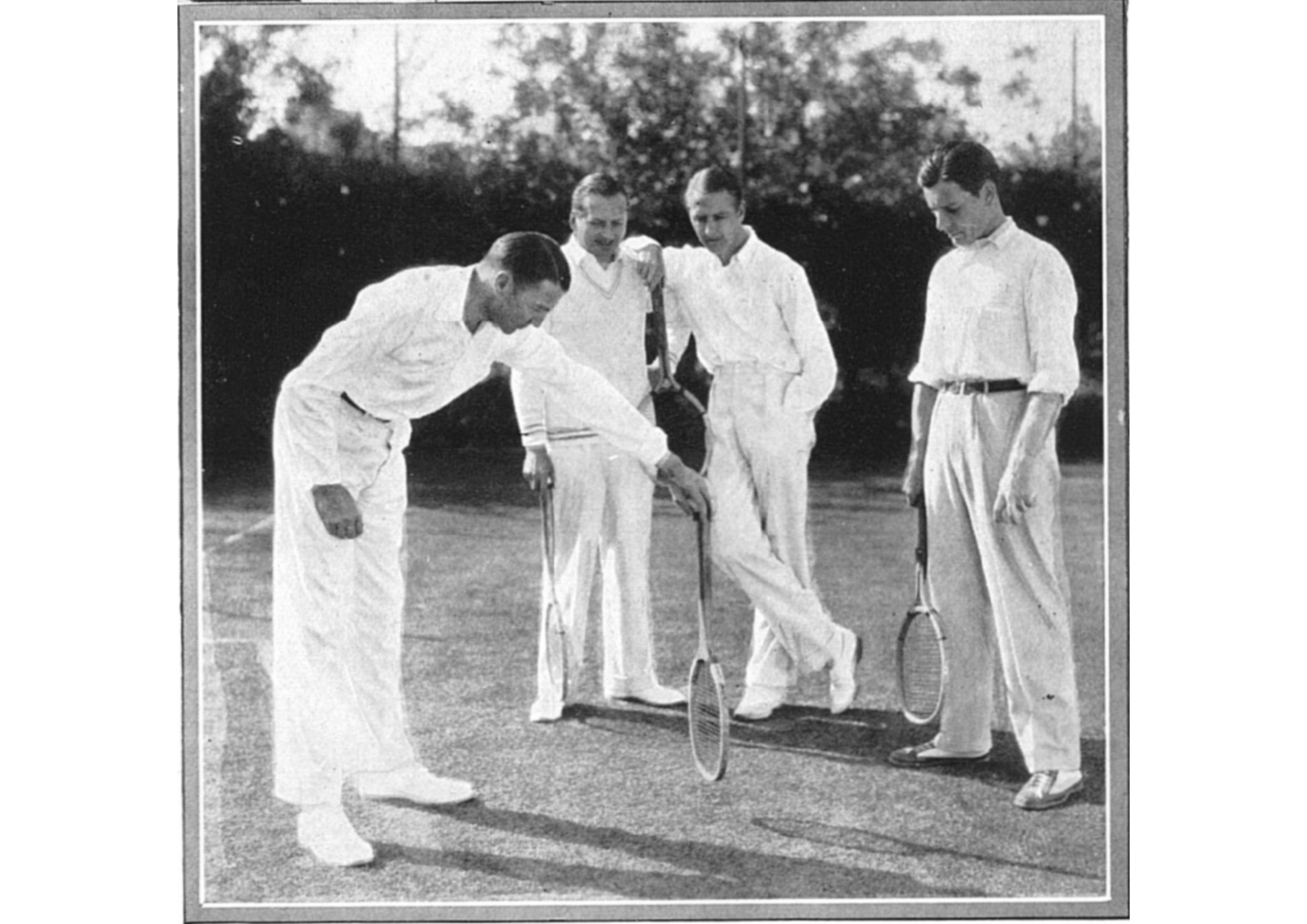
Clive Brook, Philip Strange, Percy Marmont and Ronald Colman on the tennis court of Clive Brook, 1927.

Strange was a keen sportsman who took part in the Henley Regatta and played tennis and golf. He was a member of the Stage Golfing Society, where he played for the Adelphi with his future wife Madeline Seymour in 1920 and with George Grossmith in 1922. From 1937-1940, Strange was secretary of the Cooden Beach Golf Club. In Hollywood, Strange participated in the tennis parties which took place every Sunday morning on the courts of Clive Brook, Ronald Colman and others.

Philip Golding Simmons died on 5 January 1963 in Marlow, Buckinghamshire. He is buried in the churchyard of St. Peter and Paul in Shiplake, Oxfordshire, in front of the grave of his last wife and her first husband, Francis Joseph Pinder Rose (1892-1948).

== Theatre Performances ==
Season	Play Title	Theatre	Role	Notes
1908	The Dollar Princess	Prince's Theatre, Manchester, and provincial tour	Sir Anthony Phipps, Valet to Conder	
1909	The Merry Widow	tour	M. Khadja (Counsellor of Legation)	steps in for W. Tailleur Andrews as Vicomte De Jolidon in November in Newcastle
1909	Tariff Reform, or the Gift of the Gods	Fawley Court, Henley-on-Thames	Apollo	
1912	The Dancing Viennese	Coliseum, London	Graf Andre Clairville	
1912	The Enchantress	Grand Opera House, Cincinnati, Ohio	Prince Ivan of Zergovia	
1913	Little Boy Blue	Chicago Opera House	Gaston, the Marquis de La Tour	
1913	The Dream Maiden	The Empire Theatre, Syracuse, New York	Louis, the Prince of Hendonia	leading man
1919	Maggie	Oxford Theatre, London	Jack Petherick	
1920	„Who’s Hooper?“	Adelphi Theatre, London	Mr. Hooper	succeeded Robert Michaelis
1920	The Naughty Princess	Adelphi Theatre, London	Hippolyte Flammèche	
1922	Old Bill, M.P	Lyceum Theatre, London	Lieut. Cheerio, M. C.	
1922	Sally	provincial tour	Blair Farquar	leading man
1923	Toni	provincial tour	Hector	
1924	The Beauty Prize	Winter Garden Theatre, London; provincial tour	John Brooke	
1924	Patricia	His Majesty’s Theatre, London	John Bradshaw (inventor)	leading juvenile
1925	A Night Out	Garrick Theatre, Philadelphia	Paillard	
1928	The Silver Cord	The Figueroa Playhouse, Los Angeles	David Phelps	The Los Angeles Repertory Theatre opening Nov 19th
1930	Acid Drops	The Writers’ Club	a parson	
1930	The Prince Sits Out the Dance	The Writers Club		
1933	Doctor’s Orders	Globe Theatre, London	Pope	
1936	Uneasily To Bed	provincial tour	Dion Atherton	
1937	No Sleep For The Wicked	Garrick Theatre, Southport	Bob Palmer	
1940 ca.	Journey’s End	Small Arms School, Bisley	Osborne	
1945	Interference	Globe Theatre, London		produced by Lionel Marson and Strange with the company from the Small Arms School
1947	Angel	Strand Theatre, London	Father Lucas	
1947	The Winslow Boy	provincial tour	Arthur Winslow	
1948	An English Summer	The Lyric Theatre, Hammersmith	Sir Arthur Feathersdye, G.C.V.O.	
1949	Breach of Marriage	provincial tour	George Mannering KC	

== Filmography ==
Year	Title	Role	Director	Co-stars	Studio	Notes
1922	The Eleventh Hour	Hugh Cheryl	George Ridgwell	Madge White, Dennis Wyndham	Stoll	a print is preserved in the British Film Institute (BFI) collection
1922	Half a Truth	Barry Connell	Sinclair Hill	Margaret Hope, Irene Rooke	Stoll	lost
1922	The Truants	Tony Stretton	Sinclair Hill	Joan Morgan	Stoll	lost
1926	The Sorrows of Satan	man in hotel restaurant	D. W. Griffith	Adolphe Menjou, Ricardo Cortez	Paramount	bit part; extant
1926	The Ace of Cads	Basil de Gramercy	Luther Reed	Adolphe Menjou	Paramount	lost
1926	The Popular Sin	George Montfort	Malcolm St. Clair	Florence Vidor, Clive Brook	Paramount	lost
1927	Broadway Nights	Bronson	Joseph C. Boyle	Lois Wilson, Barbara Stanwyck	Robert Kane Productions	lost
1927	Man Power	Randall Lewis	Clarence G. Badger	Richard Dix, Mary Brian	Paramount	lost
1927	Nevada	Ben Ide	John Waters	Cary Cooper, Thelma Todd, William Powell	Paramount	extant
1928	Sporting Goods	Henry Thorpe	Malcolm St. Clair	Richard Dix	Paramount	lost
1928	Loves of an Actress	Count Vareski	Rowland V. Lee	Pola Negri	Paramount	lost
1929	The Rescue	D’Alacer	Herbert Brenon	Ronald Colman, Lily Damita	Samuel Goldwyn	incomplete print in the George Eastman House
1929	Behind that Curtain	Eric Durand	Irving Cummings	Warner Baxter, Lois Moran	Fox Studios	extant
1929	The Unholy Night	Lieut. Williams	Lionel Barrymore	Roland Young, Ernest Torrence	Metro-Goldwyn-Mayer	extant
1929	Wall Street	Walter Tabor	Roy William Neill	Ralph Ince	Columbia Pictures	
1930	Vengeance	Charles Summers	Archie Mayo	Jack Holt, Dorothy Revier	Columbia	extant
1930	A Notorious Affair	Lord Percival Northmore	Lloyd Bacon	Billie Dove, Basil Rathbone, Kay Francis	First National Pictures	extant
1930	Bright Lights	Emerson Fairchild	Michael Curtiz	Dorothy Mackaill	First National Pictures	extant
1931	Black Coffee	Richard Amory	Leslie S. Hiscott	Austin Trevor, Adrianne Allen	Twickenham Film Studios	lost
1931	Strictly Business	Bartling	Mary Field	Betty Amann	Welwyn Studios	a print is preserved in the British Film Institute (BFI) collection
1932	Money for Nothing	Jackson	Monty Banks	Seymour Hicks, Edmund Gwenn	British International Pictures	
1932	The Return of Raffles		Mansfield Markham	George Barraud, Camilla Horn	Walton Studios	uncredited; a print is preserved in the British Film Institute (BFI) collection
1932	Diamond Cut Diamond	Portiere	Fred Niblo, Maurice Elvey	Adolphe Menjou, Benita Hume	Elstree Studios	
1932	Sally Bishop	Tom Durlacher	T. Hayes Hunter	Joan Barry, Harold Huth	Beaconsfield Studios	
1933	Loyalties	Major Colford	Basil Dean	Basil Rathbone, Heather Thatcher	Associated Talking Pictures	extant
1933	Mayfair Girl		George King	Sally Blane, John Stuart	Warner Bros., Teddington Studios	
1934	Designing Women	Levine	Ivar Campbell	Valerie Taylor, Stewart Rome	Shepperton Studios	a print is preserved in the British Film Institute (BFI) collection
1934	Guest of Honour		George King	Henry Kendall, Miki Hood	Warner Bros., Teddington Studios	uncredited
1934	Borrowed Clothes	Clarence Ponsonby	Arthur Maude	Anne Grey, Lester Matthews	Columbia Pictures	
1934	No Escape	Kirk Fengler	Ralph Ince	Ian Hunter, Binnie Barnes	Teddington Studios	
1934	The Scarlet Pimpernel	Member of the League of the Scarlet Pimpernel	Harold Young	Leslie Howard, Merle Oberon	Elstree Studios	extant
1934	Romance in Rhythm	Peter Lloyd	Lawrence Huntington	Phyllis Clare, David Hutcheson	Cricklewood Studios	
1934	Boomerang	Jack Muir	Arthur Maude	Nora Swinburne, Lester Matthews	Nettlefold Studios	
1935	Conquest of the Air	co-pilot of a passenger plane	John Monk Saunders	Laurence Olivier	London Films	uncredited; completed in 1938; extant
1936	Jury's Evidence	Geoffrey	Ralph Ince	Hartley Power, Nora Swinburne	Beaconsfield Studios	a print is preserved in the British Film Institute (BFI) collection
1937	The High Command	Richard Challoner	Thorold Dickinson	Lionel Atwill, Leslie Perrins	Ealing Studios	extant
1938	The Sky's the Limit	Mr. Henry	Jack Buchanan	Mara Losseff	Pinewood Studios	a print is preserved in the British Film Institute (BFI) collection
1949	Trottie True	Earl of Burney	Brian Desmond	Jean Kent, James Donald	Two Cities Films	extant
1950	Drawing-Room Detective		Chick Henderson (writer), Walton Anderson (producer)	Letty Craydon, Roger Moore	BBC Television	

== Sources ==
The National Archives, Kew: Service Record WO 339/74177
