= Binnie Hale =

English actress, singer and dancer (1899–1984)

Hale, c. 1920s

Beatrice "Binnie" Mary Hale-Monro (22 May 1899 – 10 January 1984) was an English actress, singer and dancer. She was one of the most successful musical theatre stars in London in the 1920s and 1930s, able to sing leading roles in operetta as well as musicals, and she was popular as a principal boy in pantomime. Her best-remembered roles were in the musicals No, No, Nanette (1925) and Mr. Cinders (1929), in which she sang "Spread a Little Happiness".

In the 1930s she also pursued a film career and later had a radio show together with her brother Sonnie Hale. She continued to act and sing on stage through the 1950s.

== Life and career ==
Hale was born in West Derby, Liverpool. Her father, John Robert Hale-Minro, and younger brother, Sonnie Hale, were actors.

Hale was one of the most successful stars in London in the 1920s and 1930s, known for her vivacity, and able to sing leading roles in operetta as well as musicals and revue. She debuted in 1916 in three productions: the musical comedy Follow the Crowd, followed by the revue We’re All in It, both at the old Empire Theatre, and in the small role of Annette in the musical Houp La! at the newly opened St. Martin's Theatre. After this, she played in several revues and musical comedies, including 150 Pound Revue (1917), Charlotte in The Kiss Call (1919), Just Fancy and Jumble Sale (1920), Betty in My Nieces (1921), Helen in the London production of Katinka (1923), Puppets and The Odd Spot (both 1924). In 1924, she married the English actor Jack Raine, with whom she had appeared in The Dippers, by Ben Travers in 1922 and in The Odd Spot. They had a daughter, Patricia, born in 1930. The marriage ended in divorce in 1935.

She finally starred in the title role of a hit musical, No, No, Nanette, in 1925 at the Palace Theatre. She also played the title role in the London production of Sunny (1926). She began her film career in 1927 in the short film On with the Dance, with Leslie Henson and her brother. She was Jill in the long-running British musical Mr. Cinders (1929). Her recording of the song "Spread a Little Happiness" from that musical is possibly her best remembered recording. Mr. Cinders was the first of three shows in which she appeared with Bobby Howes. Next, she starred in the title role of Nippy (1930); in Bow Bells, together with her father (1932); and The Dubarry as Jeanne (1932 UK tour).

From 1933 to 1937, Hale made five films. On stage during these years, she played Peggy in Give Me a Ring (1933), Sally in Yes, Madam? (1934, with Howes, who later starred in the film version), Anne in Rise and Shine (1936), and Cochran's Coronation revue Home and Beauty (1937). In 1937, she starred as Roszi in Magyar Melody. In the 1940s, and through most of the 1950s, she played the principal boy in pantomimes and appeared in variety shows, musicals such as Up and Doing (1940) and Flying Colours (1941), and revues including One, Two, Three! (1947, with her brother Sonnie) and Four, Five, Six! (1948, with Howes). Later she was in Out of this World (1950, Frankie Howerd's debut) and The Punch Revue (1955). She and her brother also had a radio series, All Hale. In her last West End role, she played the Duchess and Queen of Hearts in Alice in Wonderland at the Winter Garden Theatre (1959). She then retired to Battle, East Sussex.

She died from bronchopneumonia on 10 January 1984, at the age of 84, at St Helen's Hospital in Hastings, East Sussex.

== Films ==
- On with the Dance (1927)
- This is the Life (1933) – Sarah Tuttle
- Hyde Park Corner (1935) – Sophie
- The Phantom Light (1935) – Alice Bright
- Take a Chance (1937) – Wilhelmina ("Bill") Ryde
- Love from a Stranger (1937) a.k.a. A Night of Terror (USA) – Kate Meadows
- Magyar Melody (1939) (TV) – Roszi Belvary
- One, Two, Three! (1948) (TV)

== Selected stage roles ==
- Houp La! (1916) at St Martin's Theatre with Gertie Millar
- No, No, Nanette (1925) at the Palace Theatre
- Sunny (1926)
- Mr. Cinders (1929) at the London Hippodrome with Bobby Howes
- Nippy (1930) at the Golders Green Hippodrome.
- Give Me a Ring (1933) at the London Hippodrome
- Yes Madam? (1934) at the London Hippodrome, with Howes
- Jack and the Beanstalk (1935), pantomime at the Theatre Royal, Drury Lane
- Flying Colours (1943) at the Lyric Theatre, London
- Four, Five, Six (1948) with Howes
- Out of this World (1950) at the London Palladium with Frankie Howerd
- Peggy Ryan and Ray McDonald (1950) at the Empire Theatre Newcastle
- The Punch Review (1955) at the Duke of York's Theatre, London with Alfie Bass

== Discography ==
- No, No, Nanette (1925)
- "Who?" (1926) with Jack Buchanan, from the musical Sunny
- "I'm a One Man Girl" (1929) with Bobby Howes, and Al Starita and his Novelty Orchestra
- "Spread a Little Happiness" (1929) from the musical Mr. Cinders
- The Debonnaire (date unknown) – with Jack Buchanan and Elsie Randolph
- "As Time Goes By" (1932) with the Savoy Orpheans and Carroll Gibbons, piano
- "You're Blasé" (1932) from the revue Bow Bells
- "Yes Madam?" (1934) with Bobby Howes
- "You Don't Know the Half of It" (1935) from the film Hyde Park Corner
- "A Nice Cup of Tea" (1937) from the revue Home and Beauty by A.P. Herbert (lyrics) and Henry Sullivan (music)

Hale made many other recordings between 1925 and 1941, the majority of which were for the Columbia label in London.
