= Meet My Sister =

1933 film

- Trade advertisement
- Directed by: John Daumery
- Produced by: John Maxwell; Fred Watts
- Starring: Clifford Mollison; Constance Shotter; Enid Stamp-Taylor
- Cinematography: Jack Parker
- Production company: British International Pictures
- Distributed by: Pathé Pictures
- Release date: August 1933
- Running time: 70 minutes
- Country: United Kingdom
- Language: English

Meet My Sister is a 1933 British comedy film directed by Jean Daumery and starring Clifford Mollison, Constance Shotter and Enid Stamp-Taylor. It was made at Welwyn Studios as a quota quickie by British International Pictures.

== Plot ==
A man comes to mistakenly believe that his fiancée is his sister.

== Cast ==
- Clifford Mollison as Lord Victor Wilby
- Constance Shotter as Joan Lynton
- Enid Stamp-Taylor as Lulu Marsoc
- Fred Duprez as Hiram Sowerby
- Frances Drake as Helen Sowerby
- Jimmy Godden as Pogson
- Patrick Barr as Bob Seymour
- Helen Ferrers as Honorable Christine Wilby
- Syd Crossley as Butler

== Reception ==
Kine Weekly wrote: "Farcical comedy, an unpretentious picture which rises above the limitations of its staging and produces capital light entertainment through the excellence of the team work and the ability of the director to keep things well on the move. The amusing complications furnished by the plot are handled with lively and infectious dexterity, and the situations which accrue combine romance and humour in most agreeable proportions."

The Daily Film Renter wrote: "Ingenious gags, amusing dialogue, piquant situations – these have been well blended into an eminently satisfying picture."

Variety wrote: "Some years ago this reviewer touted Clifford Mollison as the best light comedian in musical comedy in England. He's now a film candidate of the same calibre. ... Plenty of hoke, but done in a class manner without vulgarity or slapstick. ... Distinguished settings and intelligent direction."
