= The Luck of a Sailor =

- Camilla Horn, David Manners and Greta Nissen in the film
- Directed by: Robert Milton
- Written by: Horton Giddy (play); Clifford Grey; Wolfgang Wilhelm
- Produced by: Walter C. Mycroft
- Starring: Greta Nissen; David Manners; Clifford Mollison
- Cinematography: Claude Friese-Greene
- Music by: Van Phillips
- Production company: British International Pictures
- Distributed by: Wardour Films
- Release date: May 1934
- Running time: 66 minutes
- Country: United Kingdom
- Language: English

The Luck of a Sailor (also known as Contraband) is a 1934 British romance film directed by Robert Milton and starring Greta Nissen, David Manners and Clifford Mollison. It was written by Clifford Grey and Wolfgang Wilhelm based on the play by Horton Giddy, and was made at Elstree Studios as a quota quickie.

== Plot ==
Prince Karl is the exiled heir to the throne of Amnesia, currently manager of a nightclub in England. As a publicity stunt he marries the penniless Princess Helena. Suddenly, he is recalled to Amnesia as King, and sets sail with his new wife. She is in love with a naval officer, Captain Colin, and by coincidence he is in command of their ship. When Karl succumbs to sea sickness, Helena is free to flirt with Colin. Arriving in Amnesia, Karl discovers that he is expected to marry an heiress, and Helena divorces him, leaving her free to marry Colin.

== Cast ==
- Greta Nissen as Queen Helena
- David Manners as Captain Colin
- Clifford Mollison as Shorty
- Camilla Horn as Louise
- Hugh Wakefield as King Karl
- Lawrence Grossmith as Silvius
- Reginald Purdell as Jenkins
- H. F. Maltby as Admiral
- Jimmy Godden as Betz
- Jean Cadell as Princess Rosanna
- Cecil Ramage as owner
- Gus McNaughton as official
- Arnold Lucy
- J.H. Roberts

== Reception ==
Kine Weekly wrote: "Ruritanian romantic comedy with a nautical flavour which is richer in stars than story values. The plot is pleasant, but so slight that the principal players are seldom given a chance to shine individually."

The Daily Film Renter wrote: "Lack of cohesive story results in draggy production that fails to achieve conviction. None of the half-dozen competent principals given any chance, though pleasant individual portrayals infuse faint spark into proceedings. Disappointing in general values, film is one whose appeal is limited to less critical popular halls."
