= The Unholy Night =

1929 American mystery film

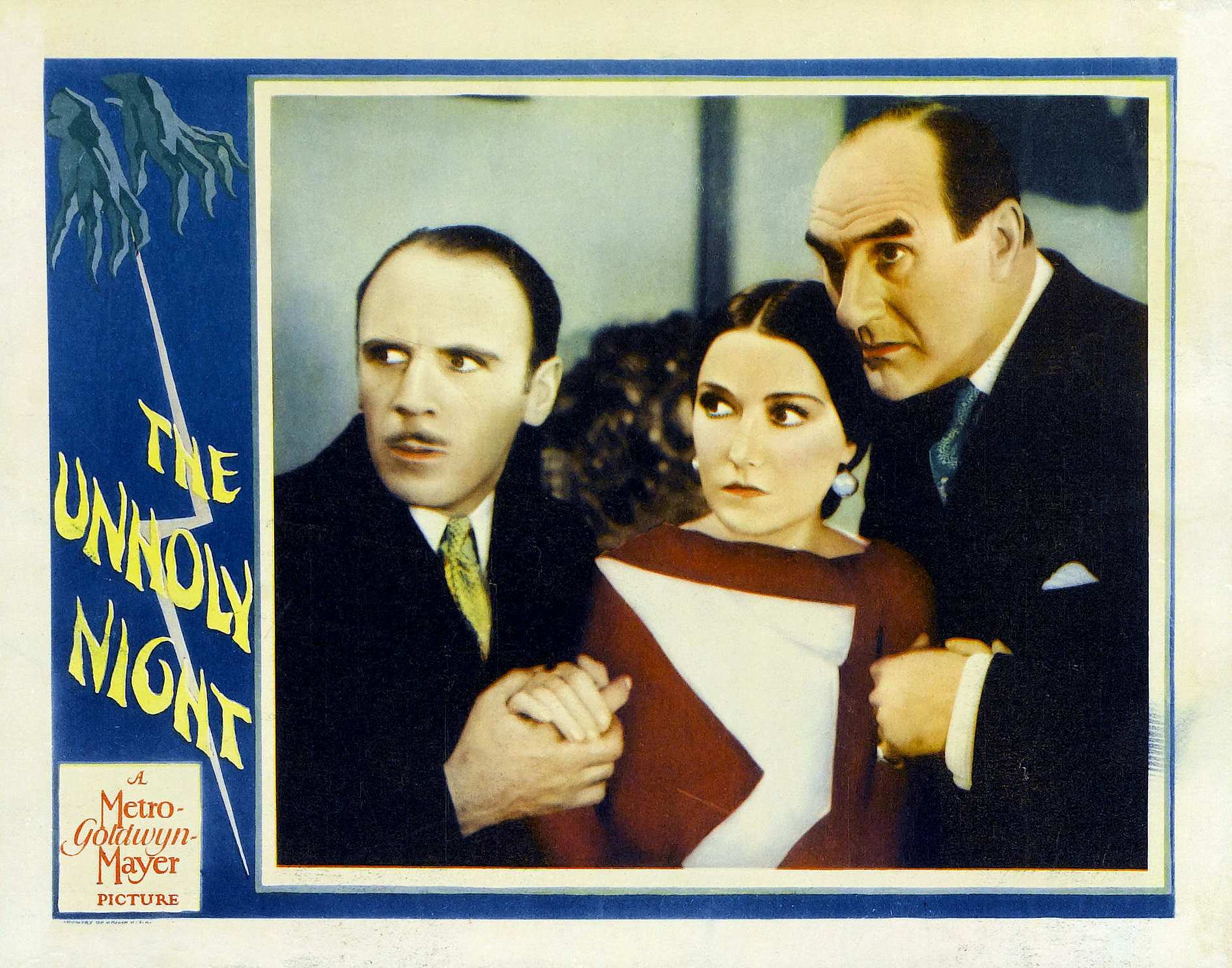
- Lobby card for The Unholy Night
- Directed by: Lionel Barrymore
- Written by: Edwin Justus Mayer
- Screenplay by: Dorothy Farnum
- Based on: The Green Ghost; 1929 story by: Ben Hecht
- Starring: Ernest Torrence; Roland Young
- Cinematography: Ira Morgan
- Edited by: Grant Whytock
- Production company: Metro-Goldwyn-Mayer Corp.
- Distributed by: Metro-Goldwyn-Mayer Distributing Corp.
- Release date: 14 September 1929
- Running time: 92 minutes
- Country: United States
- Language: English

The Unholy Night is a 1929 American pre-Code mystery film directed by Lionel Barrymore and starring Ernest Torrence.

== Plot ==
The film

The well-to-do Lord Montague is assaulted on a fog-enshrouded London street on his way to his club but manages to escape death. He later learns that some unknown assailant is killing off the members of his old army regiment from the Indian War. A Scotland Yard inspector investigating the homicides asks Montague to have the nine remaining members of his regiment assemble at his estate, so as to protect them from being murdered one by one, and so that he can hopefully learn the identity of the assassin, assuming the killer may be one of them.

== Cast ==
- Ernest Torrence as Dr. Richard Ballou
- Roland Young as Lord "Monte" Montague
- Dorothy Sebastian as Lady Efra Cavender
- Natalie Moorhead as Lady Violet 'Vi' Montague
- Sydney Jarvis as Jordan, the butler
- Polly Moran as Polly, the maid
- George Cooper as Fry the Orderly
- Sōjin Kamiyama as Lee Han, the mystic
- Claude Fleming as Sir James Rumsey
- Clarence Geldart as Inspector Lewis
- John Miljan as Major Arthur Mallory
- Richard Tucker as Colonel Davidson
- John Loder as Captain Dorchester
- Philip Strange as Lieutenant Williams
- John Roche as Lieutenant Savor
- Lionel Belmore as Major David Endicott
- Gerald Barry as Captain Bradley
- Richard Travers as Major "Mac" McDougal
- Boris Karloff as Abdul, the lawyer (uncredited)

== Production ==
According to Exhibitors Herald-World published on April 20, 1929, the film began production under the working title The Green Ghost on 1 March 1929. Initially, Rupert Julian was signed to direct the film as his first 100% dialogue feature. The film's screenplay was written by Edwin Justus Mayer and adapted by Dorothy Farnum based on the short story The Green Ghost by Ben Hecht. The films intertitles were by Joe Farnum.

According to an article in Motion Picture News, Julian voluntarily withdrew from the production stating he was not comfortable directing a sound film, and wanted to earn more experience with shorts first. It has not been determined if any of Julian's work was retained in the released film. Lionel Barrymore took over as director, which would be his second sound film as a director.

== Release ==
The Unholy Night was distributed theatrically by Metro-Goldwyn-Mayer Distributing Corp. on 14 September 1929.

Barrymore co-directed (with French director Jacques Feyder) a French-language version of the film called Le Spectre Vert (The Green Ghost) which was released in France. This French-language version was never released in the US. Dorothy Farnum and Yves Mirande adapted the screenplay. It was Feyder's first sound film, and the first French-language film ever made in Hollywood as well. It was released in France in 1930.

== Reception ==
=== Contemporary reviews ===
From contemporary reviews, Photoplay declared the film a "Swell mystery story, artistically directed by Lionel Barrymore. Roland Young and Dorothy Sebastian are great." A review in Movie Age noted that "we have seen this on previous occasions in various forms as far as plot is concerned but treatment and direction lifts it out of the rut." A reviewer from Film Daily found that "the story has been done before in various forms" but that Ben Hecht's "masterly story telling style made it appear better than the theme and plot really are."

New Movie Magazine stated that the film was "a bully mystery melodrama and the best of months. You will never guess the real murderer until the denouement" and praised the performances of Dorothy Sebastian.

In contrast, Variety declared the film "a hopelessly involved script handled by Lionel Barrymore in a way that would discredit a quickie director. Worse than the worst would-be thriller meller staged on Broadway and impressing as a pointless souffle burlesquing them all," concluding that the film was "a one hundred percent lemon."

=== Retrospective ===
Michael R. Pitts commented in his book on obscure genre films between 1928 and 1936 that the film "consists of talk with little physical action" and that "the film moves at a fairly good pace, contains fine performances and is atmospheric in its London fog scenes and in the old mansion in which the story takes place." Pitts did note that the film was overlong and "somewhat static and a bit creaky" by contemporary standards, but that "it holds up well and provides several doses of cinematic chills, especially during the climactic seance."

Critic Roy Kinnard commented, "This melodramatic but rather tame detective mystery relied almost entirely on dialogue to advance its plot. Boris Karloff...is among the supporting players."

Film critic and historian Troy Howarth declared that "If the film is any indication of Barrymore's overall directing talent, it's no surprise that he eventually returned his focus exclusively to acting" and found the film "painfully creaky and melodramatic...unfolding in painfully static medium and long shots." Howarth commented on Boris Karloff in the role of Abdul, the Hindu lawyer, who "takes advantage of his naturally dark complexion but...struggles terribly with the thick Indian accent."

Leonard Maltin gave the film two stars, calling it a "stagy Ben Hecht melodrama with much hamming, especially by unbilled Karloff."

== See also ==
- Boris Karloff filmography
- Lionel Barrymore filmography
- List of early sound feature films (1926–1929)
