= Borrowed Clothes =

1934 British film by Arthur Maude

- Lester Matthews and Anne Grey in a publicity still for the film
- Directed by: Arthur Maude
- Written by: Aimée Stuart; Philip Stuart
- Starring: Anne Grey; Lester Matthews; Sunday Wilshin
- Cinematography: Geoffrey Faithfull
- Production company: Arthur Maude Productions
- Distributed by: Columbia Pictures
- Release date: March 1934
- Running time: 70 minutes
- Country: United Kingdom
- Language: English

Borrowed Clothes is a 1934 British comedy-drama film directed by Arthur Maude and starring Anne Grey, Lester Matthews and Sunday Wilshin. It was written by Aimée Stuart and Philip Stuart based on their 1929 play Her Shop, and was made as a quota quickie for release by Columbia Pictures.

== Preservation status ==
The British Film Institute National Archive holds a collection of stills but no film or video materials.

== Plot ==
Lady Mary Torrent angers her husband Henry with her extravagant spending on fashionable gowns. When she tries to re-sell them to a London fashion retailer, she discovers that due to a misundersanding, she has bought the actual shop. After a period when the shop does poor business and Henry is lonely without his wife at home, the original owners buy back the shop, and Lady Mary returns, chastised, to her husband.

== Cast ==
- Anne Grey as Lady Mary Torrent
- Lester Matthews as Sir Harry Torrent
- Sunday Wilshin as Lottie Forrest
- Joe Hayman as Herman Jacob
- Renée Macready as Diana Arbuthnot
- P.G. Clark as Donald MacDonald
- Philip Strange as Clarence Ponsonby
- Anthony Holles as Gilbert Pinkley
- Elizabeth Inglis as Barbara
- Constance Shotter as Babette

== Reception ==
Kine Weekly wrote: "The tempo is regrettably slow, the indifferent quality of the dialogue is accentuated by the players' uninspired delivery, and the characterisation, with the exception of the lead, is palpably weak. What might have been quite a pleasant trifle for an idea is here is deprived of good entertainment by an amateurish scenario and poor direction. A second feature for unexacting patrons."

The Daily Film Renter wrote: "Feeble comedy of extravagant wife who unwittingly becomes owner of a modiste's shop, but manages to sell it back at the moment she is in danger of bankruptcy. Very much over-acted, and humour weakly expressed, with production qualities also very ordinary."

Picture Show wrote: "A quite good idea has been mis-handled in this film. ... The comedy lacks sparkle – when it is amusing – and there Is far too much of the domestic bickerings between the lady and her husband."
