= Brides to Be =

1934 British film by Reginald Denham

- Olive Stone and Betty Stockwell in the film
- Directed by: Reginald Denham
- Written by: Basil Mason
- Produced by: Reginald Denham
- Starring: Betty Stockfeld; Constance Shotter; Ronald Ward
- Production company: British and Dominions
- Distributed by: Paramount British Pictures
- Release date: May 1934
- Running time: 68 minutes
- Country: United Kingdom
- Language: English

Brides to Be is a 1934 British comedy film directed by Reginald Denham and starring Betty Stockfeld, Constance Shotter and Ronald Ward. It was written by Basil Mason and made at Elstree Studios as a quota quickie for release by the British branch of Paramount Pictures.

== Preservation status ==
The British Film Institute National Archive holds a collection of ephemera and stills but no film or video materials.

== Plot ==
When her manager pursues her romantically, Audrey Bland quits her job in the packing department of the department store Snell and Freemantle, and gets a job in their gifts department. At a local hotel, wealthy young man-about-town George Hutton is being duped by two crooks, one of whom persuades him to get engaged to her. On visiting Snell and Freemantle, George falls for Audrey, and the crooks try to frame her for a theft.

== Cast ==
- Betty Stockfeld as Audrey Bland
- Constance Shotter as Maisie Beringer
- Ronald Ward as George Hutton
- Olive Sloane as Phyllis Hopper
- Henry Oscar as Laurie Randall
- Ivor Barnard as John Boyle
- Gorgon McLeod as Snell

== Reception ==
The Daily Film Renter wrote: "Artless narrative leading up to fatuous climax, with undistinguished acting and dialogue. Quota ranking for the uncritical. ... There is certainly the germ of an idea in the plot, but the crudity of the dialogue and the naivete of the acting even militate against that."

Picture Show wrote: "This is not a film that resounds to the credit of British studios, although the leading players struggle manfully with the poor material given them. ... It is told very monotonously, lack of good situations intensifying the slowness of its pace, while the less said about the dialogue the better."
