= Frank Forest =

American opera singer (1896–1976)

Frank Forest singing the act I love duet from Madama Butterfly with Grace Moore in the 1937 picture I'll Take Romance.

Frank Forest (1896–1976) was an American operatic tenor and actor who enjoyed success in the 1930s and 1940s.

== Biography ==
Frank Forest was born Frank Hayek ("Hájek" meaning "small grove/forest" in Czech) in St. Paul, Minnesota on October 17, 1896. His father was an immigrant from Nieder Rochlitz (now Dolní Rokytnice) of Czech and Sudeten-German origin, working as a mail carrier. Frank began the study of music at 7 years and voice training with the St. Paul, Minnesota choir as a soloist He studied pianoforte and singing and at twelve was singing as a soloist in a church choir. At seventeen he taught piano and voice. Later he went to New York City and became a salesman, eventually becoming a sales manager. He studied singing in Italy and made his operatic debut in 1928, becoming famous in operatic circles.

Forest studied agricultural engineering at the University of Minnesota, and later helped found the profitable pharmaceutical firm White Laboratories of Kenilworth, New Jersey. He gave up the business to follow a lifelong interest in singing. He spent twelve years performing leading tenor roles in opera houses all over Europe and acted in several films, including I'll Take Romance along with American soprano and actress Grace Moore in 1937. In 1955 he started pouring his energies and money into the creation of the Empire State Festival, a New York City summer opera festival. Frank Forest died on December 23, 1976, in Santa Monica, California and is buried at Hillside Memorial Park in Redlands, California.

== Filmography ==
- For Love of You (1933) as 'Franco Foresta'
- The Big Broadcast of 1937 (1936) – Frank Rossman
- Champagne Waltz (1937) – Karl Lieberlich
- I'll Take Romance (1937) – Pinkerton (from Madama Butterfly)
- Take It Big (1944) – Harvey Phillips
