= Sporting Goods =

1928 film

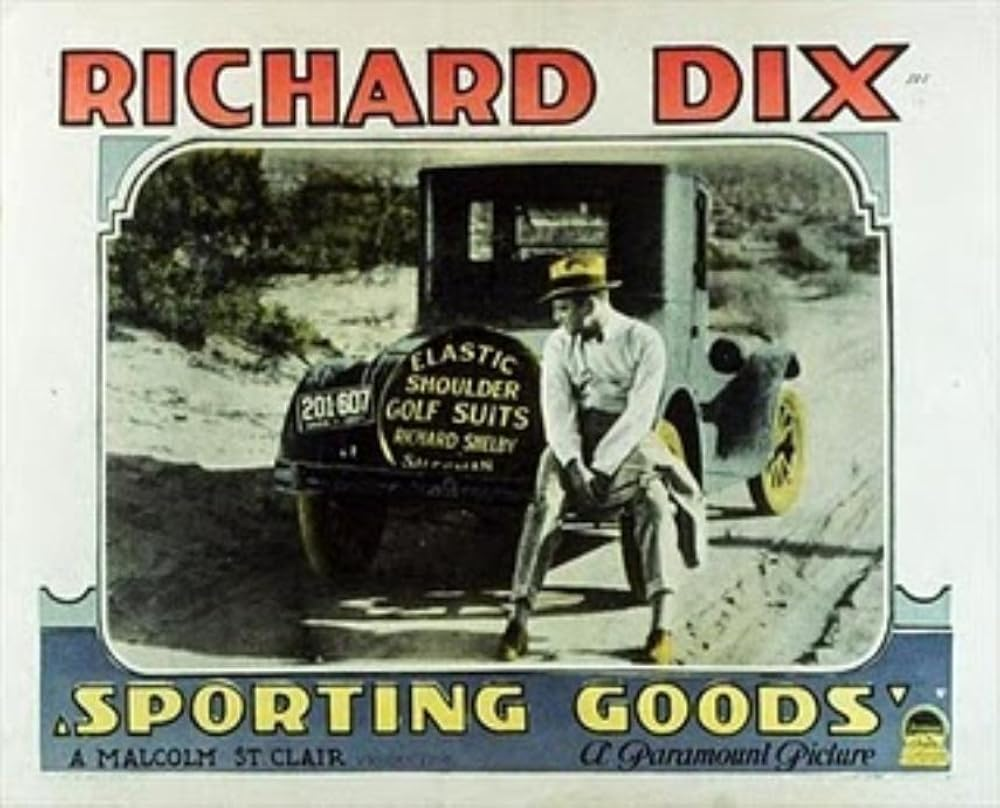
- Directed by: Malcolm St. Clair
- Screenplay by: George Marion Jr. Ray Harris; Thomas J. Crizer
- Produced by: Jesse L. Lasky; Adolph Zukor
- Starring: Richard Dix; Ford Sterling; Gertrude Olmstead; Philip Strange; Myrtle Stedman; Wade Boteler; Claude King
- Cinematography: Edward Cronjager
- Edited by: Otho Lovering
- Production company: Famous Players–Lasky Corporation
- Distributed by: Paramount Pictures
- Release date: February 11, 1928
- Running time: 60 minutes
- Country: United States
- Language: English

Sporting Goods is a lost 1928 American comedy silent film directed by Malcolm St. Clair, written by George Marion Jr., Ray Harris and Thomas J. Crizer, and starring Richard Dix, Ford Sterling, Gertrude Olmstead, Philip Strange, Myrtle Stedman, Wade Boteler and Claude King. It was released on February 11, 1928, by Paramount Pictures.

== Cast ==
- Richard Dix as Richard Shelby
- Ford Sterling as Mr. Jordan
- Gertrude Olmstead as Alice Elliott
- Philip Strange as Henry Thorpe
- Myrtle Stedman as Mrs. Elliott
- Wade Boteler as Regan
- Claude King as Timothy Stanfield
- Maude Turner Gordon as Mrs. Stanfield

== Reception ==
Time magazine called the movie a "fossilated farce" which was "more interested in scenery than story":

Richard Dix, as a brawny, broken-nosed, commercial traveler, twines love and business, achieving girl and commission. It gags and gurgles about the young salesman and his sweetie who admires him for being both opulent and deceitful. Ethics are somewhat mixed, the principals in an excellent poker sequence shifting cards until Dix acquires four of a kind, raking in thereby $4,000.
