= Vengeance (1930 film) =

1930 film

- Directed by: Archie Mayo
- Screenplay by: F. Hugh Herbert
- Story by: Ralph Graves
- Produced by: Harry Cohn
- Starring: Jack Holt; Dorothy Revier
- Cinematography: Ben F. Reynolds
- Edited by: Gene Milford
- Release date: February 22, 1930
- Running time: 1h 6min
- Country: United States

Vengeance is a 1930 American pre-Code drama film directed by Archie Mayo and starring Jack Holt and Dorothy Revier.

== Cast ==
- Jack Holt - John Meadham
- Dorothy Revier - Margaret Summers
- Philip Strange - Charles Summers
- George Pearce - Doctor
- Hayden Stevenson - Ambassador
- Irma Harrison - Nidia
- Onest Conley - Chief
