= The Ace of Cads =

1926 film

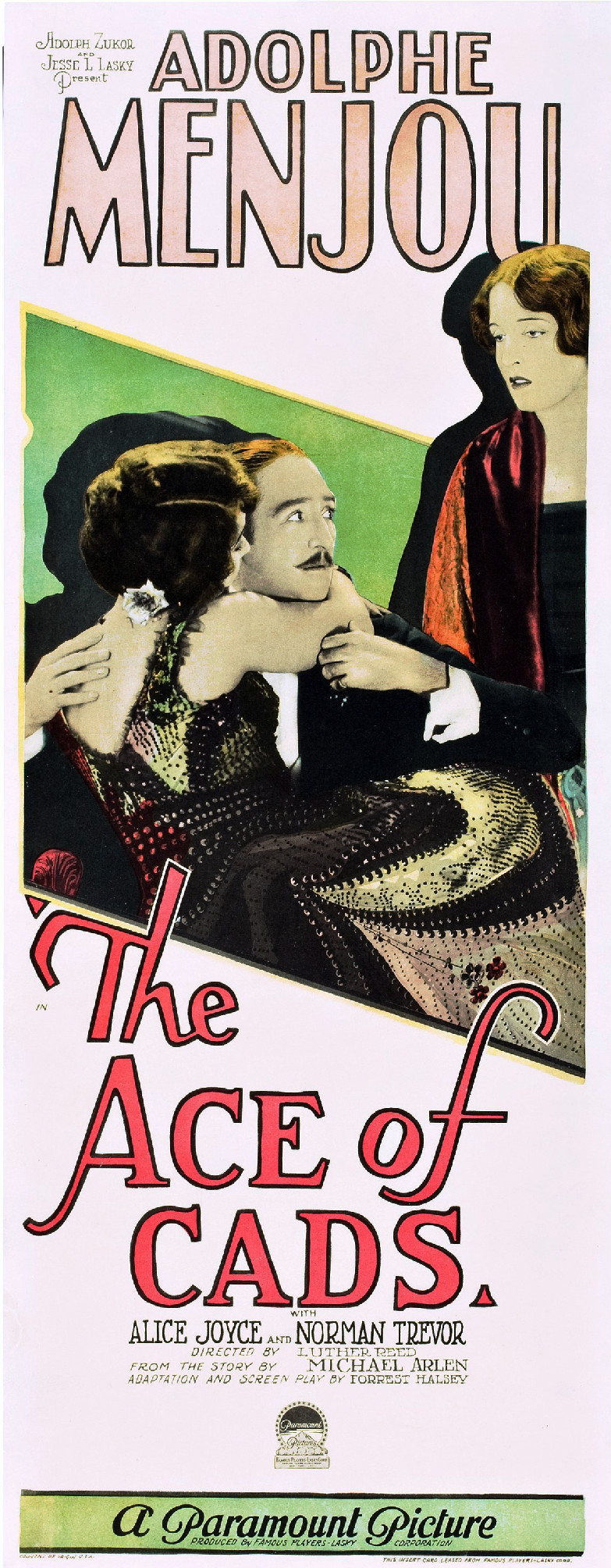
- Film poster
- Directed by: Luther Reed
- Written by: Forrest Halsey
- Based on: "The Ace of Cads" by Michael Arlen
- Produced by: Adolph Zukor; Jesse Lasky; William Le Baron
- Starring: Adolphe Menjou; Alice Joyce
- Cinematography: J. Roy Hunt
- Distributed by: Paramount Pictures
- Release date: October 11, 1926 (United States)
- Running time: 70 minutes
- Country: United States
- Language: Silent (English intertitles)

The Ace of Cads is a 1926 American silent romantic drama film produced by Famous Players–Lasky and distributed by Paramount Pictures. It was directed by Luther Reed and starred Adolphe Menjou and Alice Joyce. The film is an adaptation of a Michael Arlen story of the same name.

== Cast ==
- Adolphe Menjou as Chappel Maturin
- Alice Joyce as Eleanour
- Norman Trevor as Sir Guy de Gramercy
- Philip Strange as Basil de Gramercy
- Suzanne Fleming as Joan

== Preservation ==
With no prints of The Ace of Cads located in any film archives, it is a lost film.
