= The Popular Sin =

1926 film

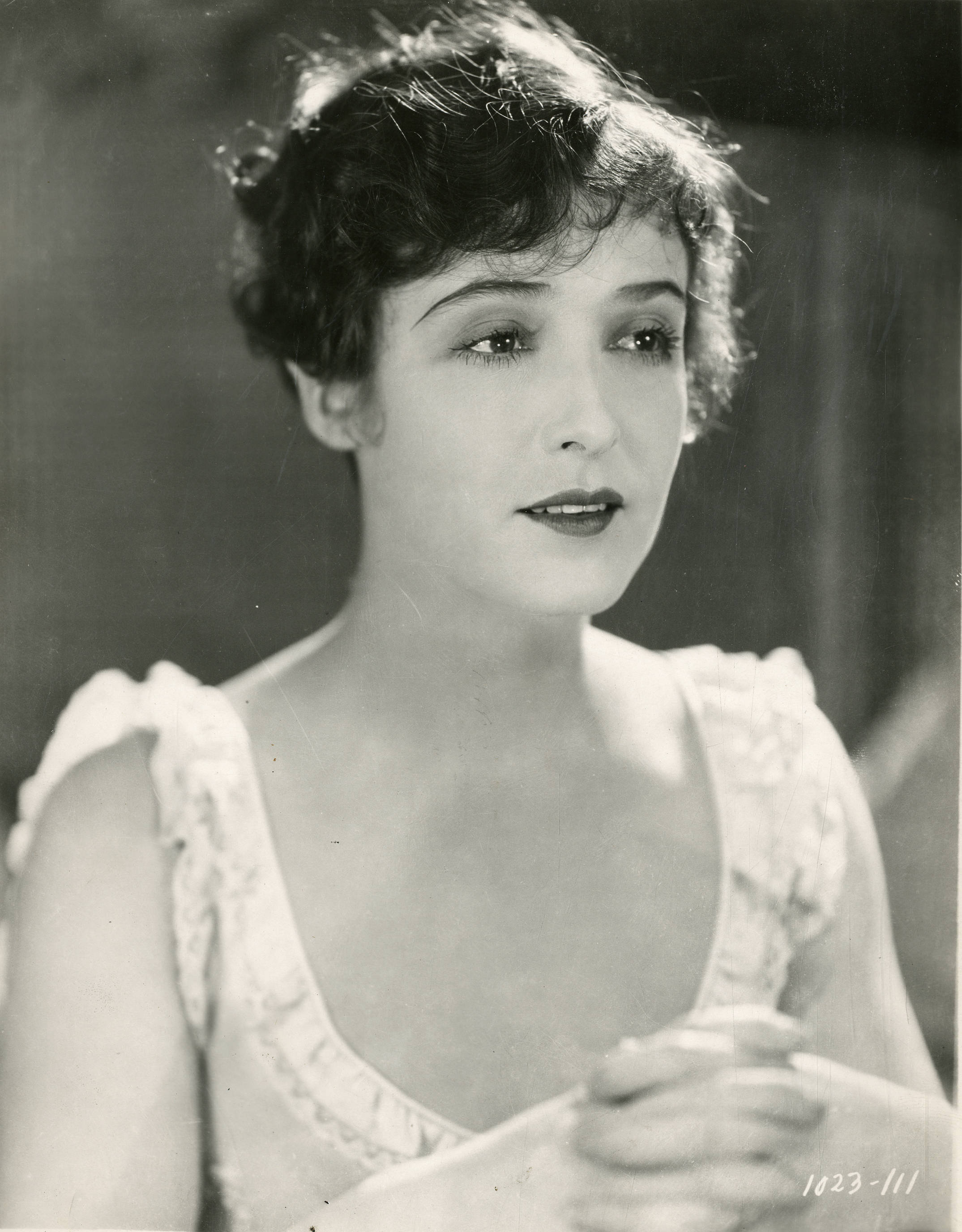
- Still with Vidor
- Directed by: Malcolm St. Clair
- Screenplay by: Monta Bell; James Ashmore Creelman
- Produced by: William LeBaron; Jesse L. Lasky; Adolph Zukor
- Starring: Florence Vidor; Clive Brook; Greta Nissen; Philip Strange; George Beranger; Iris Gray
- Cinematography: Lee Garmes
- Production company: Famous Players–Lasky Corporation
- Distributed by: Paramount Pictures
- Release date: November 22, 1926
- Running time: 70 minutes
- Country: United States
- Language: Silent (English intertitles)

The Popular Sin is a 1926 American silent comedy film directed by Malcolm St. Clair, written by Monta Bell and James Ashmore Creelman, and starring Florence Vidor, Clive Brook, Greta Nissen, Philip Strange, George Beranger, and Iris Gray. It was released on November 22, 1926, by Paramount Pictures.

== Cast ==
- Florence Vidor as Yvonne Montfort
- Clive Brook as Jean Corot
- Greta Nissen as La Belle Toulaise
- Philip Strange as George Montfort
- George Beranger as Alphonse Martin
- Iris Gray as Lulu

== Preservation ==
With no prints of The Popular Sin located in any film archives, it is currently a lost film. Only fragments of reel 6 are in the Library of Congress collection.
