= Off the Dole =

- Theatrical release poster
- Directed by: Arthur Mertz
- Written by: John E. Blakeley; Arthur Mertz
- Produced by: John E. Blakeley
- Starring: George Formby; Beryl Formby; Constance Shotter; Dan Crisp; James Plant
- Cinematography: John W. Boyle
- Edited by: Dennis Cantlan
- Music by: Arthur L Ward
- Production company: Mancunian Film Corporation
- Release date: September 1935
- Running time: 87 minutes
- Country: United Kingdom
- Language: English

Off the Dole is a 1935 British film directed by Arthur Metz and starring George Formby and Beryl Formby. It was written by John E. Blakeley and Mertz.

Formby appears as John Willie, a stage character originally developed by his father, George Formby, Sr.

== Plot ==
John Willie has his dole money denied him for moonlighting and not trying to find work. His uncle asks him to take over his detective agency.

== Cast ==
- George Formby as John Willie
- Beryl Formby as Grace, Charm and Ability
- Constance Shotter as Irene
- Dan Crisp as The Inimitable Dude
- James Plant as Crisp and Debonaire
- Stan Pell as The Most Inoffensive Parson
- Stan Little as Little Jack
- Tully Comber as Measured for his Part
- Clifford McLaglen as A Villain and Proud of It
- Wally Patch as Revels in his Part

== Production ==
Off the Dole cost £8,000 to make, and earned £30,000 at the box office.

== Reception ==
Kine Weekly wrote: "Very slight, inconsequent story inks up a series of music hall sketches and song numbers chiefly designed to exploit George Formby's particular brand of Lancashire humour. The comedy is broad and ingenuous, and the production adequate. Suitable chiefly for the more popular and industrial halls."

The Daily Film Renter wrote: "Film does not come under usual category, being series of turns staged in settings that include labour exchange, nudist colony, club and schoolroom. Main entertainment is forthcoming from star, whose eccentric comedy antics, songs and ukelele work will please his legion of followers."

According to Formby's biographer, the cultural historian Jeffrey Richards, this and Formby's previous film, Boots! Boots! (1934), "are an invaluable record of the pre-cinematic Formby at work".
