= Constance Shotter =

British actress (1911–1989)

- Born: 5 October 1911; London, UK
- Died: 1989 (aged 77–78)
- Other names: Constance Ada Shotter, Lady Taylor
- Occupation: actress
- Years active: 1932–1935
- Spouses: Adney Gibbons (m. 1928) Charles Stuart Taylor (m. 1928; died 1989)
- Children: 4 sons, 1 daughter
- Relatives: Winifred Shotter (sister)

Constance Ada Shotter, Lady Taylor (5 October 1911 – 1989) was a British actress who appeared in several films in the 1930s.

== Biography ==
Shotter was born in London.By 1926 she was a chorus dancer, appearing in The Midnight Follies a Dinner, Dancing and Review by A. P. Herbert, choreographed by Penelope Spencer. Like her sister she moved from the chorus line and appeared in a series of British films in the 1930s.

Shotter married firstly Adney Gibbons, son of Walter Gibbons, in 1928. They had a son. She married secondly Charles Stuart Taylor, Member of Parliament for Eastbourne on 20 May 1936. They had four children.

== Selected filmography ==
- For the Love of Mike (1932)
- Meet My Sister (1933)
- To Brighton with Gladys (1933)
- Brides to Be (1934)
- Borrowed Clothes (1934)
- Royal Cavalcade (1935)
- Off the Dole (1935)
