= Going Gay =

1933 film directed by Carmine Gallone

- Opening titles
- Directed by: Carmine Gallone
- Written by: Selwyn Jepson; K.R.G. Browne; Jack Marks
- Produced by: Frank Richardson; Louis Whitman
- Starring: Arthur Riscoe; Naunton Wayne; Magda Schneider
- Cinematography: Willy Goldberger
- Edited by: Thorold Dickinson
- Music by: W.L. Trytel
- Production company: Windsor Films
- Distributed by: Sterling Films
- Release date: 30 September 1933
- Running time: 78 minutes
- Country: United Kingdom
- Language: English

Going Gay (also known as Kiss Me Goodbye) is a 1933 British musical film directed by Carmine Gallone and starring Arthur Riscoe, Naunton Wayne and Magda Schneider. It was written by Selwyn Jepson, K.R.G. Browne and Jack Marks and was made at British and Dominion's Elstree Studios. It was followed by a sequel For Love of You, also released the same year.

== Plot ==
English friends in Vienna are rivals in love for a lady singer, but both unite in their attempts to make her a star of the opera.

== Cast ==
- Arthur Riscoe as Jack
- Naunton Wayne as Jim
- Magda Schneider as Grete, a Viennese girl
- Ruth Maitland as mother
- Victor Fairley as Grete's father
- Richard Wydler as Grete's brother
- Brenda Senton as Grete's sister
- Wilfred Noy as Director of Opera Falkenheim
- Grete Natzler as Director of Opera's daughter
- Joe Hayman as impresario
- Bertha Belmore as masculine lady at table ten

== Reception ==
Kine Weekly wrote: "A happy, carefree piece of sentimental fooling, with occasional musical accompaniment, which ignores such considered essentials as a strong story and brisk continuity, yet nevertheless succeeds in providing delightful diversion."

The Daily Film Renter wrote: "Naive and slow-moving story ... Arthur Riscoe and Naunton Wayne hardly make good on the screen, and suffer from paucity of material at their command. Very good photography excellent shots of Vienna, and one or two tuneful musical numbers are principal points of appeal, but material is crude. Unsophisticated patrons may be mildly entertained in parts."

Picture Show wrote: "Musical romance with plenty of comedy, most of which falls on the capable shoulders of Arthur Riscoe. ... Charming Viennese settings, excellent acting which gives the film moments of gaiety."
