= For Love of You =

1933 film directed by Carmine Gallone

- Directed by: Carmine Gallone
- Written by: Selwyn Jepson
- Produced by: Frank Richardson
- Starring: Arthur Riscoe; Naunton Wayne; Franco Foresta
- Cinematography: Willy Goldberger
- Edited by: Thorold Dickinson
- Music by: W.L. Trytel
- Production company: Windsor Films
- Distributed by: Sterling Films
- Release date: November 1933
- Running time: 77 minutes
- Country: United Kingdom
- Language: English

For Love of You is a 1933 British musical comedy film directed by Carmine Gallone and starring Arthur Riscoe, Naunton Wayne and Franco Foresta. It was made at British and Dominions Elstree Studios. It is the sequel to Going Gay.

The film's sets were designed by the art director R. Holmes Paul.

== Cast ==
- Arthur Riscoe as Jack
- Naunton Wayne as Jim
- Franco Foresta as The Tenor
- Diana Napier as The Wife
- Pearl Osgood as The Girl
- Valerie Hobson as Minor Role

== Bibliography ==
- Low, Rachael. Filmmaking in 1930s Britain. George Allen & Unwin, 1985.
- Wood, Linda. British Films, 1927-1939. British Film Institute, 1986.
