= Spread a Little Happiness =

Song by Vivian Ellis and Clifford Grey

Song by Binnie Hale
- Released: 1929
- Composer: Vivian Ellis
- Lyricist: Clifford Grey

"Spread a Little Happiness" is a song by the musical comedy composer Vivian Ellis and writer Clifford Grey from their 1929 West End musical Mr. Cinders. In the original production it was sung by Binnie Hale as the character Jill Kemp; a recording of her performance of the song was released by Columbia in 1929.

In 1982, the song was sung in a revival of Mr Cinders at the King's Head Theatre, London and later at the Fortune Theatre after the show was transferred there. In this revised version the song was sung by Jim Lancaster, the male lead, rather than by Jill.

The song was used as the theme tune for a 2009 BBC Radio 4 comedy series of the same title, written by John Godber and Jane Thornton, set in a Yorkshire sandwich bar.

== Sting version ==
"Spread a Little Happiness"

Single by Sting

from the album Brimstone & Treacle (soundtrack)
- B-side: "Only You"
- Released: 6 August 1982
- Length: 3:25
- Label: A&M
- Composer: Vivian Ellis
- Lyricist: Clifford Grey

Sting singles chronology
"Spread a Little Happiness" (1982)	"If You Love Somebody Set Them Free" (1985)

In 1982, English musician Sting covered the song for the soundtrack of the film Brimstone and Treacle, reaching number 16 in the UK.

=== Charts ===
==== Weekly charts ====
Chart (1982)	Peak position
Australia (Kent Music Report)	80
Ireland (IRMA)	16
Israel (IBA)	37
UK Singles (OCC)	16

== Other usage ==
Comic book series The Sandman, published by the DC Comics imprint Vertigo, includes a piece of the song in issue #6 24 hours (1989), written by Neil Gaiman and illustrated by Mike Dringenberg and Malcolm Jones III

== Sources ==
- Gänzl, Kurt; Andrew Lamb (1988). Gänzl's Book of the Musical Theatre. London: The Bodley Head. OCLC 966051934.
- Gordon, Robert; Olaf Jubin (2017). The Oxford Handbook of the British musical. London: Hodder & Stoughton. ISBN 978-0-19-998874-7.
