= Patricia Malone =

British actress (1899–1971)

Patricia Malone, 1916. Play unknown.

Patricia Malone (1899 – 1971) was an English stage actress.

Pat Malone was the daughter of a London theatrical director, Captain J.A.E. Malone (died 1928) and she began acting at an early age. She married actor, comedian and singer Bobby Howes and they had two children, the actress Sally Ann Howes and the musician Peter Howes. Her brother, Pat Malone, was also an actor and appeared on stage, TV, and film. Her grandfather, Joseph Malone, was awarded the Victoria Cross in 1854 during the Crimean War.

She was a musical performer who appeared in André Charlot's Charlot's Revue, which also included Beatrice Lillie and Gertrude Lawrence.

== Theatre ==
- Charlot's Revue
- Little Accident! (1929) - Apollo Theatre, London
