= Mr. Cinders =

1928 musical

Mr Cinders is a 1928 musical with music by Vivian Ellis and Richard Myers and a libretto by Clifford Grey and Greatrex Newman. The story is an inversion of the Cinderella fairy tale with the gender roles reversed. The Prince Charming character has become a modern (1928) young and forceful woman, and Mr Cinders is a menial.

== History ==
Mr Cinders was originally produced under the management of Julian Wylie at the Opera House Theatre, Blackpool on 25 September 1928 for two weeks, and toured through Liverpool, Manchester, Edinburgh, Sunderland, Birmingham, Sheffield, Leeds, Newcastle, Bradford, and Glasgow until 26 January 1929. It opened in London at the Adelphi Theatre under the management of J. C. Williamson Ltd. on 11 February 1929, transferring to the Hippodrome, London on 15 July 1929. It closed on 29 March 1930 after a total of 529 performances.

== Roles and original cast ==
- Jim Lancaster – Bobby Howes
- Jill Kemp – Binnie Hale
- Lumley Lancaster – David Hutcheson / Jack Melford
- Minerva Kemp – Eileen Redcott / Reita Nugent
- Guy Lancaster – Basil Howes
- Phyllis Patterson – Betty Ann Davies (as Betty Davies) / Lorna Hubbard
- Sir George Lancaster – Jack Heller / Sebastian Smith
- Lady Lancaster – Ruth Maitland
- Lucy Smith – Rene Mallory
- Henry Kemp – Charles Cautley
- Smith the Butler – Harry Pringle / Thorp Devereux
- P.C. Merks – A. G. Poulton / Paddy Dupres
- Donna Lucia D'Esmeralda – Edith Savile
- Hodgins – Phil Lester

Source: The British Musical Theatre (Volume 2).

== Synopsis ==
Jim is the adopted and put-upon son of Sir George Lancaster and his snobbish and cruel wife, Lady Agatha Lancaster, the widow of Sir General Bloodwing Beardsley. Jim works as a menial at Merton Chase, their elegant home. Lady Agatha dominates her weak husband and plots to marry her two foppish sons, Lumley and Guy (from her previous marriage) to wealthy girls, since the Lancasters have lost their fortune. Guy, however, is in love with a woman named Phyllis Patterson, whom Agatha rejects because of her lack of money. Jim keeps his spirits high, with the philosophy that one should Spread a Little Happiness. Jill is an American heiress who lives next door at a stately home, The Towers, with her wealthy father Henry Kemp and her cousin Minerva (who, like Jim, is the poor relation of her family).

When Guy is credited with saving Henry from drowning (a task which Jim actually accomplished, unbeknownst to anyone but him and Guy), all at Merton Chase are invited to a costume ball at The Towers, but Jim is not allowed to attend. Jill, meanwhile, has disguised herself as a servant girl, Sarah Jones, in order to hide from a police officer who has accused her of physical assault on him. Minerva pretends to be Jill, and every man at Merton Chase is captivated by her beauty.

Jim, with the help of Jill, gatecrashes the ball disguised as a famous South American explorer, the Earl of Ditcham. Lumley reveals that Jim is an imposter. Also, Jill's priceless necklace is found in Jim's pocket, leading everyone at the ball to believe that he stole it. Jill helps Jim escape, and they capture Smith the butler, the real thief, and leave him tied up for the authorities to arrest. After the ball, a hat is found that belongs to the valiant person who captured the thief (instead of the glass slipper). A search for the owner shows that it fits only Jim. He wins the £1,000 reward and learns that the maid "Sarah" is actually Jill, and she and Jim agree to get married. Lumley and Guy, meanwhile, announce their engagements to Minerva and Phyllis, respectively. All ends happily.

== Musical numbers ==
The principal musical numbers in the 1929 version were:

- True to Two – Lumley
- I'm a One Man Girl – Jill, Jim
- On with the Dance – Minerva (Lumley's girlfriend)
- "Spread a Little Happiness" – Jill
- She's My Lovely – Kemp
- Ev'ry Little Moment – Minerva, Lumley
- I've Got You, You've Got Me – Jill, Jim
- The Swan – (instrumental)

Source: Faber Music.

Gänzl and Lamb's survey of Musical Theatre also mentions "The Seventeenth Century Rag", "Please, Mr Cinders", "On the Amazon" and "A Honeymoon for Four". Several songs written for the show were dropped during the pre-London tour: "Paradise Bound", "Where's Jim?", "Oh, What You Can Do to Me", and "I Could Get Used to You".

The numbers in the 1983 revival were: 1. Tennis - Lady Lancaster, Guy, Lumley & Ensemble 2. Blue Blood - Lady Lancaster, Guy, Lumley & Ensemble 3. True To Two - Lumley, Enid, & Cynthia 4. I Want The World To Know - Guy & Phyllis 5. One-Man Girl - Jim & Jill 6. On With the Dance - Minerva, Lumley, Guy & Ensemble 7. Dying Swan - Instrumental 8. At The Ball - Jim, Guy, Lumley 9. Spread A Little Happiness - Jim 10. Spread A Little Happiness (Reprise) - Jill 11. The 18th Century Drag - Minerva 12. On The Amazon - Jim 13. 18th Century Drag (Reprise) - Jim, Sir George & Ensemble 14. Please, Mr. Cinders - Jill 15. She's My Lovely - Jim 16. Every Little Moment - Minerva & Lumley 17. I've Got You - Jim & Jill 18. Honeymoon For Four - Guy, Phyllis, Lumley & Minerva 19. Spread a Little Happiness (Finale) - Full Cast (minus Lady Lancaster) from The Guide To Musical Theatre

== Revivals ==
An Australian production opened at Her Majesty's Theatre, Sydney in July 1930. A German production, under the title Jim und Jill was given at the Bürgertheater, Vienna in February 1931.

The show was revived in 1982 in London in a revised version, under the supervision of Ellis and Newman. It opened on 31 December at the King's Head Theatre and was transferred to the Fortune Theatre on 27 April 1983. Denis Lawson starred as Jim Lancaster, with Julia Josephs (later succeeded by Christina Matthews) as Jill, Diana Martin as Minerva, Graham Hoadly as Lumley, and Philip Bird (succeeded by Steven Pacey) as Guy. The hit song from the score, "Spread a Little Happiness", was given to Jim, rather than to Jill who sang it in the original version. The song "She's My Lovely" from Ellis's show Hide and Seek was interpolated, and "Please, Mr Cinders", was written by Greatrex Newman and Vivian Ellis (in collaboration over the telephone) especially for the revival's transfer to the West End.

Two cast recordings were made of these London revivals. The King's Head version with two-piano accompaniment, was recorded in February 1983, and the Fortune version with full orchestral accompaniment, in July of that year. The latter has been re-issued on CD.

The American premiere of Mr Cinders was in April 1986, at the Forum Theatre, Metuchen, New Jersey. Goodspeed Opera House revived the piece in 1988. It was also revived in 1996 by the Shaw Festival in Canada.

== Film version ==
A screen adaptation of the show was filmed in 1934 at British International Pictures at Elstree Studios with Clifford Mollison, Zelma O'Neal, Henry Mollison and the Western Brothers among the cast.

== Sources ==
- Gänzl, Kurt (1986). The British Musical Theatre (Volume 2). Macmillan Press. ISBN 978-0-19-520509-1.
- Gänzl, Kurt; Andrew Lamb (1988). Gänzl's Book of the Musical Theatre. London: The Bodley Head. OCLC 966051934.
- Gordon, Robert; Olaf Jubin (2017). The Oxford Handbook of the British Musical. London: Hodder & Stoughton. ISBN 978-0-19-998874-7.
