= For the Love of Mike (play) =

1931 play by H. F. Maltby and Clifford Grey

For the Love of Mike is a "play with music in three acts". The work was originally written as a non-musical by H. F. Maltby for the actor Tom Walls who rejected the piece when presented with the completed work. The work was then transformed by the English songwriter Clifford Grey who restructured Maltby's drama and interspersed the piece with song material with music by composers Jack Waller and Joseph Tunbridge and lyrics by Grey and Sonny Miller. It was this version of the play that finally made it to the stage; premiering in London's West End at the Saville Theatre on October 8, 1931. The cast was led by actress Peggy Cartwright in the role of "Mike" with Bobby Howes as Little Bob, Alfred Drayton as Mr. Miller, Viola Tree as Mrs. Miller, Arthur Riscoe as Paton, Syd Walker as PC Wildgoose, and Wylie Watson as the vicar. It became a hit play, running for 239 performances, and after remaining a staple/often revived work in British provincial theaters into the 1950s. The 1932 film For the Love of Mike was adapted from the play.
