= Man Power =

1927 film

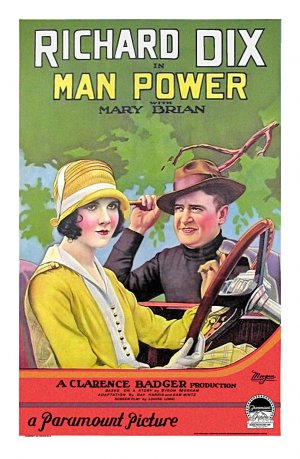
- Theatrical release poster
- Directed by: Clarence G. Badger
- Screenplay by: Ray Harris; Louise Long; George Marion Jr. Sam Mintz; Byron Morgan
- Based on: Man Power short story by Byron Morgan
- Produced by: B. P. Schulberg; Jesse L. Lasky; Adolph Zukor
- Starring: Richard Dix; Mary Brian; Philip Strange; Charles Hill Mailes; Oscar Smith; George Irving
- Cinematography: Edward Cronjager
- Production company: Famous Players–Lasky Corporation
- Distributed by: Paramount Pictures
- Release date: July 9, 1927
- Running time: 60 minutes
- Country: United States
- Language: English

Man Power is a lost 1927 American comedy silent film directed by Clarence G. Badger and written by Ray Harris, Louise Long, George Marion Jr., Sam Mintz and Byron Morgan. The film stars Richard Dix and features Mary Brian, Philip Strange, Charles Hill Mailes, Oscar Smith and George Irving. The film was released on July 9, 1927, by Paramount Pictures.

== Cast ==
- Richard Dix as Tom Roberts
- Mary Brian as Alice Stoddard
- Philip Strange as Randall Lewis
- Charles Hill Mailes as Judson Stoddard
- Oscar Smith as Ptomaine
- George Irving as James Martin
- Charles Clary as Albert Rollins
- Charles Schaeffer as Reverend Guthrie

== Production ==
The railroad scenes were filmed on the Sierra Railroad in Tuolumne County, California.
