= A Southern Maid (film) =

1933 film

- Feature on the film from Picture Show (28 April 1934)
- Directed by: Harry Hughes
- Written by: Dion Clayton Calthrop; Harry Graham; Frank Launder; Austin Melford; Frank Miller; Arthur B. Woods
- Produced by: Walter C. Mycroft
- Starring: Bebe Daniels; Clifford Mollison; Hal Gordon
- Cinematography: Claude Friese-Greene; Phil Grindrod
- Edited by: Edward B. Jarvis
- Music by: Harold Fraser-Simson
- Production company: British International Pictures
- Distributed by: Wardour Films
- Release date: October 1933
- Running time: 83 minutes
- Country: United Kingdom
- Language: English

A Southern Maid is a 1933 British musical film directed by Harry Hughes and starring Bebe Daniels, Clifford Mollison and Hal Gordon. It was written by Dion Clayton Calthrop, Harry Graham, Frank Launder, Austin Melford, Frank Miller and Arthur B. Woods based on the 1917 operetta A Southern Maid by Harold Fraser-Simson.

== Synopsis ==
Juanita, a young Spanish woman marries lowly Englishman Jack Rawden, rather than the aristocrat her father had intended, much to his displeasure.

== Cast ==
- Bebe Daniels as Juanita / Dolores
- Clifford Mollison as Jack Rawden / Willoughby
- Nancy Brown as Carola
- Hal Gordon as Pedro
- Morris Harvey as Vasco
- Lupino Lane as Antonio Lopez
- Basil Radford as Tom
- Amy Veness as Donna Rosa
- Harry Welchman as Francisco del Fuego

== Reception ==
The Daily Film Renter wrote: "Action, which is presented on stage lines, is plentifully besprinkled with tuneful songs, well rendered by star whose personality and verve are picture's best bets. Spacious sets, large crowds, quota of comedy, and liberal helpings of romance are additional assets. Cutting would improve, and help to eliminate one or two slow patches. Popular fare, with title and star pull."

Picture Show wrote: "Romance embellished with lilting music, picturesque costumes and some beautiful scenery. ... Responsibility for most of the comedy falls on the capable shoulders of Lupino Lane, while Bebe Daniels looks as lovely and sings as charmingly as ever. The Cheddar Gorge doubles most effectively for Spanish countryside."
