= Clifford Mollison =

British actor (1897–1986)

- Born: Clifford Lely Mollison; 30 March 1897; London, England
- Died: 4 June 1986 (aged 89); Cyprus
- Occupation: Actor
- Years active: 1913–1980
- Spouse(s): Muriel Agnes Pope (m. 1923; ? - 19??); Avril Wheatley (m. 1952; ? - 19??)
- Relatives: Henry Mollison (brother)

Clifford Lely Mollison (30 March 1897 – 4 June 1986) was a British stage, film and television actor. He made his stage debut in 1913. He was married to the actress Avril Wheatley. His younger brother was the actor Henry Mollison.

Mollison acted in the West End on a number of occasions. In 1921 he appeared at the Strand Theatre in Ian Hay's A Safety Match. In 1923 he was in Charles McEvoy's The Likes of Her. In 1925 he starred in the play The River by Patrick Hastings. In 1953 he appeared in Peter Ustinov's The Love of Four Colonels.

== Filmography ==
Year	Title	Role	Notes
1930	Almost a Honeymoon	Basil Dibley	
1932	The Lucky Number	Percy Gibbs	
1933	Meet My Sister	Lord Victor Wilby	
1933	A Southern Maid	Jack Rawden / Willoughby	
1934	The Luck of a Sailor	Shorty	
1934	Freedom of the Seas	Smith	
1934	Give Her a Ring	Paul Hendrick	
1934	Radio Parade of 1935	Jimmie Clare	
1934	Mister Cinders	Jim Lancaster	
1935	Royal Cavalcade	Customer	Uncredited
1939	Blind Folly	George Bunyard	
1951	Scrooge	Samuel Wilkins	
1956	The Baby and the Battleship	Salis	
1961	Mary Had a Little...	Watkins	
1963	The V.I.P.s	Mr. River, the Hotel Manager	Uncredited
1969	Oh! What a Lovely War	Heckler at Pankhurst Speech	
1972	That's Your Funeral	Witherspoon	
1973	Love Thy Neighbour	Registrar	
1974	Frankenstein and the Monster from Hell	Judge	
1980	Sherlock Holmes and Doctor Watson	Carstairs	Episode: "The Case of the Final Curtain"
