= The Love of Four Colonels =

1951 play

- Original language: English
- Written by: Peter Ustinov
- Genre: Fantasy
- Setting: Herzogenberg, Germany

Premiere
- Date: 26 March 1951
- Place: The Alexandra, Birmingham

The Love of Four Colonels is a play by the British writer Peter Ustinov, first performed in 1951. It is a fantasy set around military officers from the four Allied Occupation Powers (American, British, French and Soviet) of postwar Germany.

It premiered at The Alexandra, Birmingham before transferring to London's West End where it ran for 816 performances between 23 June 1951 and 9 May 1953, initially at Wyndham's Theatre before transferring to the Winter Garden Theare.The original West End cast included Ustinov, Moira Lister, Alan Gifford, Colin Gordon, Eugene Deckers, Theodore Bikel, Paul Hardtmuth, Patricia Jessel and Mary Hignett. Due to the length of the run, a number of replacements took the roles of original cast members including Cyril Luckham, Clifford Mollison, Ruth Trouncer.

It subsequently ran for 141 performances at the Shubert Theatre on Broadway in 1953 with a cast that included Rex Harrison and Lilli Palmer. That year it was chosen as the Best Foreign Play by the New York Drama Critics' Circle and won a Donaldson Award.

== Bibliography ==
- Wearing, J.P. The London Stage 1950-1959: A Calendar of Productions, Performers, and Personnel. Rowman & Littlefield, 2014.
