= For Heaven's Sake (1926 film) =

1926 comedy silent film by Sam Taylor

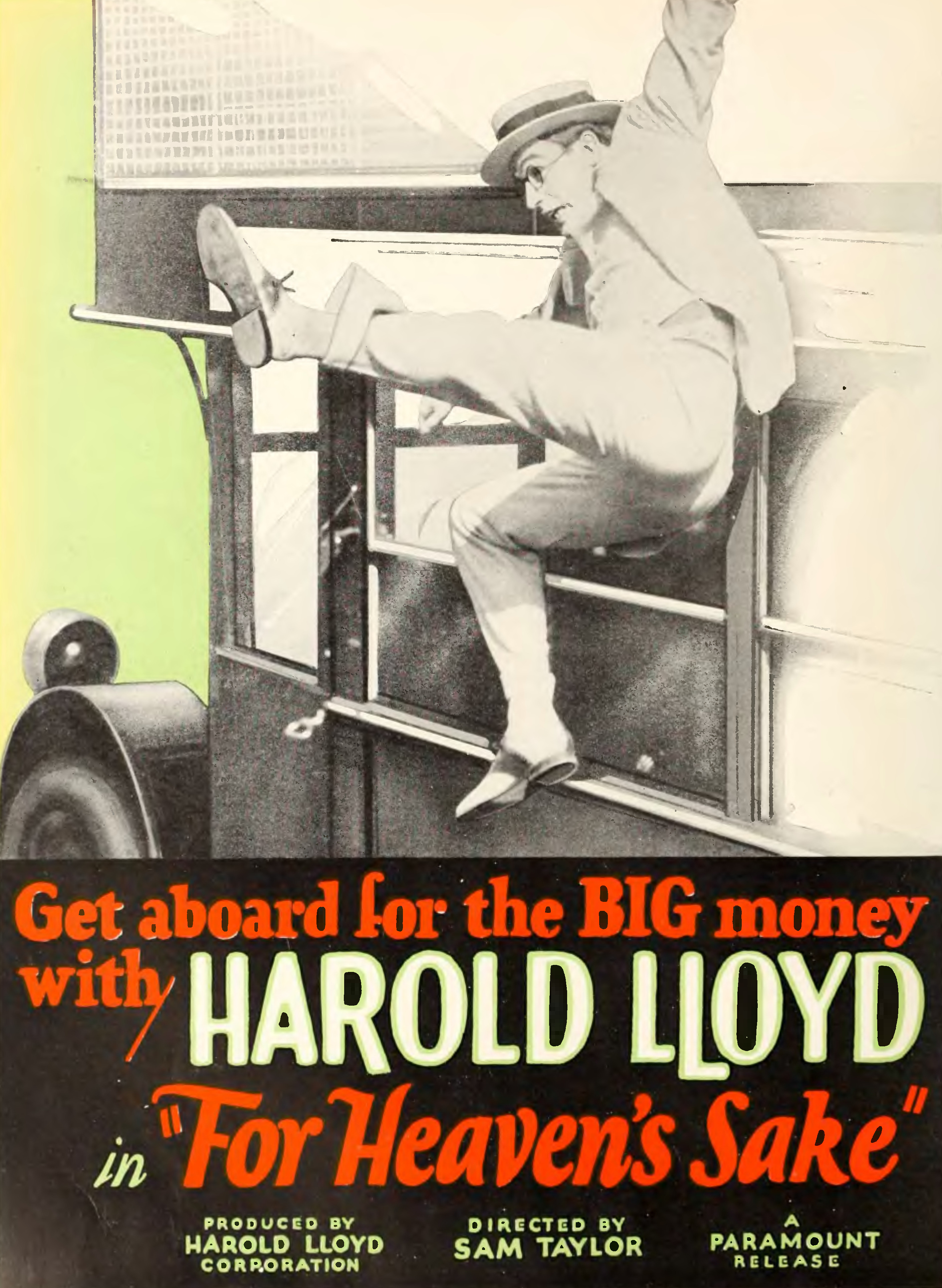
- Theatrical advertisement
- Directed by: Sam Taylor
- Written by: John Grey; Ted Wilde; Clyde Bruckman; Ralph Spence (titles)
- Produced by: Harold Lloyd
- Starring: Harold Lloyd; Jobyna Ralston
- Cinematography: Walter Lundin
- Edited by: Allen McNeil
- Distributed by: Paramount Pictures
- Release date: April 1, 1926 (U.S.)
- Running time: 60 minutes
- Country: United States
- Language: Silent (English intertitles)
- Box office: $2.6 million

For Heaven's Sake (full film)

For Heaven's Sake is a 1926 American silent comedy film directed by Sam Taylor and starring Harold Lloyd. It was one of Lloyd's most successful films and the 12th-highest-grossing film of the silent era, earning $2,600,000.

== Plot ==
Millionaire J. Harold Manners finds himself in the poor part of town. When he accidentally sets fire to a charity pushcart dispensing free coffee owned by do-gooder Brother Paul, he pulls out his checkbook to cover the damage. Brother Paul assumes that Manners wants to pay for a mission and asks him for $1,000.

After Manners reads in the newspaper that he is sponsoring a mission, he goes there to dissociate himself from it. He is aghast to find it named the J. Harold Manners Mission. When he tears down the sign, he is scolded by Brother Paul's pretty daughter Hope, who does not know who he is, but he is smitten with her. When Brother Paul returns and invites him inside to tour the place, he readily accepts. Once she learns his identity, Hope apologizes.

To boost attendance, Manners runs through town provoking people, and a crowd chases him into the mission. Some of the men are in possession of the proceeds of a jewel robbery. Before they can beat Manners, the police arrive. The quick-witted Manners takes up a "collection," the crooks deposit their loot in his hat while the police search everyone. This act earns him the gang's friendship.

Manners and the girl plan to be married at the mission. His highbrow friends decide to kidnap him, believing that they are saving him from a terrible mistake. As they drive away, one of them tells the wedding's "reception committee" that Manners is not going to marry Hope, and the disappointed committeemen get drunk. Their leader goes to Manner's club to confirm the news, then frees Manners and heads back to the mission. Manners must tend to the five drunks, but finally brings them all there and marries Hope.

== Cast ==
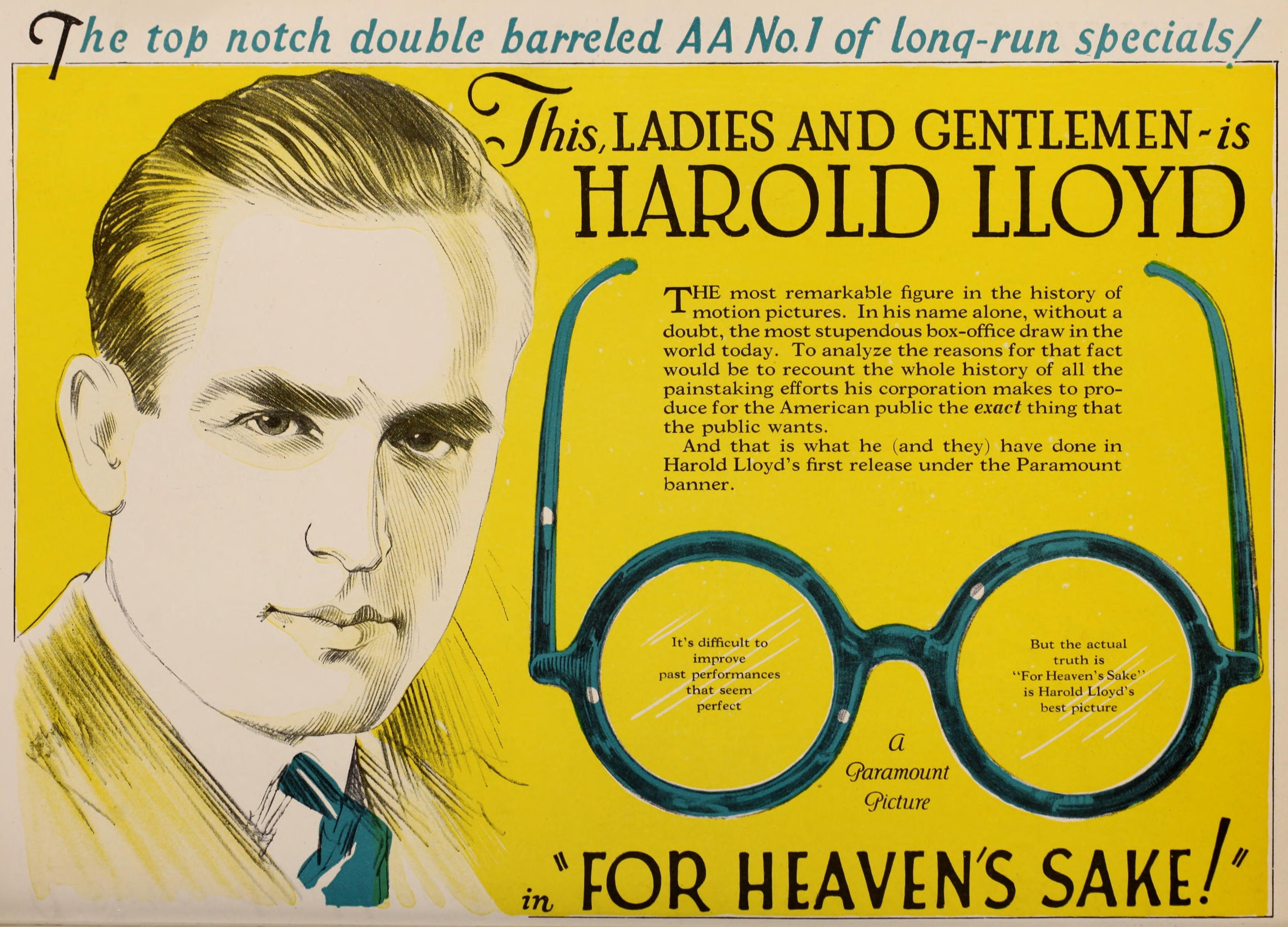
Ad in Motion Picture News, December 19, 1925.

- Harold Lloyd as The Uptown Boy
- Jobyna Ralston as The Downtown Girl
- Oscar Smith as James "Manners" Chauffeur (uncredited)
- Noah Young as The Roughneck
- Jim Mason as The Gangster (credited as James Mason)
- Paul Weigel as The Optimist
- Hal Craig as The Motorcycle Cop (uncredited)
- Robert Dudley as Harold's Secretary (uncredited)
- Richard Daniels as a Bum (uncredited)
- Francis Gaspart as a Man (uncredited)
- Jack Herrick as a Mug In Straw Hat (uncredited)
- Jackie Levine as a Little Boy (uncredited)
- Andy MacLennan as a Gangster In Mission At Collection (uncredited)
- Earl Mohan as a Bum (uncredited)
- Steve Murphy as a Tough Guy In Pool Hall (uncredited)
- Blanche Payson as a Lady On The Street (uncredited)
- Constantine Romanoff as a Mug (uncredited)
- Dick Rush as a Cop (uncredited)
- Charles Sullivan as a Boxer In Pool Hall (uncredited)
- Leo Willis as a Mug Who Gets Kicked (uncredited)

== Production ==
In the late 1920s, Lloyd alternated between making what he called "gag pictures" (such as For Heaven's Sake) and "character pictures." This was the first Lloyd film distributed by Paramount Pictures, and it was a difficult production for him and for his film company. Numerous scenes were filmed and later cut from the released version. Some of the cut elements, especially an underworld theme, were incorporated into Lloyd's 1928 film Speedy. Lloyd was disappointed in the final product and considered shelving the picture. However, it grossed over two million dollars upon release.

== See also ==
- Harold Lloyd filmography
