= To Brighton with Gladys =

1933 film

- Harry Milton and Percy the penguin in the film
- Directed by: George King
- Written by: John Quin; H.M. Raleigh; Eliot Stannard
- Produced by: Harry Cohen
- Starring: Harry Milton; Constance Shotter; Kate Cutler
- Production company: George King Productions
- Distributed by: Fox Film Company
- Release date: February 1933
- Running time: 45 minutes
- Country: United Kingdom
- Language: English

To Brighton with Gladys (also known as To Brighton with a Bird) is a 1933 British comedy film directed by George King and starring Harry Milton, Constance Shotter and Kate Cutler. It was written by John Quin, H.M. Raleigh and Eliot Stannard, and made at Ealing Studios as a quota quickie.

== Preservation status ==
The British Film Institute National Archive holds a collection of ephemera and stills but no film or video materials.

== Plot ==
Lord Bertie Penge is ordered by his wealthy uncle to collect a penguin from the docks and deliver it to a mansion in Brighton. His task arouses the suspicions of his gold-digging fiancée, Daphne, who follows him. She is horrified when Bertie arrives at the mansion accompanied by Florrie, a sympathetic cloakroom girl who has taken pity on him, and carrying a baby (actually the penguin wrapped in a shawl). Following a series of complications, Bertie breaks off his engagement with Daphne to propose to Florrie, and the penguin is safely delivered to its destination.

== Cast ==
- Harry Milton as Bertie Penge
- Constance Shotter as Florrie
- Kate Cutler as Aunt Dorothy
- Sunday Wilshin as Daphne Fitzgerald
- Melville Cooper as Slingby
- Percy as Gladys the penguin

== Reception ==
Film Weekly wrote: "A very naive British farce made amusing by the novel idea of introducing a penguin as 'the leading character.' This comical bird, which rejoices in the name of Gladys, is funnier than any of the human players, and its antics ensure quite good light entertainment."

The Daily Film Renter wrote: "Indifferently directed picture saved by Chaplinesque antics of bird who gives an excruciatingly funny inebriation interlude, and succeeds in causing havoc in a tea shop. Slender romantic development takes secondary place to Gladys. Second feature for popular patrons."
