= Oscar Smith (actor) =

American actor

- Born: October 28, 1885; Topeka, Kansas, USA
- Died: March 18, 1956 (aged 70); Los Angeles, California, USA
- Occupation: Actor
- Spouse: Nora LaVertt
- Children: 1 (Shirley Mae)

Oscar Smith (1885–1956) was an American actor who worked in Hollywood at Paramount Pictures from the 1920s through the 1940s. Like most black actors of his time, his appearances onscreen were often uncredited. He was known for his short stature, his youthful appearance (he was nicknamed "The Cute Kid"), and his stutter.

== Biography ==
Oscar was born in Topeka, Kansas, to Scott Smith and Sarah Jones. He was hired on at Paramount around 1919 as the valet and shoe-shiner of Wallace Reid; the pair met when Oscar was shining shoes in a Los Angeles barber shop. Oscar and his wife, Nora, lived with the Reids for a time while working for the couple. When Reid died, in his will, he stipulated that Oscar be given a shoe shine stand at Paramount for the rest of Oscar's life.

Oscar's shoeshine stand was located right inside the studio gates on Bronson Avenue, and it became known as a spot where one could hear major Hollywood gossip; this position led to numerous small on-screen roles in Paramount films. (His cousin was left in charge of the stand when Oscar would go to work on set.) In 1928, on the merit of his performance in The Canary Murder Case, he signed a long-term contract as an actor, a first for a black performer at Paramount.

Oscar also kept busy working as an agent for aspiring black actors. He also had a membership in the Make-Up Artists Guild; he is noted as having worked on the makeup of black actors on the set of 1943's Happy Go Lucky.

== Selected filmography ==
- Double Indemnity (1944)
- Henry Aldrich Plays Cupid (1944)
- The Good Fellows (1943)
- Henry Aldrich Gets Glamour (1943)
- Here We Go Again (1942)
- This Gun for Hire (1942)
- The Fleet's In (1942)
- Nothing But the Truth (1941)
- The Monster and the Girl (1941)
- The Way of All Flesh (1940)
- Tom Sawyer, Detective (1938)
- The Texans (1938)
- Scandal Street (1938)
- Hold 'Em Navy (1937)
- She Asked for It (1937)
- Sophie Lang Goes West (1937)
- Rhythm on the Range (1936)
- Florida Special (1936)
- The Milky Way (1936)
- Exclusive Story (1936)
- College Scandal (1935)
- So Red the Rose (1935)
- Hold 'Em Yale (1935)
- Stolen Harmony (1935)
- Mississippi (1935)
- Broadway Bill (1934)
- Ready for Love (1934)
- She Loves Me Not (1934)
- The Old Fashioned Way (1934)
- The Witching Hour (1934)
- Too Much Harmony (1933)
- Cocktail Hour (1933)
- Night of Terror (1933)
- No Man of Her Own (1932)
- Thirteen Women (1932)
- Guilty as Hell (1932)
- Madame Racketeer (1932)
- By Whose Hand? (1932)
- State's Attorney (1932)
- A Holy Terror (1931)
- Quick Millions (1931)
- Finn and Hattie (1931)
- Sheer Luck (1931)
- Let's Go Native (1930)
- Shadow of the Law (1930)
- Darkened Rooms (1929)
- Dangerous Curves (1929)
- Thunderbolt (1929)
- Close Harmony (1929)
- The Canary Murder Case (1929)
- Bitter Sweets (1928)
- Hold 'Em Yale (1928)
- Midnight Madness (1928)
- Beau Sabreur (1928)
- The Wizard (1927)
- Man Power (1927)
- The Marriage Clause (1926)
- For Heaven's Sake (1926)
- The Golden Strain (1925)
- The Freshman (1925)
