= Who Killed Doc Robin? =

1931 film

- Directed by: W.P. Kellino
- Written by: S.C. Balcon; Angus MacPhail
- Produced by: Michael Balcon
- Starring: Clifford Heatherley; Dorrie Deane; Dennis Wyndham
- Production company: Gainsborough Pictures
- Distributed by: Ideal Films
- Release date: February 1931
- Running time: 36 minutes
- Country: United Kingdom
- Language: English

Who Killed Doc Robin? is a 1931 British short comedy film directed by W.P. Kellino and starring Clifford Heatherley, Dorrie Deane and Dennis Wyndham.

It was made as a quota quickie by Gainsborough Pictures at the company's Islington Studios.

== Cast ==
- Clifford Heatherley - Luigi Scarlatti
- Dorrie Deane - Sadie Sucker
- Dennis Wyndham - Pat O'Callaghan
- Ben Welden
- Queenie Leonard
- Billy Milton

== Bibliography ==
- Chibnall, Steve. Quota Quickies: The Birth of the British 'B' Film. British Film Institute, 2007.
- Low, Rachael. Filmmaking in 1930s Britain. George Allen & Unwin, 1985.
- Wood, Linda. British Films, 1927-1939. British Film Institute, 1986.
