= Wall Street (1929 film) =

1929 film by Roy William Neill

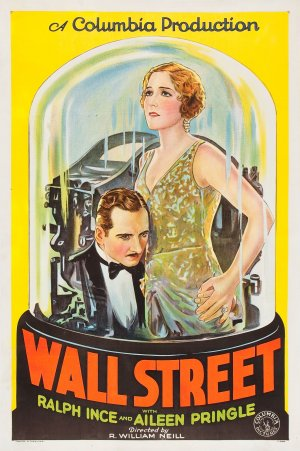
- Theatrical poster
- Directed by: Roy William Neill
- Produced by: Harry Cohn
- Starring: Ralph Ince; Aileen Pringle
- Distributed by: Columbia Pictures
- Release date: December 1, 1929
- Running time: 68 minutes
- Country: United States
- Language: English

Wall Street is an American pre-Code drama film directed by Roy William Neill and starring Ralph Ince, Aileen Pringle, Sam De Grasse, Philip Strange, and Freddie Burke Frederick. Released on December 1, 1929, it was produced by Harry Cohn.

== Plot ==
Ralph Ince is Roller McCray, a steelworker turned ruthless tycoon whose tough business methods leads a rival (Philip Strange) to commit suicide. The widow (Aileen Pringle), believing she can ruin Ince by using his own methods, conspires with her husband's former partner (Sam De Grasse), but a strong friendship between Ince and Pringle's young son (Freddie Burke Frederick) changes things dramatically.

== Cast ==
- Ralph Ince as Roller McCray
- Aileen Pringle as Ann Tabor
- Philip Strange as Walter Tabor
- Sam De Grasse as John Willard
- Ernest Hilliard as Savage
- James Finlayson as Andy
- George MacFarlane as Ed Foster
- Camille Rovelle as Miss Woods
- Grace Wallace as Bonnie Tucker
- Hugh McCormack as Jim Tucker
- Marshall Ruth as Billy
- Fred Graham as Baring
- Louise Beavers as Magnolia
- Andy Cairn as Undetermined Secondary Role (uncredited)
- Nat Carr as Undetermined Secondary Role (uncredited)

== See also ==
- 1929 in film
- List of early sound feature films (1926–1929)
