= The Eleventh Hour (1922 film) =

1922 film

- Directed by: George Ridgwell
- Written by: Leslie Howard Gordon; Ethel M. Dell(short story)
- Starring: Dennis Wyndham; Madge White; M. Gray Murray; Beatrice Chester
- Distributed by: Stoll Pictures
- Release date: 1922
- Running time: 6 reels
- Country: United Kingdom
- Language: English

The Eleventh Hour is a 1922 British silent film. One of a number of adaptations of Ethel M. Dell's romance novels made around this time, the film revolves around Doris Elliott (Madge White), who marries farmer Jeff Ironside (Dennis Wyndham), but quickly tires of farm life, and leaves him, only to realise her mistake and return just before Ironside commits suicide – hence "the eleventh hour" of the title. A print of the film is held by the British Film Institute (BFI).

== Cast ==
- Madge White as Doris Elliot
- Dennis Wyndham as Jeff Ironside
- Philip Simmons as Hugh Chesyl
- M. Gray Murray as Colonel Elliot
- Beatrice Chester as Mrs. Elliot
