= For the Love of Mike (1932 film) =

1932 film

- Directed by: Monty Banks
- Written by: H.F. Maltby (play); Clifford Grey; Frank Launder
- Produced by: Walter C. Mycroft
- Starring: Bobby Howes; Constance Shotter; Arthur Riscoe
- Cinematography: Claude Friese-Greene
- Production company: British International Pictures
- Distributed by: Wardour Films
- Release date: December 1932
- Running time: 85 minutes
- Country: United Kingdom
- Language: English

For the Love of Mike is a 1932 British musical comedy film directed by Monty Banks and starring Bobby Howes, Constance Shotter and Arthur Riscoe. It was written by Frank Launder and Clifford Grey based on the 1931 play with music For the Love of Mike by H.F. Maltby and Grey, and was made at Elstree Studios by British International Pictures with sets designed by the art director David Rawnsley.

== Plot ==
A private secretary begins to suspect that his nouveau riche employer is cheating his young female ward out of her inheritance, but inadvertently becomes involved in a plan to rob his master's safe.

== Cast ==
- Bobby Howes as Booby Seymour
- Constance Shotter as Mike
- Arthur Riscoe as Conway Paton
- Renée Macready as Stella Rees
- Jimmy Godden as Henry Miller
- Viola Tree as Emma Miller
- Wylie Watson as Rev. James
- Hal Gordon as PC
- Syd Crossley as Sullivan
- Monty Banks as chef
- Merle Oberon in a bit part

== Reception ==
Kine Weekly wrote: "Cheery extravaganza, more notable for its high spirits than its intellectual appeal, and probably all the more popular an attraction for that. There is a certain story running through, but it matters very little, compared with the general atmosphere of farce, which soon gets going at a good pace. A useful light feature."

The Daily Film Renter wrote: "Full of comic incidents, with a strong dash of romance and domestic sentiment, this film is bound to make a big popular appeal. The story is not strong, but, as so much gusto and acting ability is put into the various scenes, the plot value is not likely to be criticized. That favourite star, Ben Lyon, is here to delight his many admirers, and the general support is uniformly good."

Variety wrote: "Nothing to it, but the pace is snappy, the dialog amusing, the treatment pert and the acting rightly tuned to the farcical lead. Photography, however, took a backslide, and looked very feeble. Howes is O.K. in the leading role, clowning with enthusiasm throughout; all other members up to standard. Two singing numbers are old tunes and could reasonably be cut. Not a big film, but a straightforward entertainment for the locals. It should gross up quite well."
