= Dennis Wyndham =

South African actor (1887–1973)

- Born: 15 January 1887; Natal, South Africa
- Died: 19 August 1973 (aged 86); Worthing, Sussex, England
- Other name: Denis Wyndham
- Occupation: Actor
- Years active: 1911–1956

Dennis Wyndham (15 January 1887 – 19 August 1973) was a South African born stage and film actor. Long based in Britain, he appeared in more than 40 films between 1920 and 1956. He was born in what was then the Colony of Natal.

On 23 May 1917, he married Elsie Mackay otherwise known as silent film actress Poppy Wyndham. Her elopement caused her father James Mackay, 1st Earl of Inchcape to disinherit her. The marriage was annulled in 1922.

== Partial filmography ==
- Lorna Doone (1920)
- The Eleventh Hour (1922)
- The Informer (1929)
- Lily of Killarney (1929)
- Juno and the Paycock (1930)
- Let's Love and Laugh (1931)
- Who Killed Doc Robin? (1931)
- The Man They Couldn't Arrest (1931)
- Carmen (1931)
- The Face at the Window (1932)
- Anne One Hundred (1933)
- The Stolen Necklace (1933)
- Money Mad (1934)
- Immortal Gentleman (1935)
- Midshipman Easy (1935)
- Lonely Road (1936)
- Sensation (1936)
- You Must Get Married (1936)
- Windbag the Sailor (1936)
- Oh, Mr Porter! (1937)
- Convict 99 (1939)
- Old Mother Riley, MP (1939)
- The Arsenal Stadium Mystery (1940)
- Old Mother Riley in Society (1940)
- Sailors Don't Care (1940)
- Neutral Port (1940)
- Old Mother Riley's Ghosts (1941)
- Love on the Dole (1941)
- This England (1941)
- Sheepdog of the Hills (1941)
- The Common Touch (1941)
- The Day Will Dawn (1942)
- Schweik's New Adventures (1943)
- They Met in the Dark (1943)
- Bell-Bottom George (1943)
- I Didn't Do It (1945)
- Hungry Hill (1947)
- Dancing with Crime (1947)
- The Greed of William Hart (1948)
- Oliver Twist (1948)
- Black Jack (1950)
- The Crimson Pirate (1952)
- The Dog and the Diamonds (1953)
- The Men of Sherwood Forest (1954)
- For Better, for Worse (1954)
- Ramsbottom Rides Again (1956)
