= Arthur Riscoe =

British actor (1896–1954)

Arthur Riscoe MC
- Born: Arthur Charles Boorman; 19 November 1896; Sherburn in Elmet, West Riding of Yorkshire, England
- Died: 6 August 1954 (aged 57); London, England
- Occupation: Actor

Arthur Riscoe MC (19 November 1896 – 6 August 1954) was a British stage and film actor.

== Early life ==
He was born Arthur Charles Boorman on 19 November 1896 in Sherburn in Elmet near Leeds, but at the age of 15, he moved to Tasmania as a farm worker. When 18, he joined the Australian Imperial Forces. He served as a lieutenant during World War I and was awarded the Military Cross for his actions on the Western Front in August 1918. Later he was part of an AIF entertainment troupe.

== Career ==
His stage career began in 1919 with a part in The Lilac Domino, and he returned to the UK in 1920, slowly building popularity till the 1930s when he was well established in light comedy, and had significant film roles. In 1933, he toured the Continent "making pictures": for "For Love of You" he was in Venice and Hertfordshire's Elstree Studios; for "Going Gay", he travelled to Barcelona, Vienna and Berlin. In 1934, he appeared on stage in "Jack and Jill", playing Jack to Valerie Hay's Jill and Inga Andersen's ballet mistress. In 1936, he and Frances Day starred in the film "Public Nuisance No. 1". In 1937, he appeared in Liverpool in "Going Places" and later that year in London as the Widow Twankey at the Adelphi Theatre.

He married Olive Raymond, and their daughter Maureen Riscoe was an actress and casting director.

Riscoe continued to headline plays in the 1940s and early 1950s, among them "The Street Singer" and "Humpty Dumpty" in 1945, "Follow the Girls" in 1948, "One Wild Oat" in 1950, and "will Any Gentleman?" in 1951. His last show was "And So to Bed", which played at Cardiff, Southsea, Hull, Manchester, Glasgow, Bristol and Chiswick in the spring of 1954. He died of a heart attack on 6 August 1954 at his home in London.

== Selected filmography ==
- Horatio's Deception (1920)
- For the Love of Mike (1932)
- Going Gay (1933)
- For Love of You (1933)
- Public Nuisance No. 1 (1936)
- Paradise for Two (1938)
- Kipps (1941)
