= Deaths in November 1986 =

The following is a list of notable deaths in November 1986.

Entries for each day are listed alphabetically by surname. A typical entry lists information in the following sequence:

- Name, age, country of citizenship at birth, subsequent country of citizenship (if applicable), reason for notability, cause of death (if known), and reference.

== November 1986 ==
=== 1 ===
- Hank Ketcham, 95, American college football player (Yale).
- Ivan Larin, 60, Soviet Russian football player and coach.
- Mieczysław Moczar, 72, Polish politician, Ministry of the Interior.
- Pierre Repp, 76, French actor and comedian.
- Bernard Waldman, 73, American physicist and Enola Gay passenger, cancer.
- Sippie Wallace, 88, American blues musician.

=== 2 ===
- Ásmundur Ásgeirsson, 80, Icelandic chess player.
- W. Lester Banks, 75, American civil rights activist, kidney and heart failure.
- Bruno Betti, 75, Italian Olympic long distance runner (1936).
- Harry Brown, 69, American poet, novelist and screenwriter (A Place in the Sun), emphysema.
- Paul Frees, 66, American actor and voice actor (Rocky and Bullwinkle), pain medication overdose.
- Niels Erik Leschly, 76, Danish Olympic equestrian (1936).
- Georges Mollard, 84, French Olympic sailor (1924).
- Fred Olsen, 95, British-born American industrial chemist, inventor of ball propellant.

=== 3 ===
- Vladimir Bobri, 88, Russian Empire–born American writer and composer, house fire.
- Adolf Busemann, 85, Nazi German and American aerospace engineer, inventor of the Busemann biplane.
- Eddie "Lockjaw" Davis, 64, American saxophonist, Hodgkin lymphoma.
- E. Cuyler Hammond, 74, American biologist and biometrist, established link between smoking and lung cancer, lymph cancer.
- Sekhonyana Nehemia Maseribane, 68, Basutoland politician, prime minister.
- John Middleton, 86, American Major League Baseball player (Cleveland Indians).
- Candy Miller, 88, American NFL player.
- Bob Nelson, 66, American football player.

=== 4 ===
- Francesco Cossu, 79, Italian Olympic bronze medalist rower (1932).
- Kurt Hirsch, 80, German and English mathematician (group theory).
- John Layport, 85, American NFL player.
- Lucille Miller, 56, American convicted murderer, breast cancer.
- Abraham J. Multer, 85, American politician, member of the U.S. House of Representatives.
- Thorolf Rafto, 64, Norwegian human rights activist.
- Abdallah El-Yafi, 85, Lebanese politician, multiple-time prime minister.

=== 5 ===
- Adolf Brudes, 87, German Formula One racing driver.
- Edward Charles, 67, English-born Canadian RAF officer.
- Caesar Felton Gayles, 86, American college football and basketball coach.
- Mohammed Hassan Helmy, 74, Egyptian footballer and manager (Zamalek, Egypt).
- Claude Jutra, 56, Canadian actor and filmmaker, drowned.
- Bobby Nunn, 61, American R&B singer (The Coasters), heart attack.

=== 6 ===
- Jean Breuer, 66, Belgian cyclist.
- Elisabeth Grümmer, 75, German soprano.
- James S. Holmes, 62, American-Dutch translator of poems, AIDS.
- Gotfrid Köchert, 68, Austrian yacht racer and Olympian (1960).
- Lili Kraus, 83, Hungarian-born New Zealand and American pianist.
- Harald Sandbæk, 82, Danish theologian, member of the Danish resistance.
- Eddie Thompson, 61, English jazz pianist.
- Sant Ram Udasi, 47, Indian Punjabi poet.

=== 7 ===
- Dugald Baird, 86, British obstetrician and gynecologist.
- Norman Burrell, 86, English cricketer.
- Abdurrahim Buza, 80, Albanian painter.
- Lyndon Dadswell, 78, Australian artist.
- Paul Galdone, 79, Hungarian-born American illustrator of children's picture books, heart attack.
- Henry Gilman, 93, American organic chemist (organometallic chemistry).
- Lon Graf, 90, American college football coach (Peru State College).
- Alan Hewitt, 71, American actor (My Favorite Martian, How to Murder Your Wife), cancer.
- Audrey Erskine Lindop, 65, English writer (I Start Counting, I Thank a Fool).
- Charlie McGillivray, 74, Scottish footballer and manager.
- Baldy Northcott, 78, Canadian NHL ice hockey player (Montreal Maroons).
- Tracy Pew, 28, Australian musician (The Saints), brain haemorrhage after seizure.
- Gust Stemmler, 86, American politician, member of the Pennsylvania House of Representatives (1963-1972).

=== 8 ===
- King Clancy, 84, Canadian NHL ice hockey player (Ottawa Senators, Toronto Maple Leafs), cardiac arrest.
- Eddie del Mar, 67, Filipino actor and filmmaker.
- Franz Xaver Dorsch, 86, German civil engineer, chief engineer of the Organisation Todt.
- Beatrice Kay, 79, American actress and singer.
- Artur London, 71, Czechoslovak politician, co-defendant in the Slánský trial.
- Vyacheslav Molotov, 96, Soviet politician, Minister of Foreign Affairs.
- Ludwig Ruckdeschel, 79, Nazi German politician and war criminal, Gauleiter of Gau Bayreuth.

=== 9 ===
- Rudolf Hess, 83, American painter and sculptor.
- Guy Kingsford, 75, English-born American actor.
- Marian Matłoka, 68, Polish Olympic sprint canoeist (1948).
- Jaroslava Muchová, 77, Czech painter.
- Henry Russell, 81, American Olympic athlete (1928).

=== 10 ===
- Sukumar Bose, 74, Indian artist.
- Ludwig Hahn, 78, Nazi German SS official and convicted war criminal.
- Alan Kennington, 85-86, British novelist and playwright.
- Sydney Lee, 76, English snooker and billiards player, Pot Black referee.
- Ljubomir Magaš, 38, Yugoslav convicted rapist and Mafia crime boss, murdered.
- Gordon Richards, 82, English jockey, multiple-time British flat racing Champion Jockey, heart attack.
- Lois Roden, 70, American cult leader (Branch Davidians), breast cancer.
- Doc Sykes, 94, American baseball player.
- Vicente Trueba, 81, Spanish road racing cyclist, King of the Mountains.
- Leona Woods, 67, American nuclear physicist (Manhattan Project), stroke.

=== 11 ===
- Bea Booze, 74, American R&B and jazz singer and guitarist.
- Ángel Botello, 73, Spanish-born Puerto Rican painter and sculptor.
- Roger C. Carmel, 54, American actor (The Mothers-in-Law, Star Trek), hypertrophic cardiomyopathy.
- Jim Chalmers, 85, Australian politician, member of the New South Wales Legislative Assembly.
- David McCain, 55, American jurist and drug smuggler.
- Fred Mutch, 87, Australian rules footballer.
- Tim Walker, 68, Australian politician, member of the New South Wales Legislative Assembly (1968-1978).

=== 12 ===
- Faiz Ahmad, 39–40, Afghan politician, leader of the Afghanistan Liberation Organization, assassinated.
- Ria Baran, 64, German pair skater and Olympic gold medalist.
- Erich Koch, 90, Nazi German official and convicted war criminal.
- Bhuvaneshwar Prasad Sinha, 87, Indian jurist, Chief Justice of India.
- Rocky Stone, 68, American Major League Baseball player (Cincinnati Reds).
- Joe Strong, 84, American baseball player.
- Gustavo Thorlichen, 79–80, German-born Argentinian photographer, cancer.
- Minoru Yasui, 70, American lawyer and civil rights activist (Yasui v. United States).

=== 13 ===
- Volf Bergraser, 82, French chess master.
- Franco Cortese, 83, Italian racing driver.
- Arthur Cox, 79, English cricketer.
- Emma Fitting, 85, Swiss Olympic fencer (1924).
- Francisco Flores, 60, Mexican footballer.
- Thierry Le Luron, 34, French impressionist and humorist, AIDS.
- Rudolf Schock, 71, German tenor, heart attack.
- Amiya Tagore, 78, Indian singer.
- Dixie Upright, 60, American Major League Baseball player (St. Louis Browns).
- Gerrit van Voorst, 76, Dutch Olympic swimmer (1928).
- Les Webber, 71, American Major League Baseball player (Brooklyn Dodgers, Cleveland Indians).

=== 14 ===
- Sven Tito Achen, 64, Argentinian-born Danish writer and author on heraldry.
- Erik Byléhn, 88, Swedish Olympic silver medalist runner (1924, 1928).
- Ferdinand Daučík, 76, Slovak footballer and manager (Slavia Prague, Czechoslovakia).
- Arthur Duckworth, 85, British politician, Member of Parliament.
- Charles Harlow, 83, American Olympic javelin thrower (1928).
- Frank O'Brien, 86, Australian rules footballer.
- Iambakey Okuk, 41, Papua New Guinean politician, Deputy Prime Minister, liver cancer.

=== 15 ===
- Bidhayak Bhattacharya, 79, Indian novelist and dramatist.
- Michael Croft, 64, English actor and writer, heart attack.
- Louis François, 80, French Olympic bronze medalist Greco-Roman wrestler (1932).
- John E. Grotberg, 61, American politician, member of the U.S. House of Representatives, pneumonia and colon cancer.
- Ada Rogato, 75, Brazilian aviator.
- Alexandre Tansman, 89, Polish-French composer.
- Raymond D. Tarbuck, 89, American rear admiral.
- Richard E. Turner, 66, American flying ace.

=== 16 ===
- Panditrao Agashe, 50, Indian industrialist, managing director of Brihan Maharashtra Sugar Syndicate Ltd., heart attack.
- Åke Ericson, 73, Swedish Olympic ice hockey player (1936, 1948).
- Samuel Glasstone, 89, British-born American physical chemist and author.
- Vito Kubilus, 72, American basketball player and coach.
- Siobhán McKenna, 64, Irish actress (Saint Joan), lung cancer.
- Kurt Overhoff, 84, Austrian conductor and composer.

=== 17 ===
- Dorothy Alexander, 82, American ballot dancer.
- Richard Armitage, 58, English talent agent, heart attack.
- Georges Besse, 58, French businessman, CEO of Renault, murdered.
- Leen Buis, 79, Dutch Olympic cyclist (1928).
- Vishnu Sharan Dublish, 91, Indian politician, member of Lok Sabha.
- Harold Grad, 63, American mathematician (statistical mechanics).
- Vladimir Kenigson, 79, Soviet actor.
- Yoshio Kimura, 81, Japanese shogi player, president of the Japan Shogi Association.
- Billy McLean, 67, Scottish politician, Member of Parliament, heart failure.
- Tidye Pickett, 72, American runner and Olympian, and school principal.
- Jaime Ramírez, 46, Colombian anti-narcotics police officer, murdered.
- Peter Slobodian, 68, Canadian NHL player (New York Americans).

=== 18 ===
- Ljupčo Arsov, 76, Yugoslav politician, chairman of the executive council of the People's Republic of Macedonia.
- Lajos Bárdos, 87, Hungarian composer and conductor.
- Gia Carangi, 26, American supermodel, AIDS.
- Sophus Kahrs, 68, Norwegian Nazi official, convicted of treason and escaped.
- Marky Markowitz, 62, American jazz trumpeter.
- Valeriu Niculescu, 72, Romanian footballer.
- Stephen O. Rice, 78, American electrical engineer, pioneer in information theory and communication theory.

=== 19 ===
- Helle Crafts, 39, Danish-born American murder victim.
- Billy Dainty, 59, British comedian and pantomime artist, prostate cancer.
- Harry Goldschmidt, 76, Swiss musicologist.
- Don Jamieson, 65, Canadian politician and diplomat, Member of Parliament, heart attack.
- Roy E. Lindquist, 79, American general in the U.S. army.
- Freddie McKay, 38–39, Jamaican singer, heart attack.
- Kosta Nađ, 75, Yugoslav general.
- Klaus Nordling, 76, Finnish-born American comic book writer-artist.
- Ben Omann, 67, American politician, member of the Minnesota House of Representatives (since 1983).
- Wim Roosen, 68, Dutch footballer.
- Flukey Stokes, 48, American mobster in Chicago, murdered.

=== 20 ===
- Arne Beurling, 81, Swedish mathematician (Beurling algebra), decrypted Siemens and Halske T52.
- William Bradford Huie, 76, American author and investigative reporter, heart attack.
- Alexander Ostrowski, 93, Russian Empire–born German and Swiss mathematician (Ostrowski's theorem).

=== 21 ===
- Howard Bay, 74, American set and costume designer, heart attack.
- Lowell K. Bridwell, 62, American journalist.
- Jerry Colonna, 82, American trombonist, comedian and actor (Alice in Wonderland), kidney failure.
- Jimmy Cunliffe, 74, English footballer.
- John P. McConnell, 78, American general, Chief of Staff of the United States Air Force.
- Dar Robinson, 39, American stunt performer and actor (Stick), fall.
- Marcelino Sánchez, 28, Puerto Rican actor (The Warriors), AIDS.

=== 22 ===
- Geoffrey Agnew, 78, English art dealer.
- Alfred Bertrand, 66, Belgian footballer.
- Johnny Broadnax, 82, American football player and coach.
- Scatman Crothers, 76, American actor and musician (Chico and the Man, The Shining), lung cancer.
- Peter Dalgado, 56, Indian-born Kenyan Olympic field hockey player (1956).
- Alexander Deutsch, 86, Soviet astronomer (Pulkovo Observatory).
- Daan van Dijk, 79, Dutch Olympic gold medalist cyclist (1928).
- Dirk Janssen, 105, Dutch Olympic gymnast (1908).
- George Leslie, 79, English footballer.
- Malcolm Nokes, 89, British hammer thrower and Olympic medalist (1924).
- Dinny Pails, 65, English-born Australian tennis player and Australian Open winner.
- Cliff Taylor, 72, Australian rules footballer.

=== 23 ===
- Nathan Ausubel, 88, American historian and author.
- William Badders, 85, American naval diver, Medal of Honor recipient.
- Jean Mary Daly, 88, Australian women's rights and social justice activist.
- Charlie Gaines, 86, American trumpeter and bandleader.
- Derek Hart, 61, British radio presenter and journalist (Tonight).
- Roger Jackling, 73, British diplomat, Ambassador to West Germany (1968-1972).
- Yasuzō Masumura, 62, Japanese film director.
- Norman Maurer, 60, American comic book writer and film producer (The Three Stooges), cancer.
- Margit Söderholm, 81, Swedish writer (Sunshine Follows Rain).

=== 24 ===
- John Cranford Adams, 83, American educator and academic administrator.
- Bias Bernhoft, 84, Norwegian singer.
- Jack Coote, 79, Australian rugby league footballer.
- Hugh S. Cumming Jr., 86, American diplomat.
- Dirk Fortuin, 85, Dutch Olympic rower (1924).
- Mazzino Montinari, 58, Italian Germanistic scholar.
- Lloyd Parsons, 68, American NFL player (Detroit Lions).
- Al Smith, 84, American cartoonist (Mutt and Jeff).
- Hunt Stromberg Jr., 63, American radio and television producer (Frankenstein: The True Story), aneurysm.

=== 25 ===
- Gabdulkhay Akhatov, 59, Soviet Tatar linguist.
- Jon Bradshaw, 47–48, American journalist (Esquire), heart attack.
- Leroy S. Johnson, 98, American Mormon fundamentalist leader.
- Sir Ivan Magill, 98, Irish anesthetist.
- Don Towsley, 74, American animator (Donald Duck).

=== 26 ===
- Aleksei Baksov, 79, Soviet army general.
- Victor Bozeman, 57, American television announcer and actor.
- Lester Castle, 65, New Zealand government official.
- Betico Croes, 48, Aruban politician, founded the People's Electoral Movement, complications from a traffic collision.
- Rogelio de la Rosa, 70, Filipino politician and actor, ambassador to four countries.
- Henry Dye, 60, American mathematician.
- Edward McGuire, 54, Irish painter, heart attack.
- Randolph Prim, 90, American Negro League baseball player (Kansas City Monarchs).
- Mary Welsh Hemingway, 78, American journalist and author, widow of Ernest Hemingway.
- Kaku Takagawa, 71, Japanese Go player.
- Peter Wright, 76, Canadian army officer.

=== 27 ===
- Theodore Curphey, 89, American coroner (death of Marilyn Monroe.
- Alex Duthart, 61, Scottish drummer, heart attack.
- Gabriel Fielding, 70, English novelist.
- Zofia Gomułkowa, 84, Polish communist activist, wife of Władysław Gomułka.
- Cezar Lăzărescu, 63, Romanian architect and urban planner.
- Géza von Radványi, 79, Hungarian film director (Mädchen in Uniform).
- Charles Schlewer, 85, French Olympic rower (1920).
- Hugh Stockwell, 83, British army general, Deputy Supreme Allied Commander Europe, leukemia.
- Steve Tracy, 34, American actor (Little House on the Prairie), AIDS.

=== 28 ===
- Tuanku Bujang, 87, Malaysian politician, Governor of Sarawak.
- Maurice Côté, 69, Canadian politician.
- Archibald Currie, 98, Suriname politician, prime minister and governor-general of Suriname.
- Norman Gagne, 75, Canadian Olympic ski jumper (1936).
- Urszula Łukomska, 59, Polish Olympic gymnast (1952).
- Emilio Scanavino, 64, Italian painter and sculptor.
- Elizabeth Thomas, 79, American Egyptologist.
- A. Theodore Tuttle, 67, American Mormon leader, cancer.
- Travis Williams, 94, American NFL player.

=== 29 ===
- Gary Allen, 50, American writer and conservative activist, liver disease.
- Ronald Baddiley, 64, English actor (The Archers, The Men from the Ministry).
- Helen Fischer, 74, American politician, member of the Alaska House of Representatives.
- Cary Grant, 82, English-American actor (North by Northwest, None but the Lonely Heart, Penny Serenade), stroke.
- Louis Ichard, 85, French Olympic long-distance runner (1920).
- Herbert Rosenfeld, 76, German-born British psychoanalyst.
- Theodor Sommerschield, 62, Norwegian Olympic sailor (1968, 1972).
- Herb Vigran, 76, American actor (Gunsmoke), cancer.

=== 30 ===
- Roy Bruner, 79, American Major League Baseball player (Philadelphia Phillies).
- Martin Burgoyne, 23, British-born American artist, AIDS.
- Francisco Ciutat de Miguel, 76–77, Spanish communist and soldier.
- Darby Jones, 76, American actor (I Walked with a Zombie).
- Emil Jónsson, 84, Icelandic politician, Prime Minister of Iceland.
- Eino Leino, 95, Finnish Olympic wrestler (1920, 1924, 1928, 1932).
- Ernst Poertgen, 74, German footballer.
- Immanuel Shifidi, 57, Namibian activist, murdered.

=== Unknown date ===
- Ann Cole, 52, American R&B and gospel singer (Got My Mojo Working).
- Ray Platnick, 69, American newspaper photographer.
- Norio Suzuki, 37, Japanese explorer and adventurer, avalanche.
