= Mutch =

Mutch is a surname. Notable people with the surname include:

- Alec Mutch (1889–1960), Australian rules footballer
- Andy Mutch (born 1963), English former football player
- Charlie Mutch (1893–1974), Australian rules footballer
- Duane Mutch (1925–2019), American politician, member of the North Dakota State Senate
- Fred Mutch (1898–1986), Australian rules footballer
- George Mutch (1912–2001), Scottish football player
- Jordon Mutch (born 1991), English professional footballer
- Leslie Mutch (1897–1977), Liberal party member of the Canadian House of Commons
- Maria Mutch, Canadian writer
- Robert Mutch (born 1984), South African cricketer
- Sandy Mutch (1884–1967), Scottish football goalkeeper
- Sarah Mutch, Canadian fashion model
- Stephen Mutch, Ph.D., LL.B. (born 1956), Australian politician
- Thomas A. Mutch (1931–1980), American geologist and planetary scientist
- Thomas Mutch (1885–1958), Australian politician
- Tom Mutch (born 1967), former American ice hockey coach

== See also ==
- Much (disambiguation)
- Mutchkin
- Mutschel
