= Unseen =

Unseen or The Unseen may refer to: cannot to be seen

== Film and television ==
- The Unseen (1945 film), an American film noir directed by Lewis Allen
- The Unseen (1980 film), an American horror film directed by Danny Steinmann
- The Unseen, a film featuring Gale Harold & Michelle Clunie
- The Unseen (2016 film), a Canadian horror film directed by Geoff Redknap
- Unseen, a 2016 documentary film directed by Laura Paglin about sex offender Anthony Sowell
- The Unseen (2017 film), a British psychological thriller film directed by Gary Sinyor
- Unseen (2023 film), an American horror-thriller film directed by Yoko Okumura
- Unseen, a 2020 Belgian TV series directed by Geoffrey Enthoven
- Unseen (TV series), a 2023 South African crime drama series created by created by Travis Taute and Daryne Joshua.

== Music ==
- The Unseen (band), an American punk rock band
- Unseen (The Handsome Family album) , 2016
- Unseen (The Haunted album), 2011, or the title song
- The Unseen (album), a 2000 album by Madlib, recording as Quasimoto
- "Unseen", a song by Heaven 17
- "Unseen", a song by Your Memorial from the 2010 album Atonement

== Literature ==
- Unseen (short story collection), a 1998 short-story collection by Paul Jennings
- Unseen (Buffy/Angel novel), a 2001 trilogy by Nancy Holder and Jeff Mariotte
- The Unseen (novel), a 1990 novel by Joseph A. Citro
- The Unseen (comics), alias of Nick Fury when replacing The Watcher in Marvel Comics universe
- The Unseen, a 2004 novel by Zilpha Keatley Snyder
- The Unseen, a 1989 novel by Nanni Balestrini
- Unseen: How I Lost My Vision but Found My Voice, a memoir by Molly Burke
- Unseen, a member of the Spaceknights in the Marvel Comics universe

== Other ==
- Unseen (organization), a UK-based anti-slavery organization and charity
- al-Ghaib, hidden realities
- Unseen, a series of designs once used in the tabletop game BattleTech
- HMS Unseen
  - H.M.S. Unseen (novel), a naval thriller published in 1999 by Patrick Robinson
- Unseen (audio comic) - an audiobook

== See also ==
- Invisibility, the state of an object that cannot be seen
- Seen (disambiguation)
- Sight Unseen (disambiguation)
