= Akhatov =

Akhatov (masculine, Russian: Ахатов) or Akhatova (feminine, Russian: Ахатова) is a Russian surname. Notable people with the surname include:

- Albina Akhatova (born 1976), Russian biathlete
- Aydar Akhatov (born 1957), Russian journalist, scientist, economist and ecologist
- Danil Akhatov (born 2003), Russian footballer
- Gabdulkhay Akhatov (1927–1986), Russian Soviet linguist
