= Liya Shakirova =

Soviet Russian linguist and academic (1921–2015)

- Лия Шакирова
- Born: Liya Zakirovna Shakirova; 9 February 1921; Ufa, Republic of Bashkortostan, Russian SFSR
- Died: 29 July 2015 (aged 94); Kazan, Republic of Tatarstan, Russia
- Occupations: Linguist, professor, teacher-methodologist

Academic background
- Education: Bashkir State University

Academic work
- Discipline: Linguistics, pedagogical science
- Institutions: Kazan State Pedagogical Institute

Liya Zakirovna Shakirova (Russian: Лия Закировна Шакирова; 9 February 1921 – 29 July 2015) was a Soviet and Russian linguist, professor of pedagogical science and teacher-methodologist. She worked at Kazan State Pedagogical Institute from 1948 until her retirement in 2003 and authored approximately 420 scientific articles that included textbooks on Russian language teaching methology, teaching methods and manuals for students and teachers at universities. Shakirova received the Order of Lenin, the Medal "Veteran of Labour" and the Medal "For Valiant Labour in the Great Patriotic War 1941–1945" in her lifetime.

== Biography ==
On 9 February 1921, Shakirova was born in the Russian city of Ufa, Republic of Bashkortostan. She was the daughter of a teacher and a linguist. Shakirova graduated from high school in Ufa in 1939, and enrolled at Bashkir State University in the same year, studying at its Faculty of Russian Language and Literature. In 1944, she became the university's first graduate student in the "Methods of the Russian language in the national school" field at the Research Institute of Teaching Methods of the Academy of Pedagogical Sciences of the RSFSR under the supervision of the professor V. M. Chistyakov and the academic N. K. Dmitriev. She served in a military unit of the Red Army in 1942.

Between 1948 and her retirement in 2003, Shakirova educated at Kazan State Pedagogical Institute (KSPI). Shakirova became a doctor of Pedagogical Sciences and was appointed a professor the following year. She was the head of the university's Department of the Russian Language from 1956 to 1960; led the Tatar branch of the Research Institute of National Schools of the APS of the RSFSR to combine her scientific and pedagogical activities in the Department of the Russian Language and led the KSPI's Russian Language Department from 1965 to 1990. Shakirova was a member of the editorial board of the Russian Language in the National School journal from 1962 to 1972, was on the Council of Mektebe between 1965 and 1990, chair of the Kazan Zonal Association of Russian Language Departments of Pedagogical Institutes from 1965 to 1985 and was a member of the Scientific and Methodological Council on the Russian language under the Ministry of Education USSR between 1967 and 1987. She was also Chair of the Scientific and Methodological Council for National Pedagogical Schools of the RSFSR (Philological Sciences) from 1978 to 1982 and a member of multiple specialized councils for dissertation defense.

Shakirova was the author of approximately 420 scientific articles which included textbooks on the methodology of teaching Russian in a Turkic school and in schools across Russia, teaching methods as well as manuals for students and teachers at universities. She established the scientific Kazan Linguo-Methodological School that has gained students from the Tatarstan, parts of Russia and the Commonwealth of Independent States. Shakirova educated 19 candidates and three pedagogical science doctors when she headed the postgraduate studies in the Theory and Methods of Education and Education (Russian) field from 1975. She was elected a full member of the Academy of Pedagogical and Social Sciences of the Russian Federation in 1996 and was made an honorary member of the Petrovsky Academy of Sciences and Arts in Saint Petersburg in 2010. Shakirova died on 29 July 2015 in Kazan following a long illness. She was buried at Kazan's Novotatarsky Cemetery.

== Awards ==
In 1971, Shakirova was awarded the Order of Lenin, and was made an Honored Scientist of the RSFSR on 23 April 1981. She was also made an Honored Teacher of the Republic of Tatarstan in 1968 and an Honored Scientist of the TASSR in 1976. Shakirova additionally received the Medal "Veteran of Labour" in 1984; the Medal of Krupskaya in 1988; the Medal "For Valiant Labour in the Great Patriotic War 1941–1945" in 1994; the Honorary Diploma of the Ministry of General and Vocational Education HA in 1996; an Honorary Diploma of the State; the Committee of the Russian Federation on Higher Education in 2001; the Medal "For Merit in Education of the Republic of Tatarstan" in 2001; the Medal "For Valiant Labor" (Tatarstan) in 2006 and the "Honorary Professor of TSHPU" honour in 2010.
