= Muchmore =

Much More or Muchmore may refer to:

- Much More (album), a 1990 album by Carola Häggkvist
- "Much More", a number from the 1960 musical The Fantasticks
- "Much More", a song by Whigfield from the 2000 album Whigfield III
- "Much More", a song by De La Soul first released on the 2003 "Shoomp/Much More" single
- MuchMore, a Canadian TV channel later known as M3
- Marie Muchmore (1909–1990), U.S. witness to the assassination of JFK
- Muchmore Valley, a valley in Antarctica
- Robert Muchmore, Australian former professional rugby league footballer

== See also ==
- Much (disambiguation)
- More (disambiguation)
