= 1927 Georgia Bulldogs football team =

American college football season

1927 Georgia Bulldogs football

National champion (Berryman, Boand, Poling)
- Conference: Southern Conference
- Record: 9–1 (6–1 SoCon)
- Head coach: George Cecil Woodruff (5th season)
- Offensive scheme: Notre Dame Box
- Captain: Ivey Shiver
- Home stadium: Sanford Field

Uniform
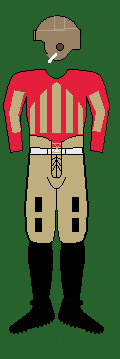

1927 Southern Conference football standings
	Conf.					Overall
Team	W		L		T	W		L		T
Georgia Tech +	7	–	0	–	1	8	–	1	–	1
Tennessee +	5	–	0	–	1	8	–	0	–	1
NC State +	4	–	0	–	0	9	–	1	–	0
Vanderbilt	5	–	0	–	2	8	–	1	–	2
No. 8 Georgia	6	–	1	–	0	9	–	1	–	0
Florida	5	–	2	–	0	7	–	3	–	0
Ole Miss	3	–	2	–	0	5	–	3	–	1
Virginia	4	–	4	–	0	5	–	4	–	0
Clemson	2	–	2	–	0	5	–	3	–	1
Alabama	3	–	4	–	1	5	–	4	–	1
LSU	2	–	3	–	1	4	–	4	–	1
Mississippi A&M	2	–	3	–	0	5	–	3	–	0
Washington and Lee	2	–	3	–	0	4	–	4	–	1
VPI	2	–	3	–	0	5	–	4	–	0
Maryland	3	–	5	–	0	4	–	7	–	0
South Carolina	2	–	4	–	0	4	–	5	–	0
VMI	2	–	4	–	0	6	–	4	–	0
Tulane	2	–	5	–	1	2	–	5	–	1
North Carolina	2	–	5	–	0	4	–	6	–	0
Sewanee	1	–	4	–	0	2	–	6	–	0
Kentucky	1	–	5	–	0	3	–	6	–	1
Auburn	0	–	6	–	1	0	–	7	–	2
+ – Conference co-champions; Rankings from Dickinson System

The 1927 Georgia Bulldogs football team represented the University of Georgia in the sport of American football during the 1927 Southern Conference football season. This was the last season George Cecil Woodruff served as the head coach of the football team and the team's 34th season of college football. The Bulldogs posted a 9–1 record, and were retroactively selected as the 1927 national champion under the Berryman QPRS, Boand, and Poling systems. The team was ranked No. 8 in the nation in the Dickinson System ratings released in December 1927.

Called the "dream and wonder team", the Bulldogs were ranked No. 1 in the US with one regular season game remaining, but were upset in the mud by in-state rival Georgia Tech (the next season's national champion). Georgia did not win the Southern Conference (SoCon) championship in 1927 as a result of its loss to Georgia Tech at season's end. Georgia Tech (7–0–1 SoCon), Tennessee (5–0–1 SoCon), and NC State (4–0–0 SoCon) all finished undefeated in conference play.

The season featured Georgia's first-ever win against Yale as well as six shutouts. The win over Yale propelled Georgia to the national spotlight. The team was anchored by two All-American ends, captain Chick Shiver and consensus All-American Tom Nash.

== Schedule ==
Date	Opponent	Site	Result	Attendance	Source
October 1	Virginia^{†}	Sanford Field; Athens, GA	W 32–0		
October 8	at Yale*	Yale Bowl; New Haven, CT	W 14–10	18,000	
October 15	Furman*	Sanford Field; Athens, GA	W 32–0		
October 22	vs. Auburn	Memorial Stadium; Columbus, GA (rivalry)	W 33–0		
October 29	at Tulane	Tulane Stadium; New Orleans, LA	W 31–0	10,000	
November 5	at Florida	Barrs Field; Jacksonville, FL (rivalry)	W 28–0	16,000	
November 12	Clemson	Sanford Field; Athens, GA (rivalry)	W 32–0		
November 19	Mercer*	Sanford Field; Athens, GA	W 26–7		
November 24	at Alabama	Legion Field; Birmingham, AL (rivalry)	W 20–7	25,000	
December 3	at Georgia Tech	Grant Field; Atlanta, GA (rivalry)	L 0–12	38,000	
*Non-conference game; ^{†}Homecoming

== Before the season ==
At the end of the previous season, one source described Georgia as "probably the hardest hit team in the Southern Conference, losing 14 letter men with the Thanksgiving game."

=== Woodruff resignation ===
Coach Woodruff said he would quit after this season. Former Notre Dame back Jim Crowley and Notre Dame lineman Harry Mehre assisted Woodruff with his Notre Dame Box scheme.

== Game summaries ==
=== Week 1: Virginia ===
To open the season, Herdis McCrary averaged a touchdown a quarter and the Bulldogs romped over the Virginia Cavaliers 32–0.

The starting lineup was: Nash (left end), Morris (left tackle), Jacobson (left guard), Boland (center), Smith (right guard), Stelling (right tackle), Shiver (right end), Broadnax (quarterback), Estes (left halfback), McTigue (right halfback), McCrary (fullback)

=== Week 2: at Yale ===
Week 2: Georgia at Yale

Team	1	2	3	4	Total
• Georgia	7	7	0	0	14
Yale	7	3	0	0	10

- Date: October 8
- Location: Yale Bowl
  New Haven, Connecticut
- Game attendance: 18,000
- Referee: Dexter Very

In the second week of play, Georgia defeated Yale by the score of 14–10, the school's first win over an Eastern power. Georgia was propelled into the national spotlight. Bobby Hooks threw a 59-yard touchdown pass to Frank Dudley.

The starting lineup was: Nash (left end), Stelling (left tackle), Smith (left guard), Boland (center), Jacobson (right guard), Morris (right tackle), Shiver (right end), Broadnax (quarterback), Estes (left halfback), McTigue (right halfback), McCrary (fullback)

=== Week 3: Furman ===
Week 3: Furman at Georgia

Team	1	2	3	4	Total
Furman	0	0	0	0	0
• Georgia	13	6	6	7	32

- Date: October 15
- Location: Sanford Field
  Athens, Georgia
- Referee: Springer (Penn)

Georgia defeated the Furman Purple Hurricane 32–0, giving the Purple Hurricane its only loss this season. Furman twice was within Georgia's 5-yard line.

However, Georgia's backs also ran well. Frank Dudley had a 55-yard run for a score shortly after the start of the second quarter, and Roy Estes placed the ball in scoring position in the third with a 52-yard run.

The starting lineup was: Nash (left end), Morris (left tackle), Haley (left guard), Boland (center), Jacobson (right guard), Paitz (right tackle), Shiver (right end), Broadnax (quarterback), Estes (left halfback), McTigue (right halfback), McCrary (fullback).

=== Week 4: Auburn ===
Week 4: Auburn at Georgia

Team	1	2	3	4	Total
Auburn	0	0	0	0	0
• Georgia	0	26	0	7	33

- Date: October 22
- Location: Columbus, Georgia

In the fourth week of play, Georgia beat Auburn 33–0. Four touchdowns were scored in the second period, when coach Woodruff sent in his first-string backfield. A long pass from Hooks to McCrary got one touchdown.

The starting lineup was: Nash (left end), Morris (left tackle), Haley (left guard), Boland (center), Jacobson (right guard), Lautzenheizer (right tackle), Shiver (right end), Broadnax (quarterback), Estes (left halfback), Hooks (right halfback), McCrary (fullback).

=== Week 5: at Tulane ===
The Bulldogs traveled to New Orleans and beat Tulane 31–0. McCrary was kept on the bench as the halfbacks provided most of the scoring.

=== Week 6: at Florida ===
Week 6: Florida vs. Georgia

Team	1	2	3	4	Total
Florida	0	0	0	0	0
• Georgia	0	7	14	7	28

- Date: November 5, 1927
- Location: Barrs Field
  Jacksonville, Florida
- Game attendance: 16,000

Georgia beat the Florida Gators 28–0 after leading just 7–0 at the half. Florida quarterback Goof Bowyer broke his leg. The starting lineup was: Nash (left end), Morris (left tackle), Jacobson (left guard), Boland (center), Smith (right guard), Lautzenheizer (right tackle), Shiver (right end), Broadnax (quarterback), Estes (left halfback), McTigue (right halfback), Rothstein (fullback).

=== Week 7: Clemson ===
Week 7: Clemson at Georgia

Team	1	2	3	4	Total
Clemson	0	0	0	0	0
• Georgia	13	13	0	6	32

- Date: November 12
- Location: Athens, Georgia

McCrary scored three of the five touchdowns in the 32–0 victory over Clemson.

McTigue ran in the first score. Roy Estes threw a 51-yard touchdown pass to H. F. Johnston. McCrary replaced Rothstein and added two touchdowns. The second team went in the second half, in which McCrary added another touchdown.

The starting lineup was: Nash (left end), Morris (left tackle), Jacobson (left guard), Boland (center), Haley (right guard), Lautenheizer (right tackle), Shiver (right end), Broadnax (quarterback), Estes (left halfback), McTigue (right halfback), Rothstein (fullback).

=== Week 8: Mercer ===
Week 8: Mercer at Georgia

Team	1	2	3	4	Total
Mercer	0	7	0	0	7
• Georgia	7	6	0	13	26

- Date: November 19, 1927
- Location: Athens, Georgia

Georgia started the Mercer game with its second string and won 26–7. One report before the game reads: "Mercer's football team has about as much chance of beating Georgia as The Cluster has of having compulsory chapel abolished."

Mercer's Phoney Smith was the first southern player to cross the goal line against Georgia, on an 80-yard punt return.

=== Week 9: at Alabama ===
Week 9: Georgia at Alabama

Team	1	2	3	4	Total
• Georgia	7	7	6	0	20
Alabama	0	0	0	7	7

- Date: November 24
- Location: Athens, Georgia
- Game attendance: 25,000

The game on November 24 against the Alabama Crimson Tide was the first game played in the newly completed Legion Field. The 20–7 Bulldog victory snapped a five-game losing streak against Alabama. (Note: Alabama's loss to Georgia Tech prior in the season snapped their own 24-game unbeaten streak.)

Estes passed to Nash for the first score, and Estes ran the second score in himself. Another pass to Nash got a touchdown in the third quarter. In the final period, Alabama's Brasfield went back to pass, but saw no one open, and took off running. In the game's most sensational play, he dodged three tacklers behind the line, and evaded three more on his way to the endzone.

The starting lineup was: Nash (left end), Morris (left tackle), C. Smith (left guard), Boland (center), Jacobson (right guard), Lautenheizer (right tackle), Shiver (right end), Johnson (quarterback), McTigue (left halfback), Estes (right halfback), Hill (fullback).

=== Week 10: at Georgia Tech ===
Week 10: Georgia at Georgia Tech

Team	1	2	3	4	Total
Georgia	0	0	0	0	0
• Ga. Tech	0	6	6	0	12

- Date: December 3
- Location: Grant Field
  Atlanta
- Game attendance: 38,000
- Referee: Gardner (Cornell)

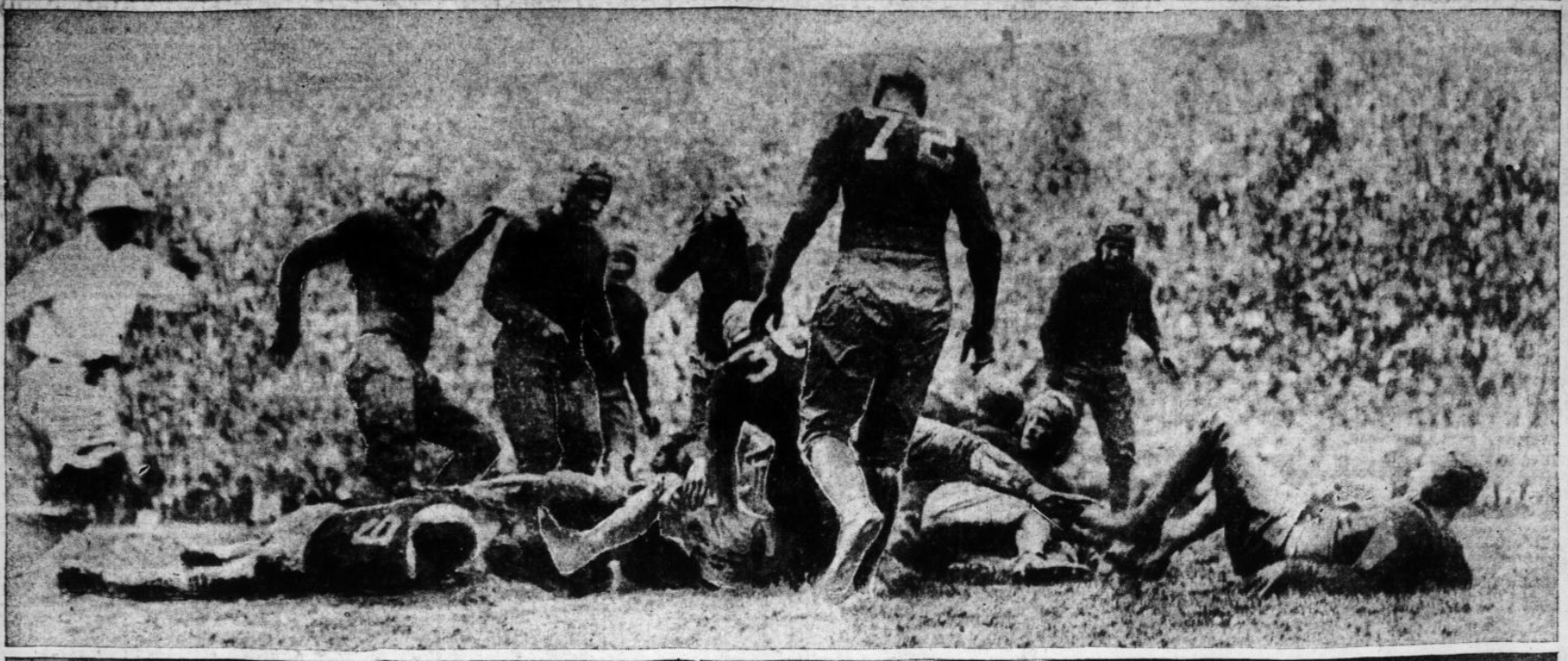
Scene from the Georgia Tech game

Georgia was ranked number 1 by the Dickinson system. Grant Field was expected to be filled to capacity, the largest crowd ever in the south. One account read "And never in the history of athletics in the Southland has there been an occasion so momentous as this. The football championship of the South and as some may justifiably figure, the nation, will be decided on Saturday in the capital city and native sons will decide it."

In the rain, the Bulldogs were defeated by rival Georgia Tech for the SoCon championship 12–0. For the first time this year, neither Nash nor Shiver played particularly well.

Tech's first touchdown came on a pass from Warner Mizell to quarterback Bob Durant. The second one came shortly after Stumpy Thomason returned an interception 57 yards to Georgia's 22-yard line. Thomason scored on a 13-yard end run.

The starting lineup was: Nash (left end), Morris (left tackle), Jacobson (left guard), Boland (center), Smith (right guard), Lautenheizer (right tackle), Shiver (right end), Johnson (quarterback), Estes (left halfback), Dudley (right halfback), McCrary (fullback).

== After the season ==
=== Legacy ===
By season's end, both Georgia and Yale were national champions according to various selectors. Despite the loss to Tech, the Bulldogs were retroactively selected as the 1927 national champion under the Boand, Poling, and Berryman QPRS systems. Walter Eckersall noted the progress of southern football as he reflected on Georgia's victory over Yale; "Old Eli, with its running attack, could do nothing against Georgia, which is represented by two of the finest ends in the country. Nash and Shiver would be valuable assets on any football team."

== Personnel ==
=== Staff ===
- Head coach: Kid Woodruff
- Managers: Keith Lewis, James M. Roberts

=== Line ===
Number	Player	Position	Games started	Hometown	Prep school	Height	Weight	Age
18	Ike Boland	Center	8				175	
33	Theodore Frisbie	Tackle						
32	Eugene S. Haley	Guard						
17	J. Hill	Guard						
16	Roy H. Jacobson	Guard	8					
1	Glenn Lautzenhiser	Tackle	5		Tech High			
25	J. Robert Morris	Tackle	8					
19	Tom Nash	End	8	Washington, Georgia		6'3"	205	
27	Henry G. Palmer	End						
26	Chick Shiver	End	8	Sylvester, Georgia		6'1"	190	
10	Gene Smith	Guard	5	Montgomery, Alabama		5'9"	190	
23	H. Cree Stelling	Tackle						

=== Backfield ===
Number	Player	Position	Games started	Hometown	Prep school	Height	Weight	Age
8	Johnny Broadnax	Quarterback			University School for Boys			
7	Cook	Halfback						
9	Frank Dudley	Halfback						
3	Roy Estes	Halfback						
28	Harvey Hill	Fullback						
29	Bobby Hooks	Halfback						
30	H. F. Johnson	Quarterback						
12	Herdis McCrary	Fullback		Bicknell, Indiana		6'0"	200	
4	Robert McTigue	Halfback						
24	Tommy Paris	Quarterback						
6	Bennie Rothstein	Fullback						

=== Unlisted ===
Number	Player
2	Davidson
5	Cox
11	Buchanan
13	Bradley
14	Martin
15	Nixon
20	Collins
21	Sanford
22	Stewart
31	Greenfield
34	Reigle
38	Eubanks

=== Depth chart ===
The following chart provides a visual depiction of Georgia's lineup during the 1927 season with games started at the position reflected in parentheses. The chart mimics a Notre Dame Box on offense.

LE
Tom Nash (8)
Henry G. Palmer (0)

LT	LG	C	RG	RT
J. Robert Morris (7)	Roy Jacobson (4)	Ike Boland (8)	Roy Jacobson (4)	Glenn Lautzenhiser (5)
H. Cree Stelling (1)	Gene Haley (2)		Gene Smith (3)	J. Robert Morris (1)
Theodore Frisbie (0)	Gene Smith (2)		Gene Haley (1)	Paitz (1)
	J. Hill (0)		J. Hill (0)	H. Cree Stelling (1)

RE
Chick Shiver (8)
Henry G. Palmer (0)

QB
Johnny Broadnax (6)
H. F. Johnson (2)
Tommy Paris (0)

RHB
Robert McTigue (5)
Frank Dudley (1)
Roy Estes (1)
Bobby Hooks (1)

LHB
Roy Estes (7)
Robert McTigue (1)
Cook (0)

FB
Herdis McCrary (5)
Bennie Rothstein (2)
Harvey Hill (1)

== See also ==
- 1927 College Football All-America Team
- 1927 College Football All-Southern Team
