= I Start Counting (novel) =

1966 novel

- First edition
- Author: Audrey Erskine Lindop
- Language: English
- Genre: Thriller
- Publisher: Collins (UK); Doubleday (US)
- Publication date: 1966
- Publication place: United Kingdom
- Media type: Print

I Start Counting is a 1966 thriller novel by the British writer Audrey Erskine Lindop. With a serial strangler on the loose in her small English town, a teenage girl begins to suspect who it is.

In 1970 it was adapted into a film of the same title directed by David Greene and starring Jenny Agutter and Simon Ward. Others have been I Thank a Fool, and The Singer Not the Song.

== Bibliography ==
- Goble, Alan. The Complete Index to Literary Sources in Film. Walter de Gruyter, 1999.
- Vinson, James. Twentieth-Century Romance and Gothic Writers. Macmillan, 1982.
