= Nicola (novel) =

1959 novel by Audrey Erskine Lindop

- 1964 UK edition
- Author: Audrey Erskine Lindop
- Language: English
- Genre: Drama
- Publisher: Collins (UK); Doubleday (US)
- Publication date: 1959
- Publication place: United Kingdom
- Media type: Print

Nicola is a 1959 novel by the British writer Audrey Erskine Lindop. An attractive young woman returns to her home village after a term in prison, and discovers how much she is resented by some of the inhabitants.

== Bibliography ==
- Vinson, James. Twentieth-Century Romance and Gothic Writers. Macmillan, 1982.
