= Ike Boland =

American football player (born c. 1908)

No. 18; 45; 43
- Position: Center

Personal information
- Born: c. 1908
- Listed weight: 175 lb (79 kg)

Career information
- College: Georgia (1927–1929)

Awards and highlights
- National championship (1927); All-Southern (1927)

Joseph H. "Ike" Boland was a college football player.

== University of Georgia ==
Boland was a prominent center for the Georgia Bulldogs of the University of Georgia from 1927 to 1929. An All-Time Georgia All-Star Team published in 1935 had Boland as the second team center behind Bum Day.

=== 1927 ===
He played center for the 1927 "dream and wonder team" which defeated Yale at the Yale Bowl on October 8. He was selected All-Southern by Miss Emily Boyd, sports editor of the Griffin Daily News, the only woman sports editor in the south.

=== 1929 ===
Boland was captain of the 1929 team. Georgia again defeated Yale, this time at home in Yale's first game played in the south. He was the first center to receive honorable mention on the Associated Press All-Southern team, placing behind Lloyd Roberts of Tulane and Julian Bealle of South Carolina of the first and second teams.
