= George Cecil Woodruff =

American football player and coach (1888–1968)

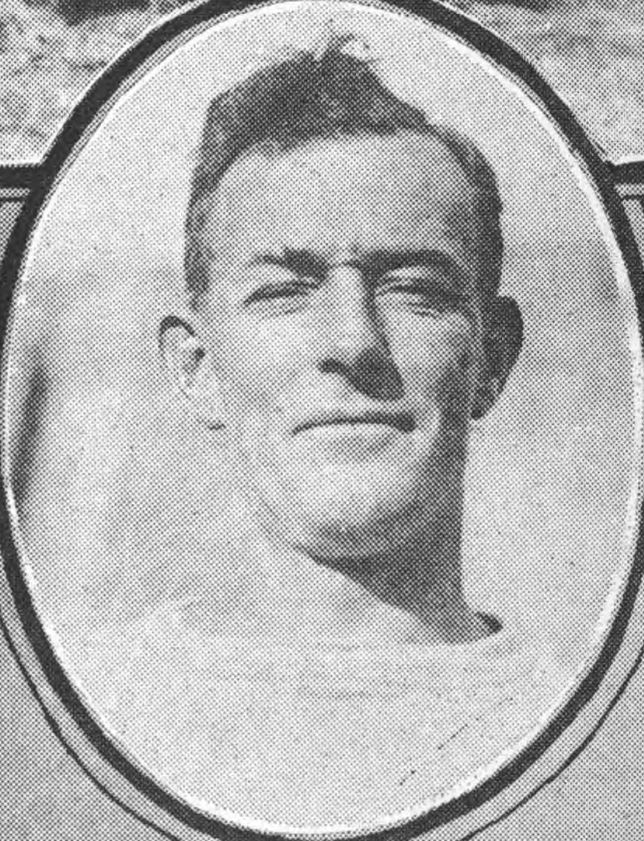
- Woodruff in 1925

Biographical details
- Born: November 29, 1888; Columbus, Georgia, U.S.
- Died: November 16, 1968 (aged 79); Columbus, Georgia, U.S.

Playing career
- 1907–1908: Georgia
- 1910–1911: Georgia
- Position: Quarterback

Coaching career (HC unless noted)
- 1923–1927: Georgia

Head coaching record
- Overall: 30–16–1

George Cecil "Kid" Woodruff Sr. (November 29, 1888 – November 16, 1968) was an American businessman and college football player and coach. He served as the head football coach at the University of Georgia from 1923 to 1927, compiling a record of 30–16–1.

== Early life and education ==
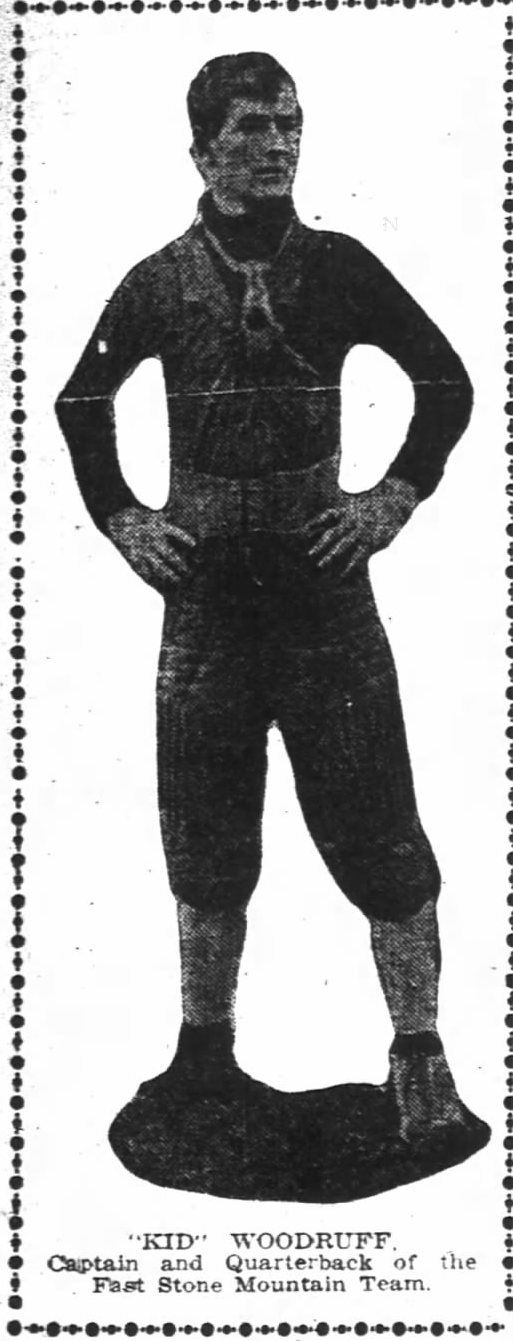
Woodruff at University School.

Born in Columbus, Georgia in 1889, Woodruff attended Columbus High School and the University School for Boys in Stone Mountain, Georgia before enrolling at the University of Georgia in Athens in 1907. He played quarterback for the Georgia Bulldogs football team during the 1907 and 1908 seasons before taking a year off from school to travel around the United States and Mexico. After returning to the university and rejoining the football team in 1910 and 1911, when he was team captain, Woodruff graduated with a Bachelor of Arts degree in 1912. He was nominated though not selected for an Associated Press All-Time Southeast 1869-1919 era team.

== Professional and coaching career ==
Following graduation, Woodruff became an insurance salesman in Columbus. He served in World War I as a major in the 82nd Infantry ("All-American") Division of the United States Army. He was Kirk Newell's backup on the 1917 Camp Gordon football team. He then returned to his successful insurance business after the war.

After the 1922 season, Georgia football head coach Herman Stegeman moved to the position of athletic director, and Woodruff was hired as the new head coach at a salary of $1 a year. Woodruff was the third former Georgia player to become the Bulldogs' head coach, preceded by Ernest Brown and Marvin D. Dickinson.

Woodruff brought to Athens the Notre Dame offensive scheme as well as assistant coaches Frank Thomas and Harry Mehre, who were Knute Rockne's disciples. Jim Crowley, who was one of the Four Horsemen at Notre Dame, was also an assistant coach under Woodruff at Georgia. Woodruff compiled a record of 30–16–1 over five seasons, including his 1927 "Dream and Wonder team's" upset of Yale.

After the 1927 season, Woodruff stepped down to focus on his insurance business. Georgia governor Richard Russell, Jr. appointed Woodruff as an initial member of the University System of Georgia Board of Regents in 1932, where Woodruff would serve until 1945. His son reported that Woodruff would call Dwight D. Eisenhower, cursing at him, telling him to get Georgia players out of the Army.

== Legacy ==
Woodruff Hall, the former basketball arena at the University of Georgia, was named in honor of Woodruff and his older brother, Harry "Big Kid" Woodruff, who also attended Georgia and played quarterback. Woodruff Hall stood on the site of the current Henry W. Grady College of Journalism and Mass Communication. Georgia's current outdoor football practice field is also named in honor of George Woodruff.

Woodruff was instrumental in arranging for the annual Auburn–Georgia football game to be played in Columbus for many years.

== Head coaching record ==
| Year | Team | Overall | Conference | Standing | Bowl/playoffs |
|---|---|---|---|---|---|
Georgia Bulldogs (Southern Conference) (1923–1927)
| 1923 | Georgia | 5–3–1 | 4–2 | 5th | |
| 1924 | Georgia | 7–3 | 5–1 | T–2nd | |
| 1925 | Georgia | 4–5 | 2–4 | 14th | |
| 1926 | Georgia | 5–4 | 4–2 | T–4th | |
| 1927 | Georgia | 9–1 | 6–1 | 5th | |
| Georgia: | | 30–16–1 | 21–10 | | |
| Total: | | 30–16–1 | | | |

== Sources ==
- History of the University of Georgia, Thomas Walter Reed, Imprint: Athens, Georgia : University of Georgia, ca.1949, pp.3543-3561
- Reed, Thomas Walter (c. 1949). "Athletics at the University from the Beginning Through 1947". History of the University of Georgia. dlg.galileo.usg.edu. pp. 3543–3561.
- New Georgia Encyclopedia entry for George Woodruff
