= Staroye Aymanovo =

Rural locality in Aqtanış District, Tatarstan

Coordinates: 55°30′36″N 53°31′38″E

Staroye Aymanovo (Russian: Старое Айманово; Tatar: Иске Айман, romanized: İske Ayman) is a rural locality (a selo) in Aktanyshsky District of the Republic of Tatarstan, Russia, located in the lower reaches of the Belaya River, near the border with the Republic of Bashkortostan. Its population is mostly ethnic Tatars.

== Notable people ==
Gabdulkhay Akhatov (1927–1986), a Soviet Tatar linguist and an organizer of science, was born in Staroye Aymanovo.
