= The Tall Headlines (novel) =

1950 novel

- First edition (US)
- Author: Audrey Erskine Lindop
- Language: English
- Genre: Thriller
- Publisher: Heinemann (UK); Macmillan (US)
- Publication date: 1950
- Publication place: United Kingdom
- Media type: Print

The Tall Headlines is a 1950 thriller novel by the British writer Audrey Erskine Lindop. A middle-class British family are lest devastated and divided when the eldest son is arrested and hanged for murder.

In 1952 it was adapted into a film of the same title directed by Terence Young and starring Mai Zetterling.

== Bibliography ==
- Goble, Alan. The Complete Index to Literary Sources in Film. Walter de Gruyter, 1999.
- Vinson, James. Twentieth-Century Romance and Gothic Writers. Macmillan, 1982.
