= The Singer Not the Song (novel) =

1953 novel

- First edition
- Author: Audrey Erskine Lindop
- Language: English
- Genre: Drama
- Publisher: Heinemann (Britain); Pocket Books (US)
- Publication date: 1953
- Publication place: United Kingdom
- Media type: Print

The Singer Not the Song is a 1953 novel by the British writer Audrey Erskine Lindop. It was published in the United States by Pocket Books under the alternative title of The Bandit and the Priest. A priest sent to a small Mexican town engages in a moral battle with a local bandit.

It was adapted into a 1961 film The Singer Not the Song directed by Roy Ward Baker and starring Dirk Bogarde, John Mills and Mylène Demongeot.
