= Journey Into Stone =

1972 novel

- First edition
- Author: Audrey Erskine Lindop
- Language: English
- Genre: Thriller
- Publisher: Macmillan (Britain); Doubleday (US)
- Publication date: 1972
- Publication place: United Kingdom
- Media type: Print

Journey Into Stone is a 1972 thriller novel by the British writer Audrey Erskine Lindop. Peace in the sleepy little village of Parkley is shattered by a burglary, followed by a series of crimes of increasing intensity. Critics gave it positive reviews.

== Bibliography ==
- Vinson, James. Twentieth-Century Romance and Gothic Writers. Macmillan, 1982.
