= Tom Nash (American football) =

American football player (1905–1972)

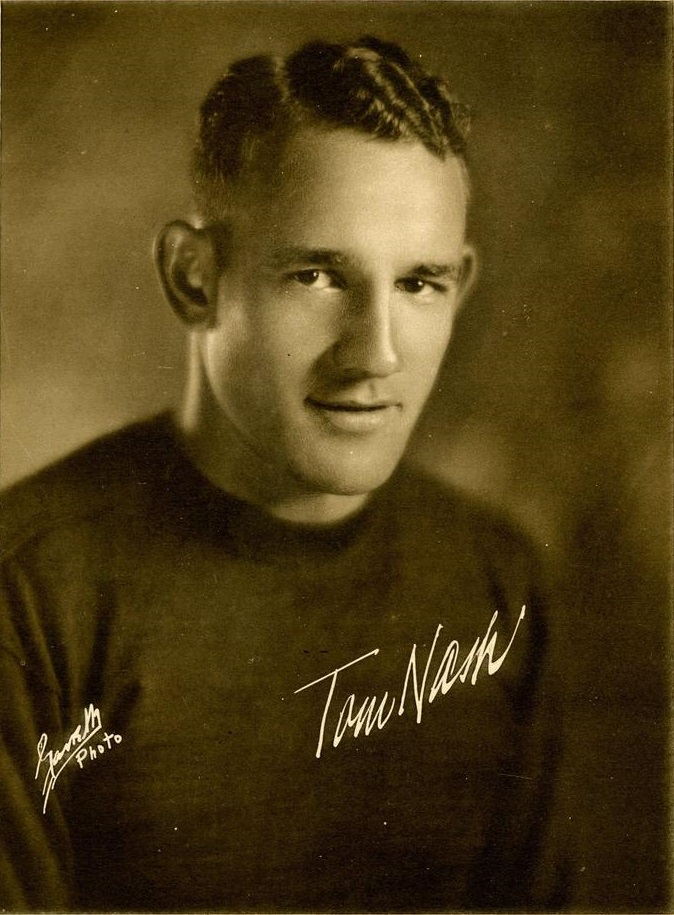

No. 21, 19, 37, 35, 17
- Position: End

Personal information
- Born: November 21, 1905; Lincoln County, Georgia, U.S.
- Died: August 24, 1972 (aged 66); Washington, Georgia, U.S.
- Listed height: 6 ft 3 in (1.91 m)
- Listed weight: 208 lb (94 kg)

Career information
- College: Georgia

Career history
- Green Bay Packers (1928–1932); Brooklyn Dodgers (1933–1934)

Awards and highlights
- Consensus All-American (1927); All Southern Conference Team (1927); All-Pro Green Bay Packers (1932); University of Georgia All-Time Team (1934); State of Georgia Sports Hall of Fame (1972); Washington-Wilkes Sports Hall of Fame, Inaugural Induction (1987)
- Stats at Pro Football Reference

Thomas Acton Nash, Sr. (November 21, 1905 – August 24, 1972) was an American football end for the Green Bay Packers and Brooklyn Dodgers of the National Football League (NFL) from 1928 to 1934.

== Early life ==
Tom Nash, Sr. was born in Lincoln County, Georgia and grew up in Washington, Georgia.

== College career ==
Nash played college football on the 1925, 1926, and 1927 University of Georgia football teams, including the 1927 "Dream and Wonder" team. He was a consensus All-American in 1927.

== Professional football ==
He then played professional football in the National Football League (NFL), first for the Green Bay Packers, including the World Championship teams of 1929, 1930, and 1931. He was named All-Pro while at Green Bay in 1932. He finished his professional career with the Brooklyn Dodgers.

== Baseball ==
He also played Double A and Triple A baseball.

== Later life ==
After completing his professional career, he returned to his hometown of Washington, Georgia, where he was an automobile dealer and later elementary school principal and coach, mentoring many young men in that community. From 1943 to 1945, he was an assistant football coach at the University of Georgia under Coach Wally Butts. He was named to the 1934 University of Georgia All-Time team. He was also inducted into the state of Georgia Sports Hall of Fame in 1972 and the Washington-Wilkes Sports Hall of Fame in its inaugural induction in 1987. His son, Thomas Nash Jr. followed in his father's footsteps and played football as an offensive tackle for the University of Georgia from 1968-1971. "Little Tom" was an Academic All-American and named to the All-SEC Team during his time at Georgia.
