= I Start Counting =

1970 drama thriller film directed by David Greene

- Theatrical Release Poster
- Directed by: David Greene
- Screenplay by: Richard Harris
- Based on: I Start Counting by Audrey Erskine Lindop
- Produced by: David Greene; Stanley R. Jaffe
- Starring: Jenny Agutter; Bryan Marshall; Simon Ward
- Cinematography: Alex Thomson
- Edited by: Keith Palmer
- Music by: Basil Kirchin
- Production company: Triumvirate Films
- Distributed by: United Artists
- Release date: 5 November 1970 (United Kingdom)
- Running time: 105 minutes
- Countries: United Kingdom; United States
- Language: English

I Start Counting is a 1970 coming-of-age drama thriller film directed by David Greene and starring Jenny Agutter and Bryan Marshall. It was written by Richard Harris. The film's plot follows a teenage girl who comes to suspect that her adult stepbrother is a serial killer. It was based on the 1966 novel of the same name by Audrey Erskine Lindop.

The film was moderately controversial because of Agutter's squeaky-clean image and youth (16, playing a 14-year-old), when coupled with the film's sexual content, including a title sequence in which the camera lingers over Agutter as she gets dressed.

== Plot ==
Wynne Kinch, an adopted 14-year-old girl, has a crush on her 32-year-old stepbrother, George. While spying on George in the bathroom, Wynne notices he has several scratches on his back, and finds a jumper she made for him thrown in the rubbish, with blood on it; this leads her to suspect him of being the serial killer of several local teenage girls, who is still at large. Despite this belief, Wynne continues to have romantic sexual fantasies about George, and dreams of marrying him when she comes of legal age.

Throughout the film, she regularly visits the house she previously lived in with her adoptive family.

Later on, Wynne searches the back of George's van, hoping to find clues but is forced to stay inside and hide when he gets in and drives off. He drives to a house and Wynne discovers that he is having an affair with a mentally unstable woman, whose blood was on the discarded jumper after she had slashed her wrists in a suicide attempt.

Wynne's best friend Corinne teases her about her crush on George and when the family goes out on a picnic, Corinne flirts with him; he gets angry at her for acting like a "pathetic little mini-tart" and pins her down roughly on the ground. Corinne runs off and later phones Wynne to tell her she will stay out all night with an unnamed boy who, she says, they both know. Wynne, worried about her friend, goes searching for her at her former home and finds Corinne's dead body. About to leave the house she is confronted and trapped inside by the bus conductor who Wynne and Corinne often meet on the bus. He confesses to having killed the girls. Wynne tries to escape. He chases her and she falls into the pond. While helping her out he breaks down in distress, at which point the police arrive.

The film ends with Wynne and George watching their old house being demolished.

== Cast ==
- Jenny Agutter as Wynne
- Bryan Marshall as George
- Clare Sutcliffe as Corinne
- Simon Ward as conductor
- Gregory Phillips as Len
- Lana Morris as Leonie
- Billy Russell as granddad
- Madge Ryan as mother
- Michael Feast as Jim
- Fay Compton as Mrs. Bennett
- Lally Bowers as Aunt Rene
- Charles Lloyd-Pack as priest at school
- Lewis Fiander as priest at church
- Gordon Richardson as tramp
- Phil Collins as ice cream vendor

== Production ==
I Start Counting was an international co-production between England's Triumvirate Films and the United States-based distributor United Artists.

=== Filming ===
The film was shot at Bray Studios in Berkshire and on location around Bracknell. The sets were designed by the art director Brian Eatwell.

=== Music ===
The theme song "I Start Counting", was sung by Lindsey Moore. The film's soundtrack by Basil Kirchin was released in 2008 (Trunk Records, JBH068LP).

== Release ==
I Start Counting was released theatrically in London on 5 November 1970. The film was met with some controversy in the United Kingdom as it was promoted as a serial killer sex murder film involving teenage girls.

== Reception ==
The Monthly Film Bulletin wrote:

It would be a remarkable feat of balancing that could support all the disparate elements of David Greene's third film without occasional signs of strain. Greene overcomes most of the difficulties with some sensitive performances and an artfully smooth style that stitches together the psychological thriller, the whodunnit trail of hints and red herrings, and the fantasies and memories of Wynne's Catholic girlhood into a coherent and accomplished piece of film-making. The style in fact so often seems to be leading the material (as in The Shuttered Room [1967]) that it occasionally forces it into simplification or overemphasis. The demolition and reconstruction work within the town that is the physical background for Wynne's acting out of her juvenile fears is extended at the end into an over-neat symbol for their solution: hand in hand, Wynne and George watch the bulldozers finally reach the boundaries of the old, ghostly family property and reduce the place to rubble. But for the most part, the rawness of the setting is not simply a symbol but an alive and active presence, the precarious, half-completed air of the place perfectly expressed in the muddy chaos of building sites adjoining the glitteringly modern church where Wynne goes to confess some of her problems. Jenny Agutter's performance as Wynne is itself something of a remarkable balance, poised between naiveté and delicacy to suggest a perfectly natural innocent.

The Radio Times Guide to Films gave the film 2/5 stars, writing: "Director David Greene taxes the patience with this manipulative whodunnit. There are so many dead ends in this adaptation that it soon becomes a matter of indifference whether Bryan Marshall is responsible for the series of sex attacks near his home. Much more intriguing, however, is the effect the slayings have on his foster sister, Jenny Agutter, whose hero worship is both disturbing and potentially deadly."

Leslie Halliwell said: "Strained psychological suspenser with good moments between the longeurs."
