= Sight Unseen =

Sight Unseen may refer to:

== Stage and screen ==
- Sight Unseen (TV series), a Canadian crime drama television series
- Sight Unseen (play), a 1991 play by Donald Margulies

=== TV episodes ===
- "Sight Unseen" (Charmed), a 2000 episode of the television series Charmed
- "Sight Unseen" (Stargate SG-1), a 2002 season 6 episode of the television series Stargate SG-1

== Music, radio, audio ==
- "Sight Unseen", a song by Died Pretty from the 1990 album Every Brilliant Eye
- "Sight Unseen", a song by Rise Against from the 2008 album Appeal to Reason
- Sight Unseen (audio drama), an audio drama on the Wondery podcast network

== Literature ==
- Sight Unseen (novel), a 1969 novel by Audrey Erskine Lindop
- Sight Unseen, a 2005 novel by Robert Goddard (novelist)
- Sight Unseen, a 1999 book by Georgina Kleege
