= The Way to the Lantern =

1961 novel

- Author: Audrey Erskine Lindop
- Language: English
- Genre: Historical
- Publisher: Collins (Britain); Doubleday (US)
- Publication date: 1961
- Publication place: United Kingdom
- Media type: Print

The Way to the Lantern is a 1961 historical novel by the British writer Audrey Erskine Lindop. An English actor and confidence trickster rises to prominence during the era of the French Revolution.

== Bibliography ==
- Vinson, James. Twentieth-Century Romance and Gothic Writers. Macmillan, 1982.
