= The Tall Headlines =

- Original British trade ad
- Directed by: Terence Young
- Screenplay by: Audrey Erskine Lindop; Dudley Leslie
- Based on: The Tall Headlines by Audrey Erskine Lindop
- Produced by: Raymond Stross
- Starring: Mai Zetterling; Michael Denison; Flora Robson; Dennis Price; André Morell; Jane Hylton; Naunton Wayne; Mervyn Johns; Celia Lipton
- Cinematography: C.M. Pennington-Richards
- Edited by: Vera Campbell
- Music by: Hans May
- Production company: Raymond Stross Productions
- Distributed by: Grand National Pictures
- Release date: 15 April 1952 (London)
- Running time: 100 minutes
- Country: United Kingdom
- Language: English

The Tall Headlines (U.S. title: The Frightened Bride) is a 1952 British drama film directed by Terence Young and starring André Morell, Flora Robson, Michael Denison, Peter Burton, Sid James and Dennis Price. It was written by Audrey Erskine Lindop and Dudley Leslie, based on the 1950 novel by the same name by Lindop.

== Plot ==
The middle-class Rackham family suffer agonies when their eldest son Ronnie is hanged for murder.

== Cast ==
- Mai Zetterling as Doris Richardson
- Michael Denison as Phillip Rackham
- Flora Robson as Mary Rackham
- Dennis Price as Maurice Fletcher
- André Morell as George Rackham
- Jane Hylton as Frankie Rackham
- Naunton Wayne as Police Inspector
- Mervyn Johns as Uncle Ted
- Celia Lipton as Sandra
- Hugh Dempster as Police Inspector
- Michael Ward as Dentist
- Olive Sloane as Mrs. Baker
- Barbara Blair as Nancy Richardson
- Peter Burton as Graham Moore
- Joan Hickson as Waitress
- Sid James as Mr. Spencer

== Production ==
It was shot at Walton Studios outside London.

== Critical reception ==
The Monthly Film Bulletin wrote: "From the manner of its casting and presentation, it is difficult to be sure of the precise social territory in which this film is supposed to be set. Occasional hints of Cockney trouble the otherwise impeccable West End accents of Flora Robson and André Morell; Michael Denison is unflinchingly O.U.D.S. in manner and inflection; Jane Hylton, on the other hand, is unmistakably not. An odd household: and indeed a somewhat oppressive one. ... While evidencing no awareness of the unreality of the whole affair, Terence Young's direction puts it on the screen with a slickness that may perhaps be considered a tiny mercy."

Kine Weekly wrote: "Despite its gloomy fundamentals and uneven outline, the film has plenty of versatile surface action."

Leslie Halliwell wrote "Glum, boring, badly cast, badly written and generally inept melodrama."

In British Sound Films: The Studio Years 1928–1959 David Quinlan rated the film as "mediocre", writing: "A 'picture of misery', not helped by the assortment of accents within its 'suburban' family."

TV Guide wrote, "Decent performances by some well-known British actors and actresses are wasted on this unbelievable story."

Allmovie called it a "grim British drama," writing: "an excellent all-character-actor cast includes Flora Robson and André Morrell as the grieving parents, Michael Denison as the brother and Mai Zetterling as the initial murder victim."
