= Soldiers' Daughters Never Cry =

1948 novel

- First edition
- Author: Audrey Erskine Lindop
- Language: English
- Genre: Drama
- Publisher: Heinemann (UK); Simon & Schuster (US)
- Publication date: 1948
- Publication place: United Kingdom
- Media type: Print

Soldiers' Daughters Never Cry is a 1948 novel by the British writer Audrey Erskine Lindop, her second to be published.

== Bibliography ==
- Vinson, James. Twentieth-Century Romance and Gothic Writers. Macmillan, 1982.
