= The Singer Not the Song =

1961 British film by Roy Ward Baker

- Directed by: Roy Ward Baker
- Screenplay by: Nigel Balchin
- Based on: The Singer Not the Song by Audrey Erskine Lindop
- Produced by: Roy Ward Baker
- Starring: Dirk Bogarde; John Mills; Mylène Demongeot
- Cinematography: Otto Heller
- Edited by: Roger Cherrill
- Music by: Philip Green
- Production company: Rank Organisation
- Distributed by: Rank Film Distributors
- Release date: 5 January 1961
- Running time: 132 minutes
- Country: United Kingdom
- Language: English
- Budget: £350,000

The Singer Not the Song is a 1961 British Western film directed by Roy Ward Baker and starring Dirk Bogarde, John Mills, and Mylène Demongeot. It was written by Nigel Balchin based on the 1953 novel of the same title by Audrey Erskine Lindop.

The film became a notorious flop for the Rank Organisation. Bogarde called the film "a travesty of what it should have been" while Roy Baker said "I hated it, it broke my heart. It put me completely out of kilter for years afterwards, it was a disaster. I’m told it’s a cult picture and quite probably in countries with large Catholic communities it has some special reference. I should never have made it." "That was one that went wrong," said John Mills.

The film failed at the box office, but has since developed a cult following due to its camp homosexual context and over-the-top performance by Bogarde in black leather trousers.

== Plot ==
A priest, Father Michael Keogh, is sent by Rome to Quantana, a remote Mexican town which is under the control of a ruthless bandit, Anacleto Comachi. Anacleto is educated and intelligent, and is "down" on the Church, but he finds in Keogh a man he strangely admires and with whom he can have intelligent conversation. However, he does not allow this to distract him from his goal: to expunge the priest from his fiefdom at any cost.

== Main cast ==
- Dirk Bogarde as Anacleto Comachi
- John Mills as Father Michael Keogh
- Mylène Demongeot as Locha de Cortinez
- Laurence Naismith as Old Uncle
- John Bentley as Police Captain
- Leslie French as Father Gomez
- Eric Pohlmann as Presidente
- Nyall Florenz as Vito
- Roger Delgado as Pedro de Cortinez
- Philip Gilbert as Phil Brown
- Selma Vaz Dias as Chela
- Laurence Payne as Pablo
- Eileen Way as cigar-smoking woman
- Lee Montague as taxi-driver

== Production ==
=== Development ===
Leo Genn bought the film rights to the novel in 1954 with a view to starring in it as the bandit. Film rights were then bought by Robert Bassier in 1955 who announced Alan Scott was writing the screenplay.

Then the rights were acquired by the Rank Organisation. That company was very impressed with the job director Ken Annakin did on Across the Bridge and signed a two picture deal with Annakin, of which the first was to be an adaptation of The Singer Not the Song. John Stafford would produce. In 1957 Annakin said "This is really a tremendous subject. I aim to make it more uncompromising and stark than Across the Bridge. It has good intellectual content yet the background is almost pure Western.”

Annakin wrote a script with Guy Elmes and claimed he wanted to cast Marlon Brando and Peter Finch in the leads. However he was unable to get in touch with Brando, so John Davis, the head of Rank, suggested Annakin instead use Dirk Bogarde, who was under contract to the studio. Annakin felt Bogarde would be miscast. Stafford suggested that he and Annakin make the second film under the two-picture contract with Rank - which became Nor the Moon by Night - to give them time to secure the services of Brando.

In October 1958 Rank declared it had decided to postpone filming of the movie, along with two other projects that had been announced Precious Bane (which would never be made) and The 39 Steps (made not long afterwards).

According to Annakin, John Davis was unhappy that the director went over budget on Nor the Moon by Night, and reneged on his promise to let Annakin make The Singer Not the Song. Instead the movie was offered to director Roy Ward Baker, who was under contract to Rank. Baker said, "I can’t think why they [Rank] wanted the damned thing. It wasn’t a good book, it was the old phoney story of a little girl falling in love with a priest and it’s been done so many times." He claimed he tried to get out of the film by suggesting Luis Buñuel as director but was unsuccessful. Eventually, Baker claimed, Rank forced him to make the movie, with Dirk Bogarde in the lead. Nigel Balchin was hired to write the script.

At one stage Richard Burton was announced for the role of the priest. This part ended up going to John Mills. According to Baker, when this happened Dirk Bogarde reportedly became so incensed that he told Baker, "I promise you, if Johnny plays the priest I will make life unbearable for everyone concerned". Bogarde later said "It was such a terrible script and they put John Mills in as the priest when it should have been someone like Paul Newman, as he was in those days."

However, according to John Mills, the film was meant to star Mills and Marlon Brando, "and I was thrilled because he was one of my favorite actors. Unfortunately he walked away, and Dirk Bogarde replaced him at the last minute. He of course was rather miscast as the tough, leather-clad baddie." Mills also said Bogarde "wasn’t happy with the film, nor was Roy. You couldn’t have two more different people than Bogarde and Brando, chalk and cheese."

According to Mylène Demongeot the film was at one stage meant to star Charlton Heston. She declared in a 2016 filmed interview in Paris:

"I was then shooting Upstairs and Downstairs at Shepperton Studios, the producers came by to offer me the part. I accepted immediately. I was later told that Charlton Heston had agreed upon doing it, his name was even in my contract. But when we arrived back in London to shoot, we've been told "Mr Heston no longer wants to do the film because the film shocks him", it might have been for other reasons... I was told Montgomery Clift would eventually do it, then that Marlon Brando was in talks to do it, I was therefore excited. But I saw coming up a charming little man [John Mills], probably 1.60 m high man, kind, in his fifties with lovely blue eyes. But I said, is he really the man my character is supposed to be crazy about? The man whom Dirk Bogarde should be crazy [French: folle pour, tongue-in-cheek term to imply 'go gay for'] about? Uh sorry ... [Laughs]. I was about to quit but my agent told me "you'll do it anyways", so I grumbled the whole time. I struggled to project in emotional scenes with him the fact that I adored him. It proves that I am a good actress [Laughs]. He was a very good actor but I understand me, I was 23 at the time and he was an old man to me. The film remains as one of the first homosexual stories seen on screen."

=== Shooting ===
Even though the story takes place in Mexico, the film was actually made in Alhaurín de la Torre, in Andalusia, Spain. Filming started 18 April 1960 in Spain and finished at Pinewood Studios in London by July.

Roy Ward Baker later said, "Dirk came to me and he said, as he thought he was going to be the villain, he should be all in black, which is reasonable enough" and he had the trousers made in Rome. Baker claimed in one of his earlier films Hardy Kruger wore black leather trousers and "I didn’t know that black leather trousers were supposed to be kinky, or in some strange sexual way. I didn’t occur to me. Alright, so I’m naive, a BF[bloody fool], you can say what you like, but there’s no need to be so downright rude about the picture."

Bogarde said "I should have been in blue jeans and a beat-up old jacket, driving an old Chevy, and there I was in black leather and riding a white horse — I did the whole thing for camp and nobody had any idea what was happening! "

Roy Baker recalls after John Davis came to see the film, "he took me by the arm and he said “well, I don’t quite know what you’ve done, but it’s beautiful and it is, it’s very pretty."

== Reception ==
The film was given a Royal Premiere in January 1961, Josh Billings of Kinematograph Weekly reported " I found the film fascinating, despite its faults, which include the casting of Dirk Bogarde as a ruthless bandit, and what about its title and star values? It would be exceedingly rash hastily to write off The Singer Not The Song."

=== Box office ===
In February 1961 Billings wrote in Kinematograph Weekly, "I must confess I rather doubted whether the film had universal appeal, but by all accounts both high and low-brows are going for it." Another piece in the same publication said, "Despite the fact that it co-starred Dirk Bogarde and John Mills, the film was not an ¢asy one to sum up, but from the word ‘go' Fred Thomas set about selling it with a song in his heart. His optimism was justified."

The following month Kinematograph Weekly said the film was "making quite an impact, particularly on good and better-class box-offices, and is not only a safe, but a highly profitable bet." However The Singer Not the Song did not ultimately make the end of year list in Kinematograph Weekly for British box office successes in 1961.

Baker claimed the film was very popular in France, Italy and Spain. He had a percentage of the profits and said the film eventually made its money back after 23 years.

=== Critical ===
The Monthly Film Bulletin wrote: "A Dirk Bogarde picture is rarely a guarantee of a work of art, yet has come to promise, certainly of late, a film of definite morbid interest. Though The Singer Not the Song misses the strongly individual flavour of, say, The Sleeping Tiger (it has been directed disappointingly by Roy Baker when the story cried out for Joseph Losey), it is nevertheless a strangely compelling film. This is mainly due to the presence of Bogarde himself, intelligent, quietly sardonic, his restraint (apart from an over-indulged left eyebrow) verging on the hieratic, his hints of inner angoisse (the killing of Old Uncle, for instance) boyishly appealing yet at the same time oddly reminiscent of Joan Fontaine in Ivy, his wardrobe (60 per cent black leather) a fetishist's dream, his aptness for a part requiring Marlon Brando approximately nil. Faced with this central anomaly on the one hand, and a script which flirts, less confidently than Mr. Bogarde, with religion and two kinds of unholy love on the other, Roy Baker has settled faint-heartedly for a cool, correct but unadventurous style of direction, with sun-bleached photography (Otto Heller), brooding, cricket-chirping night scenes and some patches of ripely ambiguous dialogue to keep one's doubt as to Anacleto's motives in a state of continually muddied ferment. Apart from John Mills, who alone is professional enough to seem aware of the incongruities of his surroundings and his script without ever once betraying the fact, the acting is pretty absurd: even so, this is a rewarding film, as startling as a muffled scream from the subconscious."

Variety wrote "As a dialectic discussion hinged on the Roman Catholic religion, this can only be accepted as flippant. As a romantic drama, it must be agreed that is it glossy, but over-contrived. Yet, somehow, the thesping of the two principals... prevents the screen version of Audrey Erskine Lindrop’s novel from falling between these two spacious schools. In fact, the overall effect is compelling."

Kinematograph Weekly called the film "outstanding," adding: "The picture's opposite leading characters rub each other the wrong – and the right – way and angry and divine sparks fly as the friction is intensified. Dirk Bogarde lacks stature at the start, but gains height as the story unfolds as Anacleto, John Mills, none too sure of his Irish brogue, also steadily expands his role and wins considerable sympathy towards the finish as Father Keogh, Mylene Demongeot registers as the guileless and tantalising Locha and Laurence Naismith contributes a powerful cameo as the drunken, trigger-happy Old Uncle. The rest are more than adequate. There is some slack during the first half, although Anacleto and his henchmen are free with their guns, but momentum increases as soon as it becomes apparent that Locha loves Father Keogh and that he, a victim of self deception, responds. The revelation sublimates and humanises the drama and paves the way to an honours even, if sad, ending. Its flawlessly composed exteriors underline the highlights, and the camera work is masterly."

Filmink declared it "rivals Ferry to Hong Kong as the most bizarre Rank in-house movie. It was not only an in-house production, but one with all the trimmings – a big budget, based on a popular novel, an international adventure tale, location filming overseas (Spain), big stars (Bogarde, Mills), foreign starlet (Mylène Demongeot), and distinguished director (Roy Ward Baker)... The result is a weird camp concoction with a leather-clad Bogarde making eyes at John Mills at his most sexless. Everyone blamed the casting for the movie’s failure, and that didn’t help, but the other departments don’t shower themselves in glory.... This was the last of the big Rank international adventure movies – at least until The Long Duel several years later."

Baker later declared, "I didn’t want to do the picture... I stuck about for about fifteen months not to make it, but I got myself into such a predicament that I was obliged to make it. I went into it with a good heart, made the best of it, gave it everything that I could and in the end, was successful. But not for me. These notices broke my heart. Looking back to 1960... it broke my nerve."
