= Sukumar Bose =

Indian artist (1912–1986)

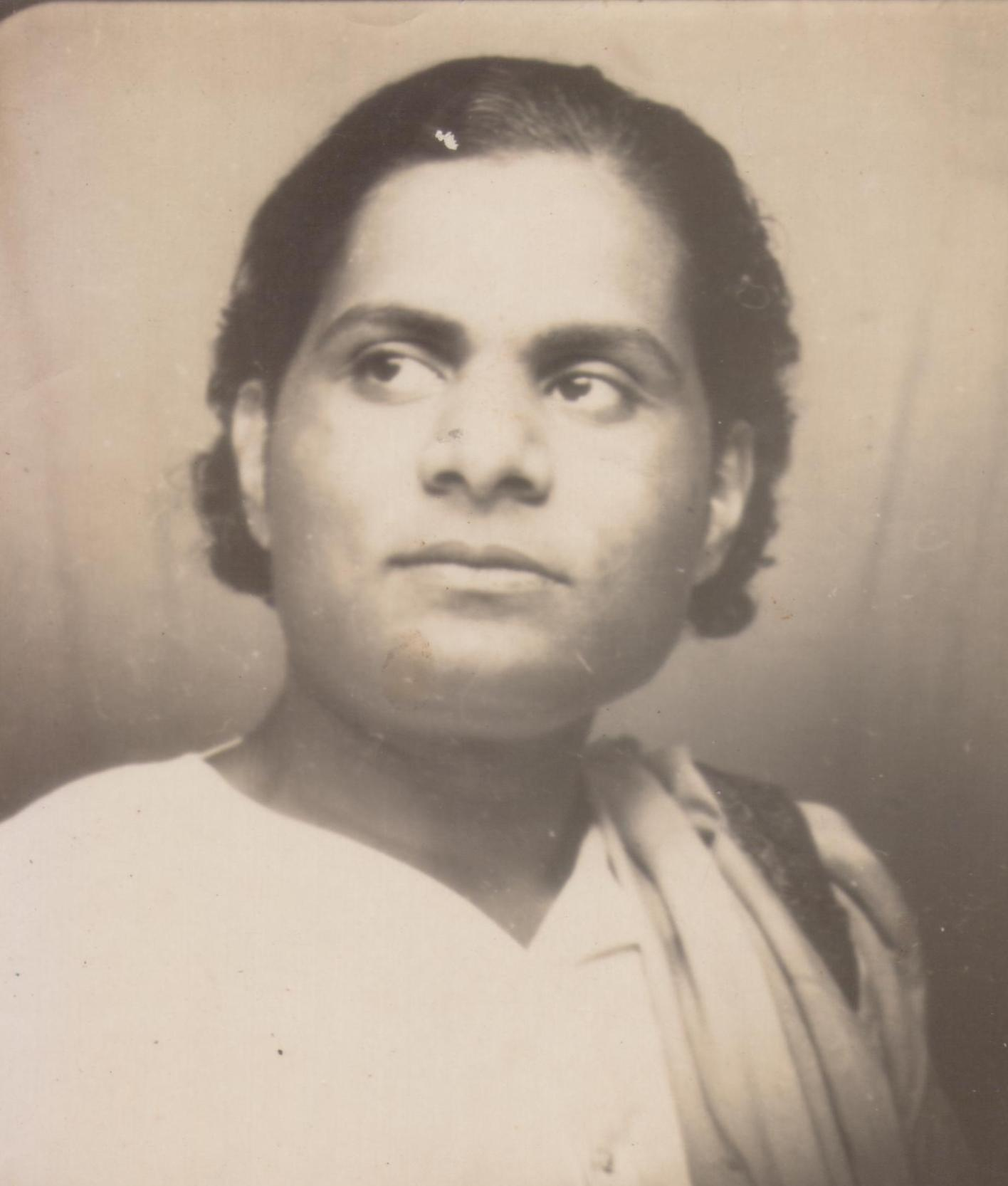
- Born: 12 May 1912; Lucknow, United Provinces of Agra and Oudh, India
- Died: 10 November 1986 (aged 74); New Delhi, India

Sukumar Bose (12 May 1912 – 10 November 1986) was an Indian artist based in Delhi who was trained in the tradition of the Bengal School under Asit Kumar Haldar.

== Career ==
In 1932 aged 20, Sukumar Bose was appointed art teacher at the Modern School Delhi. Bose taught at the school until 1947. Bose, along with his predecessors including Sarada Ukil, has been credited for introducing the Bengal School art tradition and style to North India.

Throughout his artistic career, Bose was actively involved in the promotion of Indian art and culture. He was a pioneer member of the All India Fine Arts and Crafts Society (AIFACS), the precursor to what is today's state-run Lalit Kala Academy. As an active member of the AIFACS, he was involved in the publication of Roopa Lekha, a bi-annual art journal.

Bose's society memberships included the following:

1. The Governing Council, All India Fine Arts & Crafts Society
2. Army Headquarters Dramatic Society, New Delhi
3. Board of Technical Education, Delhi

In 1950, Bose was commissioned by the Venerable Pope Pius XII, head of the Roman Catholic Church at the time, to produce a piece in the Indian style on a Christian subject. This piece, "The Nativity – The Birth of Christ" is housed at The Vatican.

Between 1952 and 1960, Bose conducted numerous solo exhibitions in countries including the United Kingdom, the United States of America, Australia and the former USSR, as well as in cities across India.

When he retired in 1972, Bose was appointed honorary art advisor to the then President Shri V.V. Giri. Bose held this position until 1974.

== Work ==
Sukumar Bose's style can be described as Indo-Persian. He used largely solid colours such as black, red, gold and silver, but in softer tones. Bose painted several murals and frescoes. Some of his most striking wall paintings are in Rashtrapati Bhavan.

Bose also ventured into modern art by blending old and new techniques. However, Bose always adhered to classical principles of realism. As a result of his art education, Bose was more of a traditionalist, preferring realism over the more abstract styles of interpretation. Described by The Bombay Chronicle as a "versatile artist", Bose was a firm believer in the learning of technique. To him, anyone who argued otherwise was merely incapable of withstanding "a steady and strenuous physical and intellectual hardship.

== Awards ==
1970 Padma Shri Award
