= Gabdulkhay Akhatov =

Soviet Tatar linguist (1927–1986)

Gabdulkhay Akhatov Габдулхай Хурамович Ахатов Габделхәй Хурам улы Əхәтов
- Born: September 8, 1927; Staroye Aymanovo village, Menzelinsky Canton, Russian SFSR, Soviet Union
- Died: November 25, 1986 (aged 59); Naberezhnyye Chelny, Russian SFSR, Soviet Union
- Education: Kazan State Pedagogical Institute
- Occupations: Professor of Philology, Turkologist, Linguist
- Known for: foundation of the modern Tatar dialectological and phraseological research schools
- Spouse: Roza Akhatova, née Deminova (born July 11, 1929)
- Awards
- Website: https://www.akhatov.org

Signature
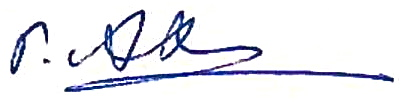

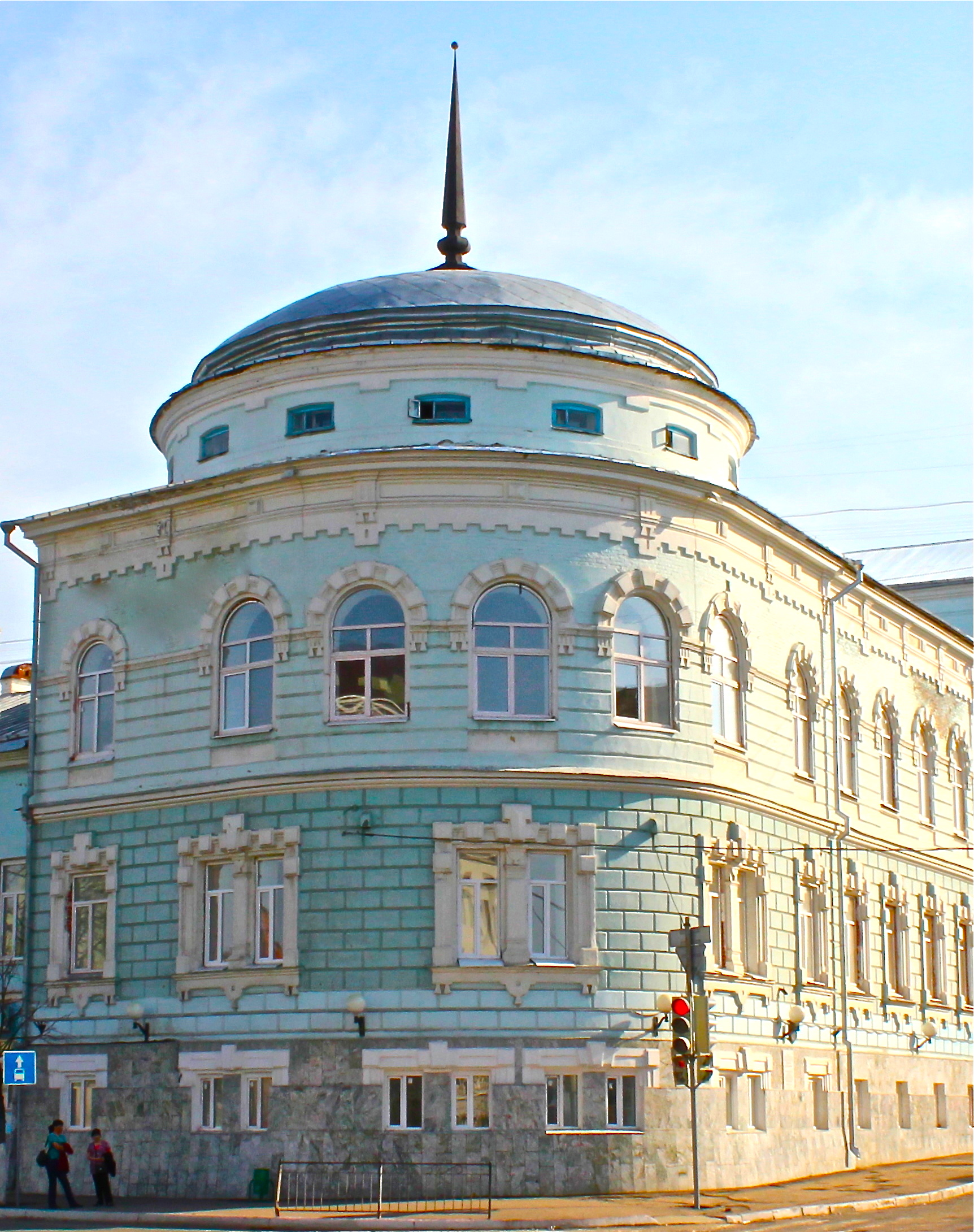
Alma mater of professor Akhatov - Kazan State Pedagogical Institute (now - the Kazan (Volga region) Federal University)

Gabdulkhay Khuramovich Akhatov (Russian: Габдулха́й Хура́мович Аха́тов; Volga Tatar: Габделхәй Хурам улы Əхәтов; September 8, 1927 – November 25, 1986) was a Soviet Tatar Linguist, Turkologist and an organizer of science (earning his first Ph.D. in 1954) and then a second doctorate of Philology in 1965, attaining professorship in 1970.

Akhatov graduated with honors from Kazan State Pedagogical Institute in 1951 and later from graduate school in 1954. He became a member of the Higher Attestation Commission of the Council of Ministers of the USSR and was also chairman of the specialized boards for doctoral and master's theses in a number of universities across the now-defunct USSR.

Akhatov was the founder of a number of research institutions, including the modern scientific school of Tatar dialectological and the phraseological Kazan school.

Although Gabdulkhay Akhatov was a Volga Tatar, he immersed into studying of the phonetic peculiarities of Siberian Tatar language of the indigenous population of Siberia, the Siberian Tatars. In his classic fundamental research work "The Dialect of the West Siberian Tatars" (1963) Akhatov wrote about Tobol-Irtysh Siberian Tatars, a western group of Siberian Tatars, who are indigenous to the Omsk and Tyumen Oblasts.

A number of his scientific works were highly praised at the XIII International Congress of Linguists (ICL) (Tokyo, 1982). Akhatov organized and led several dialectological expeditions and was the author of fundamental scientific works, dictionaries, textbooks, manuals and programs for dialectology, phraseology, and lexicology.

He was a recipient of the Medal "For Labour Valour" and the Medal "Veteran of Labour".

His son Aydar Akhatov (born 20 June 1957) is a Russian state, political and public figure, Economist, a second doctorate in Economics, Ecologist and Lawyer.
