= Unseen (audio comic) =

Unseen is a comic book produced in audio format by Chad Allen. It is the only known example of a publication written by a blind person featuring a blind heroine. It is the story of blind assassin Afsana addressing how her disability and identity are perceived by society. Unseen was included in the exhibit Self, Made at the Exploratorium in San Francisco, CA. The 25 minute audio comic is a performance starring Vanessa Claire Stewart, Misty Lee, Max Maven, and Patrick Culliton. According to the author, the format of the comic is first and foremost to make it accessible to blind and sighted audiences, but also meant to encourage people to realize that enjoying comics does not require sight. “You don’t see art with your eyes. You don’t see anything with your eyes. All your eyes do is filter light. You see with your brain, and that’s what I’m trying to teach to people more than anything." The audio comic was sound designed and directed by Tom Paolantonio.
