= Lon Graf =

American football player and coach (1896–1986)

Biographical details
- Born: June 12, 1896; Grafton, Nebraska, U.S.
- Died: November 7, 1986 (aged 90)

Playing career
- 1917: Nebraska

Coaching career (HC unless noted)
- 1919–1921: Tecumseh HS (NE)
- 1923–1929: Peru Normal

Administrative career (AD unless noted)
- 1922–1930: Peru Normal

Head coaching record
- Overall: 47–7–6 (college)

Accomplishments and honors

Championships
- 2 NIC/NCAC (1924, 1927); 2 NIAA (1928–1929)

Lon R. Graf (June 12, 1896 – November 7, 1986) was an American college football player and coach. He served as the head football coach at Peru State College from 1923 to 1929, compiling a record of 47–7–6.

== Head coaching record ==
=== College ===
Year	Team	Overall	Conference	Standing	Bowl/playoffs
Peru Normal Bobcats (Nebraska Intercollegiate Conference / Nebraska College Athletic Conference) (1923–1927)
1923	Peru Normal	6–1–2	4–1–2	T–4th	
1924	Peru Normal	8–0	6–0	1st	
1925	Peru Normal	6–3	6–1	T–2nd	
1926	Peru Normal	7–1–1	5–1–1	2nd	
1927	Peru Normal	8–0	6–0	1st	
Peru Normal Bobcats (Nebraska Intercollegiate Athletic Association) (1928–1929)
1928	Peru Normal	6–1–1	3–0	1st	
1929	Peru Normal	6–1–2	3–1	T–1st	
Peru Normal:		47–7–6	33–4–3		
Total:		47–7–6			
National championship Conference title Conference division title or championship game berth
