= Roy Estes =

American football player

No. 3 – Georgia Bulldogs
- Position: Halfback

Career information
- College: Georgia (1927)

Roy Estes was an American college football player, a triple-threat running back for the Georgia Bulldogs. He threw a 51-yard touchdown out of a punt formation to H. F. Johnston against Clemson. He also had a 52-yard run against Furman.
