= Rudolf Hess (artist) =

American painter (1903–1986)

- Born: January 31, 1903; Valley Ford, California, U.S.
- Died: November 9, 1986 (aged 83); Sacramento, California, U.S.
- Other name: Rudi Hess
- Education: San Francisco Art Institute
- Occupations: Painter; sculptor; art critic
- Years active: 1920s–1970s
- Style: German Expressionist
- Spouse: Florence Louise Mackie (m. 1946)

Signature
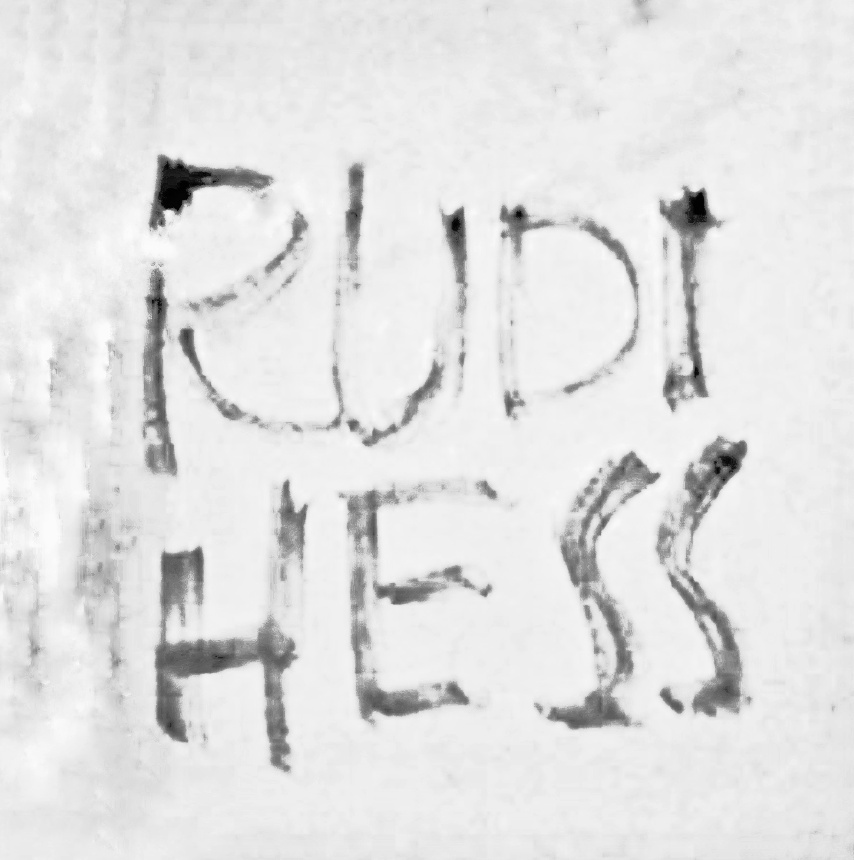

Rudolf Hess (January 31, 1903 – November 9, 1986) was an American fine art painter, sculptor and art critic, based in Northern California. His work is of the German Expressionist school and the subject matter covers many genres including landscapes and nature, portraits and everyday city life.

== Biography ==
Rudolf Hess was born January 31, 1903, in Valley Ford, a town 75 miles north of San Francisco, in Sonoma County, California. He attended California School of Fine Arts (CSFA) (now known as the San Francisco Art Institute) in the 1920s.

Hess was an art critic and contributor to The Argus, which was a popular San Francisco-based art journal, known for being conservative and primarily highlighting the technical aspects of painting. Hess visited artist Diego Rivera in Mexico, in order to write about him and learn more about his process and his most recent mural. However Hess wrote a scathing review in The Argus (in 1928) titled, “The Tragedy of Rivera," which criticized Diego Rivera as an artist, and Rivera's mural at Secretaría de Educación Pública in Mexico City. This article polarized the art community and prompted artist Ralph Stackpole, who was both a founder of The Argus and a friend of Diego Rivera to write a letter in January 1929 to The Argus editor, in response.

From 1929 to 1968, Hess worked in Sacramento for the California Department of Transportation. Hess married Florence Louise Mackie in 1946 in Burlingame, California.

In 1971, Hess served as president of Northern California Arts Inc. (NCA), an arts nonprofit in the Sacramento, California area.

== Death and legacy ==
Hess died on November 9, 1986, in Sacramento, California.

Hess is included in the 1940s book, Who's Who in American Art and in Edan Milton Hughes' Artists in California 1786-1940.

A 1982 magazine was published by the California Department of Transportation, Highway Recollections of Rudolf Hess, Issue 35 and constituents of a recorded interview of Hess.

== Exhibitions ==
- 1925 – San Francisco Art Association;
- 1926 – San Francisco Art Association;
- 1927 – San Francisco Art Association;
- 1927 – Modern Gallery (in San Francisco), solo exhibition;
- 1928 – Oakland Art Gallery;
- 1935 – San Francisco Museum of Art (SFMA), inaugural exhibition;
- 1945 – San Francisco Museum of Art (SFMA);
- 1949 – Crocker Art Museum;
- 1951 – Crocker Art Museum.
