= I Thank a Fool (novel) =

1958 novel

- First edition (UK)
- Author: Audrey Erskine Lindop
- Language: English
- Genre: Thriller
- Publisher: Collins (Britain); Doubleday (US)
- Publication date: 1958
- Publication place: United Kingdom
- Media type: Print

I Thank a Fool is a 1958 novel by the British writer Audrey Erskine Lindop. In the United States it was published by Doubleday under the alternative title of Mist over Talla.

In 1962 it was adapted into a film I Thank a Fool starring Susan Hayward, Peter Finch and Diane Cilento.

== Bibliography ==
- Goble, Alan. The Complete Index to Literary Sources in Film. Walter de Gruyter, 1999.
- Vinson, James. Twentieth-Century Romance and Gothic Writers. Macmillan, 1982.
