= Johnny Broadnax =

American football player and coach (1904–1986)

Biographical details
- Born: January 10, 1904; Ensley, Alabama, U.S.
- Died: November 22, 1986 (aged 82); Athens, Georgia, U.S.

Playing career

Football
- 1924–1927: Georgia
- Position: Quarterback

Coaching career (HC unless noted)

Football
- 1928–1929: Georgia Military
- 1930–1937: Georgia (freshmen)

Basketball
- 1928–1930: Georgia Military
- 1930–1938: Georgia (freshmen)

Baseball
- 1928: Georgia (freshmen)
- 1929–1930: Georgia Military
- 1931–1937: Georgia (freshmen)

Administrative career (AD unless noted)
- 1938–1948: Georgia (assistant AD)

John Ellis Broadnax (January 10, 1904 – November 22, 1986) was an American college football player and coach.

== Playing career ==
Broadnax was born in the Ensley neighborhood of Birmingham, Alabama, and grew up in Atlanta. He played quarterback for the University School for Boys in Stone Mountain, Georgia, leading the Bluebirds to a state title as a senior. Pup Phillips was team's coach.

Broadnax then went the University of Georgia, where he play for Georgia Bulldogs football team. Broadnax was quarterback for the 1927 Georgia Bulldogs "dream and wonder team" which defeated Yale.

== Coaching career and military service ==
Broadnax coached the freshman baseball team at Georgia in the spring of 1928. He was then named football, basketball, and baseball coach at Georgia Military College (GMC). He led the Georgia Military football team to a state title in 1929.

Broadnax returned to his alma mater, Georgia, as a freshman football, basketball, and baseball coach in 1930. He was an assistant athletic director at Georgia from 1938 to 1948.

In 1942, Broadnax was commissioned as a lieutenant in the United States Navy. He returned to Georgia in 1945, after three years of military service during World War II.

== Death ==
Broadnax died on November 22, 1986, in Athens, Georgia, from complications of pneumonia.
