= Aydar Akhatov =

Russian lawyer and economist (born 1957)

Akhatov, Aydar Gabdulkhaevich Rus. Ахатов, Айдар Габдулхаевич Tat. Əхәтов, Айдар Габделхәй улы
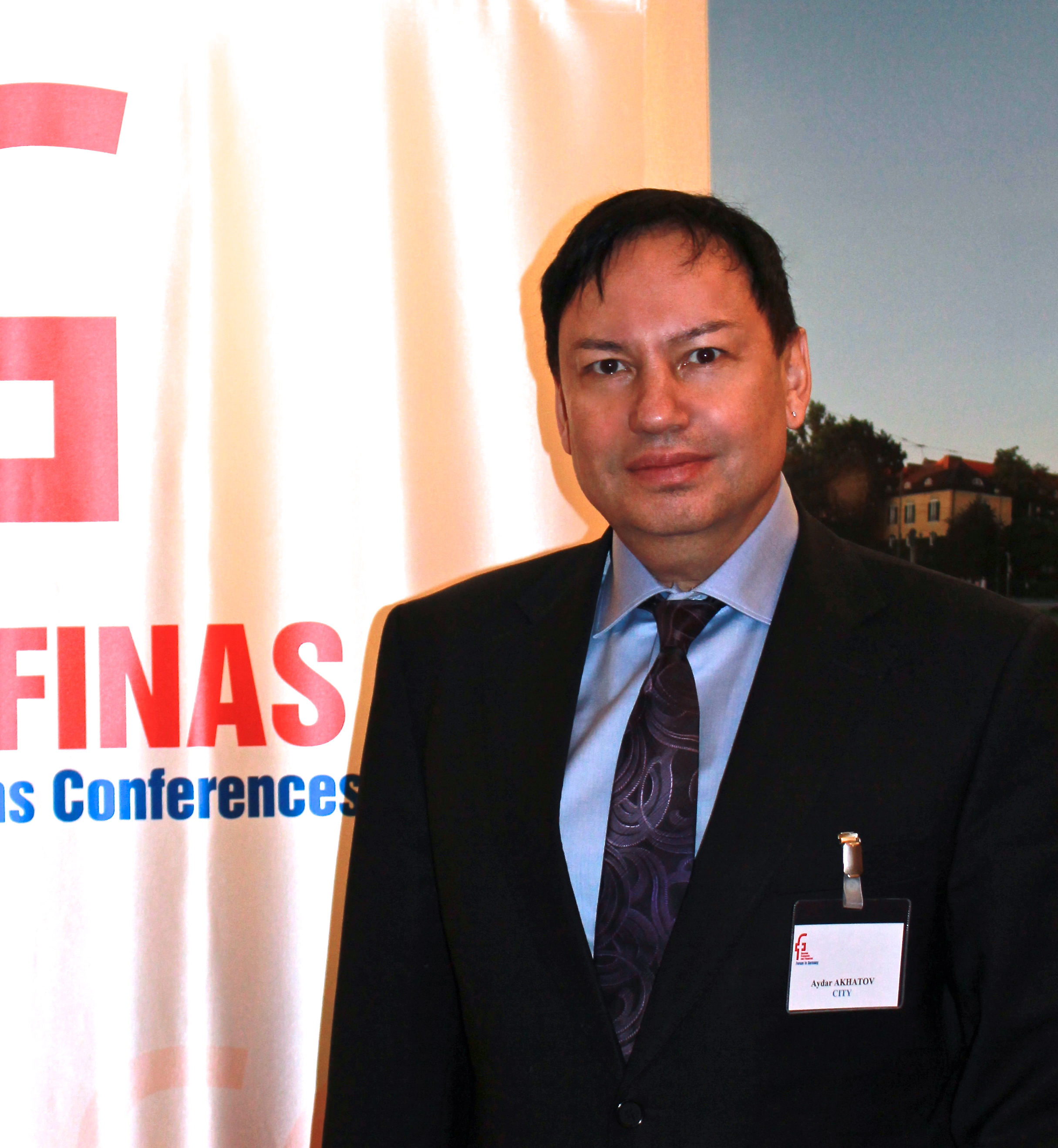
- Aydar Akhatov (Germany, 2010)
- Born: 20 June 1957 (age 69); Tobolsk, Tyumen Oblast, Russian SFSR, Soviet Union
- Education: Kazan State University, Bashkir State University, Saint Petersburg Mining Institute, UCLA
- Occupations: Lawyer, economist, ecologist
- Known for: President of the company "CITY", economist, president of the first environmental fund in the USSR / Russia, author of the first Russian ecological encyclopedia, ecologist, artist
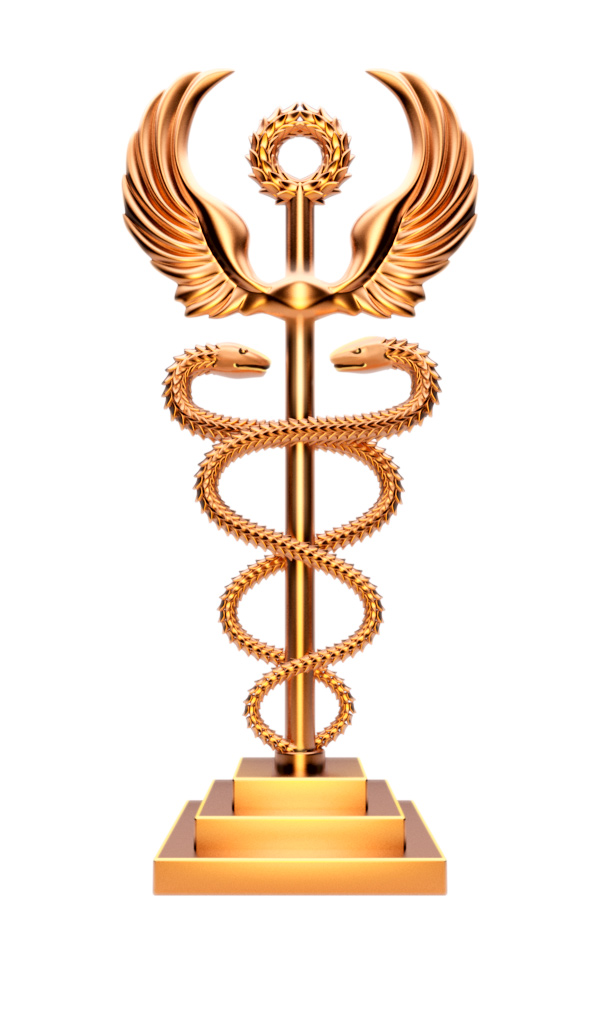
- Awards
- Website: www.akhatov-a.ru

Aydar Gabdulkhaevich Akhatov (Russian: Айдар Габдулхаевич Ахатов; Tatar: Айдар Габделхәй улы Əхәтов; born 20 June 1957) is a Russian state, political and public figure, journalist, scientist-economist, ecologist, lawyer, artist.

== Biography ==
Aydar Akhatov is an international expert in the field of ecology and economic management methods of environmental protection. The chairman of the Commission of experts, a member of Presidium of the Higher Ecological Council at the State Duma of the Russian Federation (1997–2008). DSc in Economics (1998). The academician of the Russian Academy of the humanities. The academician of the International Academy of Ecology, Man and Nature Protection Sciences (the General Consultative state of Economic and Social Council (ECOSOC) of the United Nations). The academician of the International Informatizational Academy of (the General Consultative state of Economic and Social Council (ECOSOC) of the United Nations). Having three higher educations in the Russian Federation (economics, law, ecological-geographical), Aydar Akhatov graduated also UCLA. One of the founders and leaders of the ecological movement in Russia. The active participant and the organizer of various international conferences and symposiums for ecological problematics. The delegate of the First All-Russian Congress on Environmental Protection (the delegate from the Republic of Tatarstan), Moscow, 3–5 June 1995.

Aydar Akhatov developed the system of the economic mechanism of nature management and environmental protection in the conditions of transition to the market relations (1990). He based the first in the USSR / Russia off-budget state ecological fund with the rights of the legal person (1990), thereby having begun formation of the system of off-budget state funds on various segments at the country. The founder of the first in the USSR / Russia municipal sanitary-ecological police (1990), which became a prototype of the creation of the similar structures in many regions of the country, including Moscow. Aydar Akhatov is the author of the first Russian encyclopaedic dictionary "Ecology" (1st edition 1994, 2nd edition 1995). For the first time he developed a technique of definition and withdrawal of rent payments. He is also the author of some federal and regional (Tatarstan) bills and comments on the legislation of the natural resources block.

Aydar Akhatov is the founder and first head of the state institution for the formation of the gold reserves of the Republic of Tatarstan (Russia), Deputy Minister of Finance (1998–1999).

Aydar Akhatov started to be engaged in active political activity since 1989 on "ecological" wave. In April 1990, working as the chief of ecological inspection of executive committee of the Naberezhnochelninsky City Council, despite the interdiction from the first persons of local party and Soviet authorities, Aydar Akhatov warned the city population through mass media about adverse ecological conditions in the city (availability of phenol in potable water as a result of failure on one of NPZ in Ufa). For unapproved performance on the city radio and automobile plant "KAMAZ" he was dismissed the chief of inspection, and then by the protest of the public prosecutor on the decision of the executive committee of the City Soviet of People's Deputies he was again restored. Akhatov A. G's given performance prevented a mass poisoning of the population of the city with substandard water. Subsequently, as the advocate of ecological publicity he was selected the People's Deputy, the chairman of the constant Commissions on publicity and ecology of Naberezhnochelninsky city council of People's Deputies, the People's Deputy of the Supreme Soviet of the Tatar ASSR. In 1990 Aydar Akhatov received a title of the most popular regional politician "Mr. Time-'90". In 1990–1991, according to sociological interrogations of the population of Tatarstan, spent by sociological laboratory of Parliament of Tatarstan, he occupied second place in the rating of popularity among state and politicians of republic, having conceded first place only to the President of the Republic of Tatarstan Mintimer Shaimiev.

=== Career milestones ===
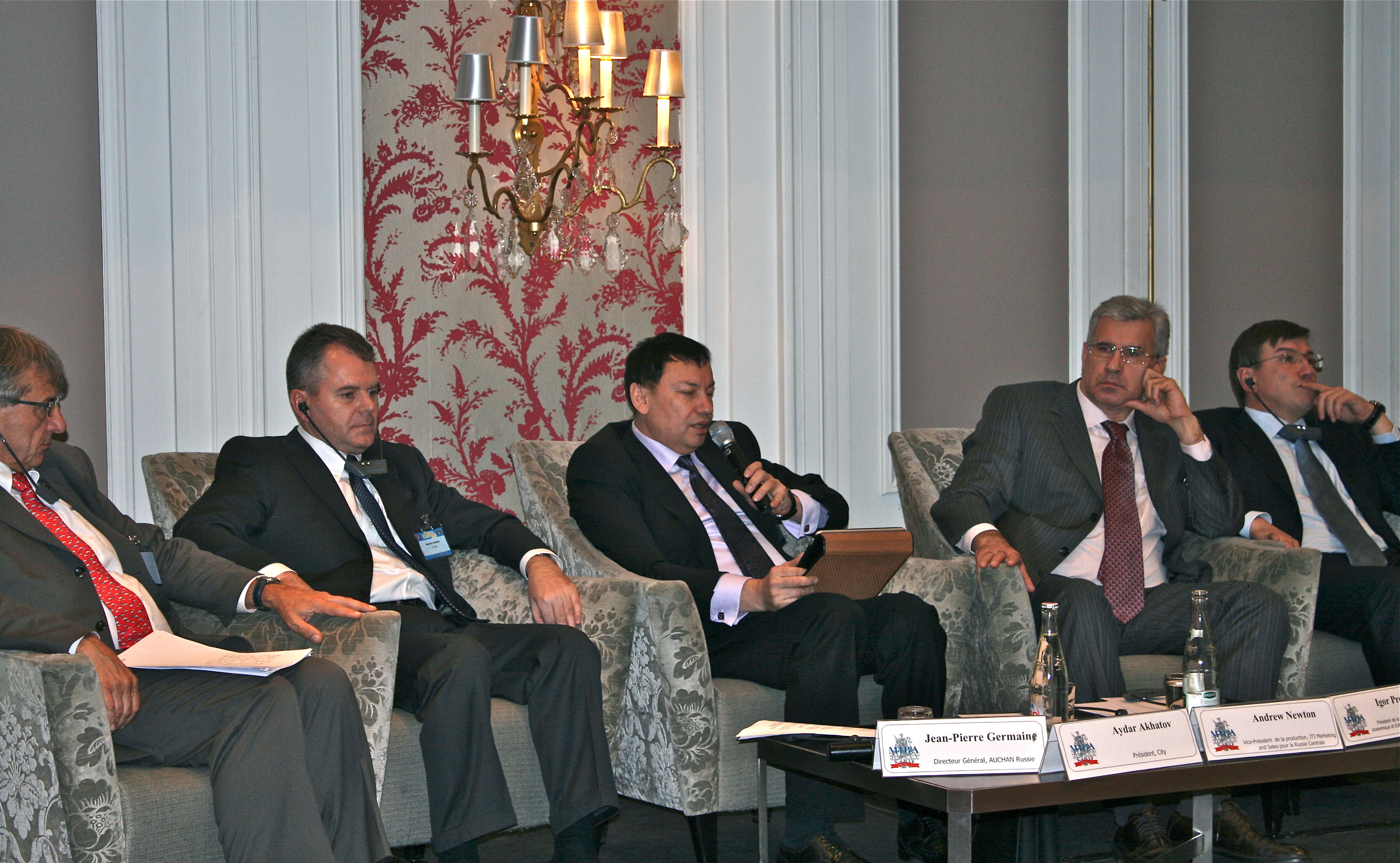
President of the company "CITY" Aydar Akhatov (center) was the moderator (Co-chair) at the International French-Russian Investment Forum in Paris (29 October 2010).

1986–2000: he was on supervising work in the state structures of the power and management in the Republic of Tatarstan, including the Mayoralty (on a post of the chief ecologist of a city) and in the City council of People's Deputies of the city Naberezhnye Chelny (as the deputy, the chairman of the constant Commission, a member of Presidium of the City Council), in the republic Government on a post of the Head of Gohran, the Deputy Minister of the finance, in Parliament – the Supreme Soviet of XII convocation as the People's Deputy, the chairman of deputy group (1990–1995), in Parliament – the State Council of I convocation as the deputy, the head of parliamentary fraction (1995–2000).

In 1999 Aydar Akhatov was the candidate of State Duma of the Russian Federation of III convocation.

He lives and works in Moscow: 2000–2003 he was the deputy Director General of Open Society "Roslesprom" (in combination he was the vice-president of Association of workers of law enforcement and special services of the Russian Federation (ARPO of the Russian Federation); 2003–2004 he works in the system of the Ministry of property relations of the Russian Federation: the First deputy Director General, acting Director General of the FGUP "Efes", the First deputy the Head of the Territorial administration «Agency of federal property of Moscow»; 2004–2006 — the chairman of board of directors of Group of the companies «National water resources", the chairman of the board of directors of Company "Tatinvest", the Representative of the Government of the Russian Federation in the board of directors of Open Society"Electrostalsky factory of heavy mechanical engineering", Open Society "Electroprivod"; 2006–2009 – Chief executive NPO "Promecologia"; since 2009 – First Vice-president, President, the member of the board of directors of the company "CITY" (management company for the creation and development of the Moscow International Business Center).

== Family ==
His father Gabdulkhay Huramovich Akhatov (8 September 1927 – 25 November 1986; Russia) was a Soviet Tatar linguist and an organizer of science (earning his first PhD in 1954) and then a second doctorate of philology in 1965, Professor (1970), an eminent public figurer, a member of the Soviet Committee of turkologists, a founder of some schools of thought: Soviet Tatar dialectological school of thought of Turkic languages, the Kazan phraseological school of thought, the Kazan school of thought of phonetics of Turkic languages. Professor G.Kh. Akhatov brought fundamental contribution to the research of dialects and lexicological features of Turkic languages, mainly, Tatar, in formation and development of phraseological researches. G.Akhatov was a founder of chairs of the Tatar language and the literature in a number of the state universities and teacher training colleges of the country in places of compact residing of the Tatar population, specialised councils about defence of doctor's and master's dissertations. G.Kh. Akhatov was the chairman of specialised councils about defence of doctor's and master's dissertations. He was an honours pupil of the higher school of the USSR. He was a member of the Higher Certifying commission of the USSR. G.Kh. Akhatov prepared more than 40 doctors and candidates of sciences, published about 200 proceedings. The head of a number of dialectological expeditions. The grandfather – Deminov Abdrahman Sultanovich (1 January 1906, the Russian Empire, Nizhniy Novgorod – 14 February, Poland, Bydgoshchsky province, Tuholya) was a major industrial and Soviet worker, one of founding fathers of the glass industry in the USSR (maternally). The mother – Roza Abdrahmanovna Akhatova (born on 11 July 1929, Tatarstan), a worker of education, teacher of Russian and literature with the 30-year experience, veteran of work; nowadays on pension, she lives in Kazan.

His children are minors.

== Other facts ==
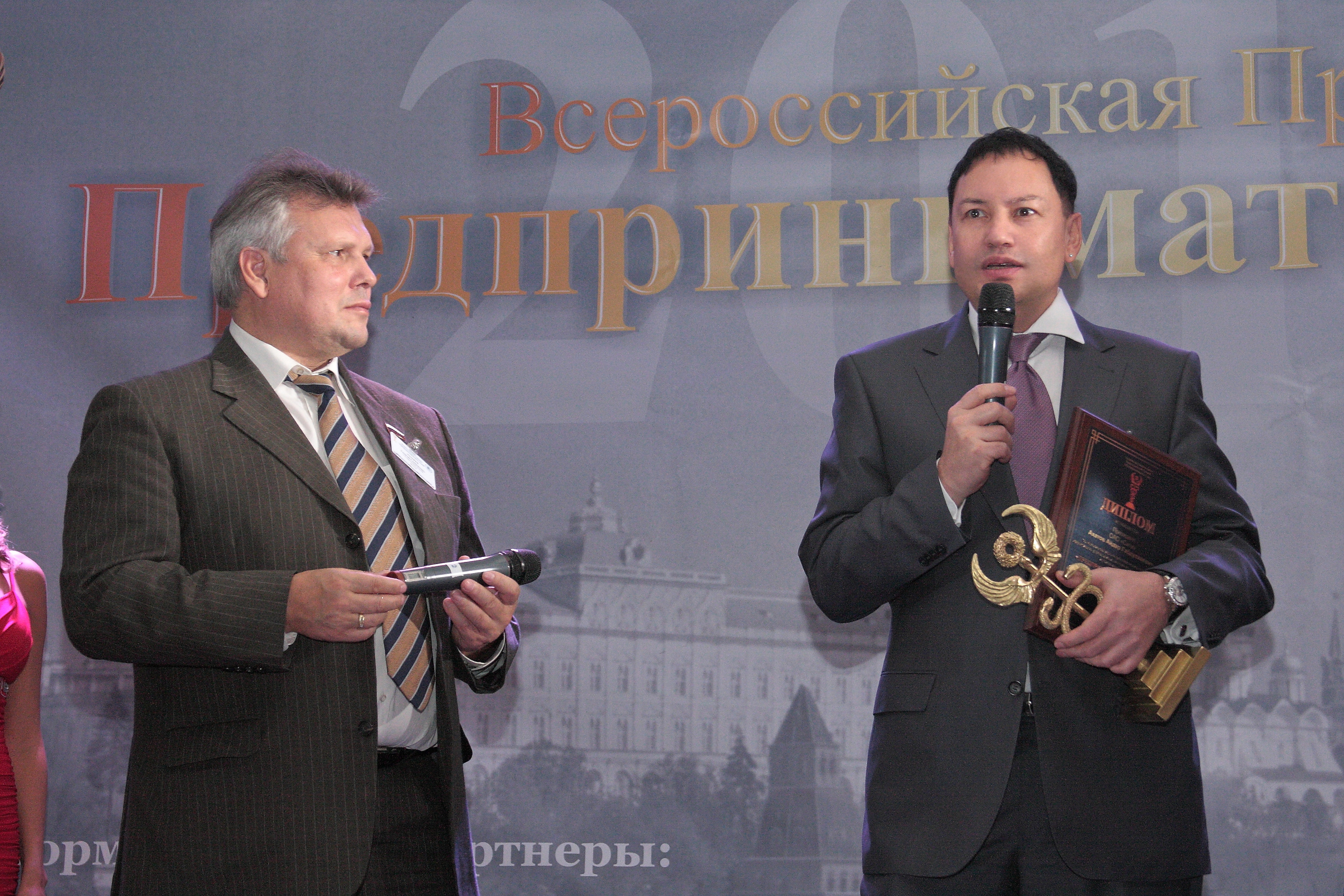
President of the company CITY Aydar Akhatov at the Award Ceremony (Moscow; 5 October 2010)

- Besides primary activity, interests and activity trends of Aydar Akhatov are many-sided: scientific and teaching activity (since 1997 he is professor in the state universities, he published more than 200 proceedings, including about 20 books in Russian, English, German, French, Japanese and Tatar language journalism, music (Aydar Akhatov plays many musical instruments, including a piano), the fine arts (painting); sports (mountain skiing, yoga, swimming, tennis, badminton, fitness).
- He is the President of the International Association of Fine Arts (since 2008). Mr. Akhatov is also the first deputy board of trustees of the theater "Moscow Ballet," a member of the International Confederation of Journalists, a member of the Union of Journalists of Russia, a member of the editorial board of several journals. He has awards.
- Aydar Akhatov is a prototype of the hero of story by Vahit Imamova "Armchair" (1992): ecologist – chief Inspectorate for Environmental Protection Executive Committee Akhatov struggling with bureaucratic arbitrariness and lawlessness, in the interests of citizens (in the period of the events Aydar Akhatov worked as the chief ecologist of Naberezhnye Chelny).
- Influential Japanese newspaper Yomiuri Shimbun in 1989 called him a pioneer of the environmental movement in Russia.

== Basic works ==
- Akhatov Aydar. Mineralization and Hardness of the Bashkiria River Water / / Proc. USSR State Committee for Hydrometeorology and Environmental Control "Hydrochemistry of the Urals". – Leningrad: "Gidrometeoizdat", 1985, No. 8. (in Russian)
- Akhatov Aydar. Water and Civilization / / "NL", 1986, No. 23. (in German)
- Akhatov Aydar. Perestroika and Environmental Protection in the USSR / / 'NL', 1988, No. 36. (in German)
- Akhatov Aydar. About Holding of Elective Classes in Geography / / J. USSR State Committee for Public Education "Geography at School", 1988, No. 4. (in Russian)
- Akhatov Aydar. Ecology and Publicity / / 'NL', 1988, No. 50. (in German)
- Akhatov Aydar. About the Transition to Economic Methods of Environmental Management / / Pr. 'Materials International (East-West) Conference on Environmental Technology.' Moscow, 1989. (in English and Russian)
- Akhatov Aydar. Environmental Safety / / 'NL', 1989, No. 4. (in German)
- Akhatov Aydar. Alternative of Environmental Shock / / J. USSR Academy of Sciences 'ECO (Economy and Industrial Engineering).' – Novosibirsk: 'Science', 1990, No. 1 (187). (in Russian)
- Akhatov Aydar. AIDS and the Environment / / 'NL', 1990, No. 6. (in German)
- Akhatov Aydar. Goskompriroda Needs an Opponent / / 'N L', 1990, No. 35. (in German)
- Akhatov Aydar. Development and Implementation of the Economic Mechanism of Nature (Scientific Guidelines and the First Experience of the Implementation in the Tatar SSR). – Kazan: 'Kamsky Environment Fund', 1991. (in Russian)
- Akhatov Aydar. Development and Improvement of Economic Methods of Environmental Management in the Transition to Market Economy. – Moscow: "The Federal Environmental Fund of the Russian Federation", "Ecopolis", 1992. (in Russian)
- Akhatov Aydar. «ECOPOLICE – 2000» is the Programme of Creation of the Ecologically Clean Town «L, Eau dans la Ville», United National Organization, WHO, NANCIE, The International Water Centre, Paris, Nancy (France), 1994. (in English and French)
- Akhatov Aydar. Ecology (New Collegiate Dictionary). 2nd ed. (With ext. And rev.). – Kazan: 'TKI' – 'Ecopolis', 1995. ISBN 978-5-298-00600-2 (in Russian)
- Akhatov Aydar. The Definition of the Differential Rent in Geological Exploration Production / / Proc. State Committee for Higher Education 'Managing of the Mineral Resources and the Environment.' – St. Petersburg: 'St. Petersburg Mining Institute named after G.V. Plekhanov.' 1995. (in Russian)
- Akhatov Aydar. Russia and Tatarstan: Ecological and Economic Sustain Ability Development Concept and Transborder Pollution Problem. – ECOLOGY AND SOCIETY'S DEVELOPMENT. – St. Petersburg: 1995. ISBN 978-5-900277-06-6 (in English)
- Akhatov Aydar. Ways Improvement of Economic Mechanism of Enforce Payment for Nature Environmental Pollution. – ECOLOGY AND SOCIETY'S DEVELOPMENT. – St. Petersburg:1995. ISBN 978-5-900277-01-1 (in English and Russian)
- Akhatov Aydar. Rent Relations and Rents in the Valuation of Mineral Resources. – Kazan, "TKI", 1995. ISBN 978-5-298-00624-8 (in Russian)
- Akhatov Aydar. Differential Rent and the Economic Evaluation of Mineral Resources (in the Transition to Market Economy). – Moscow: "AST-PRESS", 1996. ISBN 978-5-214-00223-1 (in Russian)
- Akhatov Aydar. Ecology and International Law. – Moscow: "AST-PRESS", 1996. ISBN 978-5-214-00225-5 (in English and Russian)
- Akhatov Aydar. Oil and Gas: the Resources and Prospects of Use / / Journal of the Government of the Republic of Tatarstan 'Tatarstan'. – Kazan: 'TKI', 1997, No. 1. (in Russian)
- Akhatov Aydar. Business Planning for Geological Enterprises. (Co – Ilinskiy A.A., Muslumov A.D.). – Moscow: 'Nedra', 1997. ISBN 978-5-247-03755-2 (in Russian)
- Akhatov Aydar. Oil Factor / / Journal of the Presidium of the Academy of Sciences of Tatarstan 'Science of Tatarstan'. – Kazan: 'TGZHI', 1997, No. 1. (in Russian)
- Akhatov Aydar. Model of Tatarstan: the Transition to Sustainable Development, Natural Resources Management and Regulation of Environmental Human Rights / / Pr.: Promoting International Humanitarian Law (the International Conference). – Kazan, 1997. (in Russian)
- Akhatov Aydar. Pesticides and Environment / / Journal of the Government of the Republic of Tatarstan 'Tatarstan'. – Kazan: 'TKI', 1997, No. 5. (in Russian)
- Akhatov Aydar. Oil and Gas Resources of Russia at the End of the Century. – Moscow: "Nedra", 1998. ISBN 978-5-247-03805-4 (in Russian)
- Akhatov Aydar. Ecological-Economic Model of Tatarstan and the Transition to Sustainable Development. / / 'Ecology: The Security of the Nation.' – Kazan: 'Ecopolis', 1998. (in Russian)
- Akhatov Aydar. Economics of Nature in Tatarstan (The Concept of Environmental and Economic Commensuration). – Nab.Chelny: "Ecopolis", 1995. (in Russian)
- Akhatov Aydar. Natural Resources are the Basis for Development / / Journal of the Government of the Republic of Tatarstan 'Tatarstan'. – Kazan: "TKI", 1998, No. 11–12. (in Russian)
- Akhatov Aydar. Law of the Republic of Tatarstan "On Production and Consumption" (Itemized Official Comment.) (Head of the Author). – Kazan: "Ecopolis", 1998. ISBN 978-5-89617-014-3 (in Russian)
- Akhatov Aydar. Financial Intelligence: the Causes of the Establishment in Russia / / Sa. of Association of Law Enforcement of the Russian Federation 'Dirty Money Laundering' (Information and Analysis). – Moscow: The Main Information-analytical Center of the ARPO of the Russian Federation. 2002, vol. 3. (in Russian)
- Akhatov Aydar. Compulsory State Insurance of Environmental Risks in the Oil and Gas Sector in Russia. / / Journal of the Ministry of Industry and Energy of the Russian Federation "ETR". – Moscow, 2005, No. 6. (in Russian)
- Akhatov Aydar. Environmental Responsibility of Business and the Formation of Corporate Environmental Policy in the Oil and Gas Sector of Economy. / / "Drilling & Oil" – Moscow, 2006, No. 7–8. (in Russian)
- Akhatov Aydar. Environmental Insurance as a Basic Element of the Economic Mechanism of Environmental Protection and Natural Resources in the Context of Environmental Security: Problems of Environmental Regulation. / / Eurasian Law Journal. Moscow, No. 19, 2009, ISSN 2073-4506. (in Russian)

== Сreativ (painting) ==
Aydar Akhatov paints pictures in different styles and genres (realism, Renaissance, surrealism, modernism, expressionism, cubism, pop art, etc.), using various techniques (oil painting, tempera, pastel, acrylic, drawing, watercolor, etc.).

In the early 21st century, Aydar Akhatov invented a new style of painting, which he called "art-sensualism" (from Lat. Sensus – perception, feeling, sensation), the meaning of which is that the result depends only on the creativity of impressions, feelings of the artist, and not by a so-called objective reality. Any particular item of reality any artist can paint their own way and this will be his only true reality at the time of the creative process.

The creator of the new language of painting Aydar Ahatov reveals in his paintings elusive, fleeting harmony of man and the environment.

Aydar Akhatov wrote more than 350 paintings, which are not only involved in exhibitions, but also purchased by private collectors and museums around the world (US, Switzerland, Germany, Australia, Japan, Italy, etc.).

== See also ==
- Environmental science
- Environmental law
- Gabdulkhay Akhatov
- Tatars
