= Audrey Erskine Lindop =

English writer (1920–1986)

Audrey Erskine Lindop (26 December 1920, London – 7 November 1986, Isle of Wight) was an English writer of various forms of fiction, including crime, mainstream and historical. She was active from 1948 to 1970. She was married to the writer Dudley Leslie with whom she sometimes collaborated.

Her novel I Start Counting won the Grand Prix de Littérature Policière in 1967, and was made into a film starring Jenny Agutter. Other novels which have been filmed are I Thank a Fool and The Singer Not the Song.

== Selected novels ==
- In Me My Enemy (1948)
- Soldiers' Daughters Never Cry (1948)
- The Tall Headlines (1950)
- The Singer Not the Song (1953) (AKA The Bandit and the Priest)
- Details of Jeremy Stretton (1955)
- The Outer Ring (1955) (AKA The Tormented)
- The Judas Figures (1956)
- Mist Over Talla (1957)
- I Thank a Fool (1958)
- Nicola (1959)
- The Way to the Lantern (1961)
- I Start Counting (1966)
- The Adventures of the Wuffle (1968) (Written with William Stobbs)
- Sight Unseen (1969)
- Journey Into Stone (1972)
- Out of the Whirlwind (1972)
- The Self-Appointed Saint (1975)

== Short stories ==
- 'Heirs Unapparent'. London Evening News, 16 March 1954
- 'As One Lady to Another'. London Evening News, 22 October 1954

== Filmography ==
- Blanche Fury (1948) - screenwriter
- Tall Headlines (1952) - screenwriter, story by
- The Rough and the Smooth (1959) - screenwriter
- The Singer Not the Song (1961) - story by
- I Thank a Fool (1962) - story by
- I Start Counting (1970) - story by
- Danger on Dartmoor (1980) - screenwriter, story by

== Prizes and awards ==
- Grand Prize of Crime Fiction for the thriller Dash Through The Bill
