= Richard E. Turner =

- Born: April 8, 1920; Cushing, Oklahoma
- Died: November 15, 1986 (aged 66)
- Military career
- Allegiance: United States
- Branch: United States Army Air Forces; United States Air Force
- Service years: 1941–1953
- Rank: Lieutenant Colonel
- Commands: 356th Fighter Squadron
- Conflicts: World War II; Korean War
- Awards: Silver Star; Distinguished Flying Cross (2); Air Medal (13)

Richard Eugene Turner (April 8, 1920 – November 15, 1986) was a fighter pilot with the 9th Air Force in the European Theater during World War II and early in the Korean War. He became an ace during World War II, scoring 12 victories. He was named commanding officer of the 356th Fighter Squadron of the 354th Fighter Group in February 1944. He wrote of his experience in Mustang Pilot, first published in 1970.

In World War II Turner was awarded the following decorations: Silver Star, Distinguished Flying Cross with one oak leaf cluster, Air Medal with 12 oak leaf clusters, Croix de Guerre with Palm, EAME Ribbon with 4 Bronze Stars, and ATO Ribbon with one Bronze Star.
