= Sight Unseen (novel) =

1969 novel

- First edition
- Author: Audrey Erskine Lindop
- Cover artist: Michael Johnson
- Language: English
- Genre: Thriller
- Publisher: Collins (Britain); Doubleday (US)
- Publication date: 1969
- Publication place: United Kingdom
- Media type: Print

Sight Unseen is a 1969 thriller novel by the British writer Audrey Erskine Lindop.

== Bibliography ==
- Vinson, James. Twentieth-Century Romance and Gothic Writers. Macmillan, 1982.
