= I Thank a Fool =

1962 British film by Robert Stevens

- Original film poster
- Directed by: Robert Stevens
- Written by: Karl Tunberg
- Based on: I Thank a Fool; 1958 novel by Audrey Erskine Lindop
- Produced by: Anatole de Grunwald
- Starring: Susan Hayward; Peter Finch; Diane Cilento; Cyril Cusack
- Cinematography: Harry Waxman
- Edited by: Frank Clarke
- Music by: Ron Goodwin
- Production company: De Grunwald Productions
- Distributed by: Metro-Goldwyn-Mayer
- Release dates: January 1962 (UK); 14 September 1962 (U.S.)
- Running time: 100 minutes
- Country: United Kingdom
- Language: English

I Thank a Fool is a 1962 British Metrocolor crime film directed by Robert Stevens and starring Susan Hayward and Peter Finch. It was made by Eaton (De Grunwald Productions) and Metro-Goldwyn-Mayer in CinemaScope and produced by Anatole de Grunwald from a screenplay by Karl Tunberg based on the 1958 novel of the same title by Audrey Erskine Lindop. The music score was by Ron Goodwin and the cinematography by Harry Waxman.

== Plot ==
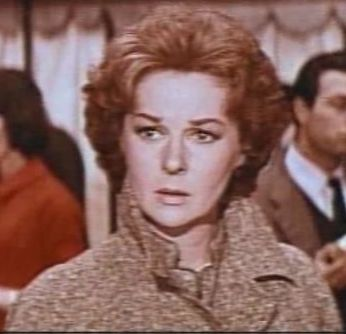
Susan Hayward in I Thank a Fool trailer

Dr. Christine Allison is convicted of manslaughter for the mercy killing of her terminally ill, married lover. After serving two years in prison, she is unable to find work.

Help comes from a surprising source – she is approached by Stephen Dane, the man who prosecuted her, to look after his disturbed wife Liane. Suspicious, she presses him for the reason he wants her. His need is a trained doctor, but not one who has the power to commit Liane to a mental asylum. Since Christine's medical license has been taken away, she is perfect. Desperate, she accepts the job.

Christine's misgivings about Stephen's motives increase as time goes by. The final straw comes when Liane's father, Captain Ferris, unexpectedly appears while the Danes are out. Christine had been told that his death in a car accident had unhinged Liane. He leaves without seeing his daughter, despite Christine's pleas.

Christine tells Liane the truth and persuades her to go back to her childhood home in Ireland to see her father. They find him there, drunk and living with a woman. A disillusioned Liane has another breakdown. When Stephen shows up, she falls while running away. The injury is not serious, and the doctor gives Christine a bottle of pills. As instructed, she gives Liane two to help her sleep.

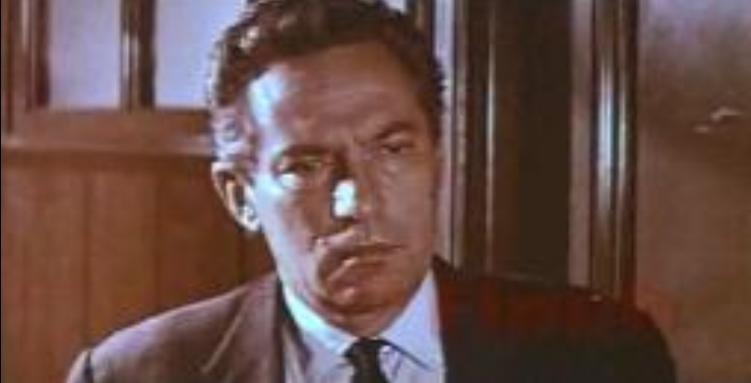
Peter Finch in the film's trailer

The next morning, Liane is found dead and the bottle is missing. At the inquest, the coroner uncovers Christine's past. In her defense, she accuses Stephen of hiring her to draw suspicion away from him.

During a recess, she notices Ferris looking at his heirloom pocket watch, though Liane had stolen it and had it with her the night before her death. He admits Liane took the overdose herself. He found her dead and took the bottle away. In the past, he had been prosecuted by Stephen and had tried to bribe him by sending his then seventeen-year-old daughter to Stephen's hotel room. When the charges were dropped (though Stephen claims it was for other reasons), Ferris began blackmailing him. Stephen finally balked at paying more money, so Ferris took the opportunity to get back at him.

As the police try to take him into custody, Ferris leans against a rotted fence and falls to his death. Stephen asks Christine for a lift and they drive away together.

== Cast ==
- Susan Hayward as Christine Allison
- Peter Finch as Stephen Dane
- Diane Cilento as Liane Dane
- Cyril Cusack as Captain Ferris
- Kieron Moore as Roscoe
- Richard Wattis as Ebblington
- Athene Seyler as Aunt Heather
- Miriam Karlin as Woman in the Black Maria
- Laurence Naismith as O'Grady
- J.G. Devlin as Coroner
- Clive Morton as Judge
- Richard Leech as Irish doctor
- Brenda de Banzie as Nurse Drew
- Edwin Apps as Junior Counsel
- Grace Arnold as 2nd wardress
- Peter Sallis as prospective employer (uncredited)
- Peter Vaughan as Police Inspector (uncredited)
- Joan Benham as restaurant manageress (uncredited)

== Production ==
The film was based on a novel. Sol C. Siegel bought the film rights in March 1957, prior to publication, as a vehicle for Inger Stevens who the producer had under personal contract. The author was going to write the script. In June 1957 Peter Glenville signed to direct. By August the lead role was given to Ingrid Bergman with filming to take place in England and Ireland. Siegel set up the film at MGM where the producer was making a slate of movies including Home from the Hill, Some Came Running, Bachelor in Paradise, and The End of the World.

In January 1958 MGM announced the movie would be made in England that year. The same month John Patrick was reported as working on the script. However in March Grenville dropped out due to competing commitments. Filming kept being delayed. In July 1960 MGM announced the film's stars would be Susan Hayward and Stewart Granger. Eventually Granger dropped out and was replaced by Peter Finch. The job of directing was given to Robert Stevens who had never made a film before but had a strong reputation as a television director. Finch called him "the most exciting director I've ever worked with."

De Grunwald had originally hired Gail Kubik to compose the score. Kubik had composed and recorded the score with the London Symphony Orchestra. But when MGM refused to relinquish the music rights, Kubik pulled his score from the production, and Ron Goodwin was hired to re-compose the score. Kubik later reworked his music into his composition Scenes for Orchestra.

== Reception ==
=== Box Office ===
According to MGM accounts the film lost $1,207,000.

== Critical ==
The Monthly Film Bulletin wrote: "Lashings of wild Irishry from Diane Cilento, a rather good performance by Cyril Cusack, as the sottish father, plenty of lip-biting from Susan Hayward, an old house with mysterious night sounds, fairground visits with the robust groom, tourist views of Ireland, insect-eating plants, a trial, an inquest, a prison sequence – all are flung unavailingly into this melodramatic pudding. It takes the confident presence of a Daphne du Maurier in the background to get away with this sort of thing. Here there is a fatal suggestion that Robert Stevens, a new director from American TV, has his own suspicions that it is all a bit absurd, while he keeps his camera tentatively prowling around the house, with an occasional roar from the sound track to communicate agitation. "

Variety wrote: "Co-starring of Susan Hayward and Peter Finch in this has not produced the chemistry that might have been anticipated. It is not the fault of the principals, but simply that the somewhat turgid screenplay and the implausibilities of this meller are too much for the cast. Robert Stevens' direction is fussy and the editing does not help to tidy up an ambling script."

In The Radio Times Guide to Films David McGillivray gave the film 2/5 stars, writing: "In this relishably hoary old melodrama, woman-with-a-past Susan Hayward becomes entangled with her old nemesis, barrister Peter Finch, and his mentally ill wife Diane Cilento. Euthanasia always provides a controversial plot point; the rest is murder mystery from another age, with ripe dialogue by Ben-Hur writer Karl Tunberg. The stellar cast do their best in one of MGM's prestige British productions, but audiences were unimpressed."

Leslie Halliwell wrote "Jane Eyre melodrama of the loonier type, with good actors struggling through a wild but unrewarding script."
