= Tatar State University of Humanities and Education =

University in Kazan, Russian Federation

Coordinates: 55.7846°N 49.1173°E

- Татар дәүләт гуманитар-педагогика университеты Татарский государственный гуманитарно-педагогический университет
- Type: State University (государственный университет)
- Active: October 24, 1876–2011 (merged into Kazan Federal University)
- Rector: Radif Rifkatovich Zamaletdinov
- Undergraduates: 15,000
- Location: Kazan, Russia

Tatar State University of Humanities and Education (Russian: Татарский государственный гуманитарно-педагогический университет, Tatar: Татар дәүләт гуманитар-педагогика университеты, romanized: Tatar däwlät ğumanitar-pedagogika universitetı) is a university in Kazan, Russian Federation. It was formed in 2005 by a merger of several institutions, some which had a particular focus on the use of Tatar as a medium of instruction or the study of the language itself, for example the Kazan State Pedagogical University and Tatar State Humanities Institute (the latter created in 1996 with the purpose of expanding Tatar-language higher education).

== History ==
The university was founded as the Kazan Teachers Institute (Russian: Казанский учительский институт), on October 24, 1876 in Kazan, Russia, with the goal of preparing teachers for work in city high schools. In the wake of the Russian Revolution, it was reorganized as the Kazan Teachers Institute in 1918. It was subsequently renamed Eastern Pedagogical Institute (1922), Tatar Pedagogical Institute (1931), Kazan State Pedagogical Institute (1934), and Kazan State Pedagogical University (1994). Over its history, the university's structure, role, and name have changed with the vagaries of nationalities policy. In 2005, the Tatar State Humanities University, Tatar-American Regional Institute, and Kazan State Pedagogical University merged, forming the present Tatar State University of Humanities and Education.

The 2005 merger created four new faculties, bringing the total to sixteen, with 28 majors and a total enrollment of more than 15,000 students. In accordance with the Republic of Tatarstan's language policies and the university's role in Tatar education, some faculties offer lectures and coursework in both Russian and Tatar.
