= Much =

Much may refer to:

- Much (TV channel), a cable network in Canada and its domestic and international spin-offs
- Much TV, a satellite cable channel in Taiwan
- Much (album), a 2001 album by Ten Shekel Shirt
- Much the Miller's Son, one of Robin Hood's Merry Men from the earliest tales
- Much, North Rhine-Westphalia, a municipality in Germany
- Hans Much (1880–1932), a German author and physician
- Rudolf Much (1862–1936), an Austrian philologist and historian
