= Fred Mutch =

Australian rules footballer

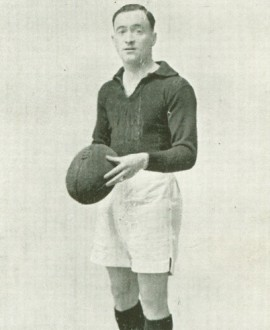
- Mutch in 1924

Personal information
- Full name: Fred Mutch
- Born: 21 November 1898
- Died: 11 November 1986 (aged 87)
- Original team: Collingwood District
- Height: 174 cm (5 ft 9 in)
- Weight: 72 kg (159 lb)

Playing career^{1}
Years	Club	Games (Goals)
1924	Collingwood	3 (0)
1926	Carlton	7 (3)
Total		10 (3)
- ^{1} Playing statistics correct to the end of 1926.

Fred Mutch (21 November 1898 – 11 November 1986) was an Australian rules footballer who played with Carlton and Collingwood in the Victorian Football League (VFL).
