= His Excellency (disambiguation) =

His Excellency may refer to:

- His or Her Excellency, an honorific style for holders of high offices of state or religion
- His Excellency (opera), an 1894 comic opera by W. S. Gilbert and F. Osmond Carr
- Her Excellency (musical), a 1949 stage musical by Manning Sherwin and Harold Purcell
- His Excellency (play), a 1950 play by Campbell Christie and Dorothy Christie
- His Excellency (1928 film), a 1928 Soviet drama film
- His Excellency (1944 film), a 1944 Swedish film
- His Excellency (1952 film), a 1952 British film
- His Excellency (1958 film), a 1958 Australian television film
- His Excellency: George Washington, a 2004 book about George Washington by Joseph J. Ellis
