= Someone at the Door =

Someone at the Door may refer to:

- Someone at the Door (play), a 1935 play by Campbell Christie and Dorothy Christie
- Someone at the Door (1936 film), a British drama film
- Someone at the Door (1950 film), a British mystery film
