= Carrington V.C. =

Carrington V.C. may refer to:

- Carrington V.C. (play), a 1953 stage play by Campbell and Dorothy Christie
- Carrington V.C. (film), a 1955 legal drama based on the play
