= Grand National Night (play) =

1945 play

- Written by: Campbell Christie; Dorothy Christie
- Original language: English
- Genre: Thriller
- Setting: Chillington, outside Liverpool

Premiere
- Date premiered: 19 November 1945
- Place premiered: New Theatre, Oxford

Grand National Night is a 1945 thriller play by the British writers Campbell Christie and Dorothy Christie. A racehorse owner quarrels and accidentally kills his wife on the evening of the Grand National.

It premiered at the New Theatre, Oxford before transferring to the Apollo Theatre in London's West End where it ran for 268 performances between 12 June 1946 and 1 February 1947. The original West End cast included Leslie Banks, Hermione Baddeley, Frederick Lloyd, Olga Edwardes, Campbell Copelin and Vincent Holman. It was revived briefly at the Theatre Royal Stratford East in 1948, lasting for 16 performances.

== Film adaptation ==
In 1953 it was made into a British film of the same title starring Nigel Patrick, Moira Lister and Beatrice Campbell.

== Bibliography ==
- Goble, Alan. The Complete Index to Literary Sources in Film. Walter de Gruyter, 1999.
- Wearing, J.P. The London Stage 1940-1949: A Calendar of Productions, Performers, and Personnel. Rowman & Littlefield, 2014.
