= Someone at the Door (1950 film) =

- Directed by: Francis Searle
- Screenplay by: A. R. Rawlinson
- Based on: the play Someone at the Door by Major Campbell Christie & Dorothy Campbell Christie
- Produced by: Anthony Hinds
- Starring: Michael Medwin; Garry Marsh; Yvonne Owen; Hugh Latimer
- Cinematography: Walter J. Harvey
- Edited by: John Ferris
- Music by: Frank Spencer
- Production company: Hammer Films
- Distributed by: Exclusive Films (UK)
- Release date: June 1950 (UK)
- Running time: 65 minutes
- Country: United Kingdom
- Language: English

Someone at the Door is a 1950 British second feature ('B') crime comedy film directed by Francis Searle and starring Michael Medwin, Garry Marsh and Yvonne Owen. It was written by A. R. Rawlinson based on the West End play of the same name by Campbell Christie and his wife Dorothy, which had previously been turned into a film in 1936. Filming commenced on Nov. 24, 1949, and it was trade shown in January, 1950, and later released in June, 1950.

== Plot ==
Journalist Ronnie Martin comes up with a scheme to boost his career by inventing a fake murder (to which he will confess) and then when the whole thing is shown to be a hoax, he plans to write a book about it and become famous. But he soon becomes embroiled in trouble when some real killings take place.

== Cast ==
- Michael Medwin as Ronnie Martin
- Garry Marsh as Kapel
- Yvonne Owen as Sally Martin
- Hugh Latimer as Bill Reid
- Danny Green as Price
- Campbell Singer as Inspector Spedding
- John Kelly as police constable

== Critical reception ==
The Monthly Film Bulletin wrote: "Comedy thriller in which sliding panels, priest-holes, ex-convicts and priceless jewels are used to conventional effect."

Kine Weekly wrote: "Most of its trappings are borrowed from the stage but thanks to brisk team work, resourced direction and authentic atmosphere, new laughs and fresh excitement are worked in the old malarky. Good, clean fun as well as a lively thriller."

Picture Show wrote: "A comedy melodrama which has the usual ingredients of a thriller but moves at a quick pace. ... Well staged and directed, the laughs alternate with the thrills."

The Radio Times Guide to Films gave the film 2/5 stars, writing: "this is Hammer hokum of the hoariest kind. There isn't a semblance of suspense ... Not even the arrival of jewel thieves at the haunted house ... can revive one's fast-fading interest. However, there is one good wheeze, during the credit sequence, when director Francis Searle reveals that the front of the old house is merely a flat piece of scenery erected in a field."

In British Sound Films: The Studio Years 1928–1959 David Quinlan rated the film as "average", writing: "Close remake of 1936 version."

Fantastic Movie Musings & Ramblings concluded, "it isn't much of a movie, but if you take it for what it is (a late-period old dark house variant based on a stage play), it has its uses. There are a few mildly amusing jokes and a couple of decent plot twists, which is more than some examples of this genre have."
