= Grand National Night =

1953 film

- The film's Press Campaign Book
- Directed by: Bob McNaught
- Written by: Val Valentine; Bob McNaught
- Based on: Grand National Night by Campbell Christie Dorothy Christie
- Produced by: Phil C. Samuel; George Minter
- Starring: Nigel Patrick; Moira Lister; Beatrice Campbell
- Cinematography: Jack Asher
- Edited by: Anne V. Coates
- Music by: John Greenwood
- Production company: Talisman-George Minter
- Distributed by: Renown Pictures; Allied Artists (US)
- Release date: 15 April 1953
- Running time: 80 minutes
- Country: United Kingdom
- Language: English

Grand National Night (also known as Wicked Wife) is a 1953 British second feature ('B') thriller film directed by Bob McNaught and starring Nigel Patrick, Moira Lister and Beatrice Campbell. It was produced by George Minter and Phil C. Samuel, and written by Val Valentine and Bob McNaught based on the 1945 play of the same title written by Campbell and Dorothy Christie.

Previous to this film version Grand National Night had been presented as a BBC Radio serial.

== Plot ==
Racehorse trainer Gerald Coates argues with his alcoholic wife Babs on the evening after his horse has won the Grand National. She attacks him with a knife and there is a struggle. Coates's butler hears the car leaving, and dead Babs is found in it the next day. Inspector Ayling investigates.

== Cast ==
- Nigel Patrick as Gerald Coates
- Moira Lister as Babs Coates
- Beatrice Campbell as Joyce Penrose
- Betty Ann Davies as Pinkie Collins
- Michael Hordern as Inspector Ayling
- Noel Purcell as Philip Balfour
- Leslie Mitchell as Jack Donovan
- Barry MacKay as Sergeant Gibson
- Colin Gordon as Buns Darling
- Gibb McLaughlin as Morton
- Richard Grayden as Chandler
- May Hallatt as Hoskyns
- George Sequira as George
- Ernest Jay as railway official
- Russell Waters as plainclothes detective
- George Rose as plainclothes detective
- Arthur Howard as hotel manager
- Edward Evans as garage attendant

== Production ==
The film was shot at Walton Studios near London. The film's sets were designed by the art director Frederick Pusey. Cinematography was by Jack Asher.

== Reception ==
The Monthly Film Bulletin wrote: "Originally Grand National Night was a stage play. Here it has been given its full quota of movement, mostly by shots of horses in training and a glimpse of the race itself. The padding has been a bit overdone, but it all helps to create the appropriate atmosphere. ... Careful direction by Bob McNaught, combined with a felicitous use of close-ups, give a certain polish to a moderate thriller."

Kine Weekly wrote: "Ingenious 'murder mystery' melodrama, smoothly adapted from the West End Success. ... Nat Gould and Edgar Wallace in one, it's a cast-iron bet for the 'populars'."

Variety wrote: "Having started life as a legit hit and later being adapted as a radio play, Grand National Night has now gone full circle and emerged as a solid, satisfying British picture. ... It has been staged in good taste and has been tautly directed to keep the suspense at a peak."

Picturegoer wrote: "Quite a good murder drama, but not an outstanding one, largely because the plot is unconvincing. ... Despite the limitations of the plot, the film is ably directed by Bob MacNaught."

Leslie Halliwell said: "Slightly dubious morally, but otherwise an adequate detective story with the outcome hinging on train timetables and the like."

The Radio Times Guide to Films gave the film 3/5 stars, writing: "Having been a hit on stage and then as a radio serial, Dorothy and Campbell Christie's play is ably brought to the screen. ..the cat-and-mouse game involving Michael Hordern (who excels as a dogged detective) is teased out with mischievous ingenuity."

In British Sound Films: The Studio Years 1928–1959 David Quinlan rated the film as "average", writing: "Middling but well-crafted thriller."
