= Carrington V.C. (play) =

1953 stage play by Campbell and Dorothy Christie

- Original programme cover
- Written by: Campbell and Dorothy Christie
- Original language: English
- Genre: Legal drama

Premiere
- Date premiered: 28 July 1953
- Place premiered: Westminster Theatre, London

Carrington VC is a 1953 stage play by husband and wife playwrights Campbell and Dorothy Christie. The production premiered on the West End in London at the Westminster Theatre. It was directed by Michael MacOwan and starred Alec Clunes, John Wood, John Garside, Allan Cuthbertson, Lionel Jeffries, and Rachel Gurney. A resounding success, the play was adapted for film in 1954.

== Original cast ==
- Sergeant Crane - Stuart Saunders
- Lieutenant-Colonel B.R. Reeve, M.C. - Philip Pearman
- Bombardier Owen - Victor Maddern
- Evans - Richard Davies
- Cook - William Abney
- Lieutenant-Colonel M.O. Henniker, O.B.E. - Allan Cuthbertson
- Major H. Maunsell - Mark Dignam
- Captain F.T. Foljambe - Robert Bishop
- Captain C.O.P. Carrington, V.C., D.S.O. - Alec Clunes
- Major J.P. Mitchell, M.C. - John Wood
- A. Tester Terry - John Garside
- Brigadier A.S. Meadmore, O.B.E. - Arnold Bell
- Colonel T.B. Huxford, M.B.E. - Willoughby Gray
- Major R.E. Panton, M.M. - Geoffrey Denys
- Major A.T.M. Broke-Smith - Lionel Jeffreys
- Captain A. Graham, W.R.A.C. - Jenny Laird
- Valerie Carrington - Rachel Gurney

== Adaptations ==
In 1954, the play was adapted for the screen by John Hunter, under the direction of Anthony Asquith and producer Teddy Baird. The film was released into theatres by Kingsley-International Pictures in 1955 and starred David Niven and Margaret Leighton.

In 1957, the play was adapted for radio and broadcast as part of the BBC's long-running Saturday Night Theatre series, with Howard Marion-Crawford as Major Carrington.

The play was adapted for television starring Richard Todd in 1959.

== Sources ==
- 1950s British plays
