= Who Goes There! (play) =

1950 play

- Original language: English
- Written by: John Dighton
- Genre: Comedy

Premiere
- Date: 11 September 1950
- Place: Theatre Royal, Windsor

Who Goes There! is a 1950 comedy play by the British writer John Dighton. The action takes place entirely around St James's Palace.

It premiered at the Theatre Royal, Windsor in September 1950. It then ran for 222 performances in London's West End between 4 April and 13 October 1951, initially at the Vaudeville Theatre before transferring to the Duke of York's Theatre. The cast included Nigel Patrick, Beatrice Campbell, Anthony Sharp, Trevor Reid, Frances Rowe and Geraldine McEwan, making her West End debut.

== Adaptation ==
In 1952 it was adapted into a film of the same title directed by Anthony Kimmins and starring Nigel Patrick, reprising his stage role, Valerie Hobson and George Cole.

== Bibliography ==
- Goble, Alan. The Complete Index to Literary Sources in Film. Walter de Gruyter, 1999.
- Wearing, J.P. The London Stage 1950-1959: A Calendar of Productions, Performers, and Personnel. Rowman & Littlefield, 2014.
