= His Excellency (1958 film) =

- Based on: play by Campbell Christie; Dorothy Christie
- Written by: Philip Albright
- Directed by: Alan Burke
- Country of origin: Australia
- Original language: English

Production
- Running time: 60 minutes

Original release
- Release: 3 December 1958

His Excellency is a 1958 Australian television film.

It was based on a play which had been previously adapted into a 1952 film of the same name.

The play itself was performed in Australia in 1953.

== Plot ==
An ex-docker is appointed governor of a British island colony.

== Cast ==
- Stewart Ginn as the Governor
- Harvey Adams
- Lola Brooks as Peggy Harrison
- Ric Hutton
- John Juson
- Eric Reiman
- John Tate
- Owen Weingott
- Jessica Noad as Lady Kirkman
- Guy Le Claire
- Al Garcia

== Production ==
It was Stewart Ginn's first appearance in a TV play. It was directed by Alan Burke who had just done Rose without a Thorn for the ABC and directed Look Back in Anger on stage for the Elizabethan Theatre Trust. Burke went on to become one of the ABC"s leading directors.

== See also ==
- List of live television plays broadcast on Australian Broadcasting Corporation (1950s)
