= His Excellency (play) =

1950 play

- Written by: Campbell Christie; Dorothy Christie
- Original language: English
- Genre: Drama

Premiere
- Date premiered: 10 April 1950
- Place premiered: Grand Theatre, Leeds

His Excellency is a 1950 play by the British writers Campbell Christie and Dorothy Christie. A former docker takes over as the British governor of an island colony in the Mediterranean.

It premiered at the Grand Theatre, Leeds before transferring to the West End where it ran for 453 performances between 23 May 1950 and 23 June 1951 initially at the Princes Theatre before moving to the Piccadilly Theatre. The play starred Eric Portman later replaced by Donald Wolfit in the title role, Clive Morton, John Wood, Ian Fleming, Arnold Bell, Sebastian Shaw, Michael Shepley and Annabel Maule.

== Adaptation ==
In 1952 it was adapted into a film of the same title directed by Robert Hamer with Portman reprising his role and a cast that also included Cecil Parker and Susan Stephen.

In 1957 it was adapted into a TV play of the same title. It was also filmed for Australian television in 1958.

== Bibliography ==
- Goble, Alan. The Complete Index to Literary Sources in Film. Walter de Gruyter, 1999.
- Wearing, J.P. The London Stage 1950-1959: A Calendar of Productions, Performers, and Personnel. Rowman & Littlefield, 2014.
