= Ernest Belcher =

Assistant general manager of the British Empire Exhibition

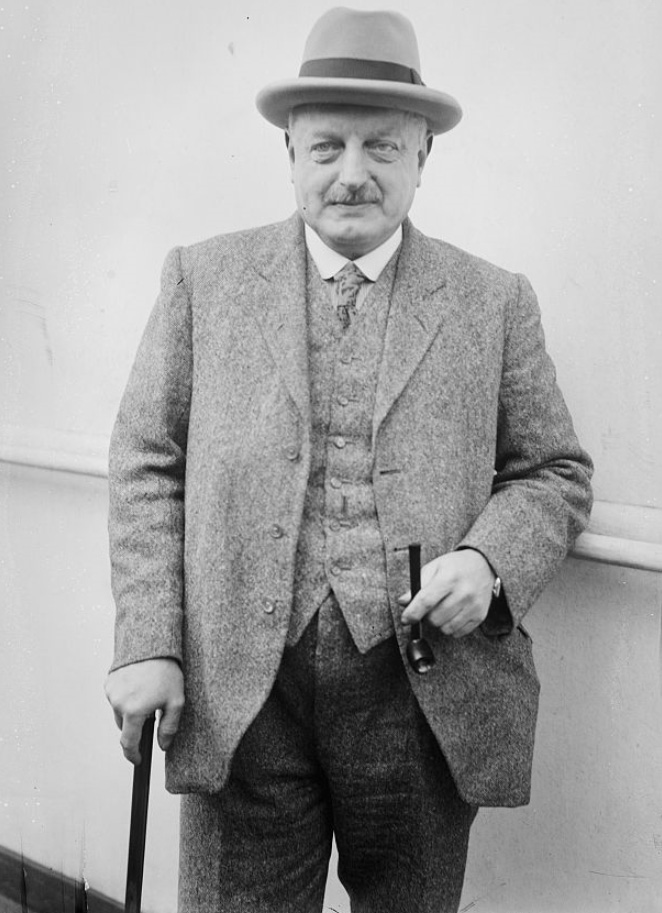
Major Ernest Albert Belcher circa 1920.

Major Ernest Albert Belcher CBE (1871–1949) was the Assistant general manager of the British Empire Exhibition which was held at Wembley in 1924 and 1925. He was leader of the 1922 tour around the world to promote this event. Agatha Christie and her husband Archie were members of this group and Christie mentions him in her notes and biographies. A 2013 book The Grand Tour: Around the World with the Queen of Mystery gives an outline of this tour and describes Major Belcher in depth.

== Early life ==
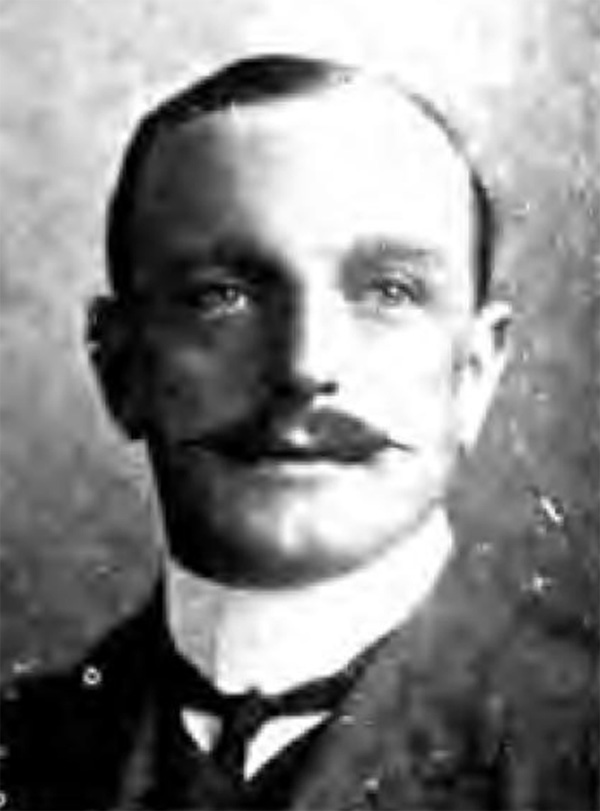
Ernest Albert Belcher circa 1900.

Ernest Albert Belcher was born in 1871 in Stoke Newington, Middlesex. His father was Albert Belcher, a clerk in the General Post Office and his mother was Maria Crossley. He was educated at Oxford University and gained a Bachelor of Arts degree with honours in history. He obtained a position as a school teacher in England for several years and then in 1902 he entered the Natal Civil Service and was assistant master at Durban High School until 1908. During this time he joined the Territorial Forces as a captain and taught the army cadets at the school.

After this, he returned to England and became a teacher at Clifton College in Bristol where he met Archie Christie who was a pupil at this time. While he was a teacher here, he commanded the cadets one of whom was Archie.

In 1912 he became the headmaster of Christ College in New Zealand and remained there for the next two years until the outbreak of the war. He returned to England and joined the military.

In 1915 Belcher was promoted from captain to major in the 9th Battalion of the Duke of Cornwall's Light Infantry. He was later asked to organise the increased production of produce, especially potatoes for the Army. In 1918 he was appointed to be Director of vegetable supplies in the Ministry of Food. He retained this position for several years after the war.

== The British Empire Exhibition Tour ==
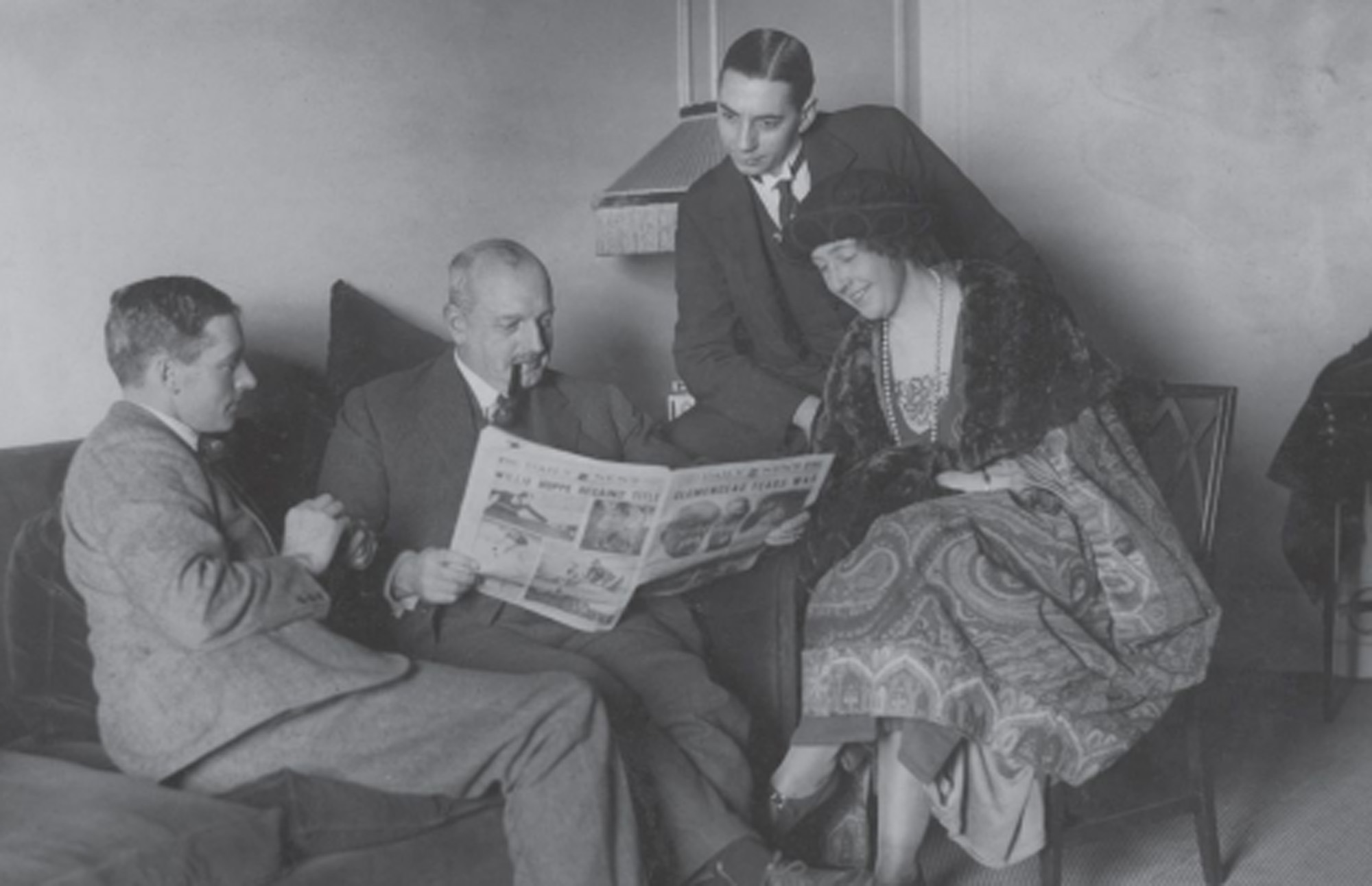
Major Belcher with Archie (far left) and Agatha Christie on the British Empire Exhibition Tour in 1922

In 1921 Belcher became Assistant general manager of the British Empire Exhibition which was to be held in 1924 and 1925. He invited Archie and Agatha Christie to join him on a tour of the Empire counties to promote the forthcoming exhibition. Christie outlined the tour in her autobiography and letters. She describes Belcher as an insufferable man who was prone to temper tantrums. A good description of him is given in a recent book.

"Belcher's presence dominated the tour, to an extent that Agatha could not have imagined, that she found insufferable at the time and comical in retrospect. He was a very modern type, for all his old-school-tie manner. He would have thrived on quangos or talking impressive-sounding nonsense on television; he was one of nature's politicians, although not from any sense of public duty: again, his sense of duty was directed towards his own advancement."

Christie also felt that it was difficult to know whether to believe his stories or not. In her autobiography she said:

"He was a man with terrific powers of bluff. He had, according to his own story, bluffed himself into the position of Controller of Potatoes during the war. How much of Belcher's stories was invented and how much true, we never knew."

Christie's assessment of Belcher seems to have been supported by an incident that happened in 1915, seven years before the tour when Belcher was invited as part of a group to visit former United States President Theodore Roosevelt at his home for a very short informal social gathering. Belcher wrote up the event as if Roosevelt had given him an exclusive interview on foreign policy and gave it to the London Morning Post and several other newspapers. The article was a complete fabrication of what Roosevelt had said and was so bad that the former President issued a statement to The New York Times rebutting the whole event.

== Major Belcher's Marriage ==
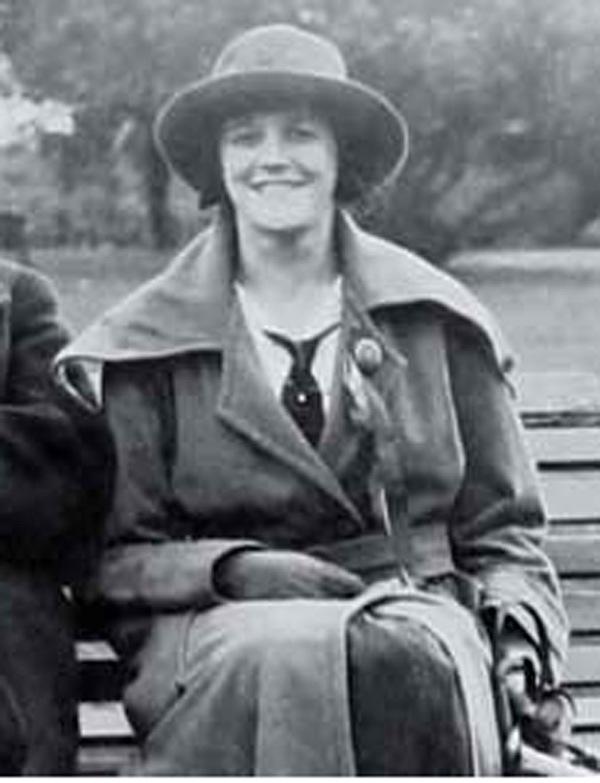
Gladys Greenwood in 1922 aged 18.

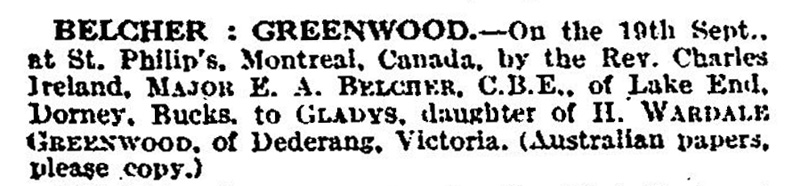
Marriage Notice of Major Belcher and Gladys Greenwood in 1926.

Belcher was 51 and unmarried when he led the British Empire Tour. During his visit to Australia he needed some work done. One of the officials Harold Greenwood suggested that his daughter Gladys Greenwood could act as Belcher's personal secretary while he was in Australia.

After Belcher returned to England at the end of 1922, his engagement to Gladys was announced in The Times in January 1923. At this time he lived at The Mill House at Clewer near Dorney where the Christies visited him occasionally. Gladys still lived in Australia with her parents. In 1925 Belcher moved to Lake End House in Dorney, which was a large Queen Anne house surrounded by five acres.

In 1926 Belcher went to Canada on business and while he was there Gladys travelled from Australia to Vancouver on the ship Aorangi to meet him. They were married in Montreal in September 1926. The Times marriage notice is shown. Shortly after they returned to England and lived for some time in Dorney. They then moved to an apartment in Clifton Court London in about 1930 and then to Rodney Court. In about 1935 the couple divorced. Two years later Gladys married Sydney Gould.

After the divorce Belcher remained in Rodney Court London for several years. He then moved to an apartment in Clive Court. He was a member of the Oxford and Cambridge Club and spent a great deal of his time there. He died at Clive Court London in 1949 aged 78.
