= Last Holiday (1950 film) =

Henry Cass film starring Alec Guinness

- Alec Guinness as George Bird and Helen Cherry as Miss Mellows
- Directed by: Henry Cass
- Written by: J. B. Priestley
- Produced by: Associated British Picture; Watergate Films; Stephen Mitchell; A. D. Peters; J. B. Priestley
- Starring: Alec Guinness; Beatrice Campbell; Kay Walsh; Bernard Lee; Wilfrid Hyde-White; Helen Cherry; Jean Colin; Muriel George; Sid James
- Cinematography: Ray Elton
- Edited by: Monica Kimick
- Music by: Francis Chagrin
- Production companies: Warner Bros.; Welwyn Studios
- Distributed by: Warner Bros.; Associated British-Pathé, Ltd.
- Release date: 3 May 1950
- Running time: 89 min
- Country: United Kingdom
- Language: English
- Box office: £109,084 (UK)

Last Holiday is a 1950 British black comedy film directed by Henry Cass and starring Alec Guinness. It was written and co-produced by J. B. Priestley and co-written by an uncredited J. Lee Thompson.

The film's narrative revolves around salesman George Bird. During a routine visit to his physician, he is told that he has a terminal disease and only a short time to live. He decides to spend his final days in an expensive hotel. Once there, he acquires friends and a love interest who eventually learn of his plight.

== Synopsis ==
George Bird, an unassuming salesman of agricultural implements, visits a physician for a routine check-up and is told he has Lampington's disease, a recently identified condition which allows him only a few weeks to live. He accepts the doctor's advice to take his savings and enjoy himself in the little time left to him.

A bachelor with no family or friends, Bird decides to spend his last days among the elite clientele of an upmarket residential hotel at the fictional seaside resort of Pinebourne. By chance, a salesman in a used clothing store has acquired two suitcases, covered with international labels. The cases are full of a deceased Lord's bespoke tailored wardrobe that perfectly fits Bird. Bird acquires the wardrobe and luggage and takes the salesman's advice to shave off his moustache to give him the appearance of a wealthy gentleman.

Bird's unassuming attitude generates a great deal of interest among the hotel's residents. He is seen as an enigma to be solved, with wild speculations offered as to his identity and possible noble lineage. The hotel's housekeeper, Mrs Poole, guesses the truth that Bird is an ordinary man, and he confides in her, but not his condition. Bird quickly acquires friends and influence, falls in love (possibly for the first time in his life), sets wrongs to right, and is offered lucrative business opportunities. But these successes only serve to make him reflect on the irony that he will have no time to enjoy them.

During a strike by the hotel's staff, Bird comes into contact with Sir Trevor Lampington, the doctor after whom Lampington's disease was named. He insists that Bird cannot possibly have the disease as he has no symptoms, and contacts the clinic to berate them for being more busy than accurate in their diagnoses. Just as the hospital discovers its error, Bird enters and it is confirmed that he indeed was given the wrong diagnosis. Overjoyed, he is ready to begin life afresh with his new sweetheart, friends and business opportunities.

In a twist ending, however, he is killed in a car accident on the way back to the hotel. He takes a shortcut through the sleepy village of Fallow End, where a man has just set his sick old dog down on the road to have a "last walk round" before taking him to be put to sleep. Swerving to avoid the dog, Bird runs head-on into a lorry. Meanwhile, the hotel guests, having learned the truth about Bird's identity and misdiagnosis, are irritated that he has not appeared for a dinner celebrating his good news. As the evening wears on, most of them express their doubts about him, and one of them, Bellinghurst, concludes the meal with an arrogant, long-winded "toast" to Bird, who is presumably 'back in his place.'

In hospital, resigned to his fate, Bird tells a nurse to "give his love" to all his friends at the hotel. Mrs Poole silences Bellinghurst and shames the rest with the news that Mr Bird is dead.

== Cast ==
- Alec Guinness as George Bird
- Beatrice Campbell as Sheila Rockingham
- Kay Walsh as Mrs Poole
- Coco Aslan as Gambini
- Jean Colin as Daisy Clarence
- Muriel George as Lady Oswington
- Brian Worth as Derek Rockingham
- Esma Cannon as Miss Fox
- Bernard Lee as Inspector Wilton
- Sid James as Joe Clarence
- Campbell Cotts as Bellinghurst
- Moultrie Kelsall as Sir Robert Kyle
- Mme. Kirkwood-Hackett as Miss Hatfield
- Wilfrid Hyde-White as Chalfont
- Eric Maturin as Wrexham
- Helen Cherry as Miss Mellows
- Harry Hutchinson as Michael (The Waiter)
- Hal Osmond as Trade Union Man
- Brian Oulton as Prescott
- Ernest Thesiger as Sir Trevor Lampington
- Heather Wilde as Maggie (The Maid)
- Ronald Simpson as Dr Pevensey
- Arthur Howard as Burden
- Meier Tzelniker as Baltin
- Leslie Weston as William (The Waiter)
- Lockwood West as Dinsdale
- David McCallum as Blind Fiddler

== Production ==
The film was produced at Welwyn Studios with location shots at Luton, Bedfordshire, shopping parade, and The Rosetor Hotel (now demolished), in Torquay, Devon.

== Reception ==
The Monthly Film Bulletin wrote: "In the principal part Alec Guinness gives an extremely clever performance; the other acting varies from rather good (Kay Walsh) to very bad (Wilfred Hyde White). The shortcomings of the script are emphasised, and its virtues minimised by Henry Cass' direction, which is slow and unimaginative."

Kine Weekly wrote: "The picture is immenselys readable fiction picturised with showmanship and intelligence. J. B. Priestley not only knows how to draw characters that live and breathe, but, even more important, the way to manipudate them on paper, on the stage and on the screen. The 'doomed' George is the central figure here, and the others waltz around the 'maypole' in circumstances that enable the author to make relevant cracks at all sections of society. Observant, humorous and human, its colourful and novel mosaic is first-class entertainment, even though it ends on a slightly forced note of tragedy."

Variety wrote: "In the main, dialog is snappy and pungent and despite the impending tragedy, there is a nice light-heartedness of treatment. ...The principal part is a field day for Guinness, who turns in another sure, polished performance. Chief femme characters are warmly played by Kay Walsh and Beatrice Campbell ... Many of the hotel residents are more caricatures than characters, but together they make a contribution to the comedy and drama of the story."

Upon its release in New York City in November 1950, Bosley Crowther called it an "amusing and poignant little picture" that is "simple and modest in structure but delightfully rich in character."

In Realism and Tinsel: Cinema and Society in Britain 1939–48, critic Robert Murphy asserted that Last Holiday was not as good as it should have been, given the excellent performances by Guinness, Walsh and James. In particular he described the film's production values as "shabby" and singled out Priestley's trick ending for even harsher criticism, calling it "disastrously inappropriate."

In The Radio Times Guide to Films, David Parkinson gave the film 3/5 stars, writing: "Alec Guinness holds centre stage in this amiable ensemble affair ... It's the supporting cast, however, that gives the film the animated gentility that is so achingly British. Kay Walsh, Wilfrid Hyde White, Sid James and Ernest Thesiger stand out among the eccentrics and everyday folk who populate J B Priestley's heart-warming script. Corny, perhaps, but nice."

== Other releases and versions ==
The film was released on VHS in 1994, and again in 2000, by Homevision. It was released in DVD format by Janus Films and The Criterion Collection under licence from Studio Canal in June 2009, but was dropped from their catalogues in 2011.

Last Holiday of 2006 was a loose remake, starring Queen Latifah as Georgia Byrd, LL Cool J, Timothy Hutton, Alicia Witt, and Gérard Depardieu.

== See also ==
- The Blue Castle, a novel with a similar plot
- Joe Versus the Volcano, another film with a similar premise
