= The Hangman Waits =

- DVD cover
- Directed by: A. Barr-Smith
- Written by: A. Barr-Smith
- Produced by: A. Barr-Smith
- Starring: Beatrice Campbell; John Turnbull
- Cinematography: Denys Coop
- Edited by: Bunch Dixon-Spain
- Music by: Albert Ferber
- Production company: Five Star Films
- Distributed by: Butcher's Film Service
- Release date: 25 August 1947
- Running time: 63 minutes
- Country: United Kingdom
- Language: English

The Hangman Waits is a 1947 British second feature ('B') thriller film written, directed and produced by A. Barr Smith, starring Beatrice Campbell and John Turnbull. Shot documentary-style, the film tells the story of a murderer who comes to a grisly end.

== Plot ==
A cinema organist murders an usherette, leaving the dismembered remains of her body in a trunk at London's Victoria Station. The News of the World newspaper promotes a search to bring the murderer to justice. While on the run, he kills a second time. Finally he throws himself to his death from the top storey of the newspaper's building.

== Cast ==
- John Turnbull as Inspector
- Beatrice Campbell as usherette
- Hylton Allen as Night Editor, Daily Clarion
- Anthony Baird as Sinclair
- Vi Kaley as old woman in crowd outside Queens Theatre (as Vi Kailey)
- John Le Mesurier as newspaper worker (uncredited)

== Critical reception ==
The Monthly Film Bulletin wrote: "The film affords an interesting if sordid glimpse into the workings of crime reportage. Attempts are made at building up an atmosphere of tension by a series of dramatic effects, some imaginative, some incongruous, which punctuate the tale from start to finish. More successful are scenes like those in the newspaper office, at the station or in the streets of London, which are free at least from pretentious lights and shadows. The director is adequately served by a large cast."

In British Sound Films: The Studio Years 1928–1959 David Quinlan rated the film as "average", writing: "Documentary-style study of the pursuit of a killer. Burly character actor John Turnbull's only role in films."

Chibnall and McFarlane in The British 'B' Film called the film: "A gruesome slice of Grand Guignol", adding: "Somewhat unconvincingly its distributors, Butcher's, tried to emphasise the film's factual and educational credentials: 'An absorbing and thrilling exposition of Newspaper life showing how crime news is collected and presented in its various stages,' claimed the poster. Reviewers were less convinced and could recommend this only to the unsophisticated."

== Releases ==
The film was released on DVD by Renown Pictures in 2011.
