= His Excellency (1952 film) =

- Directed by: Robert Hamer
- Written by: Robert Hamer; W. P. Lipscomb
- Based on: His Excellency by Dorothy Christie & Campbell Christie
- Produced by: Michael Truman
- Starring: Eric Portman; Cecil Parker; Helen Cherry
- Cinematography: Douglas Slocombe
- Edited by: Seth Holt
- Music by: Ernest Irving
- Production company: Ealing Studios
- Distributed by: General Film Distributors
- Release date: January 10, 1952 (UK)
- Running time: 82 minutes
- Country: United Kingdom
- Language: English
- Box office: £109,000

His Excellency is a 1952 British comedy drama film directed by Robert Hamer and starring Eric Portman, Cecil Parker, Helen Cherry and Susan Stephen. It follows a blunt Yorkshireman and former trade union leader, who is sent to take over as Governor of a British-ruled island in the Mediterranean. It was based on the 1950 play of the same title by Dorothy Christie and Campbell Christie. The play was also filmed for Australian television in 1958.

The film was produced at Ealing Studios under the general oversight of Michael Balcon. The sets were designed by the art director Jim Morahan. Location shooting took place in Sicily around Palermo. The film was scored by Ernest Irving who incorporated a number of themes by Handel.

== Cast ==
- Eric Portman as George Harrison
- Cecil Parker as Sir James Kirkman
- Helen Cherry as Lady Kirkman
- Susan Stephen as Peggy Harrison
- Edward Chapman as the Admiral
- Clive Morton as General Officer Commanding
- Alec Mango as Jackie
- Geoffrey Keen as Morellos
- John Salew as Fernando
- Robin Bailey as Charles
- Eric Pohlmann as Dobrieda
- Paul Demel as Chef
- Elspeth March as Mrs Fernando
- Howard Marion-Crawford as Tea shop proprietor
- Henry B. Longhurst as Lord Kynaston
- Gerard Heinz as Prime Minister
- Barbara Leake as Woman in Tea Shop
- Barbara Cavan as Woman in Tea Shop
- Basil Dignam as Security Officer
- Laurence Naismith as First Soldier
- Victor Maddern as Second Soldier

== Critical reception ==
Britmovie quoted George Perry from his book Forever Ealing, "His Excellency retains a stagebound atmosphere. Its other great fault lies in the way it wastes the theme’s potential in a glib and artificial treatment. At times the film is like an Ealing comedy that got away, with familiar stereotypes such as the ladies who form the clientele of the ‘Old Tea Shoppe’, and the governor's staff. The governor himself tends towards caricature, retaining a shirt sleeves and braces attitude akin to a trade-union rabble rouser long after he should have made a transition to the respectability demanded by his appointment... Robert Hamer returned to Ealing specially to make this film, but compared with the promise of his earlier work it is disappointing and marks the beginning of his decline."
