= Archie Christie =

Agatha Christie's first husband

Colonel Archie Christie CMG DSO
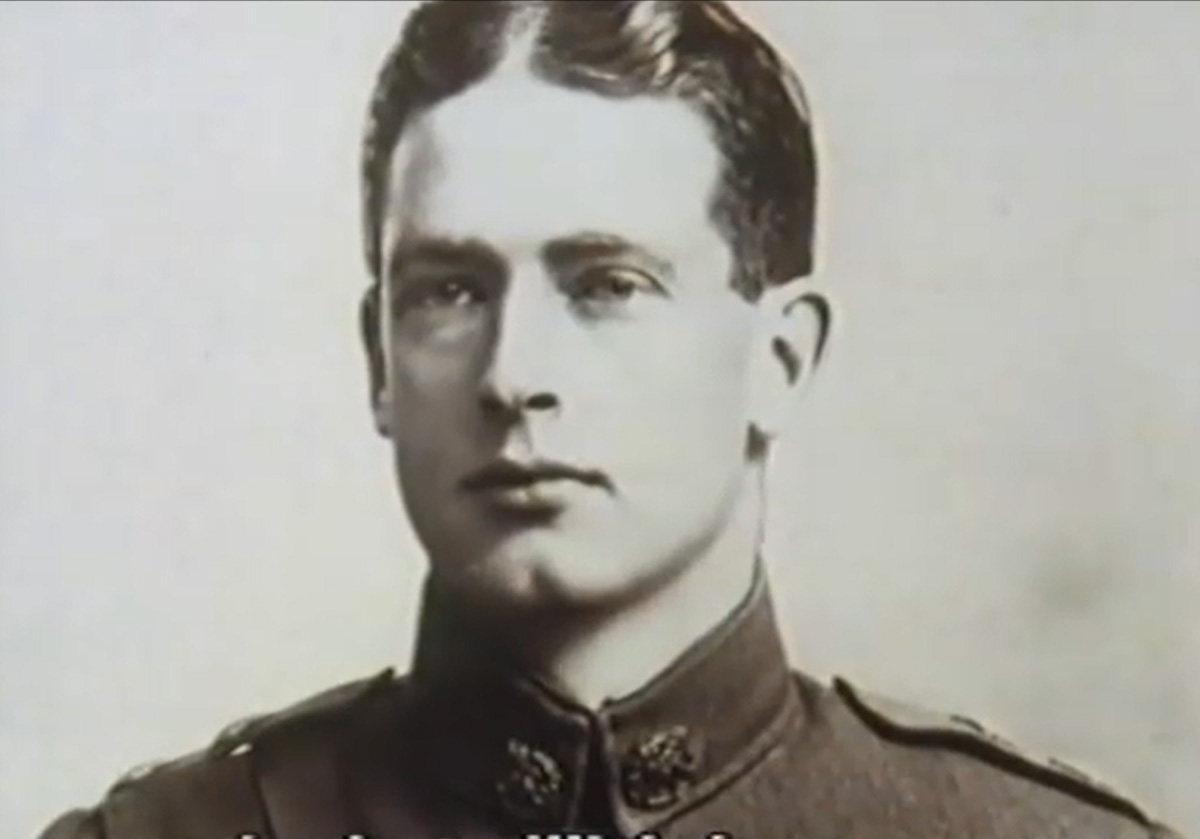
- Christie in 1915
- Born: 30 September 1889; Peshawar, British Raj (modern day Pakistan)
- Died: 20 December 1962 (aged 73); Godalming, England
- Spouse: Agatha Christie (m. 1914; div. 1928) Nancy Neele (m. 1928; died 1958)
- Children: 2, including Rosalind Hicks
- Relatives: Campbell Christie (brother)

Colonel Archibald Christie CMG DSO (30 September 1889 – 20 December 1962) was a British businessman and military officer. He was the first husband of mystery writer Dame Agatha Christie; they married in 1914 and divorced in 1928. They separated in 1927 after a major rift due to his infidelity and obtained a divorce the following year. During that period Agatha wrote some of her most renowned detective novels. Shortly after the divorce, Christie married Nancy Neele, and the couple lived quietly for the rest of their lives. Christie became a successful businessman and was invited to be on the board of directors of several major companies.

== Early life ==
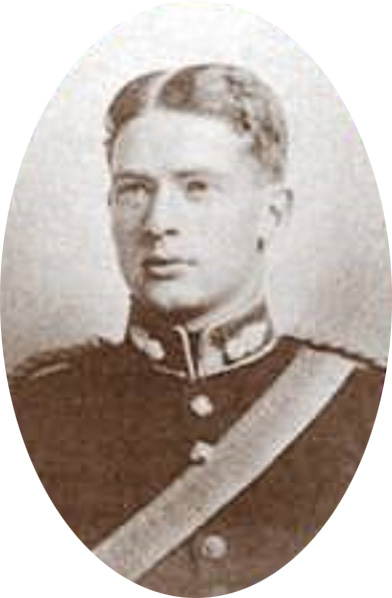
Archie Christie, 1909, after graduating from the Royal Military Academy

Archibald Christie was born in 1889 in Peshawar in The British Raj, now Pakistan. His father, also called Archibald Christie, was in the Indian Civil Service. It is said that he was a judge; however, his death notice in The Law Times journal described him as a barrister. His mother was Ellen Ruth "Peg" Coates, who is often mentioned in her daughter-in-law (Agatha)'s autobiography. Peg was born in Portumna, Ireland in 1862. Her father was Dr Samuel Coates (died 1879). Her brother was in the Indian Medical Service, and she was staying with him when she met Archibald Christie (senior), who was thirteen years older than she was. In 1888, at the age of 26, she married him. The couple had two sons, Archie and Campbell.

Christie was sent to England to be educated. He was a boarder at Hillside Boys School in Godalming for some years. In 1901, when Christie was 11, his father died. Two years later, Peg Christie married William Hemsley, a schoolteacher at Clifton College, Bristol, and Christie moved there to complete his education.

After he left school, he passed the entrance exam to the Royal Military Academy, Woolwich, and, in 1909, was commissioned as a second lieutenant in the Royal Regiment of Artillery. He then joined the 138th Battery Royal Field Artillery. He wanted to be a pilot so he paid for private lessons in the Bristol Flying School at Brooklands and gained his aviators' certificate on 12 July 1912. He met Agatha Miller when he was invited to a ball on 12 October 1912 by Lady Clifford at her grand home Ugbrooke House in Chudleigh. A description of her meeting with Christie is given by Agatha in her autobiography:

Christie came my way quite soon in the dance. He was a tall, fair young man, with crisp curly hair, a rather interesting nose, turned up not down, and a great air of careless confidence about him. He was introduced to me, asked for a couple of dances, and said that his friend Griffiths had told him to look out for me. We got on together very well; he danced splendidly and I danced again several more times with him. I enjoyed the evening thoroughly.

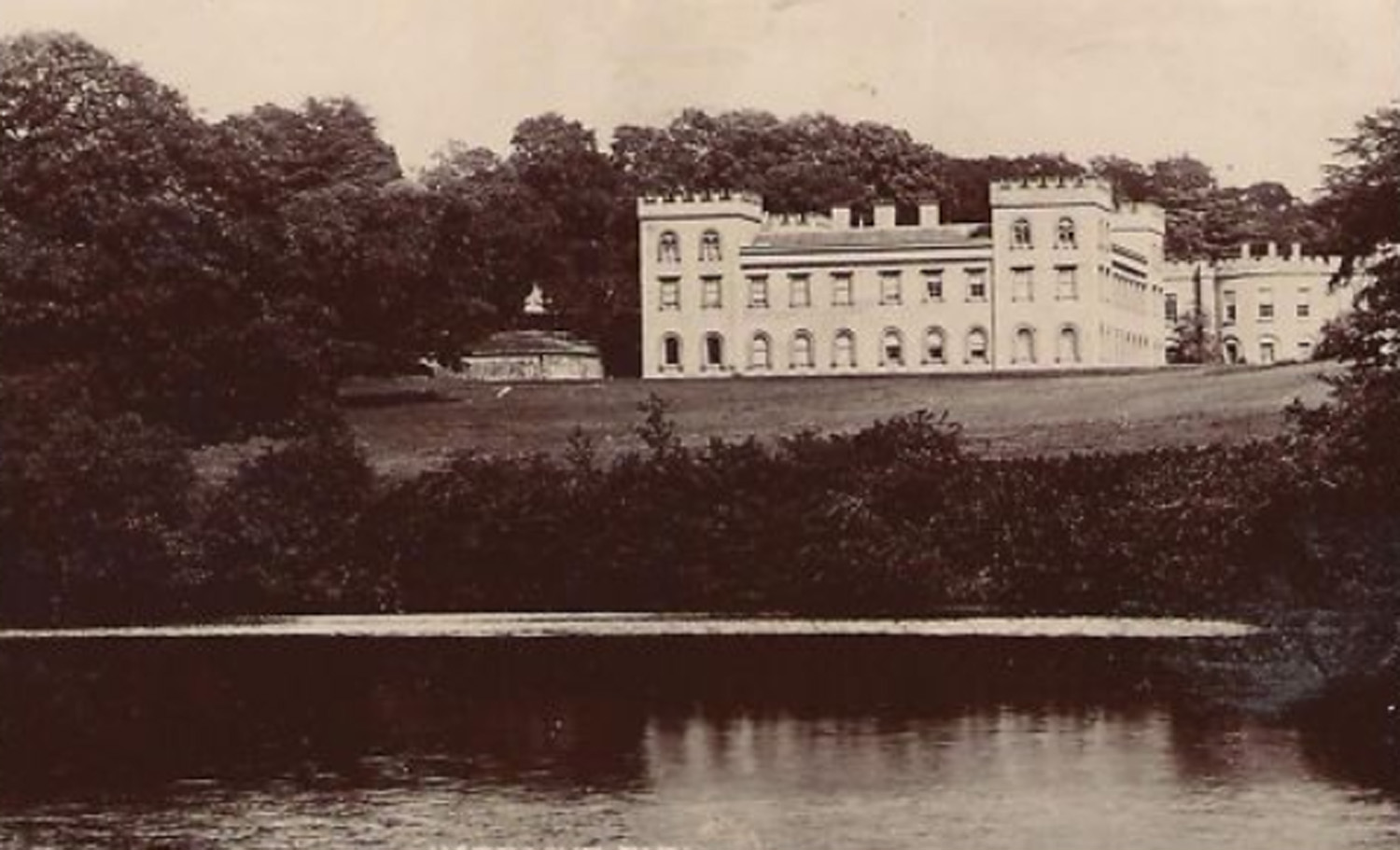
Ugbrooke House at about the time that the ball was held

Promoted to lieutenant in 1912, Christie was seconded to the Royal Flying Corps in April 1913. He became a flying officer with No. 3 Squadron based at Larkhill. Unable to continue flying because of sinus problems, he became a transport officer, also in the Royal Flying Corps.

On Christmas Eve 1914, shortly after the outbreak of World War I, Christie and Agatha were married at Emmanuel Church, Clifton, Bristol, close to the home of his parents. Christie was progressively promoted during the war until he became colonel. He was mentioned in despatches five times; and, at the end of the war, he received a DSO and a CMG.

== Life with Agatha Christie ==
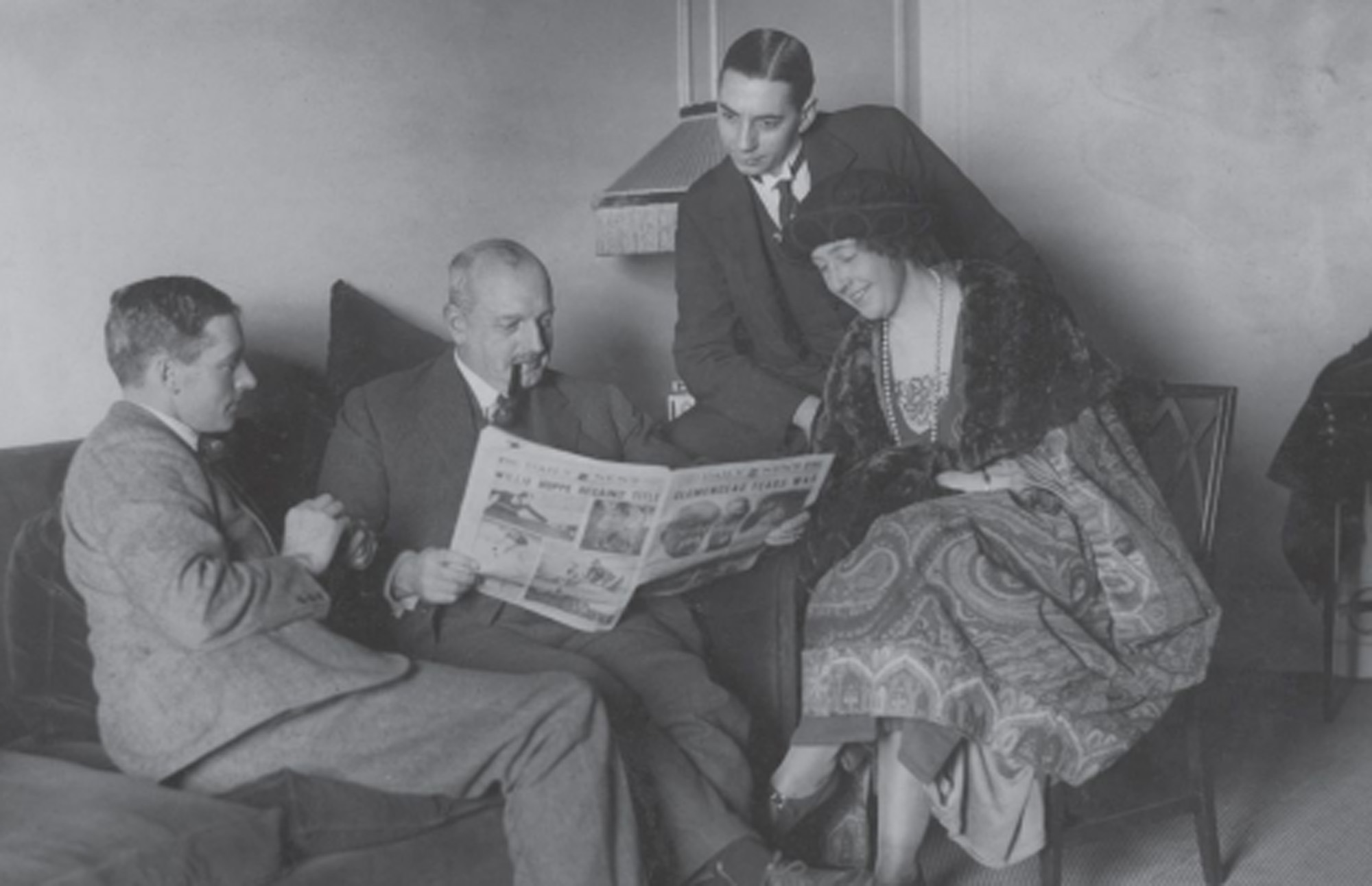
The British Empire Exhibition Tour. From left to right – Archie Christie, Major Belcher, Mr Bates (secretary) and Agatha.

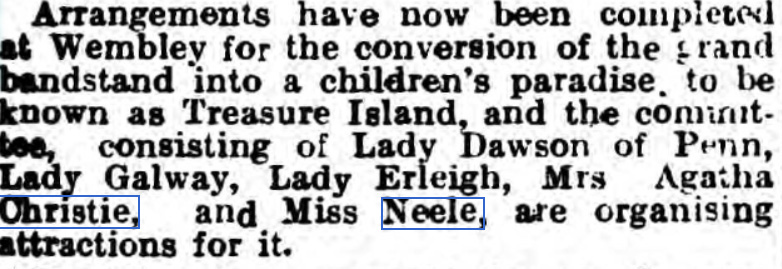
The Committee on which Agatha and Nancy Neele were both members

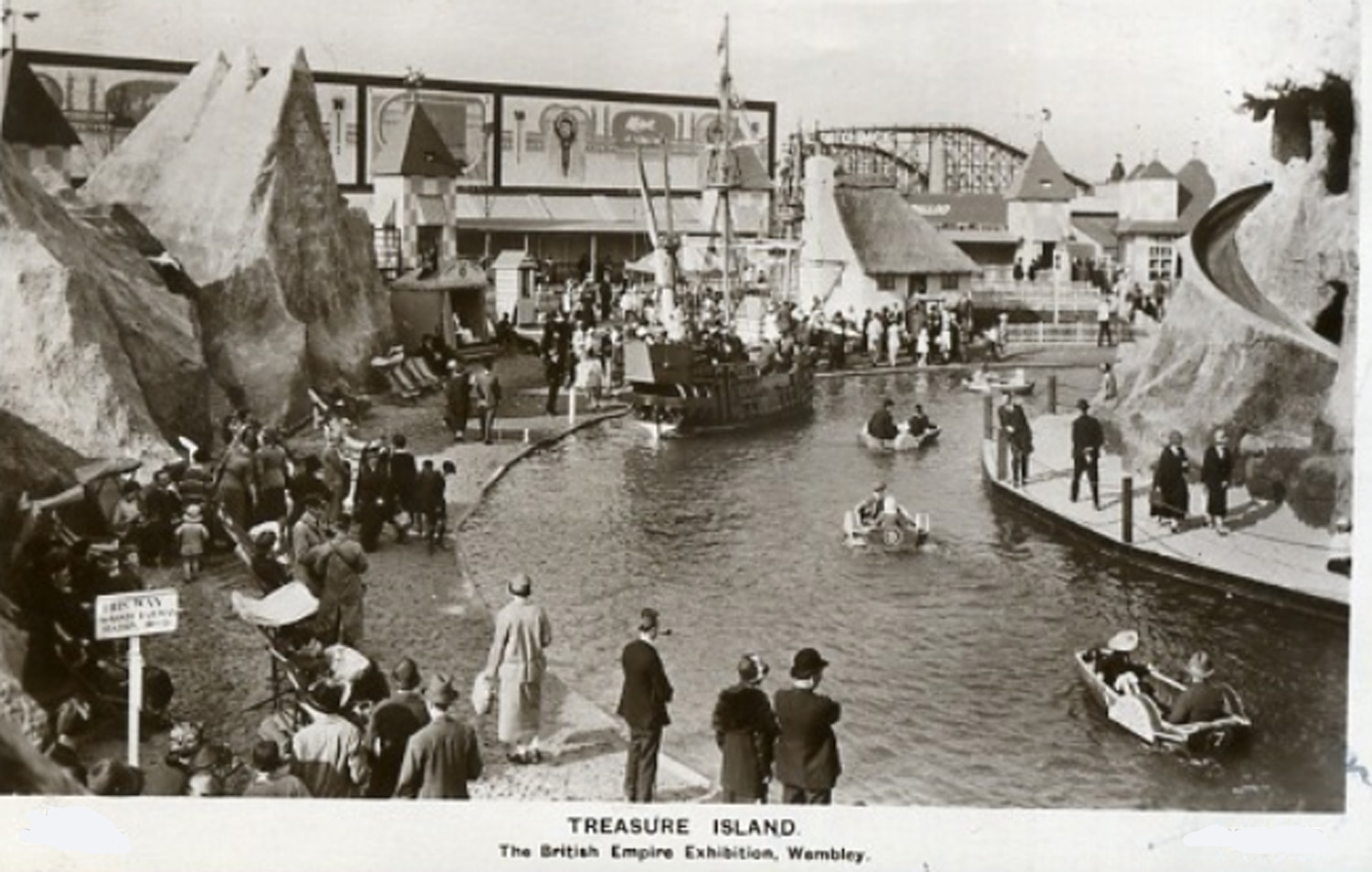
The Treasure Island Exhibit that was organised by Agatha Christie and Nancy Neele

After the war, Christie and Agatha took a flat in Northwick Terrace in London for a short time. Their only child, Rosalind Margaret Clarissa, was born in Agatha's childhood home Ashfield in Torquay in 1919. Soon after this, they found a larger flat in Addison Mansions, London.

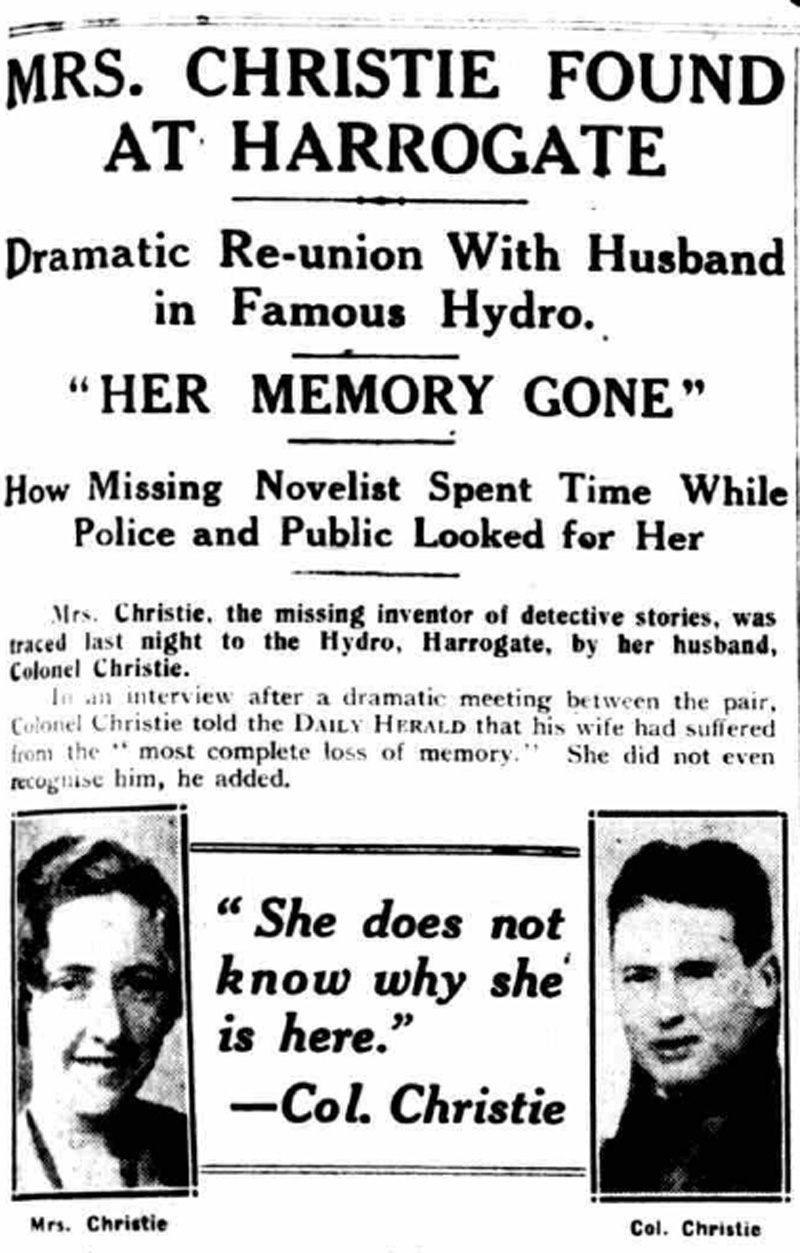
Headline about Agatha's discovery 1926.

Christie left the military and took a job in the Imperial and Foreign Corporation. He remained there until 1922 when he was offered a position by his father's former colleague Major Ernest Belcher as financial adviser in the British Empire Exhibition Tour. The purpose of the tour was to promote the forthcoming British Empire Exhibition, which was to be held at Wembley in 1924 and 1925. The tour departed in January 1922 and returned 10 months later. During this time, Christie and Agatha visited many places around the world and came to know Major Ernest Belcher, who led the tour and organised many parts of the Wembley Exhibition.

After they returned from the tour, Christie found a job in the city and later moved to Austral Development, which established him in the world of finance. He started to play golf and was elected to the Sunningdale Golf Club. He spent many of his weekends there while Agatha worked on her novels in their London flat. Christie wanted to live in Sunningdale so, in 1924, they moved to a flat called Scotswood, where they lived for two years.

At the beginning of 1925, Agatha was invited to participate in a committee to design and organise a children's section of the 1925 British Empire Exhibition in Wembley. Another friend of Belcher's, Nancy Neele, was also invited to be a member of the Committee; Neele would later become Christie's mistress and second wife. The committee on which both Agatha and Nancy sat designed and organised the Children's Paradise section of the Wembley Exhibition which contained Treasure Island as its centrepiece. It was a substantial contribution to the event as The Times outlined its features in-depth and gave the names of the committee. It was a very successful part of the Exhibition as, in the following year, the Treasure Island feature was exported to the United States, where it was lauded as "the greatest amusement feature at the Sesquicentennial Exposition in Philadelphia, Pennsylvania".

At the beginning of 1926, Christie and Agatha jointly bought a large house in Sunningdale they called "Styles". In April of that year, Agatha's mother, Clarissa Miller, died, and for several months, she moved back to her childhood home in Ashfield to sort and pack her mother's belongings. In August, Christie came to see her at Ashfield and told her he wanted a divorce as he had fallen in love with Neele. On 3 December 1926, Agatha left their home in Styles and when she did not return, Archie reported her missing. A major police hunt was undertaken, and Christie was questioned by the police. Agatha was located 10 days later at the Swan Hydropathic Hotel (now the Old Swan Hotel) in Harrogate, Yorkshire, registered as Mrs Teresa Neele.

Christie was asked to go to the hotel to identify his wife. She apparently did not recognise him until later when she was recovering at Abney Hall, her sister's house. Christie issued a statement to the press that his wife was suffering from a nervous disorder and that she had complete loss of memory. The 1979 dramatic film Agatha was based on this event with Agatha and Archie portrayed by Vanessa Redgrave and Timothy Dalton. After this, the couple separated. Agatha went to live in a flat in London, and Christie remained at Styles so that he could sell it. In 1928, Christie married Nancy Neele at St George's, Hanover Square, with just a few close friends present at the ceremony.

== Nancy Neele ==
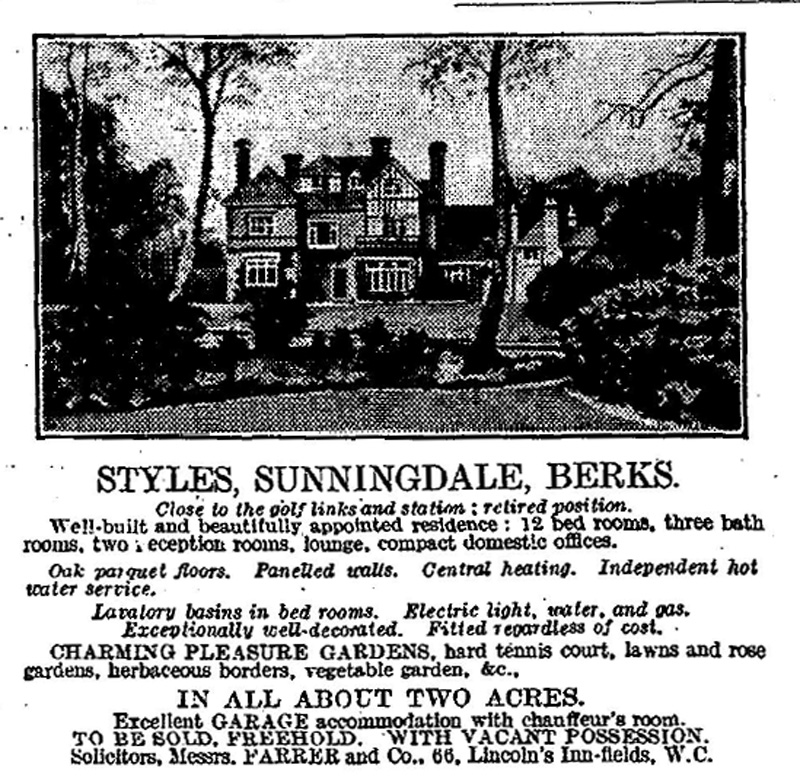
Advertisement placed by Christie for the sale of Styles in 1927

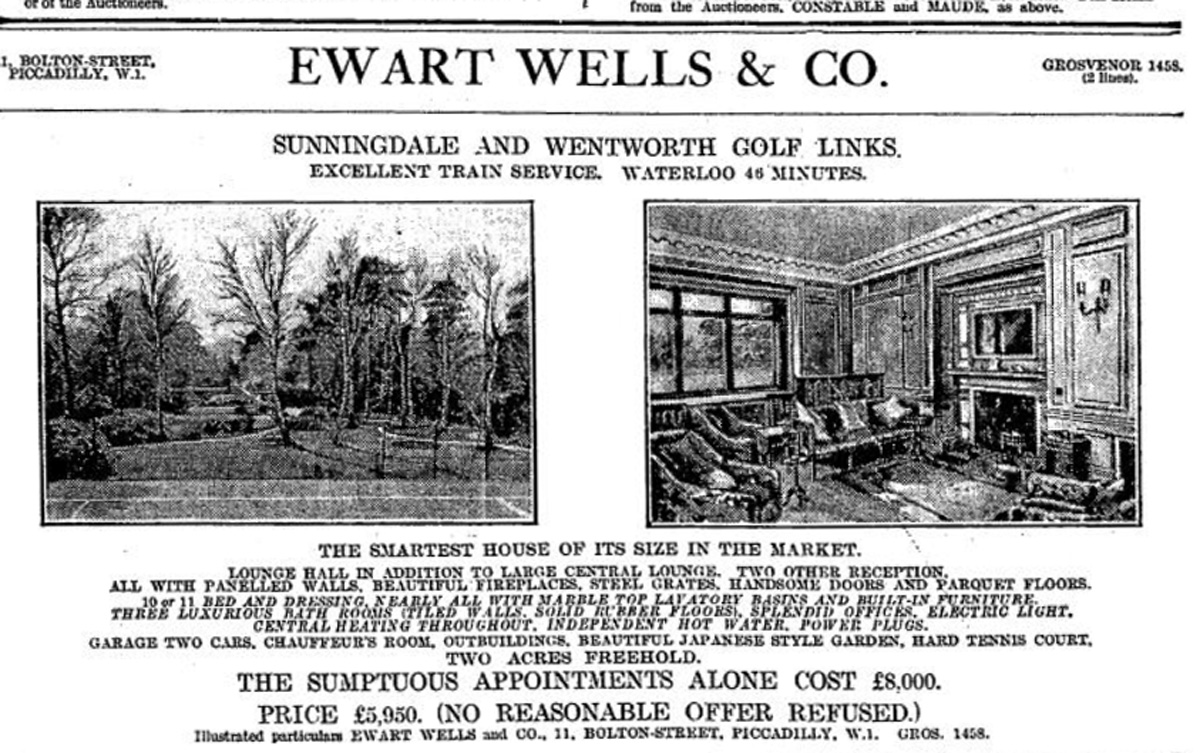
Advertisement placed by Christie for the sale of Styles in 1928

Nancy Neele was 10 years younger than Christie. She was born in 1899 to middle-class parents in Stockport, Cheshire. Her father, Charles Woodward Neele, was the Chief Electrical Engineer to the Great Central Railway. Her mother, Mabel Lily Fraser, came from a cultured family where music dominated. She was one of five sisters who played orchestral music, and they were described by one newspaper as showing "a proficiency in handling their instruments that enables them to perform with grace and ease the most exacting and high class music".

During Nancy's childhood, her family moved to a house called Rheola in Croxley Green. After she left school, Nancy completed a course at the Triangle Secretarial College in London and obtained a position as a clerk in the Imperial Continental Gas Association. Soon after she started there, she was joined by Madge Fox, her friend from the college. In 1925, Madge married Frank Henry James, and the couple lived in Hurtmore Cottage near Godalming. It was here that Christie saw Nancy at house parties on weekends before his divorce from Agatha. After their marriage in 1928, Archie and Nancy Christie lived in a London flat at 84 Avenue Road (NW8). They had one son, Archibald (born 1930). Christie stayed in contact with Rosalind, his daughter from his first marriage. In an interview that was published in The Times, Rosalind Hicks made the following comments about her father's second marriage: "Eventually my father married Nancy Neele, and they lived happily together until she died. I saw him quite often, and we always liked and understood one another."

Christie was a director on the boards of several financial and investment companies. In 1949, he was appointed to the board of the Rank Organisation.

The couple lived in their London flat until about 1939 when they moved to a large country house near Godalming called Juniper Hill on Hydon Heath. Christie continued to play golf at Sunningdale Golf Club. Nancy died in 1958 at the age of 58, and Christie died four years later.
