= Morning Departure =

- Theatrical poster
- Directed by: Roy Ward Baker
- Screenplay by: W.E. Fairchild
- Based on: the stage play Morning Departure by Kenneth Woollard
- Produced by: Jay Lewis
- Starring: John Mills; Richard Attenborough; Bernard Lee; Kenneth More; Nigel Patrick; George Cole
- Cinematography: Desmond Dickinson
- Edited by: Alan Osbiston
- Production company: Jay Lewis Productions
- Distributed by: GFD
- Release dates: 21 February 1950 (UK); 3 November 1950 (AUS); 13 January 1951 (US)
- Running time: 102 min
- Country: United Kingdom
- Language: English
- Budget: £105,000 or £127,500
- Box office: £190,000

Morning Departure (released as Operation Disaster in the United States) is a 1950 British naval drama film about life aboard a sunken submarine, directed by Roy Ward Baker, and starring John Mills and Richard Attenborough. It was written by W. E. C. Fairchild based on the 1940 stage play of the same name by Kenneth Woollard, which had also been shown as a live TV play by the BBC in 1946 and 1948.

== Plot ==
The British submarine HMS Trojan is out on a routine exercise to test its new snorkel mast. She encounters an unrecovered Second World War magnetic mine. When she dives, the mine is set off and blows off the bow of the submarine. The after section floods from the displaced snorkel mast, killing the 53 crewmen in the bow and stern sections. She settles to the bottom leaving twelve crew members alive amidships, saved by the watertight doors which were closed by order of the captain when he realised the imminent danger.

When the shore base becomes aware that Trojan is overdue, surface rescue vessels are sent out to investigate. The captain of the submarine, Lieutenant Commander Peter Armstrong, expels a quantity of oil, which rises to the surface and shows their position. Following standard escape procedure, a diver is sent down with an air line, while everyone prepares for the rescue. Armstrong selects the first four for release; they escape through the gun hatch and are picked up on the surface. The eight remaining crew assume there are plenty of breathing sets for them all to escape. However, the captain discovers that all but four have been destroyed in the blast. This means four will be trapped until a full salvage operation can be carried out, which may take a week or more.

Armstrong deals from a pack of cards to decide who goes and who remains. The cook, A/B Higgins, and the first lieutenant, Lieutenant Manson, get low cards. Three get high cards, there is a tie between Stoker Snipe and E.R.A. Marks. On losing a re-deal, young Snipe goes berserk with fear and has to be physically restrained. Armstrong asks Marks to stay. Marks agrees.

Then Snipe hangs back, falsely claiming he has hurt his arm in the scuffle. He insists that Marks go. Marks and the other three exit through the conning tower and are picked up by the salvage vessels. Below, Manson has a fainting fit, which he says is a result of having previously suffered from malaria, but Snipe catches him using both arms without difficulty. Cheerfully at first, the four wait for the salvage operation.

Above, all goes well to begin with, in fine weather. Divers manage to secure cables under the submarine, which is slowly winched up fifteen feet per day. However, as the days go by, the weather turns, and soon there is a full storm at sea. As a result, the submarine shifts on the cables, and sinks again to the sea floor. Manson has remained in ill-health below, nursed by Snipe. However, chlorine begins to leak from a site next to his bunk; Manson is overcome by the gas and dies.

The storm is so bad that the captain of the salvage ship decides his own men are at risk and abandons the salvage operation altogether. The three left in the submarine sense that there is no hope for them. The film ends with Armstrong reading from a naval prayer book.

From early scenes in the film, and from dialogue throughout, the viewer is given insights into the personal lives of the crew, their hopes and ambitions. For example, Snipe is married to a wayward wife, whom he idolises, whilst Armstrong has been offered a lucrative shore job by his wealthy father-in-law and had been planning to leave the Navy to take it up as soon as this patrol was over.

== Cast ==
- John Mills as the captain, Lieutenant Commander Peter Armstrong
- Nigel Patrick as the first lieutenant, Lieutenant Manson
- Peter Hammond as Sub-Lieutenant Oakley
- Andrew Crawford as Sub-Lieutenant J. McFee
- Michael Brennan as Chief Petty Officer Barlow
- George Cole as Engine Room Artificer Marks
- Victor Maddern as Leading Telegraphist Hillbrook
- Roddy McMillan as Leading Seaman Andrews
- Frank Coburn as Leading Seaman Brough
- Jack Stewart as Leading Seaman Kelly
- James Hayter as Able Seaman Higgins
- Wylie Watson as Able Seaman Nobby Clark
- Richard Attenborough as Stoker Snipe
- George Thorpe as Captain Fenton
- Bernard Lee as Commander Gates
- Kenneth More as Lieutenant Commander James
- Alastair Hunter as Captain Jenner
- Helen Cherry as Helen Armstrong
- Lana Morris as Rose Snipe
- Zena Marshall as Wren

== Original play ==
The film is based on the 1940 stage play by Kenneth Wollard based on the loss of HMS Thetis. The play was very popular at the time the film was made.

== TV adaptations ==
The play had already been made as a live TV play by the BBC, first on 1 December 1946, with an afternoon rerun two days later, and was shown twice again by the BBC in February 1948 with a different cast. Nigel Patrick, who plays 1st Officer Manson in the film, played the captain in the first TV version.

In 1959 Dutch broadcaster NCRV also made a TV play from the stage play, titled S.14 vermist ("S.14 missing").

== Production ==
In the play, the captain's name is Stanford, but for the film it was changed to Armstrong. Most other characters retained their names in the film version, although the film also has additional characters, due to the insertion of flashback scenes and scenes from the rescue operation on the surface. The stage play has an all-male fourteen-character cast, while the film has a credited cast of 20 (plus a few uncredited minor roles), which also includes three women.

Almost the entire budget was provided by the National Film Finance Corporation. It was shot at Denham Studios with sets designed by the art director Alex Vetchinsky.

HMS Tiptoe was used for the external submarine shots. The Maidstone was also used.

The role played by Nigel Patrick was originally offered to Peter Finch and James Donald but neither was available. Kenneth More has one of his first film roles.

Roy Ward Baker said "I was very proud of that film and still am. It was an immense success in its day and that's how I came to go to Hollywood in 1952, because the Americans had seen that film."

== Truculent incident ==
The opening titles feature a statement about the decision to release the film in the light of the loss of HMS Truculent. HMS Truculent sank in 1950, after an accidental collision with a freighter which resulted in the loss of 64 lives. The Truculent incident took place after filming of Morning Departure had been completed, but before it went on general release to the public. The producers decided to go ahead with the film release, as a tribute to the bravery of Royal Naval personnel.

== Reception ==
=== Box office ===
According to Kinematograph Weekly it was ranked amongst the 'biggest winners' at the box office in 1950 Britain

=== Critical ===
Trade papers called the film a "notable box office attraction" in British cinemas in 1950.

The Monthly Film Bulletin wrote: "Most of the characters are competently portrayed, John Mills giving his accustomed charm and efficiency to a sympathetic part. Naval types of varying denominations are played by several Rank starlets, whilst a very brief appearance of Helen Cherry gives a little freshness before we are plunged into the impure atmosphere of the submarine. Richard Attenborough, as the claustrophobic stoker who makes good, is the least satisfying character. He has to register a coward's stupidity and a hero's bravery over a period of two hours, and since he is confined to a couple of sets in a studio submarine one tends to become rather weary of him. James Hayter supplies a modicum of comic relief in a typically English manner, and wisely does not attempt to try more serious emotions."

Kine Weekly wrote: "John Mills contributes a stupendous portrayal as the strong, silent Armstrong, Nigel Patrick is a revelation as Manson, Richard Attenborough impresses as Snipe, and James Hayter furnishes perfectly timed comedy relief as Higgins. The minor roles are filled with like care and distinction. The picture, a Journey's End of the Navy, has the authentic touch, and by its skilful interplay of character it not only reminds the audience of the debt they owe to the Submarine Service, but makes superb drama, No praise can be too high for the acting, direction and presentation. That its premiére should follow so closely on the Truculent tragedy is, possibly, the saddest coincidence of all time, but at least it is an appropriate requiem."

Variety wrote: "Morning Departure is a fine film in the best tradition of the British studios and packs a hard dramatic punch throughout its 102 minutes. ... The simple story of hope and courage can be regarded as a permanent testimonial to those who lost their lives when the Truculent went down. The hazards of rescue work and the dangers inherent in lifting a sunken sub from the sea-bed provide not only tense drama, but illustrate that mere skill alone isn't sufficient to achieve success. ... John Mills sets the standard by a smooth, dignified performance, which is matched by Richard Attenborough, who displays quiet courage and devotion after first breaking down. Nigel Patrick as the first lieutenant, and James Hayter as the irrepressible cockney cook, complete the doomed quartet who were left to die by the turn of a card. ... Roy Baker's direction merits high praise, and Desmond Dickinson's camera and lighting work are topgrade."

Bosley Crowther wrote in the New York Times: "That good old English tradition of the stiff upper-lip comes through with dignity and conviction in a taut British submarine film, Operation Disaster ... . And with John Mills heading the muster of men of the Royal Navy who face death at a depth of fifteen fathoms in a sunken undersea boat, you may be sure that a model of courage is heroically set in this film and that man in his helplessness and pathos is effectingly demonstrated here. ... A tense and tingling drama has been draped, thanks to a trimly written screen play, good direction and good performances all around. ... Except for some minor suspicions that some technical wool is pulled over our eyes, we would say that this has the appearance and the ring of a documentary film. And so are the human emotions inspired by such crisis revealed in a sure and authoritative fashion by members of the cast. Mr. Mills is quiet and resolute as the commander ...; Richard Attenborough is tense as a young sailor who goes mad with claustrophobia and then quiets down. Nigel Patrick makes a fine subordinate officer with a cynical attitude toward life and James Hayter, Andrew Crawford and Michael Brennan are superior in other roles."
