= The Safecracker =

1958 British film by Ray Milland

- Directed by: Ray Milland
- Written by: Lt Col. Reginald Danbury 'Rhys' Davies; Bruce Thomas; Paul Monash
- Produced by: David Rose; John R. Sloan
- Starring: Ray Milland; Barry Jones; Jeanette Sterke; Victor Maddern
- Cinematography: Gerald Gibbs
- Edited by: Ernest Walter
- Music by: Richard Rodney Bennett
- Production company: Coronado Productions
- Distributed by: Metro-Goldwyn-Mayer
- Release dates: 5 March 1958 (London); 5 March 1958 (NYC)
- Running time: 96 minutes
- Country: United Kingdom
- Language: English
- Budget: $471,000
- Box office: $855,000

The Safecracker is a 1958 British crime film noir directed by Ray Milland and starring Milland, Barry Jones and Victor Maddern.

== Plot ==
Colley Dawson lives a quiet life at home with his mother, but he is an expert safecracker at weekends, breaking into wealthy homes and stealing valuable art. When he is eventually arrested and convicted, Colley is approached in prison by Major Adbury, who offers him a deal in exchange for helping with the war effort. Colley will be given his freedom if he uses his safecracking expertise to perform a mission behind enemy lines. The dangerous mission is to breach a difficult safe in a Nazi chateau and steal a list of German spies operating in England. Colley agrees and is trained as a commando and parachuted into Belgium for the mission.

== Cast ==
- Ray Milland as Colley Dawson
- Barry Jones as Bennett Carfield
- Jeanette Sterke as Irene
- Victor Maddern as Morris
- Ernest Clark as Major Adbury
- Cyril Raymond as Inspector Frankham
- Melissa Stribling as Angela
- Percy Herbert as Sergeant Harper
- Barbara Everest as Mrs. Dawson
- Anthony Nicholls as General Prior
- David Horne as Herbert Fenwright
- Colin Gordon as Dakers
- Clive Morton as Sir George Turvey
- John Welsh as Inspector Owing
- Colin Tapley as Colonel Charles Mercer
- Ian MacNaughton as Thomson
- Charles Lloyd-Pack as Lambert
- Ferdy Mayne as Greek Ship Owner
- Arnold Bell as Detective
- Bernard Fox as Shafter
- Jackie Collins as Fenwright's Secretary
- Basil Dignam as Air Vice Marshal
- Sam Kydd as McCullers
- Hilda Fenemore as Mrs. McCullers
- David Lodge as Parachute Instructor
- Richard Marner as German N.C.O

== Production ==
The film was originally known as The Tale of Willie Gordon. Ray Milland left for England in June 1957.

In December 1957, producer David E. Rose announced that he and Milland would produce a second film together, but the project did not materialise.

As a curiosity: German soldiers wear helmets with Afrikakorps insignia, probably remnants from a film about Rommel.

== Reception ==
=== Critical ===
In The New York Times, Bosley Crowther called the film "a good, not great, suspense thriller," adding, "The film is full of those tense situations in which the hero slips into a room and opens a safe in terrifying silence. Mr. Milland is good in it. So is Barry Jones."

=== Box office ===
According to MGM records, the film earned $280,000 in the U.S. and Canada and $675,000 elsewhere, resulting in a profit of $59,000.
