= Who Goes There! =

- Directed by: Anthony Kimmins
- Written by: John Dighton
- Based on: Who Goes There! by John Dighton
- Produced by: Anthony Kimmins
- Starring: Nigel Patrick; Valerie Hobson; George Cole; Peggy Cummins; A. E. Matthews
- Cinematography: Edward Scaife; John Wilcox
- Edited by: Gerald Turney-Smith
- Music by: Muir Mathieson
- Production company: London Film Productions
- Distributed by: British Lion Film Corporation
- Release date: 10 June 1952
- Running time: 85 minutes
- Country: United Kingdom
- Language: English
- Box office: £123,542 (UK)

Who Goes There! I (U.S. title: The Passionate Sentry) is a 1952 British comedy film directed by Anthony Kimmins and starring Nigel Patrick, Valerie Hobson and George Cole. It was written by John Dighton based on his 1950 play Who Goes There!. The film depicts the farcical activities of the various inhabitants of a grace and favour house near St James's Palace in Central London.

== Plot ==
Sir Hubert Cornwall is a member of the royal household and lives with his adult children Miles and Alex in a grace and favour house. One weekend, noticing the house is empty, Queen's Guard sentry Arthur Crisp installs his ex-girfriend there while she recovers from an accident. Miles returns unexpectedly and assumes Christina is a burglar, and soon falls in love with her. Alex appears and tries to reunite Christina with Arthur, who has been caught leaving his post and faces a court martial. When Sir Hubert returns he frees Arthur by telephoning Buckingham Palace, and Arthur and Christina are reunited.

== Cast ==
- Nigel Patrick as Miles Cornwall
- Valerie Hobson as Alex Cornwall
- George Cole as Guardsman Arthur Crisp
- Peggy Cummins as Christina Deed
- Anthony Bushell as Major Guy Ashley
- A. E. Matthews as Sir Hubert Cornwall
- Joss Ambler as tour guide

== Production ==
The film was shot at Shepperton Studios with some location filming around the Palace in London. The film's sets were designed by the art director Wilfred Shingleton.

Sidney Gilliat claims that Alexander Korda directed the film but gave credit to someone else.

== Release ==
For the United States release the American censors removed two uses of the word "Cripes!".

== Reception ==
The Monthly Film Bulletin wrote: "Made in the canned style of Home at Seven, this traditional British farce is a rather more competent exampie of much staple fare in the '30s, It s all very larkish and class-conscious, charaded to the manner born by Nigel Patrick, Valerie Hobson, and A. E. Matthews, and with distinct unease by Anthony Bushell, Peggy Cummins and George Cole."

Kine Weekly wrote: "Streamlined farcical comedy. ... Clean, brightly burnished fun smoothly put over by an attractive cast and a resourceful director. It's admirably equipped to amuse all types of audiences."

Variety wrote: "First-class escapist fare. Dialog is crisply written. Picture is smoothly directed and a good compact all-round cast extract every ounce of fun. ... Good camera work and smart editing round out the technical qualities."

Leslie Halliwell said: "Very British romantic farce, dully and quickly filmed from a West End success."

In British Sound Films: The Studio Years 1928–1959 David Quinlan rated the film as "good", writing: "Well-oiled class-distinctions farce; a popular success."

== Radio version ==
A version of Who Goes There! was broadcast on BBC Radio Saturday Night Theatre on 25 March 1954.
