= And God Created Woman (1956 film) =

1956 French romantic film by Roger Vadim

- Theatrical release poster
- French: Et Dieu... créa la femme
- Directed by: Roger Vadim
- Written by: Roger Vadim; Raoul Lévy
- Produced by: Raoul Lévy
- Starring: Brigitte Bardot; Curd Jürgens; Jean-Louis Trintignant
- Cinematography: Armand Thirard
- Edited by: Victoria Mercanton
- Music by: Paul Misraki
- Production companies: Iéna Productions; Union Cinématographique Lyonnaise
- Distributed by: Cocinor
- Release date: 28 November 1956 (France)
- Running time: 91 minutes
- Country: France
- Language: French
- Budget: $300,000 (est.)
- Box office: $12 million (U.S.); $21 million (Foreign); $33 million (Worldwide); 3,919,059 admissions (France)

And God Created Woman (French: Et Dieu... créa la femme) is a 1956 French romantic drama film directed by Roger Vadim and starring Brigitte Bardot, his then wife. Though not her first film, it is widely recognized as the vehicle that launched Bardot into the public spotlight and immediately created her "sex kitten" persona, making her an overnight sensation. It was Vadim's directorial debut.

When the film was released in the United States by Kingsley-International Pictures in 1957, it pushed the boundaries of the representation of sexuality in American cinema, and most available prints of the film were heavily edited to conform with the Hays Code censorial standards. In 1999 filmmaker Peter Bogdanovich credited it for "breaking French cinema out of U.S. art houses and into the mainstream and thereby inadvertently also paving the way for the takeover in France of the New Wave filmmakers."

A poorly-received, unrelated, English-language film, also titled And God Created Woman, was directed by Vadim and released in 1988.

== Plot ==
Juliette is a voluptuous 18-year-old orphan in 1956 Saint-Tropez, France. A hedonist, she makes no effort to restrain her natural sensuality – lying nude sunning in her yard, habitually kicking her shoes off and stalking about barefoot, and disregarding both societal conventions and the opinions of others. This causes a stir, attracting the attention of most of the men around her and infuriating the women.

Sexually charged, she has been intimate with the much older, extremely wealthy Eric Carradine, who promises the bicycle-riding teen-ager a new car for her favors. He wants to build a casino in Saint-Tropez, but his plans are blocked by a small family-owned shipyard on the stretch of land he needs for the development.

Antoine, the eldest of the three Tardieu brothers whose father had established the yard, returns from Toulon for the weekend to hear Carradine's proposal; Juliette is waiting for the tall, handsome catch to take her back to Toulon with him. His intentions towards her are purely physical, which get temporarily short-circuited when she overhears them, but he assuages her, promises he will meet her on the morning bus, has his way with her, then lets the bus drive right on past her anxious flagging.

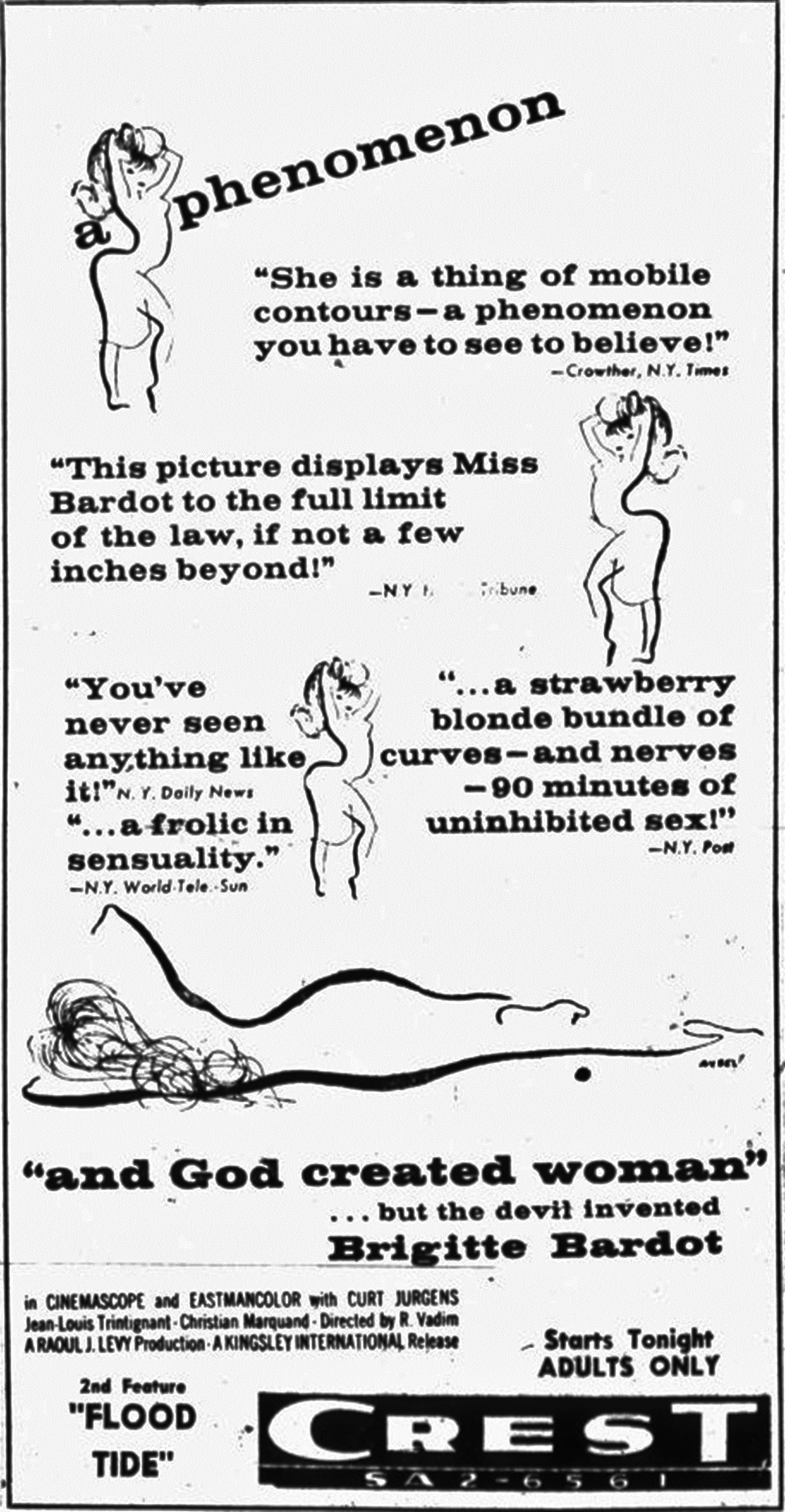
U.S theatrical advertisement, 9 April 1958

Exasperated with Juliette's outrageous behavior, her elderly guardians threaten to send her back to the orphanage, which will confine her until she is 21. To keep her in town, Carradine pleads unsuccessfully with Antoine to marry her. He will have nothing to do with it. Recognizing what a three-year sentence back in an orphanage will do to Juliette, his infatuated and naive middle brother, the plain Michel, proposes marriage. Despite her love for Antoine, she accepts.

They are wed in a scantly attended church service - Antoine never shows. In a public square afterwards a local tough insults both Michel and Juliette. Offended, Michel slugs him, only to take a very severe beating. The couple slips by the reception dinner back at the family home, makes passionate love, and Juliette rudely ducks downstairs to load dinner plates and grab a bottle of wine, leaving those in attendance slack-jawed.

Carradine buys the large harbor marina and offers the Tardieus a 30% stake in it to sway the deal with them; Antoine negotiates to run it. With him back in Saint-Tropez Juliette's behavior becomes increasingly disrespectful toward Michel. When he is gone for the day on business she takes off in one of the marina's boats. It catches fire from engine trouble and Antoine swims out to save her. While they are washed up together on a wild beach she seduces him.

Afterwards, Juliette takes to her bed, feverish. She confesses her tryst with Antoine to Christian, the youngest Tardieu brother. When Madame Tardieu, who has always hated Juliette, hears about it she tells Michel that he has to dump Juliette promptly. Michel goes to their room to talk with her, but she has disappeared.

Michel scours the town for her. In a confrontation with Antoine at the yard he pulls a gun, then fistfights him until Antoine is dazed by an accidental blow to the head.

Juliette drifts to a bar and starts drinking double-brandies. Her friend Lucienne appears, then alerts Carradine that Juliette is making a spectacle of herself. He comes to collect her, offering to whisk her halfway round the globe to laughter and happiness, but she refuses. Michel arrives, gun drawn, but Juliette ignores him and continues her improvised and sexually suggestive dancing with a band of Caribbean musicians.

Carradine is wounded trying to take the gun from Michel. He has Antoine drive him to a surgeon friend in Nice, to keep the local police out of it. En route Carradine reveals his deep feelings for Juliette, but confides to Antoine "That girl was made to destroy men". He reminds Antoine to never forget who is boss, and tells him he is being reassigned elsewhere.

Back at the bar Michel angrily slaps Juliette hard, four times. She wrestles a smile that she has provoked him enough to act so strongly. They walk home together hand in hand.

== Cast ==
- Brigitte Bardot as Juliette Hardy
- Curd Jürgens as Éric Carradine
- Jean-Louis Trintignant as Michel Tardieu
- Marie Glory as Mme. Tardieu
- Georges Poujouly as Christian Tardieu
- Christian Marquand as Antoine Tardieu
- Jane Marken as Madame Morin
- Jean Tissier as M. Vigier-Lefranc
- Isabelle Corey as Lucienne
- Jacqueline Ventura as Mme Vigier-Lefranc
- Jacques Ciron as The Secretary of Éric
- Paul Faivre as M. Morin
- Jany Mourey as The Orphanage Representative
- Philippe Grenier as Perri
- Jean Lefebvre as The Man who wanted to dance
- Leopoldo Francés as The Dancer
- Jean Toscano as René

== Production ==
By the mid-1950s Roger Vadim was an established screenwriter and had written several movies starring his then wife Brigitte Bardot. Producer Raoul Levy wanted Vadim to write and direct a film starring Bardot, and suggested he adapt the book The Little Genius by Maurice Garçon. Vadim disliked the book and came up with a new story, one based on a trial of a woman who had been the mistress of three different brothers, and who killed one of them. Vadim was particularly taken with the attitude of the woman towards her lovers, the jury and the police. Levy liked Vadim's idea and obtained finance.

Levy sought finance from Columbia Pictures, which was interested in the film even if it could not produce or distribute it itself. Money would be forthcoming, as well as color and CinemaScope, provided Curd Jurgens was given a role. The parts of the brothers had already been cast so Vadim rewrote the script in two days to expand the part of an arms dealer so it could be offered to Jurgens. Meanwhile, Columbia acquired small-scale independent Kingsley-International Pictures to finesse its way around being associated with a Hays Code-violating film with nudity and adult themes.

== Reception ==
=== Box office ===
The film was a big hit in France, one of the ten most popular films at the British box-office in its year of release, and the biggest foreign-language film ever in the United States at the time. It earned over $8 million for France, more than the country's biggest export (the Renault Dauphine), grossed $12 million in the U.S. (good for $4 million in earnings), and a further $21 million around the globe.

In the United States the film was released by Kingsley-International Pictures, operating as a subsidiary of Columbia Pictures to spare the studio (and financial backer) a scourging for undermining the Hays Code. The Catholic National Legion of Decency gave it a "C" for "Condemned" rating. A Columbia spokesman stated that the film would have received twice as many bookings with a less restrictive "B" rating, but would only have done half the business. Variety reported that in spite of the rating, the film broke "local records at the Paris Theatre, N.Y., and at other houses where it has played", and noted that "In Fitchburg, Mass., it actually outgrossed Ten Commandments." Legal efforts to block or seize the film only fanned its notoriety.

The film was extremely popular in Kansas City, where it played for a year at the Kimo Theatre, grossing over $100,000, a record for Kansas City at the time. In Europe, this movie smashed attendance records from Norway to the Middle East.

In 1993, author Peter Lev described the film's impact in America:

And God Created Woman's impact on the film industry was significant. New Bardot films were eagerly snapped up by distributors, and old Bardot films were released or re-released. Prices for distribution rights to foreign films escalated overall.

=== Critical response ===
Variety predicted the film was "just average for any US possibilities... film unfolds slowly."

The film received mixed reviews in the United States. Bosley Crowther, the film critic for The New York Times, found Brigitte Bardot attractive but the film lacking and was not able to recommend it. He wrote: "Bardot moves herself in a fashion that fully accentuates her charms. She is undeniably a creation of superlative craftsmanship. But that's the extent of the transcendence, for there is nothing sublime about the script of this completely single-minded little picture. ...We can't recommend this little item as a sample of the best in Gallic films. It is clumsily put together and rather bizarrely played. There is nothing more than sultry fervor in the performance of Mlle. Bardot, and Christian Marquand and Jean-Louis Trintignant are mainly heavy-breathers as her men".

Film critic Dennis Schwartz wrote in 2004: "The breezy erotic drama was laced with some thinly textured sad moments that hardly resonated as serious drama. But as slight as the story was it was always lively and easy to take on the eyes, adding up to hardly anything more than a bunch of snapshots of Bardot posturing as a sex kitten in various stages of undress. The public loved it and it became a big box-office smash, and paved the way for a spate of sexy films to follow. What was more disturbing than its dullish dialogue and flaunting of Bardot as a sex object, was that underneath its call for liberation was a reactionary and sexist view of sex."

Filmink declared "There are few better star entrances in cinematic history than Brigitte Bardot’s in this movie – sunbaking naked next to a sheet as she chats to Curt Jurgens. This is a brilliantly constructed star vehicle, with Roger Vadim... beautifully exploiting Bardot’s persona. She pouts, wiggles, lolls about topless on a yacht, sunbakes, listens to romantic songs, dances evocatively to jazz, and generally runs riot."

Rotten Tomatoes reports a 69% approval rating based on 13 reviews, with an average rating of 6.4/10.

== See also ==
- And God Created Woman (soundtrack), an album based on the soundtrack of the film
