= Clive Morton =

English actor (1904–1975)

- Gordon Jackson (as Butler Hudson, left) and Clive Morton (as Butler Makepiece) in A Change of Scene (1973)
- Born: 16 March 1904; London, England
- Died: 24 September 1975 (aged 71); London, England
- Occupation: Actor
- Years active: 1932–1975
- Spouse(s): Fanny Rowe Joan Harben (div. 1953)

Clive Morton (16 March 1904 – 24 September 1975) was an English actor. Best known for playing upper class Englishmen, he made many screen appearances, especially on television.

== Career ==
In 1955, Morton appeared in Laurence Olivier's film version of Richard III. On television, he appeared in Doctor Who as prison governor George Trenchard in The Sea Devils in 1972, played a butler in an episode of Upstairs Downstairs in 1973, and was cast as Commander Julius Rogue in the first series of the children's television series Rogue's Rock in 1974.

Morton was also a Shakespearean actor and an Associate Artiste of the Royal Shakespeare Company. In the 1964 'Histories' Repertoire he played the Bishop of Carlisle in Richard II, the Earl of Worcester in Henry IV and the Earl of Talbot in Henry VI.

== Personal life ==
Morton was married to Joan Harben and divorced in 1953. He then married Fresh Fields actress Fanny Rowe. They acted together on stage in the 1955 J.B. Priestley play Mr. Kettle and Mrs. Moon.

== Selected filmography ==
- The Last Coupon (1932) – (uncredited)
- The Secret of the Loch (1934) – Reporter / Photographer in Pub (uncredited)
- The Man Who Changed His Mind (1936) – Journalist (uncredited)
- Dead Men Tell No Tales (1939) – Frank Fielding
- While the Sun Shines (1947) – Guide
- Jassy (1947) – Sir William Fennell
- Mine Own Executioner (1947) – Robert Paston
- This Was a Woman (1948) – Company Director
- Bond Street (1948) – Bank Manager (uncredited)
- The Blind Goddess (1948) – Mersel
- Quartet (1948) – Henry Blane (segment "The Colonel's Lady")
- Here Come the Huggetts (1948) – Mr. Campbell
- Scott of the Antarctic (1948) – Herbert Ponting F.R.P.S.
- Vote for Huggett (1949) – Mr. Campbell
- The Huggetts Abroad (1949) – Campbell (uncredited)
- Kind Hearts and Coronets (1949) – The Prison Governor
- A Run for Your Money (1949) – Editor
- The Blue Lamp (1950) – Police Sgt. Brooks
- Trio (1950) – Ship's Captain (in segment Mr. Know-All)
- Traveller's Joy (1950) – Svensen
- Night Without Stars (1951) – Dr. Coulson
- The Lavender Hill Mob (1951) – Station Sergeant
- His Excellency (1952) – The G.O.C.
- Castle in the Air (1952) – MacFee
- Turn the Key Softly (1953) – Walters
- Carrington V.C. (1954) – Lt. Col. Huxford
- The Harassed Hero (1954) – Archer
- Orders Are Orders (1955) – Lt. Gen. Sir Cuthbert Grahame Foxe
- Richard III (1955) – The Lord Rivers
- Beyond Mombasa (1956) – Irate Man
- Seven Waves Away (1957) – Maj. Gen. Barrington
- After the Ball (1957) – Henry de Frece
- Lucky Jim (1957) – Sir Hector Gore-Urquhart
- The Safecracker (1958) – Sir George Turvey
- The Duke Wore Jeans (1958) – Lord Edward Whitecliffe
- The Moonraker (1958) – Lord Harcourt
- Next to No Time (1958) – Wallis
- The Navy Lark (1959) – Rear Admiral
- Make Mine a Million (1959) – National TV director general
- Shake Hands with the Devil (1959) – Sir Arnold Fielding
- The Pure Hell of St Trinian's (1960) – V.I.P.
- The Clue of the New Pin (1961) – Ramsey Brown
- A Matter of WHO (1961) – Hatfield
- I Thank a Fool (1962) – Judge
- Lawrence of Arabia (1962) – Artillery General at Field Briefing (uncredited)
- The Alphabet Murders (1965) – 'X'
- Stranger in the House (1967) – Col. Flower
- Star! (1968) – Army Officer Outside Window (uncredited)
- Lock Up Your Daughters (1969) – Bowsell
- Goodbye, Mr. Chips (1969) – General Paunceforth
- Jane Eyre (1970) – Mr. Eshton
- Zeppelin (1971) – Lord Delford
- Young Winston (1972) – Dr. Roose
- 11 Harrowhouse (1974) – Sir Harold the Chairman
