= Kingsley-International Pictures =

Kingsley-International Pictures was an American film importing and releasing agency, located in New York, active between 1952 and 1962 with its product distributed by Union Motion Picture Distributors. The company specialized in importing foreign art house films, mainly French but also some independent British titles, such as Carrington V.C. (1955), Lucky Jim (1957), The League of Gentlemen (1960), and Only Two Can Play (1962).

== History ==
The company was started and run by Edward Kingsley (1914-1962), a pioneer in "art house" film distribution in the US. Kingsley began as a publicist for Paramount Pictures in 1933. In 1949, he began distributing French films in partnership with Arthur Mayer, another art house distribution pioneer, but after a few years he branched out on his own by starting Kingsley-International Pictures.

The company is mainly famous for two things: in 1957 it introduced Brigitte Bardot to the American audience via And God Created Woman, which created a Bardot fever in the USA, and it released the first film version of Lady Chatterley's Lover, the 1955 French film L'Amant de lady Chatterley, which in 1955 was banned by New York State Board of Regents, not because of any sex scenes, but because it "promoted adultery". The film was eventually released in 1959 after the US Supreme Court ruled the banning unconstitutional. That court ruling is seen as a landmark decision forming modern US views on censorship.

In 1956, the company became the art house subsidiary of Columbia Pictures, not because of a sudden interest from Columbia for foreign films in general, but as a way for the Hollywood major to distribute and make money from And God Created Woman without having to submit the film to the PCA for approval, which the company as member of the MPAA was obliged to do.

When Kingsley died in 1962, at the age of 47, the company was transferred to Kingsley Global. A company owned by the Kingsley Family.
