= Victor Maddern =

English actor (1928–1993)

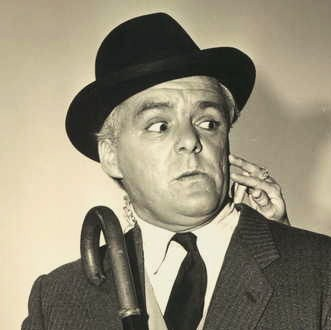
- Maddern in Perry Mason (1963)
- Born: Victor Jack Maddern; 16 March 1928; Seven Kings, Ilford, Essex, England
- Died: 22 June 1993 (aged 65); Hackney, London, England
- Education: Royal Academy of Dramatic Art
- Occupations: Actor, businessman
- Years active: 1950–1992
- Spouse: Joan Neuville (m. 1949)
- Children: 4

Victor Jack Maddern (16 March 1928 – 22 June 1993) was an English actor. He was described by The Telegraph as having "one of the most distinctive and eloquent faces in post-war British cinema".

== Life and career ==
Born in Seven Kings, Ilford, Essex, Maddern attended Beal Grammar Boys school and afterwards joined the Merchant Navy at the age of 15 and served in the Second World War from 1943 until its end and was medically discharged in 1946.

He subsequently trained at the Royal Academy of Dramatic Art (RADA). He made his first screen appearance in Seven Days to Noon in 1950, playing a reluctant soldier obliged to shoot a psychotic scientist. One of his earliest stage roles was as Sam Weller in The Trial of Mr Pickwick (1952). Appearing as Helicon in a production of Albert Camus' play Caligula (1964), Maddern was singled out for critical praise, and in My Darling Daisy (1970) portrayed the notorious Frank Harris. He also did two stints in the highly successful Agatha Christie play The Mousetrap, the longest-running production in London's West End.

From 1950 to the early 1990s, Maddern appeared in films and TV series, often portraying military types, usually cast as sergeants or corporals, as well as privates, seaman or airmen, played either straight or comically; one exception to this was when he portrayed a deformed hunchback, named Carl, in the horror film Blood of the Vampire (1958), and another was when he played the lead role of a crippled-bartender-turned-murderer in Street of Shadows in 1953. He played minor roles in five Carry On films. Among his many TV roles were Private Gross in Denis Cannan's Captain Carvallo, old Lampwick's son-in-law in The Dick Emery Show, and Tommy Finch, the British dad in Fair Exchange in 1962–63 on the CBS network, one of the first hour-long situation comedies. In 1963, he had a guest role in Perry Mason as jewel smuggler Gilbert Tyrell, in the episode "The Case of the Floating Stones". Maddern also appeared in an episode of Dixon of Dock Green which has since been lost, save for an outtake reel in which he repeatedly failed to pronounce "Dock Green Nick".

Besides acting, Maddern ran a script-printing business, and in 1991 opened a public speaking school. A lifelong Conservative Party voter, he offered special rates to Conservative MPs and constituency workers.

In his later years, Maddern devoted much of his time to charitable work. He was married with four daughters. He died from a brain tumour in Hackney, London, in 1993, aged 65.

== Partial filmography ==
- Morning Departure (1950) – Leading Telegraphist Hillbrook
- Seven Days to Noon (1950) – Private Jackson
- The Franchise Affair (1951) – Mechanic
- Pool of London (1951) – First Tram Conductor (uncredited)
- I’ll Never Forget You (1951) – Geiger Man (uncredited)
- High Treason (1951) – Anarchist (uncredited)
- His Excellency (1952) – Soldier
- Angels One Five (1952) – Airman
- The Planter's Wife (1952) – Radio operator (uncredited)
- Top Secret (1952) – British N.C.O.
- Time Bomb (1953) – Saboteur
- Street of Shadows (1953) – Danny Thomas
- Sailor of the King (1953) – Signalman Willy 'Misery' Earnshaw
- Malta Story (1953) – Grouchy Soldier Clearing Rocks (uncredited)
- The Good Beginning (1953) – Bookie's Runner (uncredited)
- The Young Lovers (1954) – Sailor (uncredited)
- The Sea Shall Not Have Them (1954) – Gus Westover
- Carrington V.C. (1954) – Sergeant Owen
- Fabian of the Yard (1954)
- Raising a Riot (1955) – Guardsman (uncredited)
- The End of the Affair (1955) – 1st Orator
- The Night My Number Came Up (1955) – Engineer
- Footsteps in the Fog (1955) – Jones
- Josephine and Men (1955) – Henry
- The Cockleshell Heroes (1955) – Sergeant Craig
- It's a Great Day (1955) – Charlie Mead
- Private's Progress (1956) – Pvt. George Blake
- The Last Man to Hang (1956) – Bonaker
- Child in the House (1956) – Bert
- A Hill in Korea (1956) – Pvt. Lindop
- The Man in the Sky, aka Decision Against Time (1957) – Joe Biggs
- Seven Waves Away (1957) – Willy Hawkins
- Saint Joan (1957) – English Soldier
- Face in the Night (1957) – Ted
- Strangers' Meeting (1957) – Willie Fisher
- Barnacle Bill (1957) – Figg
- Son of a Stranger (1957) – Lenny
- Carve Her Name with Pride (1958) – Sergeant, Parachute Training Instructor (uncredited)
- Happy Is the Bride (1958) – Shop Steward
- The Safecracker (1958) – Morris
- Dunkirk (1958) – Merchant Seaman in Pub
- Cat & Mouse (1958) – Superintendent Harding
- Blood of the Vampire (1958) – Carl
- I Was Monty's Double (1958) – Orderly Sergeant
- The Square Peg (1958) – Cpl Motor Pool. (uncredited)
- The Siege of Pinchgut (1959) – Bert
- I'm All Right Jack (1959) – Knowles
- Please Turn Over (1959) – Works Manager
- Sink the Bismarck! (1960) – Able Seaman (uncredited)
- Carry On Constable (1960) – Detective Sergeant Liddell
- Let's Get Married (1960) – Works Manager
- Light Up the Sky! (1960) – Lance Corporal Tomlinson
- Watch Your Stern (1960) – Sailor fishing for bike
- Crossroads to Crime (1960) – Len
- Exodus (1960) – Sergeant
- Carry On Regardless (1961) – First Sinister Passenger
- Raising the Wind (1961) – Removal Man
- On the Fiddle (1961) – First Airman
- Petticoat Pirates (1961) – CPO Nixon
- H.M.S. Defiant (1962) – Bosun Dawlish
- The Longest Day (1962) – Camp Cook (uncredited)
- Carry On Spying (1964) – Milchmann
- Carry On Cleo (1964) – Sergeant-Major
- Rotten to the Core (1965) – Anxious O'Toole
- Bunny Lake Is Missing (1965) – Taxi Driver
- Circus of Fear (1966) – Mason
- The Magnificent Two (1967) – Drunken Soldier
- Run Like a Thief (1967) – Abel Baker
- Cuckoo Patrol (1967) – Dicko
- The Lost Continent (1968) – The Mate
- Decline and Fall... of a Birdwatcher (1968) – First Warder
- Chitty Chitty Bang Bang (1968) – Junkman
- The Bushbaby (1969) – Barman
- The Magic Christian (1969) – Hot Dog Vendor
- Cromwell (1970) – Executioner (uncredited)
- The Magnificent Six and 1/2 (1971)
- Steptoe and Son (1972) – Chauffeur
- Digby, the Biggest Dog in the World (1973) – Dog Home Manager
- Carry On Emmannuelle (1978) – Man in Launderette
- Around the World in 80 Days (1989) – Liverpool Ticket Agent
- Freddie as F.R.O.7 (1992) – Old Gentleman Raven (voice) (final film role)

== Selected television credits ==
- The Vise (aka Saber of London) (1957) – Miller in Episode "Bishops Sometimes Bite"
- The Adventures of Robin Hood (1958) – Hugo
- Sir Francis Drake (1961–1962) – Brewer / Ship's Cook
- Fair Exchange (1962–1963) – Tommy Finch
- Perry Mason (1963) – Gilbert Tyrell
- Mess Mates (1960) – 'Tug' Nelson
- Bonanza (1963) – Dave
- Crossroads (1964) – Bert Henderson
- The Troubleshooters (1965) – Rogers
- Gideon's Way (1965) – Charles Randle
- Take a Pair of Private Eyes (1966) – Cokey Brock
- The Avengers (1966) – Jackson in Episode "The Thirteenth Hole"
- The Prisoner (1967) – Bandmaster
- The Baron (1967) – Dino
- The Wednesday Play (1967) – Wagger
- The Saint (1967–1968) – Enrico Montesino
- Dixon of Dock Green (1967–1975) – Orrie Heppledene / Forbes / Jimmy Lester / Fred Hall
- The Ugliest Girl in Town (1968) – Freddie
- Doctor Who - (Fury from the Deep) (1968) – Robson
- Softly Softly (1970)
- Randall and Hopkirk (Deceased) (1970) – Detective Sergeant Watts
- The Dick Emery Show (1968–1980) – Ernie
- Paul Temple (1971) – Bill Stacey
- The Frighteners (4 August 1972, ITV (TV network)) - ep. 'The Disappearing Man' - Harry Henshaw
- Crown Court (1973) – Joe Fisk
- Men of Affairs (1974) – Removal man
- 1990 (1977) – Sammy Calhoun
- Mr. Big (1977) – Fick Mack
- You're Only Young Twice (1979) – Fingers
- Together (1980) – Harry Klein
- In Loving Memory (1982) – Comic
- That's My Boy (1983) – Bluebird Johnny
- Miss Marple: The Moving Finger (1985) – Police Constable Johnson
- The Beiderbecke Tapes (1987) – Sam Bentley
- C.A.B. (1988) – Private Tripe
- The Bill (1990) – Mr Grant
- The Darling Buds of May (1992) – Fruity Pears
