= Someone at the Door (play) =

1935 play by Campbell Christie and Dorothy Christie

Someone at the Door is a British comedy thriller play by Campbell Christie and Dorothy Christie which was first staged in 1935, and ran successfully at the Aldwych, New and Comedy theatres in London's West End.

== Cast ==
- Henry Kendall as Ronnie Martin
- Ivan Samson as Bill Reid
- George Devine as Price
- Gilbert Davis as P.C. O'Brien
- Basil Radford as Harry Kapel, J.P.
- Walter Fitzgerald as Sergeant Spedding
- Frank Chaytor as stranger
- Diana Churchill as Sally Martin

== Adaptations ==
The play has been twice adapted into a film: Someone at the Door (1936) directed by Herbert Brenon, starring Aileen Marson and Billy Milton, and Someone at the Door (1950) directed by Francis Searle, starring Michael Medwin and Garry Marsh. It was also made into a 1939 television film for the BBC.
