= Nigel Patrick =

English actor and stage director (1912–1981)

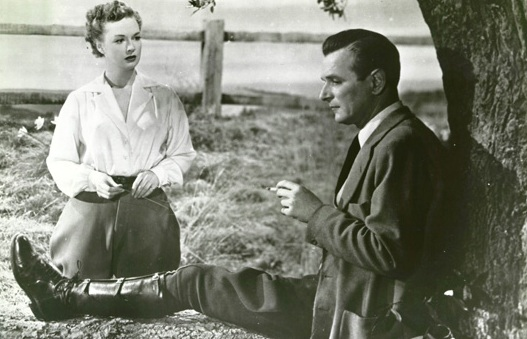
- With Beatrice Campbell in Grand National Night (1953)
- Born: Nigel Dennis Patrick Wemyss-Gorman; 2 May 1912; Clapham, London, England
- Died: 21 September 1981 (aged 69); London, England
- Occupations: Actor, director, stage manager, writer
- Years active: 1932–1981
- Spouse: Beatrice Campbell (m. 1951; died 1979)
- Children: 2
- Awards: Zulueta Award – Best Actor; 1960 The League of Gentlemen

Nigel Dennis Patrick Wemyss-Gorman (2 May 1912 – 21 September 1981) was an English actor and stage director born into a theatrical family.

During the late 1940s and 1950s, he became known as a debonair leading man in British films, though he could also portray rogues. He featured in The Sound Barrier (aka, Breaking Through the Sound Barrier, 1952), under the direction of David Lean.

== Biography ==
Patrick was born in London, England, the son of Thomas Joseph Charles Aubrey Wemyss Gorman (born 1875 – died 19??) and actress Dorothy Hilda Turner (1890–1969).

=== Stage actor ===
He made his professional stage debut in The Life Machine at the Regent Theatre, in Kings Cross, London, in 1932 following a period in repertory. Thereafter he appeared in many successful plays, including Half a Crown (1934), Ringmaster, Roulette (both 1935), The Lady of La Paz and Madmoiselle (both 1936).

He starred in the long-running George and Margaret (1937) at the Wyndham's Theatre, which ran for 799 performances.

He followed it with Tony Draws a Horse and Children to Bless You (both 1939).

=== Second World War ===
His acting career was put on hold until after service in the Second World War, during which, as a Lieutenant-Colonel in the King's Royal Rifle Corps, he fought in the Middle East, North Africa and Italy.

=== Film career ===
His debut film performance was as a reporter in a supporting romantic role in Mrs. Pym of Scotland Yard (1940). It was filmed in July 1939 and released the following year. After the war, Patrick appeared in Morning Departure (1946) on TV and Fools Rush In, Tomorrow's Child (1946) and Noose (1947) on stage.

Patrick had film roles in Spring in Park Lane (1948), Uneasy Terms (1948) and notably Noose (1948) playing a spiv. Patrick had a good part in Silent Dust (1948) and was promoted to star for The Jack of Diamonds (1949), which he also co-wrote.

He supported Patricia Roc in The Perfect Woman (1949), and had a key role in the film version of Morning Departure (1950) (a different part to the one he had played on TV).

Patrick was one of several names in Trio (1950), based on stories by W. Somerset Maugham, and appeared in the Hollywood-financed Pandora and the Flying Dutchman (1951). He was the young teacher in The Browning Version (1951) with Michael Redgrave, and appeared in a popular comedy Young Wives' Tale (1951). He returned to the world of Maugham with Encore (1951) and was in Who Goes There! (1951) on stage.

Patrick reprised his Who Goes There! (1952) performance on film then played a test pilot in the popular The Sound Barrier (1952). He was then in Meet Me Tonight (1952) and The Pickwick Papers (1952). Due mostly to The Sound Barrier, exhibitors voted Patrick the seventh most popular British film star with the public, in 1952.

Patrick was in Grand National Night (1953) and was the ninth most popular British star. On stage he was in Escapade (1953) and Birthday Honours (1953).

The following year he was in Forbidden Cargo (1954) and was one of several British stars in The Sea Shall Not Have Them (1954). He supported Richard Widmark in A Prize of Gold (1955) for Warwick Films, who announced Patrick might direct In All Dishonesty for them on stage. It did not happen. Instead Patrick starred in a comedy All for Mary (1955). On stage he was in Green Room Rags (1954) and The Remarkable Mr. Pennypacker (1955).

He had a major role in Raintree County (1957).

=== Director ===
For Warwick Films, Patrick starred in and directed How to Murder a Rich Uncle (1957).

He supported Jeffrey Hunter in Count Five and Die (1957) and appeared in The Egg (1957) on stage. Patrick made another for Warwick but as an actor only, The Man Inside (1958), with Jack Palance.

On stage Patrick directed No Way to Kill (1958) and Not in the Book (1958) and acted in and directed Pleasure of His Company (1959). He starred in Sapphire (1959), winner of Best British Film at the 1960 BAFTA Film Awards. It was directed by Basil Dearden who then used Patrick in The League of Gentlemen (1960). On stage he acted in and directed Settled Out of Court (1960).

Patrick made another for Warwick as an actor, The Trials of Oscar Wilde (1960), then made Johnny Nobody (1961) for them as director and actor.

He was in Zero One (1962–1965) on TV and starred in the tough crime thriller The Informers (1963).

=== Later career ===
Patrick appeared on stage in The Schoolmistress (1964) and Present Laughter (1965) and he directed Past Imperfect (1964) and Present Laughter (1965) and Alan Ayckbourn's Relatively Speaking (1967) at the Duke of York's Theatre. Film appearances included Battle of Britain (1969), The Virgin Soldiers (1969) and The Executioner (1970). He directed Avanti! (1968) on Broadway.

Other stage appearances included Best of Friends (1970), Reunion in Vienna (1971), Habeas Corpus (1974), The Pay Off (1974), Dear Daddy (1976) and Peter Pan (1978). He also worked steadily as a director.

== Personal life and death ==
He married the actress Beatrice Campbell at St James's, Spanish Place, Marylebone, London on 12 January 1951. She predeceased him in 1979; he died, two years later, from lung cancer, on 21 September 1981.

== Filmography ==
=== As an actor ===
- Mrs. Pym of Scotland Yard (1940) as Richard Loddon
- Spring in Park Lane (1948) as Mr. Bacon
- Uneasy Terms (1948) as Lucien Donnelly
- Noose (1948) as Bar Gorman
- Silent Dust (1949) as Simon Rawley
- The Jack of Diamonds (1949) as Alan Butler
- The Perfect Woman (1949) as Roger Cavendish
- Morning Departure (1950) as First Lieutenant Harry Manson
- Trio (1950) as Max Kealada (Segment: "Mr. Know-All")
- Pandora and the Flying Dutchman (1951) as Stephen Cameron
- The Browning Version (1951) as Frank Hunter
- Young Wives' Tale (1951) as Rodney Pennant
- Encore (1951) as Tom Ramsay (Segment: "The Ant and the Grasshopper")
- Who Goes There! (1952) as Miles Cornwall
- The Sound Barrier (1952) as Tony Garthwaite
- Meet Me Tonight (1952) as Toby Cartwright: Ways and Means
- The Pickwick Papers (1952) as Mr. Jingle
- Grand National Night (1953) as Gerald Coates
- Forbidden Cargo (1954) as Insp. Michael Kenyon
- The Sea Shall Not Have Them (1954) as Flight Sgt. Singsby
- A Prize of Gold (1955) as Brian Hammell
- All for Mary (1955) as Capt. Clive Norton
- How to Murder a Rich Uncle (1957) as Henry
- Raintree County (1957) as Prof. Jerusalem Webster Stiles
- Count Five and Die (1957) as Major Julien Howard
- The Man Inside (1958) as Sam Carter
- Sapphire (1959) as Superintendent Robert Hazard
- The League of Gentlemen (1960) as Race
- The Trials of Oscar Wilde (1960) as Sir Edward Clarke
- Johnny Nobody (1961) as Father Carey
- The Informers (1963) as Chief Insp. John Edward Johnnoe
- Battle of Britain (1969) as Group Captain Hope
- The Virgin Soldiers (1969) as R.S.M. Raskin
- The Executioner (1970) as Colonel Scott
- Tales from the Crypt (1972) as Major William Rogers (segment 5 "Blind Alleys")
- The Great Waltz (1972) as Johann Strauss Sr.
- The Mackintosh Man (1973) as Soames-Trevelyan
- Silver Bears (1978) as Financial Mediator (uncredited)

=== As a director ===
- How to Murder a Rich Uncle (1957)
- Johnny Nobody (1961)

=== As a writer ===
- The Jack of Diamonds (1949)

=== As a narrator ===
- Arrivederci Roma (1958)
- Goal! (1966)
- The Year of Sir Ivor (1969)

== Theatre credits ==
=== As an actor ===
- The Life Machine (1932)
- Half a Crown (1934)
- Ringmaster (1935)
- Roulette (1935)
- The Lady of La Paz (1936)
- Madmoiselle (1936)
- George and Margaret (1937)
- Tony Draws a Horse (1939)
- Children to Bless You (1939)
- Fools Rush In (1946)
- To-morrow's Child (1946)
- Noose (1947)
- Who Goes There! (1951)
- Escapade (1953)
- Birthday Honours (1953)
- Green Room Rags (1954)
- The Remarkable Mr. Pennypacker (1955)
- The Egg (1957)
- Pleasure of His Company (1959)
- Settled Out of Court (1960)
- The Schoolmistress (1964)
- Present Laughter (1965)
- Best of Friends (1970)
- Reunion in Vienna (1971)
- Habeas Corpus (1974)
- The Pay Off (1974)
- Dear Daddy (1976)
- Peter Pan (1978)

=== As a director/stage manager ===
- No Way to Kill (1958)
- Not in the Book (1958)
- Pleasure of His Company (1959)
- Settled Out of Court (1960)
- Past Imperfect (1964)
- Present Laughter (1965)
- Relatively Speaking (1967)
- The Others (1967)
- Avanti! (1968)
- Out of the Question (1968)
- Trio (1969)
- Three (1970)
- The Pay Off (1974)
- Suite in Two Keys (1978)
- The Last of Mrs Cheyney (1980)

== Television ==
- Morning Departure (1946) as Lt-Cmdr. Stanford
- Zero One (1962–1965) as Alan Garnett
- It Takes a Thief – "Flowers from Alexander" (1969)
- Sunday Night Thriller – "Blunt Instrument" (1981) as Hugh Logan
