= Carrington V.C. (film) =

1954 British film by Anthony Asquith

- U.S. theatrical poster
- Directed by: Anthony Asquith
- Written by: John Hunter
- Based on: Carrington V.C. by Campbell Christie and Dorothy Christie
- Produced by: John Woolf; Teddy Baird
- Starring: David Niven; Margaret Leighton; Noelle Middleton
- Cinematography: Desmond Dickinson
- Edited by: Ralph Kemplen
- Production company: Romulus Films
- Distributed by: Independent Film Distributors
- Release date: 9 December 1954
- Running time: 105 minutes
- Country: United Kingdom
- Language: English
- Box office: £141,608 (UK)

Carrington V.C., also known as Court Martial in the United States, is a 1954 British legal drama film directed by Anthony Asquith and starring David Niven, Margaret Leighton and Noelle Middleton. Others in the cast include Allan Cuthbertson, Victor Maddern, Raymond Francis, Michael Bates, Laurence Naismith, Geoffrey Keen and Maurice Denham. Made by Romulus Films it was distributed by the company's Independent Film Distributors and released in the United States by Kingsley-International Pictures. It was adapted for the screen by John Hunter from the play of the same name by Campbell and Dorothy Christie. It was produced by Teddy Baird.

It was shot at Shepperton Studios near London with sets designed by the art director Wilfred Shingleton. The Victoria Cross worn by Niven in the film was that awarded to Arthur Henry Cross for service in World War I.

== Plot ==
Major Charles 'Copper' Carrington VC is arrested for embezzling £125 from his unit's safe. Other charges include going absent without leave from the base, and entertaining a woman officer in his room.

Defending himself at his court-martial, Carrington's case is that he had told his superior, Colonel Henniker, that he would take the money to advertise his complaint that he was owed a greater amount for expenses. He transferred £100 of it to his wife, Valerie, who was suicidal from financial worries, and left the base to ride in a horse race in which he bet the rest of the money on himself, hoping to pay back the cash. After he fell from his horse, his friend Captain Alison Graham tried to replace the money, but was denied access to the safe.

While bed-ridden from the fall, Carrington was visited by Graham to discuss the embezzlement. She was sitting in a chair fully dressed when Colonel Henniker stormed in, saying it was against regulations for males and females to be together in private quarters. He admits to having waited for some time after seeing Graham go to Carrington's room before following.

Henniker resents Carrington, who would be cleared if it were to be proved that he had forewarned Henniker of his intention. Henniker perjures himself by denying it.

Due to her ill-health, Carrington had not intended to call his wife Valerie as a witness, but does so after Henniker's testimony.

Before Valerie's appearance, Graham tells her that she had a one-night stand with Carrington, but that Carrington then insisted that a full affair would not be fair to anyone.

Valerie seeks revenge by denying Carrington had mentioned telling Colonel Henniker he planned to take the money. Carrington is about to read extracts from a letter she wrote to him in which she refers to his informing Henniker, when the judge insists the entire letter be examined to be accepted into evidence. As the letter also contains personal matters about Valerie's health, Carrington tears it up.

He is found guilty on all counts, and dismissed from the service, subject to the verdict's confirmation.

Carrington decides not to appeal the verdict, and his marriage is also over. He tells Graham that they could have a future together.

Gossiping, a telephonist reveals that she eavesdropped as Carrington told his wife what he had told Henniker. Her sergeant insists she give evidence. Hearing of this, Carrington decides he will appeal.

== Cast ==
- David Niven as Major Charles 'Copper' Carrington VC
- Margaret Leighton as Valerie Carrington
- Noelle Middleton as Captain Alison L. Graham
- Allan Cuthbertson as Colonel Henniker
- Victor Maddern as Bombardier Owen
- Raymond Francis as Major Jim Mitchell
- Geoffrey Keen as Brigadier Ayers Meadmore, presiding judge
- Newton Blick as Judge Advocate A. Tesker Terry
- Mark Dignam as Major Morse, prosecutor
- Robert Bishop as prosecutor's assistant
- Maurice Denham as Lieutenant Colonel B. R. Reeve
- Laurence Naismith as Major R. E. Panton
- Clive Morton as Lieutenant Colonel T. B. Huxford
- Michael Bates as Major A. T. M. Broke-Smith
- Stuart Saunders as Sergeant Crane
- John Chandos as Adjutant John Rawlinson
- Fred Griffiths as Fred, a soldier
- Johnnie Schofield as Hallam
- Vivienne Martin as Pte. Smith
- John Glyn-Jones as Evans, a reporter
- Timothy Bateson as soldier in NAAFI
- R.S.M. Brittain as Sergeant Major

== Production ==
The film was financed by the Woolf brothers, John and James.

== Awards and nominations ==
Carrington V.C. was nominated for the BAFTA Film Award for Best British Film and Best Film from any Source. David Niven was nominated for Best British Actor, and Margaret Leighton and Noelle Middleton were both nominated for Best British Actress.
