= Someone at the Door (1936 film) =

- Trade advertisement
- Directed by: Herbert Brenon
- Written by: Campbell Christie; Marjorie Deans; Jack Davis
- Based on: the play Someone at the Door by Campbell Christie & Dorothy Christie
- Produced by: Walter C. Mycroft
- Starring: Aileen Marson; Billy Milton; Noah Beery; Edward Chapman
- Cinematography: Bryan Langley
- Edited by: David Cousland
- Production company: British International Pictures
- Distributed by: Wardour Films (UK)
- Release date: 4 May 1936 (UK)
- Running time: 73 minutes
- Country: United Kingdom
- Language: English

Someone at the Door is a 1936 British drama film directed by Herbert Brenon and starring Aileen Marson, Billy Milton, Noah Beery, John Irwin and Edward Chapman. It was written by Campbell Christie, Marjorie Deans and Jack Davis based on the play by Campbell Christie and his wife Dorothy Christie, and was made as a quota quickie.

A journalist comes up with a scheme to boost his career by inventing a fake murder but soon becomes embroiled in trouble when a real killing takes place.

== Plot ==
When penniless Sally Martin inherits a decrepit country manor, formerly her childhood home, she moves in with her younger brother Ronald. An ambitious young journalist, Ronald comes up with an outlandish scheme to get his first big story. He plans to hide Sally in the house, to fake her death, and then get himself arrested for her murder. When Sally suddenly reappears at his trial, it will prove his innocence, and leave Ronald to supply his paper with an exclusive story. However, the siblings uncover a real mystery when they become mixed up with jewel thieves, whose loot is hidden in their house.

== Cast ==
- Billy Milton as Ronald Martin
- Aileen Marson as Sally Martin
- Noah Beery as Harry Kapel
- Edward Chapman as Price
- John Irwin as Bill Reid
- Hermione Gingold as Mrs Appleby
- Charles Mortimer as Sgt Spedding
- Edward Dignon as Soames
- Lawrence Hanray as Poole
- Jimmy Godden as PC O'Brien

== Critical reception ==
The Monthly Film Bulletin wrote: "The treatment is flippant, and the situations theatrical. Little scope for acting occurs. Aileen Marson and Billy Milton are rather exuberantly youthful; Noah Beery is conventionally villainous. The country house settings complete with secret panels, sliding doors, and underground rooms are quite effective."

Kine Weekly wrote: "Murder mystery comedy drama, pursued at a leisurely pace on traditional stage lines. The cast does its best in the circumstances, and the plot is not entirely with out ingenuity, but, unfortunately, the direction lacks discipline. There are times when the humour is unconsciously grave, and others when the drama and thrills unwittingly invite laughter. At its best the picture is a moderately entertaining two-feature programme proposition for not too sophisticated audiences."

David Parkinson wrote in The Radio Times: "Contrived only goes part way to describing this creaky thriller. ... Noah Beery Sr and Edward Chapman add a touch of spice as jewel thieves, but it's Billy Milton and Aileen Marson who are highly resistible as the hack and his accomplice sister."
