= Beatrice Campbell =

British actress (1922–1979)

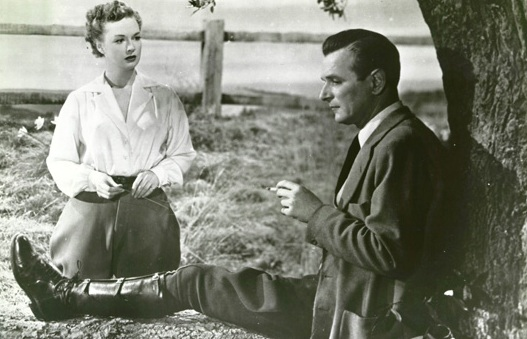
- Nigel Patrick and Beatrice Campbell in Grand National Night (1953).
- Born: Beatrice Josephine Campbell; 31 July 1922; County Down, Northern Ireland
- Died: 10 May 1979 (aged 56); London, England, UK
- Occupation: Actress
- Years active: 1946–1955
- Spouses: Michael Robert MacClancy (m. 1939; died 1942) Nigel Patrick (m. 1951)
- Children: 2

Beatrice Campbell (31 July 1922 – 10 May 1979) was a Northern Irish stage and film actress, born in County Down, Northern Ireland,

== Biography ==
=== Career ===
After a distinguished London stage career, Campbell entered film in the mid-1940s. She received positive notices internationally for her performances in Silent Dust (1949) and Last Holiday (1950), with Alec Guinness, which remains her best-known role.

=== Personal life ===
Her father, John Campbell, was the resident Magistrate of The Custody Court, Belfast.

Campbell was married twice. Her first marriage was to Squadron Leader Michael Robert MacClancy of No. 226 Squadron RAF, who died aged 22, on 12 April 1942 at RAF Hemswell when his aircraft crash landed. A Roman Catholic from Dublin and an alumnus of Belvedere College, he was the son of Michael MacClancy, M.R.C.V.S., and Nancy MacClancy, of Raheny. Her second marriage was to actor Nigel Patrick in 1951. They remained married until her death in 1979.

== Filmography ==
Year	Title	Role	Notes
1946	Wanted for Murder	Muriel	Uncredited
1946	The Laughing Lady		
1947	Meet Me at Dawn	Margot	
1947	The Hangman Waits	Usherette	
1948	My Brother Jonathan	Edie Martyn	
1948	Things Happen at Night	Joyce Prescott	
1949	Silent Dust	Joan Rawley	
1949	Now Barabbas	Kitty	
1950	No Place for Jennifer	Paula	
1950	Last Holiday	Sheila Rockingham	
1950	The Mudlark	Lady Emily Prior	
1951	Laughter in Paradise	Lucille Grayson	
1951	The House in the Square/I'll Never Forget You	Kate Pettigrew	
1953	Grand National Night	Joyce Penrose	
1953	The Master of Ballantrae	Lady Alison	
1955	The Cockleshell Heroes	Mrs. Ruddock	
