= Campbell Christie (writer) =

British playwright and screenwriter (1893–1963)

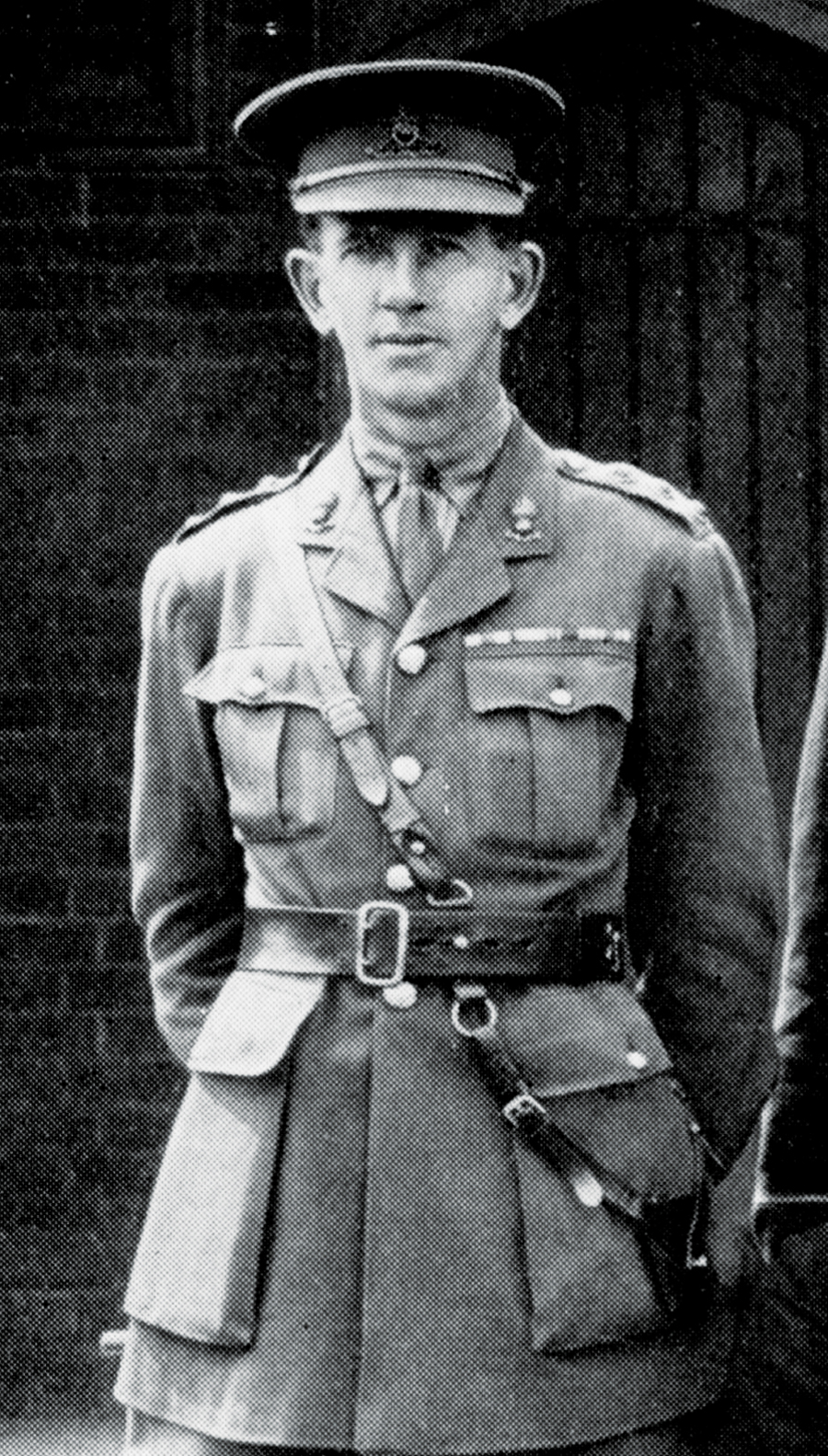
Christie, then captain, at the Royal Artillery Academy, Woolwich in October 1923

Major General Campbell Manning Christie MC (8 October 1893 – 20 June 1963) was a British playwright and screenwriter who frequently collaborated with his wife Dorothy Christie on plays such as Carrington V.C., His Excellency and Someone at the Door.

== Early life ==
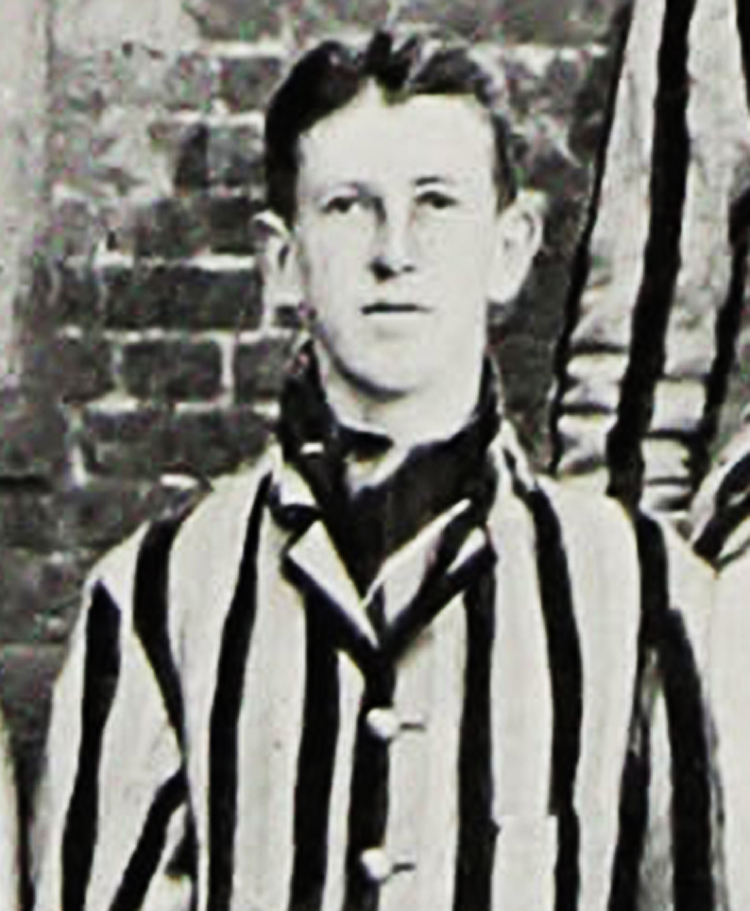
Christie as a member of the cricket team at the Royal Artillery Academy, Woolwich in 1912

Campbell Manning Christie was born at Murree in the Punjab on October 8, 1893, the younger son of Archibald Christie. He attended Clifton Preparatory School from April 1901 to June 1902 and then re-entered Clifton College as a junior in January 1905, and left in September 1911.

His brother, Archie Christie, married Agatha Christie.

== Career ==
From July 11, 1940 to October 21, 1941 Christie was a brigadier and Commander, Royal Artillery of 53 (Welch) Division and from October 22, 1941 to December 11, 1942 was brigadier, Royal Artillery, VIII Corps. As a major general he was General Officer Commanding, Anti-Aircraft Defences, Malta from December 12, 1942 to May 23, 1944. On May 16, 1946 he retired as a major general. During his career he received the Military Cross, 1914–15 Star, British War Medal, Victory Medal, 1939–45 Star, Africa Star, War Medal 1939–45 and Defence Medal.

== Personal life ==
Christie married Dorothy Ethel Casson Walker, the daughter of Sir George Casson Walker, KCSI in 1914 and they had one daughter.

When Ethel Dorothea Walker was born on 10 June 1896, in Lahore, Punjab, India, her father, George Casson Walker, was 41 and her mother, Fanny Coates, was 40. She married Campbell Manning Christie in 1914, in Steyning, Sussex, England, United Kingdom. She died on 1 March 1990, in Reading, Berkshire, England, United Kingdom, at the age of 93.

Christie was found dead in the gas-filled kitchen of his home at West Byfleet, Surrey, on 20 June 1962 at the age of 69.

== Selected filmography ==
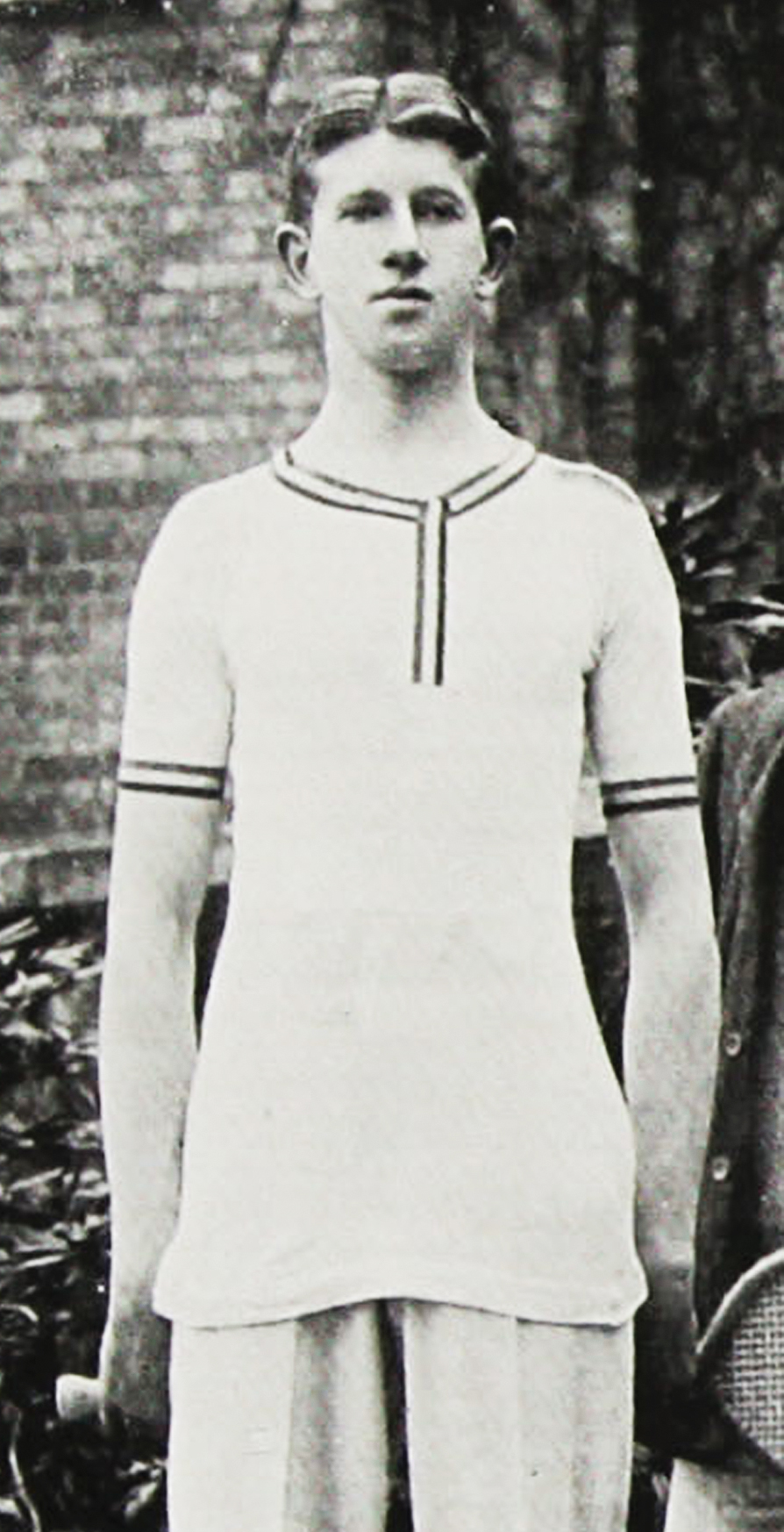
Gentleman Cadet Christie after winning the rackets for the Royal Artillery Academy, Woolwich against the Royal Military College, Sandhurst, August 1913

- Jassy (1947)
- Carrington V.C. (1955)
- The Long Arm (1956)

== Selected plays ==
- Someone at the Door (1935)
- Grand National Night (1945)
- His Excellency (1950)
- Carrington V.C. (1953)
