= Once in a Million =

1936 film by Arthur B. Woods

- American poster
- Directed by: Arthur B. Woods
- Written by: Jack Davies; Geoffrey Kerr; Max Kester
- Produced by: Walter C. Mycroft
- Starring: Charles 'Buddy' Rogers; Mary Brian; Jimmy Godden
- Cinematography: Ronald Neame
- Edited by: George Black Jr.
- Music by: Harry Acres
- Production company: British International Pictures
- Distributed by: Wardour Films
- Release date: 13 March 1936
- Running time: 79 minutes
- Country: United Kingdom
- Language: English

Once in a Million (also known as Weekend Millionaire) is a 1936 British comedy film directed by Arthur B. Woods and starring Charles 'Buddy' Rogers, Mary Brian and Jimmy Godden. It was written by Jack Davies, Geoffrey Kerr and Max Kester, and was shot at the Welwyn Studios of British International Pictures near London with sets were designed by art director Cedric Dawe.

== Plot ==
A bank clerk is left to guard a million pounds and fantasises about how he would spend the money.

== Cast ==
- Charles "Buddy" Rogers as Pierre
- Mary Brian as Suzanne
- W.H. Berry as Gallivert
- Haver and Lee as Joe and Chief
- Norah Gale as Princess
- Billy Milton as Prince
- Charles Carson asPresident
- Nadine March as Josette
- Iris Hoey as Mrs. Fenwick
- Veronica Rose as Caroline
- Jimmy Godden as Plume

== Reception ==
The Monthly Film Bulletin wrote: "A fantasy that owes something to Rene Clair's Le Million. ... Arthur Woods directs with a nice regard for movement and for the ridiculous, and the photography is polished and lustrous. The film never actually bursts into song, though it seems never very far off in the fantastic air in which one expects anything."

Kine Weekly wrote: "Snappy, inconsequential, romantic comedy, served with a French dressing in congenial surroundings. The actual story makes few excursions into new territory, but it is played with such infectious enthusiasm by an attractive cast that it has no difficulty in covering its convenient footage with gay entertainment of immediate popularity."

Variety wrote: "Pleasing, if improbable, story ... entertainment which should please any audience."
