= Yes, Madam? =

1938 film

- Directed by: Norman Lee
- Written by: K.R.G. Browne (play); William Freshman; Clifford Grey; Bert Lee
- Produced by: Walter C. Mycroft
- Starring: Bobby Howes; Diana Churchill; Wylie Watson
- Cinematography: Walter J. Harvey
- Edited by: Walter Stokvis
- Music by: Harry Acres
- Production company: Associated British Picture Corporation
- Distributed by: Associated British Film Distributors
- Release date: November 1938
- Running time: 77 minutes
- Country: United Kingdom
- Language: English
- Budget: £39,784

Yes, Madam? is a 1938 British musical comedy film directed by Norman Lee and starring Bobby Howes, Diana Churchill and Wylie Watson.

== Background ==
The film was adapted from a play by K. R. G. Browne, itself based on a novel by the same author. The film was shot at Elstree Studios, with sets designed by the art director Cedric Dawe.

== Plot ==
Two cousins, Billy Quinton and Sally Gaunt, have to spend a month in service to qualify for an inheritance from an eccentric uncle. They find themselves in the same household, as valet/chauffeur and as maid, where they are tracked down by their arch-enemy Tony Tolliver, who will get the money should either of the cousins fail in their task by getting the sack. Tony therefore tries various schemes to get them sacked – succeeding, but still failing to get the legacy.

== Cast ==
- Bobby Howes as Bill Quinton
- Diana Churchill as Sally Gault
- Wylie Watson as Albert Peabody, a retired button manufacturer
- Bertha Belmore as Emily Peabody, his unmarried sister
- Vera Pearce as Pansy Beresford, an actress
- Billy Milton as Tony Tolliver
- Fred Emney as Sir Charles Drake-Drake
- Cameron Hall as Catlett, former burglar, now manservant to Tolliver
- Geoffrey Sumner as Scoffin
- Arthur Hambling as a police constable

== Music and dance sequences ==
Set pieces taken from the stage production included a scene with a 'sloshed Emney', Czecho-Slovakian Love - "Here beneath the white lights gleaming above" (Pansy and Bill) and 'Yes, Madam' - "I'm in love, I confess" (Bill and Sally).

== Bibliography ==
- Wood, Linda. British Films, 1927-1939. British Film Institute, 1986.
