= Housemaster (film) =

- Directed by: Herbert Brenon
- Written by: Ian Hay (play); Dudley Leslie; Elizabeth Meehan
- Produced by: Walter C. Mycroft
- Starring: Otto Kruger; Diana Churchill; Phillips Holmes; Joyce Barbour
- Cinematography: Otto Kanturek
- Edited by: Flora Newton
- Music by: Harry Acres
- Production company: Associated British Picture Corporation
- Distributed by: Associated British Film Distributors
- Release date: 31 January 1938
- Running time: 100 minutes
- Country: United Kingdom
- Language: English

Housemaster (also known as The Housemaster) is a 1938 British comedy drama film directed by Herbert Brenon and starring Otto Kruger, Diana Churchill and Phillips Holmes. It was written by Ian Hay, Dudley Leslie and Elizabeth Meehan based on the 1936 play of the same name by Hay, and was made by ABPC at its Elstree Studios.

== Plot ==
When three young women come to stay at an elite public school, they cause disruption amongst the male students and teachers.

== Cast ==
- Otto Kruger as Charles Donkin
- Diana Churchill as Rosemary Faringdon
- Phillips Holmes as Philip de Pourville
- Joyce Barbour as Barbara Fane
- Rene Ray as Chris Faringdon
- Kynaston Reeves as The Rev. Edmund Ovington
- Walter Hudd as Frank Hastings
- Michael Shepley as Victor Beamish
- John Wood as Flossie Nightingale
- Cecil Parker as Sir Berkely Nightingale
- Henry Hepworth as Bimbo Faringdon
- Rosamund Barnes as Button Faringdon
- Laurence Kitchin as Crump
- Jimmy Hanley as Travers

== Reception ==
=== Box office ===
Kine Weekly reported the film did well at the British box office in August 1938.

=== Critical ===
The Monthly Film Bulletin wrote: "The superb acting of Otto Kruger, in the part of Donkin, invests the main theme with a dignity and reality which makes a strange contrast to the spasms of exaggerated and rather tiresome farce. The acting is uneven. Some of the settings are extremely effective; although the Cathedral-cum-chapel architecture has been slightly overdone."

Kine Weekly wrote: "Here we have a kindly, knowledgeable and refreshingly intimate comedy of English public school life. It is adapted from Ian Kay's stage success, and enjoys to the full the author's flair for good character drawing. Much wholesome, true-blue, light entertainment lies in the accuracy of the types, both juvenile and adult, and the authenticity of the atmosphere and environment. The typically English sentiment and humour have polish without being snobbish. Family appeal is immense."

Variety wrote: "Satisfying commercial hit for England, and not catering to popular audiences by resorting to unnecessary horseplay. ... Thing that strikes the spectator is the well-knit progression of the tale, undoubtedly due to the handling of the picture by a well-seasoned Hollywood director, Herbert Brenon."
