= The Dominant Sex =

1937 British film by Herbert Brenon

- Directed by: Herbert Brenon
- Written by: John Fernald; Vina de Vesci
- Based on: play by Michael Egan
- Produced by: Walter C. Mycroft
- Starring: Phillips Holmes; Diana Churchill; Romney Brent; Carol Goodner
- Cinematography: Walter J. Harvey
- Edited by: Flora Newton
- Music by: Harry Acres
- Production company: British International Pictures
- Distributed by: Associated British Picture Corporation
- Release date: 26 January 1937
- Running time: 74 minutes
- Country: United Kingdom
- Language: English

The Dominant Sex is a 1937 British comedy film directed by Herbert Brenon and starring Phillips Holmes, Diana Churchill and Romney Brent. It was written by John Fernald and Vina de Vesci based on a play by Michael Egan, and was made by British International Pictures at its main Elstree Studios. The film's art direction was by Cedric Dawe.

== Plot ==
Young married couple Dick and Angela Shale are always arguing. Dick wants to market his invention, to pay for him to farm his own land, whereas Angela wants him to get a safe job in a big company. Angela works in an office, whereas Dick wants her to stop working and start a family. Angela agrees to do as Dick wants, as long as Dick does what she wants.

== Cast ==
- Phillips Holmes as Dick Shale
- Diana Churchill as Angela Shale
- Romney Brent as Joe Clayton
- Carol Goodner as Gwen Clayton
- Billy Milton as Alec Winstone
- Hugh Miller as Philip Carson
- Kathleen Kelly as Mary
- Olga Edwardes as Lucy Webster
- Charles Paton as Mr. Webster

== Reception ==
The Monthly Film Bulletin wrote: "This film is a straightforward adaptation of the successful stage play, and no attempt is made to disguise its origin. The result is that there is much more dialogue than action. As the dialogue is both clever and witty this does not detract from its entertainment value."

Kine Weekly wrote: "Michael Egan's successtul stage play has been very well transferred to the screen. There is not much action, but the dialogue is so clever and the theme so human and homely that one does not notice the lack."
