= Hold My Hand (film) =

- Theatrical release poster
- Directed by: Thornton Freeland
- Written by: William Freshman; Clifford Grey; Bert Lee
- Based on: play Hold My Hand by Stanley Lupino
- Produced by: Walter C. Mycroft
- Starring: Stanley Lupino; Fred Emney; Polly Ward; Sally Gray
- Cinematography: Otto Kanturek
- Music by: Marr Mackie; Harry Acres
- Production company: Associated British Picture Corporation
- Distributed by: Associated British Picture Corporation
- Release date: August 1938
- Running time: 76 minutes
- Country: United Kingdom
- Language: English
- Budget: £39,773

Hold My Hand is a 1938 British musical comedy film directed by Thornton Freeland and starring Stanley Lupino, Fred Emney and Barbara Blair. It was written by William Freshman, Clifford Grey and Bert Lee based on the 1932 musical play of the same title by Lupino.

== Plot ==
A wealthy man buys a newspaper, resulting in a series of romantic entanglements.

== Cast ==
- Stanley Lupino as Eddie Marston
- Fred Emney as Lord Milchester
- Barbara Blair as Jane Howard
- Sally Gray as Helen
- Polly Ward as Paula Pond
- Bertha Belmore as Lady Milchester
- Jack Melford as Pop Currie
- John Wood as Bob Crane
- Syd Walker as Inspector Rogers
- Arthur Rigby as Norman Love
- Gibb McLaughlin as bank manager

== Critical reception ==
The Monthly Film Bulletin wrote: "Hilarious comedy about love and money. ...Stanley Lupino and Fred Emney keep the comedy going and are particularly good in the absurd cat burglary. ...The plot does not matter."

Kine Weekly wrote: "Here we have fun and games handled in hardy English musical comedy stage tradition, There is not a great deal of originality in the picture's make-up, neither does it possess rapier wit, but the acting and direction have tireless exuberance, and this, plus a pleasant mead of tuncful song, keeps the artless yet topical fooling up to concert pitch."

TV Guide rated the film two out of five stars, calling it an "Occasionally amusing farce."
