= Sensation (1936 film) =

1936 film

- Directed by: Brian Desmond Hurst
- Written by: Dudley Leslie; Marjorie Deans; William Freshman
- Based on: play Murder Gang by Basil Dean & George Munro
- Produced by: Walter C. Mycroft
- Starring: John Lodge; Diana Churchill
- Cinematography: Walter J. Harvey
- Edited by: James Corbett
- Production company: British International Pictures
- Distributed by: Associated British Picture Corporation (UK)
- Release dates: 17 December 1936 (London, UK); 18 December 1940 (US)
- Running time: 66 minutes
- Country: United Kingdom
- Language: English

Sensation is a 1936 British crime film directed by Brian Desmond Hurst and starring John Lodge, Diana Churchill, Francis Lister and Felix Aylmer. It was written by Dudley Leslie, Marjorie Deans and William Freshman, based on the 1935 play Murder Gang by Basil Dean and George Munro.

== Scenario ==
A crime reporter who solves a murder case using a piece of evidence he found amongst the victim's possessions.

== Cast ==
- John Lodge as Pat Heston
- Diana Churchill as Masie Turnpit
- Francis Lister as Richard Grainger
- Joan Marion as Mrs Grainger
- Margaret Vyner as Claire Lindsay
- Jerry Verno as Spikey
- Richard Bird as Henry Belcher
- Athene Seyler as Madame Henry
- Dennis Wyndham as Spurge
- Henry Oscar as Superintendent Stainer
- Anthony Holles as Clarke
- Martin Walker as Dimmitt
- Sybil Grove as Mrs Spurge
- Leslie Perrins as Strange
- Felix Aylmer as Lord Bouverie

== Reception ==
The Monthly Film Bulletin wrote: "The plot is a series of dramatic situations with very little characterisation. There is some amusing dialogue of the wise-cracking type. The acting is competent. Cutting is rather more imaginative than in the average film of this type."

Kine Weekly wrote: "Spectacular arresting murder mystery drama played against an authentic newspaper background. The cleverly written story, which incidentally mirrors with engrossing fidelity Fleet Street's reactions to crime, unravels with keen deliberation and, as the net slowly closes around the culprit, so do the tensity of the drama and the poignancy of the human factor increase in smooth box-office ratio."

Writing for The Spectator in 1937, Graham Greene gave the film a poor review, faulting the "bad casting, bad story construction, [and] uncertain editing". While praising the acting of Holles, Seyler, and Marion, Greene found that the rest of the cast handicapped the director, and that the story lost its authenticity "in false trails, in an absurd love-story, in humour based on American film, and in the complete unreality of the 'murder gang'."
