= Lucky to Me =

- Directed by: Thomas Bentley
- Written by: Arthur Rigby (play); Clifford Grey
- Produced by: Walter C. Mycroft
- Starring: Stanley Lupino; Phyllis Brooks; Barbara Blair; Gene Sheldon
- Cinematography: Derick Williams
- Edited by: Monica Kimick
- Music by: Noel Gay; Harry Acres
- Production company: Associated British Picture Corporation
- Distributed by: Associated British Film Distributors
- Release date: November 1939
- Running time: 69 minutes
- Country: United Kingdom
- Language: English

Lucky to Me is a 1939 British musical comedy film directed by Thomas Bentley and starring Stanley Lupino, Phyllis Brooks and Barbara Blair. It was based on Lupino's own 1928 stage show So This is Love which he had co-written with actor Arthur Rigby. The film was made by ABPC at its Elstree Studios. It was the last film of Lupino who had made a string of successful musical comedies during the Thirties.

== Cast ==
- Stanley Lupino as 'Potty' Potts
- Phyllis Brooks as Pamela Stuart
- Barbara Blair as Minnie 'Mousey' Jones
- Gene Sheldon as Hap Hazard
- Antoinette Cellier as Kay Summers
- David Hutcheson as Peter Malden
- Bruce Seton as Lord 'Tiny' Tyneside
- Geoffrey Sumner as Fanshaw
- Rosamund John as Girl
- Gordon McLeod as Doherty
- Julien Mitchell as Butterworth
- Edward Underdown as Malden's friend

== Bibliography ==
- Low, Rachael. History of the British Film: Filmmaking in 1930s Britain. George Allen & Unwin, 1985 .
