= Oh Boy! (1938 film) =

1938 film by Albert de Courville

- Directed by: Albert de Courville
- Written by: Douglas Furber; Dudley Leslie
- Produced by: Walter C. Mycroft
- Starring: Albert Burdon; Mary Lawson; Bernard Nedell
- Cinematography: Claude Friese-Greene
- Edited by: Flora Newton
- Music by: Harry Acres
- Production company: Associated British Picture Corporation
- Distributed by: Associated British Picture Corporation
- Release date: 9 February 1938
- Running time: 76 minutes
- Country: United Kingdom
- Language: English

Oh Boy! is a 1938 British comedy film directed by Albert de Courville and starring Albert Burdon, Mary Lawson, and Bernard Nedell. It was written by Douglas Furber and Dudley Leslie and was made at Elstree Studios by ABPC. The film's sets were designed by the art director John Mead.

== Synopsis ==
Percy Flower, a young chemist, takes his girlfriend to watch his Beefeater father on parade at the Tower of London, but she is stolen away by an assertive, taller man. Percy is then given a secret formula by an eccentric inventor which makes him extremely confident, strong and energetic. However once Percy starts suffering the side effect, which reduces him back to childhood, his father urgently tries to find the Professor again to get the antidote. Eventually Percy is restored to his true self, managing both to win back his girlfriend and to foil a plot by some American gangsters to steal the Crown Jewels.

== Cast ==
- Albert Burdon as Percy Flower
- Mary Lawson as June Messenger
- Bernard Nedell as Angelo Tonelli
- Jay Laurier as Horatio Flower
- Robert Cochran as Albert Bolsover
- Edmon Ryan as Butch
- Maire O'Neill as Mrs. Baggs
- Syd Walker as Sergeant
- Charles Carson as Governor
- Jerry Verno as shopwalker
- John Wood as man
- Billy Milton as conductor
- Edmund D'Alby
- Boris Ranevsky

== Reception ==
The Monthly Film Bulletin wrote: "'We see Albert Burdon in a lengthy series of scenes dressed in children's and babies' clothes and the incongruity of such a spectacle proves an unfailing source of laughter to a certain type of mind. On this situation, and on little else the humour of the film depends, although A. Burdon's clowning in these scenes reaches a high order of realism. Neither acting, dialogue nor the sets are convincing. The supporting players canter dispiritedly through their parts."

Kine Weekly wrote: "One swallow does not make a summer, neither does one good gag turn an otherwise thin comedy ito first-class entertainment. Apart from the one laughable high spot, the film is crammed with chestnuts and cheap lines. According to the renters, this type of film needs an audience; maybe they're right, but how to get one with such material is a problem that is unlikely to be solved satisfactorily at the box-office. It is kids' stuff, pure and very simple."

Picturegoer wrote: "The production is weak as a whole there being only one bright sequence, when the hero, played conscientiously by Albert Burdon, returns physically and mentally to babyhood. As a gangster, Bernard Nedell is good, but the rest do not add much to the gaiety of the proceedings."

Picture Show wrote: "There is little real comedy in this comedy ... Acting and direction fair."
