= Phillips Holmes =

American actor (1907–1942)

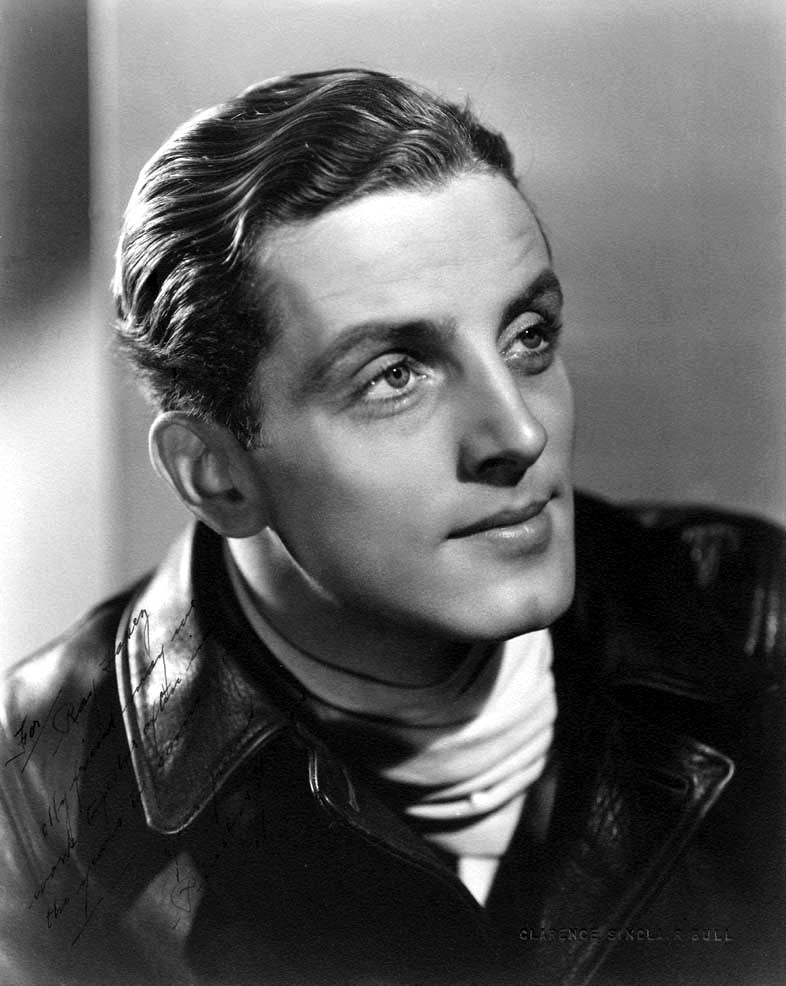
- Holmes in 1933
- Born: Phillips Raymond Holmes; July 22, 1907; Grand Rapids, Michigan, U.S.
- Died: August 12, 1942 (aged 35); Ontario, Canada
- Resting place: Gate of Heaven Cemetery
- Other name: Phillips R. Holmes
- Education: Trinity College; University of Grenoble; Princeton University
- Occupation: Actor
- Father: Taylor Holmes

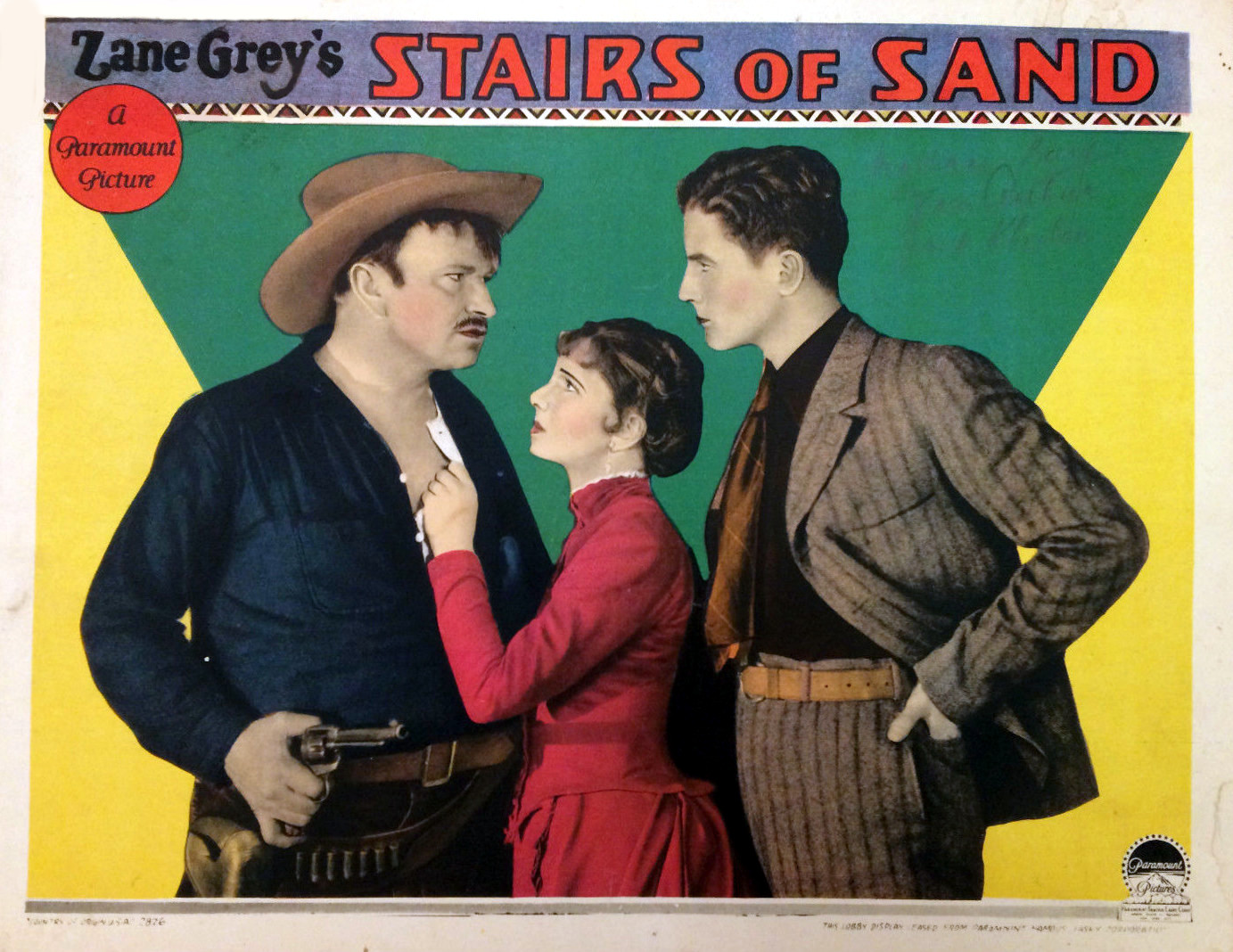
Lobby card with Wallace Beery, Jean Arthur and Holmes in 1929

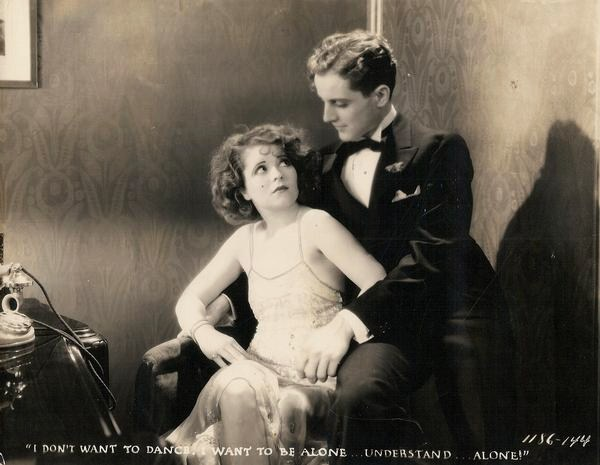
Clara Bow and Holmes in The Wild Party (1929)

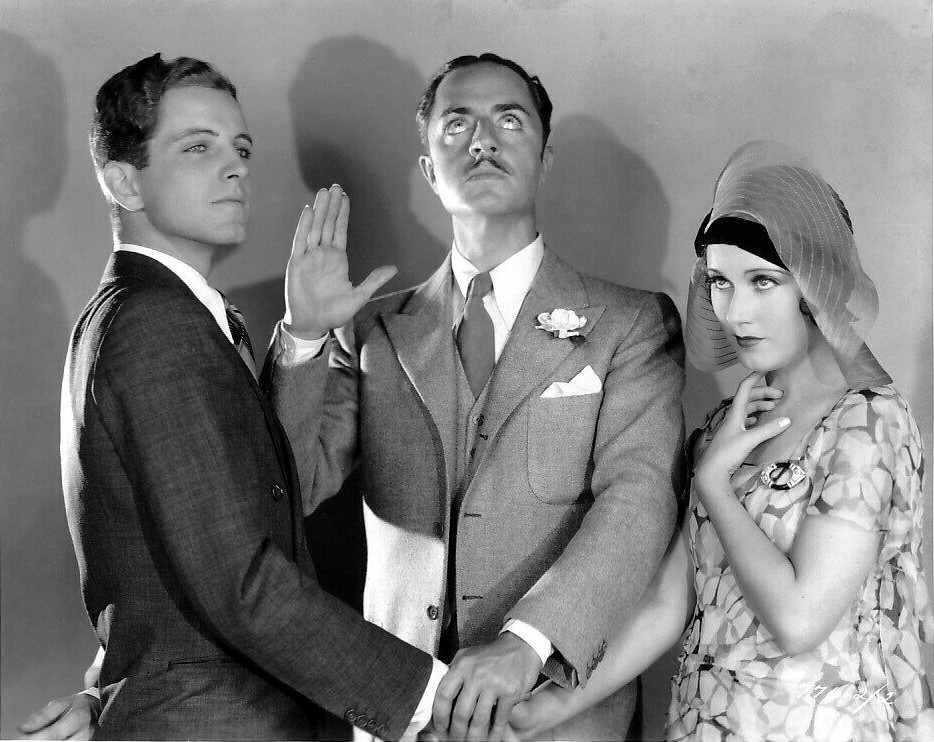
With William Powell and Fay Wray in Pointed Heels (1929)

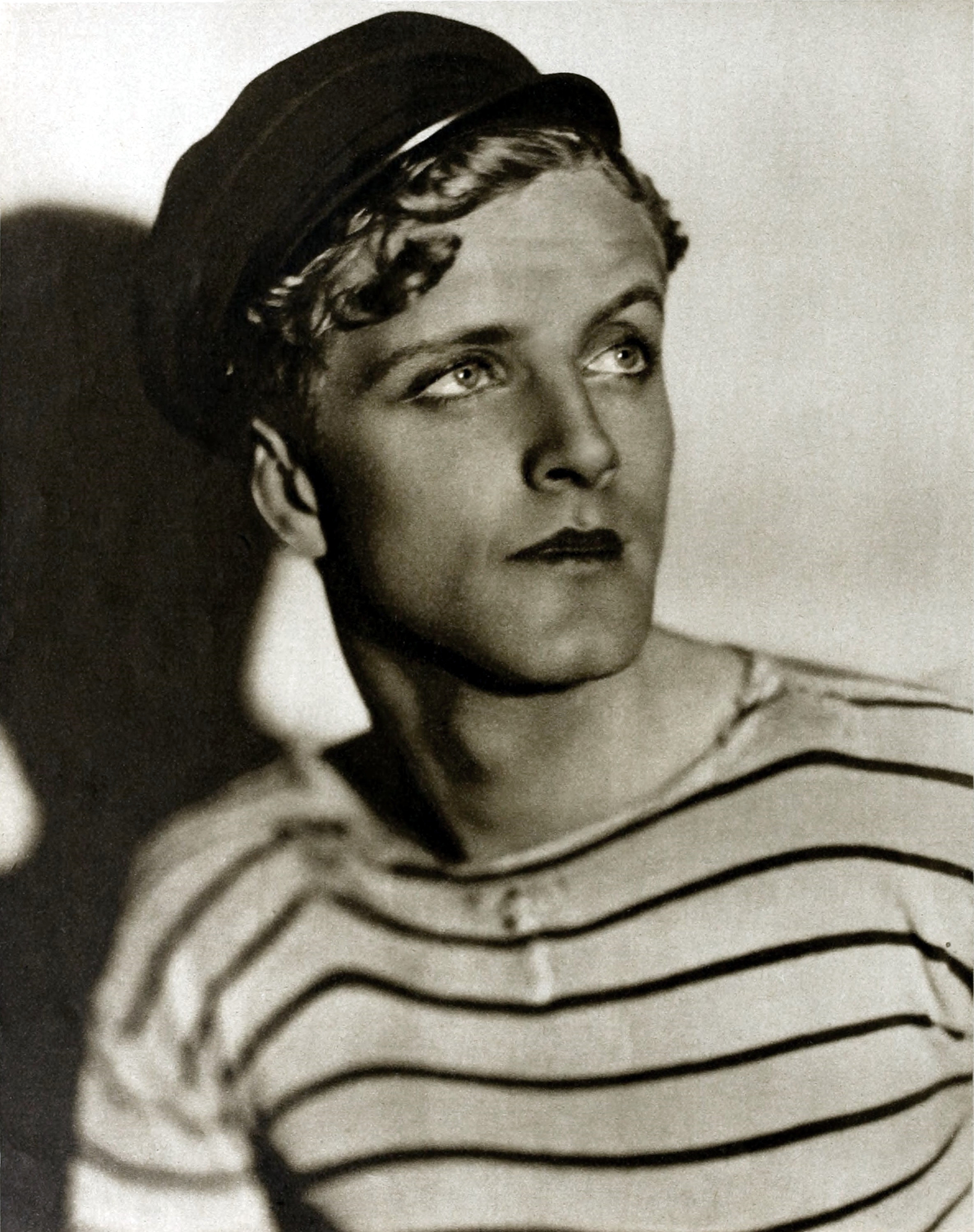
Phillips Holmes in Her Man (1930)

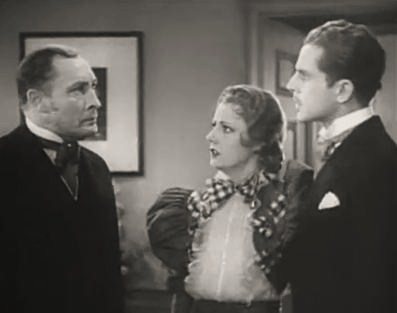
Lionel Atwill, Irene Dunne and Holmes in The Secret of Madame Blanche (1933)

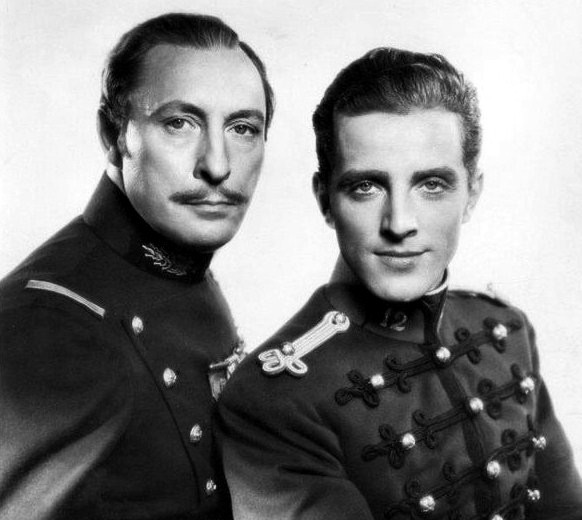
With Lionel Atwill in Nana (1934)

Phillips Raymond Holmes (July 22, 1907 – August 12, 1942) was an American actor. For his contributions to the film industry, he was posthumously given a star on the Hollywood Walk of Fame in 1960.

== Early life, education and career ==
Born in Grand Rapids, Michigan, the son of Edna Phillips and stage star Taylor Holmes, Holmes enjoyed a privileged childhood, attending Harvard Military Academy in Los Angeles and Newman Prep School. He received his higher education at Trinity College, Cambridge in England, the University of Grenoble in France, and a year at Princeton University where he was spotted in the undergraduate crowd during the filming of Frank Tuttle's Varsity in 1928 and offered a screen test. In the early 1930s, he became a popular leading man, playing leads in a few important productions, notably in Josef von Sternberg's An American Tragedy (1931) and Ernst Lubitsch's Broken Lullaby (1932).

At Paramount, he starred in melodrama and comedy. In 1933, his contract with Paramount ran out and he moved to MGM for one year. As the decade progressed, Holmes' career declined, and he appeared in a few box-office failures, including Sam Goldwyn's poorly received Nana (1934). His last American movie was General Spanky (1936). In 1938, he appeared in two UK movies. Housemaster was his last film, and he returned to acting on stage in the United States.

== Scandal ==
In 1933, Holmes was driving with actress Mae Clarke when he crashed into a parked car. Clarke, who suffered a broken jaw and facial cuts, sued Holmes for US$21,500 (equivalent to $534,737 in 2025), claiming that he had been driving while drunk. Clarke dropped the suit when Holmes agreed to pay her medical expenses. The changes in her face adversely affected her burgeoning career in the long run (in 1931, she had played both Henry Frankenstein's fiancee in Frankenstein and was the recipient of half a grapefruit in the face from James Cagney in The Public Enemy).

== Military service and death ==
At the start of World War II, he joined the Royal Canadian Air Force on December 26, 1941. He was killed, aged 35, in a mid-air collision between 2 Avro Anson I twin-engine training aircraft in northwest Ontario, Canada. Recorded by the Commonwealth War Graves Commission under a younger age of 31, he was buried at the Cemetery of the Gate of Heaven, Hawthorne, New York.

== Legacy ==
Holmes has a star on the Hollywood Walk of Fame.

== Filmography ==
- Uneasy Money (1918) as Caddy (film debut, uncredited)
- Her Market Value (1925) as Party Boy (uncredited)
- Varsity (1928) as Middlebrook
- His Private Life (1928) as Pierrot (uncredited)
- The Wild Party (1929) as Phil
- The Studio Murder Mystery (1929) as Young Actor (uncredited)
- Stairs of Sand (1929) as Adam Wansfell
- Illusion (1929) as Eric's Friend in Audience (uncredited)
- The Return of Sherlock Holmes (1929) as Roger Longmore
- Pointed Heels (1929) as Donald Ogden
- Only the Brave (1930) as Capt. Robert Darrington
- Paramount on Parade (1930) as Hunter - Episode 'Dream Girl'
- The Devil's Holiday (1930) as David Stone
- Grumpy (1930) as Ernest Heron
- Her Man (1930) as Dan Keefe
- The Dancers (1930) as Tony
- Man to Man (1930) as Michael Bolton
- The Criminal Code (1931) as Robert Graham
- Stolen Heaven (1931) as Joe Bartlett
- Confessions of a Co-Ed (1931) as Dan Carter
- An American Tragedy (1931) as Clyde Griffiths
- Two Kinds of Women (1932) as Joseph Gresham Jr.
- Broken Lullaby (1932) as Paul Renard
- Night Court (1932) as Mike Thomas
- Make Me a Star (1932) as Phillips Holmes (uncredited)
- 70,000 Witnesses (1932) as Buck Buchan
- The Secret of Madame Blanche (1933) as Leonard St. John
- Men Must Fight (1933) as Bob Seward
- Looking Forward (1933) as Michael Service
- Storm at Daybreak (1933) as Csaholyi
- The Big Brain (1933) as Terry Van Sloan
- Dinner at Eight (1933) as Ernest DeGraff
- Beauty for Sale (1933) as Burt Barton
- Penthouse (1933) as Tom Siddall
- Stage Mother (1933) as Lord Aylesworth
- Nana (1934) as Lieutenant George Muffat
- Caravan (1934) as Lt. von Tokay
- Private Scandal (1934) as Cliff Barry
- Million Dollar Ransom (1934) as Stanton Casserly
- No Ransom (1934) as Tom Wilson
- Great Expectations (1934) as Pip
- Ten Minute Alibi (1935) as Colin Derwent
- The Divine Spark (1935) as Vincenzo Bellini
- Chatterbox (1936) as Philip 'Phil' Greene Jr
- The House of a Thousand Candles (1936) as Tony Carleton
- General Spanky (1936) as Marshall Valient
- The Dominant Sex (1937) as Dick Shale
- Housemaster (1938) - Philip de Pourville

== See also ==
- List of alumni of Trinity College, Cambridge
- List of people from Grand Rapids, Michigan
- List of Princeton University people
- Lists of actors
