= A Star Fell from Heaven (1936 film) =

- Trade advertisement
- Directed by: Paul Merzbach
- Written by: Jack Davies; Marjorie Deans; Gerald Elliott; Val Guest; Geoffrey Kerr; Dudley Leslie
- Produced by: Walter C. Mycroft
- Starring: Joseph Schmidt; Florine McKinney; Billy Milton
- Cinematography: Ronald Neame
- Edited by: Flora Newton
- Music by: Hans May
- Production company: British International Pictures
- Distributed by: Wardour Films
- Release date: 9 June 1936
- Running time: 70 minutes
- Country: United Kingdom
- Language: English

A Star Fell from Heaven is a 1936 British comedy film directed by Paul Merzbach and starring Joseph Schmidt, Florine McKinney and Billy Milton. It was written by Jack Davies, Marjorie Deans, Gerald Elliott, Val Guest, Geoffrey Kerr and Dudley Leslie, and was made at Elstree Studios. It is a remake of the 1934 Austrian film of the same name which also starred Schmidt.

== Plot ==
Joseph Reiner is encouraged to seek fame as a screen singer by Anne, with whom he is in love, but his shyness causes him to fail his first audition. Anne then seeks help from Willy Wass, another of her admirers, who is the dresser to famous film star Douglas Lincoln. When Lincoln's manager Tomson mistakes Joseph's voice for Lincoln's, Lincoln and Tomson fight, and Lincoln loses his voice. Joseph gets the job as his as unseen vocal substitute.

== Cast ==
- Joseph Schmidt as Josef Reiner
- Florine McKinney as Anne Heinmeyer
- Billy Milton as Douglas Lincoln
- W. H. Berry as Tomson
- George Graves as Fischer
- Steven Geray as Willi Wass
- Judy Kelly as Flora
- C. Denier Warren as Starfel
- Iris Hoey as Frau Heinmeyer
- Bruce Lester as Winkler
- Eliot Makeham as music professor
- Hindle Edgar as Schneider
- Jimmy Godden
- Aubrey Mallalieu as doctor

== Production ==
The film's sets were designed by the art director David Rawnsley.

== Reception ==
The Monthly Film Bulletin wrote: "A refreshing musical with a new plot. ... The direction has nearly produced a parody of the average musical film. The title of the company is Miracle Films – 'If you see a good film, it's a Miracle.' Settings are dull and photography fair. There is plenty of comedy supplied by George Graves as the film director, who is in good form and is well supported by W. H. Berry and Steve Geray. Feminine charm is supplied by Florence McKinney, to whom all the men are attracted. A novel, light entertainment, well above the average: many will be interested in the exposure of the technique of faking."

Kine Weekly wrote: "A refreshingly inconsequential romantic musical comedy, a scintillating satire on the eccentricities of Filmland, set in a pseudo-Continental atmosphere of captivating picture-postcard prettiness and decorated with a delightful musical score, magnificently rendered by Joseph Schmidt, the famous pocket tenor. Not only are humour and song blended with delicate showmanship, but wedded to this irresistible union, born of keen, enthusiastic direction, is a love interest of whimsical tenderness light as a cloud, yet rich in bouquet, the film gives all that is best in screen operetta. Outstanding light entertainment for all classes."
