= Dudley Leslie =

British screenwriter and playwright (1905–1998)

- Born: 25 September 1905; London, United Kingdom
- Died: January 1998 (aged 92); Isle of Wight, United Kingdom
- Occupation: Writer
- Years active: 1936-1980 (film)

Dudley Leslie (1905–1998) was a British screenwriter and playwright. He was on the jury for the 1958 Cannes Film Festival.

He co-wrote the 1948 play The Human Touch with J. Lee Thompson. He was married to the writer Audrey Erskine-Lindop with whom he collaborated a number of times.

== Selected filmography ==
- Sensation (1936)
- Living Dangerously (1936)
- A Star Fell from Heaven (1936)
- Glamorous Night (1937)
- Jane Steps Out (1938)
- Marigold (1938)
- Black Limelight (1938)
- Housemaster (1938)
- Star of the Circus (1938)
- Oh Boy! (1938)
- Hell's Cargo (1939)
- The Outsider (1939)
- Three Silent Men (1940)
- Golden Madonna (1949)
- The Tall Headlines (1952)
- The Rough and the Smooth (1959)

=== Plays ===
- Between Us Two (1935)
- The Human Touch (1948)
- Let's Talk Turkey (1954)
- Beware of Angels (1959)

== Bibliography ==
- Wearing, J.P. The London Stage 1940-1949: A Calendar of Productions, Performers, and Personnel. Rowman & Littlefield, 2014.
