= Living Dangerously (1936 film) =

1936 film

- Theatrical release poster
- Directed by: Herbert Brenon
- Written by: Dudley Leslie; Marjorie Deans; Geoffrey Kerr
- Based on: play by Reginald Simpson; Frank Gregory
- Produced by: Walter C. Mycroft
- Starring: Otto Kruger; Leonora Corbett; Francis Lister
- Cinematography: Bryan Langley
- Edited by: Flora Newton
- Production company: British International Pictures
- Distributed by: Wardour Films
- Release date: 9 March 1936
- Running time: 72 minutes
- Country: United Kingdom
- Language: English

Living Dangerously is a 1936 British drama film directed by Herbert Brenon and starring Otto Kruger, Leonora Corbett and Francis Lister. It was written by Dudley Leslie, Marjorie Deans and Geoffrey Kerr based on the play by Reginald Simpson and Frank Gregory. It was made at Elstree Studios. The film's sets were designed by the art director Cedric Dawe.

== Plot ==
In New York City a successful doctor shoots dead a man who calls at his apartment one night, then explains to his friend the district attorney the reason: He and the dead man had run a medical practice in London which was broken up amidst charges of medical malpractice.

== Cast ==
- Otto Kruger as Dr. Stanley Norton
- Leonora Corbett as Helen Pryor
- Francis Lister as Dr. Henry Pryor
- Aileen Marson as Vera Kennedy
- Lawrence Anderson as Lloyd
- Eric Stanley as Sir George Parker
- Charles Mortimer as Inspector Webster
- Hubert Harben as President of Council
- Iris Hoey as Lady Annesley
- James Carew as Lingard
- Jimmy Godden as Member of Council
- Hartley Power as District Attorney
- Hilda Campbell-Russell as nurse

== Reception ==
The Monthly Film Bulletin wrote: "Although the film was made in this country the American atmosphere is skilfully achieved. The scenes during the General Medical Council's proceedings (whether or not authentic) are dramatically convincing. The direction of the film as a whole is good, the action neatly handled, and the interest well maintained. Otto Kruger makes an attractive and sympathetic hero and Francis Lister brings the right air of villainy to the part of the murdered man."

Kine Weekly wrote: "Well acted, staged with dignity, and decorated with in intelligent dialogue, the film combines good theatre with detractive general entertainment. ... The G.M.C. inquisition brings in entirely new and powerful form of dramatic court procedure to the screen, and it's by approaching the cast-iron triangle theme from an original angle that the melodrama is able to open up fresh avenues without injury to the inherent strength and popularity of its subject matter."

Writing for The Spectator in 1936, Graham Greene gave the film a good review describing it as "quite worth watching for at local cinemas". Claiming that the film is "not a very satisfying film", Greene was nevertheless impressed by the criticisms the film made against the legal system and he noted that although "we are used to America criticizing her institutions on the screen, it is unusual [in England] for a picture with some bite and bitterness to get past the censor."
