= Romney Brent =

Mexican actor, director and dramatist (1902–1975)

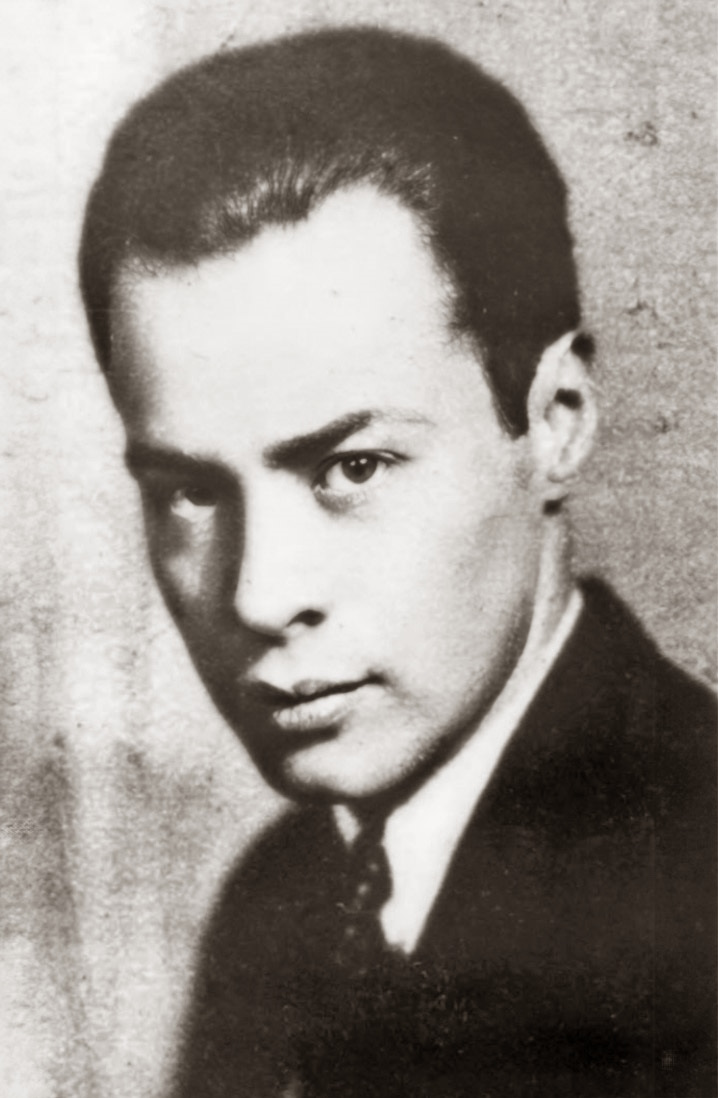
- Brent around 1929
- Born: Romulo Larralde; 26 January 1902; Saltillo, Coahuila, Mexico
- Died: 24 September 1976 (aged 74); Mexico City, Mexico
- Occupations: Actor; Director; Dramatist
- Years active: 1922–1965
- Spouse: Gina Malo (m. 1937; died 1963)
- Children: 1

Romney Brent (born Romulo Larralde; 26 January 1902 – 24 September 1976) was a Mexican actor, director and dramatist. Most of his career was on stage in North America, but in the 1930s he was frequently seen on the London stage, on television and in films.

== Early life ==
Born Romulo Larralde 26 January 1902 in Saltillo, Coahuila, Mexico, his father was a diplomat, and Brent was educated in several cities throughout the world, especially in New York City.

== Career ==
He studied for the stage under Theodore Komisarjevsky and began work as an actor with the Theatre Guild in He Who Gets Slapped when he was 20 and later that year was on Broadway in their production of The Lucky One by A. A. Milne. He established a reputation in "gentle, ingratiating" roles, such as the Lion in George Bernard Shaw's Androcles and the Lion, the worried groom in Shaw's Getting Married and Launcelot Gobbo in The Merchant of Venice. In 1925–26, he appeared in two seasons of the long-running musical revue Garrick Gaieties on Broadway. Another Broadway success was in The Little Show in 1929–30.

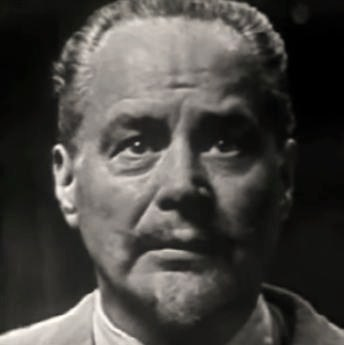
Brent in the TV series Suspense (1949)

In 1932, in London, he appeared in Noël Coward's revue Words and Music as compère, as Stanhope in a parody of Journey's End, and as a missionary in a sketch in which he sang Coward's famous song "Mad Dogs and Englishmen". While in London, he directed a Herbert Farjeon revue and wrote the book for Cole Porter's Nymph Errant. In 1933 Brent was cast as Paul, Duc de Chaucigny-Varennes in Coward's Conversation Piece but struggled with the role and was replaced by Coward himself, to whom Brent gladly handed it over, adding "providing you let me still come to rehearsals and watch you find out what a bloody awful part it is."

In New York in the 1930s, Brent created the role of the Rev Phosphor Hammingtrap in Shaw's The Simpleton of the Unexpected Isles, which he also directed. In London he played Tobias in James Bridie's Tobias and the Angel and Bottom in A Midsummer Night's Dream. After that, his main work in the theatre was in America, both in the classics and in modern works, as actor and director. For example, in 1946–47 he starred on Broadway in Joan of Lorraine. In Mexico he directed plays in Spanish.

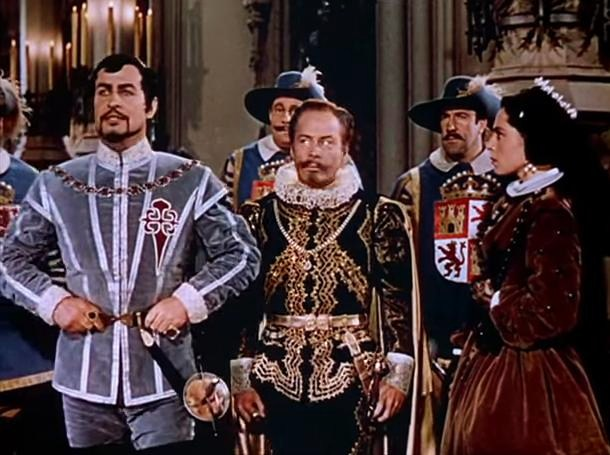
From Adventures of Don Juan (1948), L-R: Robert Douglas, Romney Brent & Viveca Lindfors

Brent appeared in numerous television shows from 1930 into the 1960s. Among other films, he appeared in East Meets West (1936), Under the Red Robe (1937), Dinner at the Ritz (1937), The Middle Watch (1940) and Adventures of Don Juan (1949).

He appeared as Autolycus in The Winter's Tale by William Shakespeare in 1945-46. That show, produced by the Theatre Guild, opened in Pittsburgh September 24, 1945 and toured fourteen American Cities before opening at the Cort Theater in New York City January 16, 1946. B. Iden Payne was listed as the director of the show when it opened; by the time the show arrived in New York City, Payne and Brent were both listed as directors. In 1946, Brent directed and appeared (as Caius) in another touring Shakespeare play produced by the Theatre Guild, The Merry Wives of Windsor. In September 1965, Brent went to Manila, the Philippines, to direct a stage production of the Broadway musical Carnival (for then St. Paul College, now St. Paul University, Manila) with the Manila Symphony Orchestra.

On television he appeared on Pulitzer Prize Playhouse, Somerset Maugham TV Theatre, Robert Montgomery Presents, Suspense, Schlitz Playhouse of Stars, Kraft Theatre, Playhouse 90, Zorro and The Adventures of Jim Bowie. He portrayed the French detective Maigret in an episode of Studio One, and Dr. Armstrong in a 1959 NBC TV film of Agatha Christie's Ten Little Indians.

== Personal life and death ==
During the last seven years of his life, he taught drama in Mexico City. Brent was married to the American actress and singer Gina Malo. He died at the age of 74 in Mexico City, Mexico.

== Filmography ==
Year	Title	Role	Notes
1936	East Meets West	Dr. Shagu	
1937	Head Over Heels	Matty	
1937	The Dominant Sex	Joe Clayton	
1937	Dreaming Lips	Peter Lawrence	
1937	Under the Red Robe	Marius	
1937	Who's Your Lady Friend?	Fred	
1937	School for Husbands	Morgan Cheswick	
1937	Dinner at the Ritz	Jimmy Raine	
1938	His Lordship Goes to Press	Pinkie Butler	
1939	On the Night of the Fire	Jimsey Jones	
1940	The Middle Watch	Ah Fong	
1940	Let George Do It!	Slim Selwyn	
1948	The Adventures of Don Juan	King Phillip III	
1950	Dream Ballerina	Director	
1955	The Virgin Queen	French Ambassador	
1957	Don't Go Near the Water	Mr. Alba - Melora's Father	
1958	Screaming Mimi	Charlie Weston	
