= Diana Churchill (actress) =

English actress (1913–1994)

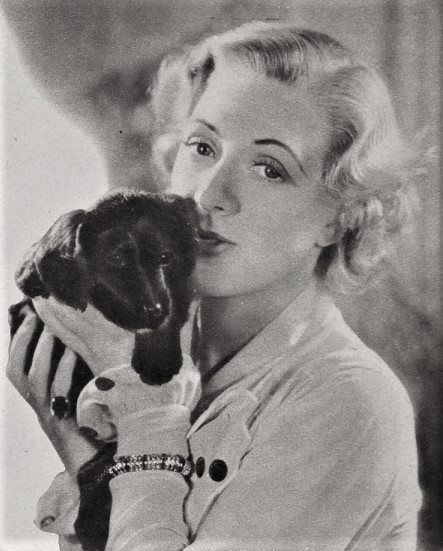
- Churchill in December 1936
- Born: 21 August 1913; Wembley, England
- Died: 8 October 1994 (aged 81); Denville Hall, London, England
- Education: St Mary's School, Wantage; Guildhall School of Music
- Occupation: Actress
- Years active: 1932–1977
- Spouses: Barry K. Barnes (m. 1938; died 1965) Mervyn Johns (m. 1976; died 1992)
- Relatives: John Campbell-Jones (nephew); Ralph W. Brinton (brother-in-law); Glynis Johns (step-daughter)

Diana Josephine Churchill (21 August 1913 – 8 October 1994) was an English actress. Churchill appeared in several British films, playing the sardonic heroine in a handful of comic chillers during the early 1930s. She was mainly a theatre actress into the war years and after, an actress for "all theatrical seasons" who was "renowned for her versatility in playing Shakespeare, Restoration comedy, farce, Chekhov and revue".

== Early life and education ==
Churchill was born on 21 August 1913 in Wembley, London, where her family resided in Crawford House. One of three sisters, she was the daughter of Ethel Mary Churchill (née Nunn) of the substantial Nunn coal merchant family, and Joseph Henry "Harry" Churchill MRCS LRCP, a doctor of medicine. She was a distant relation to Winston Churchill and his daughter, Diana, who was also an actress. Her father descended from a younger brother of John Churchill, 1st Duke of Marlborough, who "had an affair with an actress".

Churchill attended St Mary's School, an independent girls' boarding school in Wantage, and the Guildhall School of Music in London. On leaving school, she persuaded her father to let her train for the stage.

== Career ==
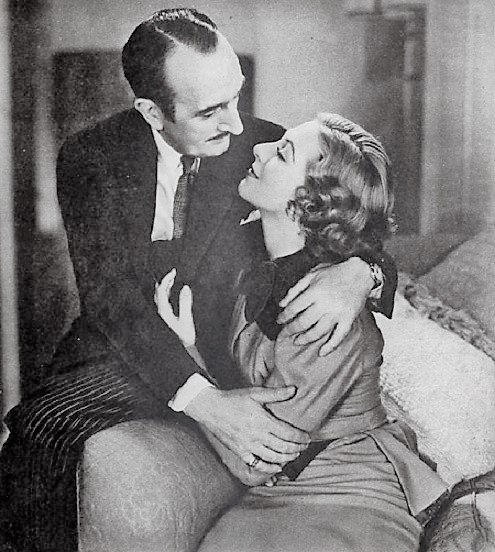
Churchill with Tom Walls in Dishonour Bright (1936)

In what was described as "an extraordinarily swift rise to fame", Churchill made her West End debut in 1931 at the age of 18. Following this, she played Dorothy Hardy in Whose Baby are You? and Lucy Fairweatiher in the burlesque adaptation of Dion Boucicault's melodrama The Streets of London, in 1932.

Churchill was never short of work; a point of common affection was the variety in her performances. Her big break came in 1935 with the British comedy film Foreign Affaires, directed by and starring Tom Walls. A stint at the Oxford Playhouse taught her "an authoritative command of the stage," which aided her part as the young wife in Michael Egan's The Dominant Sex (1937). Her success led to her starring in School for Husbands (1937) and Housemaster (1938). She was popular in the world of drama for being "level-headed and good-tempered". Only once did she come near to losing her poise: during difficult filming of Cover's Knot in 1938, on the seventh take she flubbed her lines. She apologized to the director, saying, "Sorry, ducky, but I think I’m going to get temperamental. I'll go for a walk." She was back within moments and ran the scene perfectly.

She was one of the first three stars to have their names up in lights in the West End when lighting restrictions were lifted at the end of the Second World War. Churchill performed in a production of Love's Labours Lost at The Old Vic opposite Michael Redgrave, with Hugh Hunt directing.

After early glory, Churchill endured a decade of mediocre comedies and revivals. She gained recognition following her appearance in the 1948 West End revue Oranges and Lemons and was found to have an able singing voice matching that of her co-star, Max Adrian. That same year, Churchill was cast in the starring role of Kathleen Scott in Charles Frend's adventure film Scott of the Antarctic with John Mills as Robert Falcon Scott, for which she was widely praised.

After spending years in "fluffy West End comedies and farces", Churchill began taking parts in more serious productions. Ever ambitious, she joined The Old Vic for the 1940–50 season: "her Rosaline was a lacklustre revival of Love's Labour's Lost, but her brisk Kate in She Stoops to Conquer pleased the critics." In 1953, she again entered revue when she was cast in High Spirits, proving "herself equally mistress of both an astringent bitchiness and of tender sentiment." She portrayed Emlyn Williams's docile wife in his thriller Accolade (1950) and the "ill-bred bossy" Natasha in Three Sisters (1951).

In the 1960s, Churchill's began to slow down, as she was occupied with caring for her first husband, Barry K. Barnes. She appeared in The Rehearsal (1961) at Shakespeare's Globe, The Winter's Tale in Cambridge in 1966, and Heartbreak House in Chichester.

== Personal life ==
Churchill married twice. In 1938, she married actor Barry K. Barnes, with whom she starred in the radio show A Life of Bliss. Barnes died on 12 January 1965, and she married actor Mervyn Johns, on 4 December 1976 in Hillingdon, London. He too predeceased her, dying on 6 September 1992.

Churchill was diagnosed with multiple sclerosis, though even this "could not dampen her spirits". With her health deteriorating, she moved to Denville Hall, Northwood in the mid-1970s. Diana Churchill died at the age of 81 in Denville Hall in Northwood, London on 8 October 1994. She was cremated at Breakspear Crematorium in Ruislip, London.

Churchill was an aunt of racing driver John Campbell-Jones and a sister-in-law of art director Ralph W. Brinton.

== Filmography ==
- Service for Ladies (1932)
- Sally Bishop (1932)
- Foreign Affaires (1935)
- Sensation (1936)
- Pot Luck (1936)
- Dishonour Bright (1936)
- The Dominant Sex (1937)
- School for Husbands (1937)
- Jane Steps Out (1938)
- Housemaster (1938)
- Yes, Madam? (1939)
- The Spider (1940)
- Law and Disorder (1940)
- The House of the Arrow (1940)
- Scott of the Antarctic (1948)
- The History of Mr. Polly (1949)
- The Winter's Tale (1967)
- The New Avengers, 1 episode (1977)

== Selected stage credits ==
- Someone at the Door by Dorothy Christie (1935)
- The Composite Man by Ronald Jeans (1936)
- Tony Draws a Horse by Lesley Storm (1939)
- As You Are by Hugh Mills (1940)
- Accolade by Emlyn Williams (1950)

== Radio ==
- A Life of Bliss (1953 onwards), as Ann Fellows (starring Colin Gordon and George Cole).
