= The Secret of Madame Blanche =

1933 film by Charles Brabin

- Theatrical release poster
- Directed by: Charles Brabin
- Screenplay by: Frances Goodrich; Albert Hackett
- Based on: The Lady; 1923 play by Martin Brown
- Starring: Irene Dunne; Lionel Atwill; Phillips Holmes; Una Merkel; Douglas Walton
- Cinematography: Merritt B. Gerstad
- Edited by: Blanche Sewell
- Music by: William Axt
- Production company: Metro-Goldwyn-Mayer
- Distributed by: Metro-Goldwyn-Mayer
- Release date: February 3, 1933
- Running time: 84 minutes
- Country: United States
- Language: English

The Secret of Madame Blanche is a 1933 American pre-Code drama film directed by Charles Brabin and written by Frances Goodrich and Albert Hackett. The film stars Irene Dunne, Lionel Atwill, Phillips Holmes, Una Merkel and Douglas Walton. The film was released on February 3, 1933, by Metro-Goldwyn-Mayer.

== Plot ==
Sally Sanders is an American showgirl visiting London in 1898 when she marries Leonard St. John, much to the displeasure of his wealthy and snobbish father, Aubrey St. Johns, who cuts off his son. The couple moves to France. When Leonard is unable to provide a living for his new bride and himself, he eventually goes home to his father asking for help. St. Johns suggests that his son divorce his wife and keep her as a mistress, while marrying within his own class. He agrees to take his son back but only if he writes to Sally ending the marriage. Leonard, seeing no alternative, agrees. However, instead Leonard provides him with a suicide note and shoots himself.

When St. Johns discovers that Sally was carrying his grandson, he has her followed by a private detective in hopes of seizing custody of his only heir. When Sally, saving to return to America, is reduced to singing in a French bordello, St. Johns swiftly obtains a court order and seizes the infant while Sally is at work. After being assured of her legal defeat, Sally goes to St. Johns pleading for the return of her son on any terms, and is rudely rebuffed, banned from all contact with the family, and threatened with prison if she persists. The child is to be raised with no contact with or knowledge of his mother.

During World War I, Leonard Junior, now grown and in uniform as a British serviceman, visits the bordello with a date, hoping to obtain a room, which isn't available, and meets Sally, with neither aware of the other's identity. When he becomes drunk and disorderly he is knocked unconscious and Sally takes care of him, learning his identity from his date, whom she sends home with carfare. When Leonard awakens, the two become acquainted and then friendly, and Sally learns that her son was raised to despise women, including his mother, about whom he has heard only lies, including that she is dead. At this moment the enraged father of Leonard's abandoned date arrives and forces his way into the closed establishment, intending to kill Leonard. In the ensuing struggle Leonard kills the man with Sally's gun. She sends him away and confesses to the killing, without revealing her motive for helping him.

St. John encourages his grandson to go along with the lie, expecting blackmail, but at Sally's trial, as she pleads self-defense, he secretly recognizes her. The prosecutor then surprises everyone by debunking Sally's confession and revealing Sally's identity and motive for protecting Leonard. Mother and son are joyfully reunited as Leonard confesses to being the real shooter and angrily renounces his grandfather.

Leonard is sentenced to two years in jail for the shooting, and when Sally visits, the two plan their long-delayed trip to America as mother and son.

== Cast ==
- Irene Dunne as Sally
- Lionel Atwill as Aubrey St. John
- Phillips Holmes as Leonard St. John
- Una Merkel as Ella
- Douglas Walton as Leonard Junior
- C. Henry Gordon as State's Attorney
- Jean Parker as Eloise
- Eileen Percy as Maizie
- Mitchell Lewis as Duval
- Jameson Thomas as Jones - a Private Detective
- Jed Prouty as Stubby - the Troupe Manager
- Adrienne D'Ambricourt as Marie - the French Nurse
- Paul Porcasi as French Doctor
- Albert Conti as French Hotel Desk Clerk
- Rose Dione as Cafe Proprietress
- Lawrence Grant as Commanding Officer
- Lillian Harmer as Aubrey's Maid
- Ivan F. Simpson as Aubrey's Lawyer
