= Billy Milton =

British actor (1905–1989)

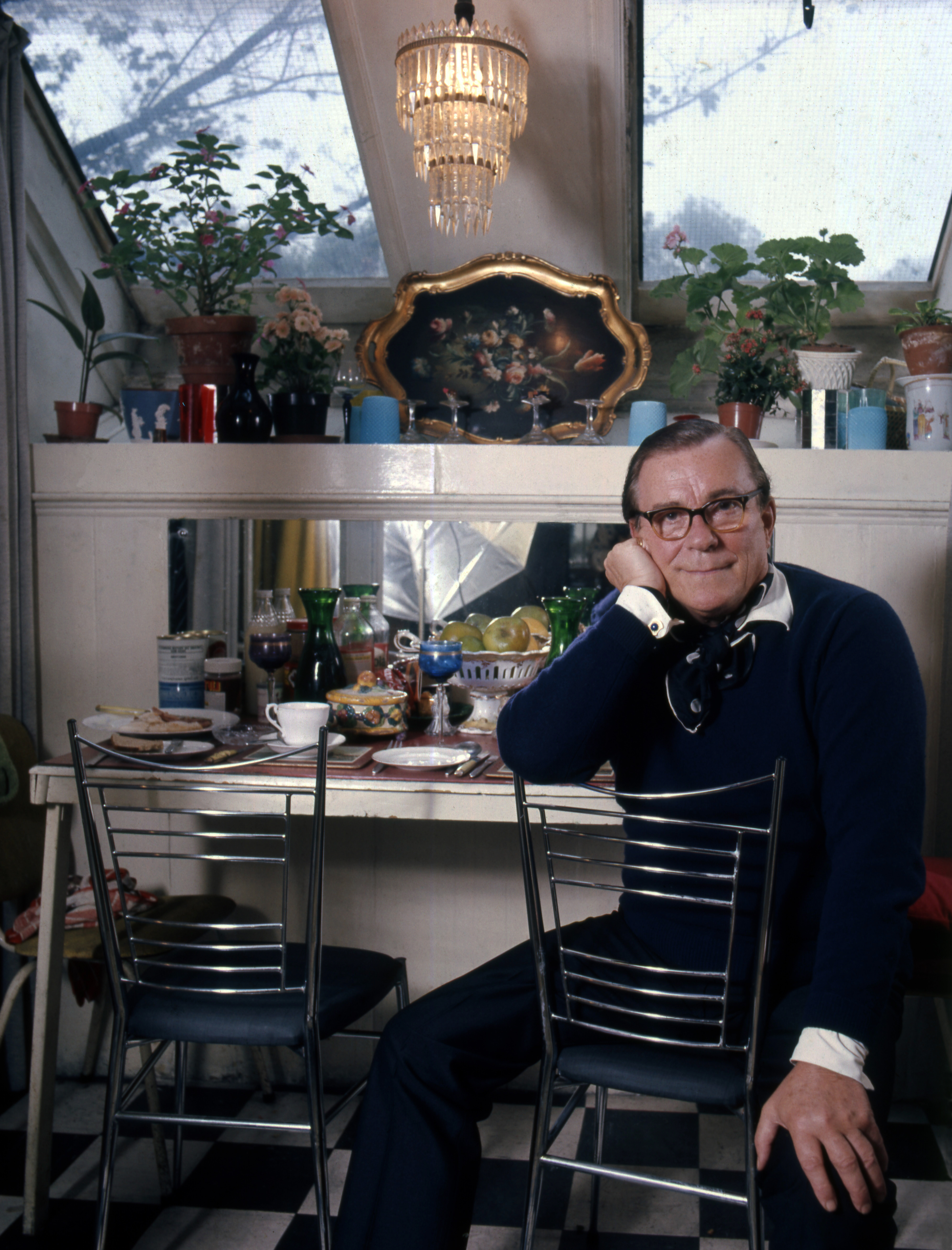
- Portrait by Allan Warren, 1973
- Born: William Thomas Milton; 8 December 1905; Paddington, Middlesex
- Died: 22 November 1989 (aged 83); London, England
- Occupation: Actor

Billy Milton (8 December 1905 – 22 November 1989) was a British stage, film, and television actor. Born in Paddington, Middlesex (now in London), as William Thomas Milton, he was the son of Harry Harman Milton (1880–1942), a commission agent, and his wife Hilda Eugenie Milton (née Jackson; 1878–1935).

== Partial filmography ==
- The Flag Lieutenant (1927) − (uncredited)
- Young Woodley (1931) − Vining
- The Man from Chicago (1931) − Barry Larwood
- The Great Gay Road (1931) − Rodney
- The Dressmaker of Luneville (1932)
- Three Men in a Boat (1933) − Jimmy
- Aunt Sally (1933) − Billy
- Music Hath Charms (1935) − Jack Lawton
- King of the Castle (1936) − Monty King
- Once in a Million (1936) − Prince
- Someone at the Door (1936) − Ronnie Martin
- A Star Fell from Heaven (1936) − Douglas Lincoln
- No Escape (1936) − Billy West
- Aren't Men Beasts! (1937) − Roger Holly
- The Dominant Sex (1937) − Alec Winstone
- Spring Handicap (1937) − Len Redpath
- Saturday Night Revue (1937) − Jimmy Hanson
- The Last Chance (1937) − Michael Worrall
- Oh Boy! (1938) − Conductor
- Yes, Madam? (1939) − Tony Tolliver
- The Key Man (1957) − French Waiter
- Playback (1962) − Second Drunk
- The Small World of Sammy Lee (1963) − Store Manager
- Heavens Above! (1963) − Fellowes (uncredited)
- The Set Up (1963) − Simpson
- Who Was Maddox? (1964) − Chandler
- Devils of Darkness (1965) − Librarian
- Monster of Terror (1965) − Henry
- Licensed to Kill (1965) − Wilson
- Mrs. Brown, You've Got a Lovely Daughter (1968) − Landlord
- Hot Millions (1968) − Agent (uncredited)
- Sweet William (1980) − Old Actor in play
