= Cecil Parker =

English actor (1897–1971)

- Born: Cecil Schwabe; 3 September 1897; Hastings, Sussex, England
- Died: 20 April 1971 (aged 73); Brighton, Sussex, England
- Occupation: Actor
- Years active: 1928–1969
- Spouse: Muriel Anne Randall Brown (m. 1927)
- Children: 1

Cecil Parker (born Cecil Schwabe; 3 September 1897 – 20 April 1971) was an English actor with a distinctively husky voice, who usually played supporting roles, often characters with a supercilious demeanour, in his 91 films made between 1928 and 1969.

== Early life ==
Parker was born in Hastings, Sussex, the second son (and fifth of six children) of German-born Charles August Schwabe, manager of the Albany Hotel, Hastings, and his English wife, Kate (née Parker), a church organist. He was baptised into the Church of England at Holy Trinity Church, Hastings, on 7 November 1899, and educated at St Francis Xavier's College and at Bruges in Belgium.

== Career ==
As Cecil Schwabe, he served with the Royal Sussex Regiment in the First World War, reaching the rank of sergeant. He began his theatrical career in London in 1922, adopting the surname "Parker" from his mother's maiden name. He made his first film appearance in 1933 and subsequently became a familiar face in British and occasionally American films until his death. He appeared less often on television, but many of his films have remained popular and are often shown.

He acted in two adaptations of A. J. Cronin's novels, The Citadel (1938) and The Stars Look Down (1940), in addition to appearing in The Lady Vanishes (1938) and Under Capricorn (1949). Both of these latter films were directed by Alfred Hitchcock. Other roles were in Storm in a Teacup (1937), The Weaker Sex (1948), 23 Paces to Baker Street (1956), Dangerous Moonlight (1941), Swiss Family Robinson (1960), and I Was Monty's Double (1958), as well as the comedies A French Mistress (1960), The Ladykillers (1955), The Man in the White Suit (1951), The Court Jester (1955) (in which he played an evil, usurping king of England), Indiscreet (1958) and I Believe in You (1952). Parker was also the original Charles Condomine in the West End production of Noël Coward's Blithe Spirit.

He often played a touchy senior officer or British upper class character, and his last two films were true to form: The Magnificent Two (1967) with the British comedy double act Morecambe and Wise and Richard Attenborough's version of Oh! What a Lovely War (1969).

On November 20, 1950, he co-starred with Margaret O'Brien in "The Canterville Ghost", on Robert Montgomery Presents on TV. He played a butler on one episode of The Avengers ("The £50,000 Breakfast"). In 1957 he played Dr. Morelle in BBC radio series, "A Case for Dr. Morelle" (13 episodes).

== Personal life ==
Parker was married to Muriel Anne Randell-Brown (born in Seacombe, Cheshire), from September 1927 until his death in 1971, in Brighton.

== Filmography ==
- The Golden Cage (1933)
- A Cuckoo in the Nest (1933) as Claude Hickett
- The Silver Spoon (1934) as Trevor
- Flat No. 3 (1934) as Hilary Maine
- Nine Forty-Five (1934) as Robert Clayton
- Princess Charming (1934) as Mr. Thompson (uncredited)
- The Blue Squadron (1934) as Bianci
- Little Friend (1934) as Mason
- Lady in Danger (1934) as Piker
- Dirty Work (1934) as Gordon Bray
- Me and Marlborough (1935) as Colonel of the Greys
- Crime Unlimited (1935) as Assistant Commissioner
- The Guv'nor (1935) as Bank Director (uncredited)
- Her Last Affaire (1935) as Sir Arthur Harding
- Foreign Affaires (1935) as Lord Wormington
- Men of Yesterday (1936)
- The Man Who Changed His Mind (1936) as Dr. Gratton
- Dishonour Bright (1936) as Vincent Crane
- Jack of All Trades (1936) as Sir Charles Darrington
- Dark Journey (1937) as Captain of Q-Boat
- Storm in a Teacup (1937) as Provost William Gow
- Housemaster (1938) as Sir Berkeley Nightingale
- The Lady Vanishes (1938) as Mr. Todhunter
- The Citadel (1938) as Charles Every
- Old Iron (1938) as Barnett
- Sons of the Sea (1939) as Commander Herbert
- She Couldn't Say No (1939) as Jimmy Reeves
- The Stars Look Down (1940) as Stanley Millington
- The Spider (1940) as Lawrence Bruce
- Under Your Hat (1940) as Sir Jeffrey Arlington
- Two for Danger (1940) as Sir Richard
- The Saint's Vacation (1941) as Rudolph
- Dangerous Moonlight (1941) as Specialist
- Ships with Wings (1942) as German Air Marshal
- Caesar and Cleopatra (1945) as Britannus
- The Magic Bow (1946) as Luigi Germi
- Hungry Hill (1947) as Copper John
- Captain Boycott (1947) as Captain Charles C. Boycott
- The Woman in the Hall (1947) as Sir Halmar Barnard
- The First Gentleman (1948) as The Prince Regent
- The Weaker Sex (1948) as Geoffrey Radcliffe
- Quartet (1948) as Colonel Peregrine (segment "The Colonel's Lady")
- Dear Mr. Prohack (1949) as Arthur Prohack
- Under Capricorn (1949) as The Governor
- The Chiltern Hundreds (1949) as Benjamin Beecham
- Tony Draws a Horse (1950) as Dr. Howard Fleming
- The Man in the White Suit (1951) as Alan Birnley
- The Magic Box (1951) as First Platform Man
- His Excellency (1951) as Sir James Kirkman
- I Believe in You (1952) as Phipps
- Father Brown (1954) as The Bishop
- For Better, for Worse (1954) as Anne's Father
- Isn't Life Wonderful! (1954) as Father
- The Constant Husband (1955) as The Professor
- The Ladykillers (1955) as Claude Courtney
- The Court Jester (1955) as King Roderick I
- 23 Paces to Baker Street (1956) as Bob Matthews
- It's Great to Be Young (1956) as Mr. Frome, Headmaster
- True as a Turtle (1957) as Dudley Partridge
- The Admirable Crichton (1957) as Lord Loam
- A Tale of Two Cities (1958) as Jarvis Lorry
- Happy Is the Bride (1958) as Arthur Royd
- Indiscreet (1958) as Alfred Munson
- I Was Monty's Double (1958) as Colonel Logan
- The Navy Lark (1959) as Commander Stanton
- The Night We Dropped a Clanger (1959) as Air Vice-Marshal Sir Bertram Bukpasser
- The Wreck of the Mary Deare (1959) as The Chairman
- Sotto dieci bandiere (1960) as Colonel Howard
- Follow That Horse! (1960) as Sir William Crane
- A French Mistress (1960) as John Crane M.A., Headmaster of Melbury School
- Swiss Family Robinson (1960) as Captain Moreland
- The Pure Hell of St Trinian's (1960) as Professor Canford
- Alfred Hitchcock Presents (1961) (Season 7 Episode 9: "I Spy") as Lawyer
- On the Fiddle (1961) as Gr / Captain Bascombe
- Petticoat Pirates (1961) as C-in-C
- The Brain (1962) as Stevenson
- The Iron Maiden (1962) as Sir Giles Thompson
- The Amorous Prawn (1962) as General Sir Hamish Fitzadam
- Heavens Above! (1963) as Archdeacon Aspinall
- Carry On Jack (1963) as First Sealord
- Guns at Batasi (1964) as Fletcher
- The Comedy Man (1964) as Thomas Rutherford
- The Amorous Adventures of Moll Flanders (1965) as The Mayor
- A Study in Terror (1965) as Prime Minister
- Lady L (1965) as Sir Percy
- A Man Could Get Killed (1966) as Sir Huntley Frazier
- Circus of Fear (1966) as Sir John
- The Magnificent Two (1967) as Sir John / British Ambassador
- The Avengers (1967) (TV Series) (Season 6 Episode 3: "The £50,000 Breakfast") as Glover
- Oh! What a Lovely War (1969) as Sir John (final film role)
