= Tony Draws a Horse (play) =

1938 play

- Original language: English
- Written by: Lesley Storm
- Genre: Comedy

Premiere
- Date: 31 March 1938
- Place: Liverpool Playhouse, Liverpool

Tony Draws a Horse is a comedy play by the British writer Lesley Storm. It was later adapted into a 1950 film of the same title.

It premiered at the Liverpool Playhouse before transferring to the West End where it ran for 363 performances between 26 January 1939 and 6 January 1940, initially at the Criterion Theatre before moving to the Strand Theatre and then the Comedy Theatre. Actors who appeared in the London version included Nigel Patrick, Cyril Raymond, Stewart Granger, James Harcourt, John Turnbull, Anthony Holles and Diana Churchill. It also ran for 13 performances as Billy Draws a Horse at the Playhouse Theatre on Broadway.

== Bibliography ==
- Wearing, J.P. The London Stage 1930-1939: A Calendar of Productions, Performers, and Personnel. Rowman & Littlefield, 2014.
