= Foreign Affaires =

1935 film

- Opening titles
- Directed by: Tom Walls
- Written by: Ben Travers
- Produced by: Michael Balcon
- Starring: Tom Walls; Ralph Lynn; Robertson Hare; Norma Varden
- Cinematography: Roy Kellino
- Edited by: Alfred Roome
- Music by: Jack Beaver
- Production company: Gainsborough Pictures
- Distributed by: Gaumont British
- Release date: 1935
- Running time: 71 minutes
- Country: United Kingdom
- Language: English

Foreign Affaires (also known as Foreign Affairs and Foreign Affairs 35) is a 1935 British comedy film directed by and starring Tom Walls, and featuring Ralph Lynn, Robertson Hare, Norma Varden and Cecil Parker. The screenplay was by Ben Travers, and the cast includes actors from the Walls and Travers Aldwych Farces.

== Plot ==
The film is set on the French Riviera where two hard-living British spongers become mixed up in illegal gambling and a scam in which wealthy gamblers' jewels are replaced with fakes.

== Cast ==
- Tom Walls as Captain Archibald Gore
- Ralph Lynn as Jefferson Darby
- Robertson Hare as Mr Hardy Hornett
- Norma Varden as Mrs Hardy Hornett
- Marie Lohr as Mrs Cope
- Diana Churchill as Sophie
- Cecil Parker as Lord Wormington
- Kathleen Kelly as Millicent
- Gordon James as Rope
- Ivor Barnard as Count
- Mervyn Johns as courtroom interpreter
- Basil Radford as Basil Mallory
- Martita Hunt as woman at Lord Wormington's house

== Production ==
Ben Travers wrote various stage farces that had been filmed, but this was an original script. Filming took place in August 1935.

Travers said the original title of the screenplay was Foreign Affairs and "it was typical of British film mentality that, without my being consulted, it was renamed Foreign Affaires. The movie provided aan early film role for Mervyn Johns who Travers said "so completely stole his one scene with Tom and Ralph that his part was almost completely cut out of the finally-edited version. But I am always pleased to have given Mervyn his first job in the pictures."

== Reception ==
The Monthly Film Bulletin wrote: "The plot has interest, the dialogue is amusing, the settings are spaciously effective and the picture as a whole has considerable entertainment value; but it is not wall-constructed or edited and Tom Walls gives more time to the old reprobate's pomposity than its humour justifies. The acting is good and the photography is of a nice quality though the slow fade out is hardly suitable for a picture which needs all the pace it can get."

The Daily Film Renter wrote: "It is, frankly, pretty thin stuff, but the antics of the comedians keep things going at a fairly consistent rate, while Robertson Hare is on hand in his well-known hen-pecked husband study. Walls invests his portrayal with some deft touches, admirably suggesting the dandified captain; Lynn is content to be his fatuous screen self, a state of affairs with which few of his admirers will find fault, and Hare again epitomises all the ill-used husbands in creation. Kathleen Kelly and Diana Churchill cater for the romance in decorative fashion."

Variety called it "an agreeable vehicle for the buffooneries of Tom Walls and Ralph Lynn, which hitherto have been more acceptable for local taste than further afield. In this instance the appeal should be more extensive. There is a refreshing toning-down, less of Walls’ leerful eye and Lynn’s crass idiocy. Whole thing is more natural, and the ensuing events are feasible for a change without undue strain on credulity."
