= Pointed Heels =

1929 film by A. Edward Sutherland

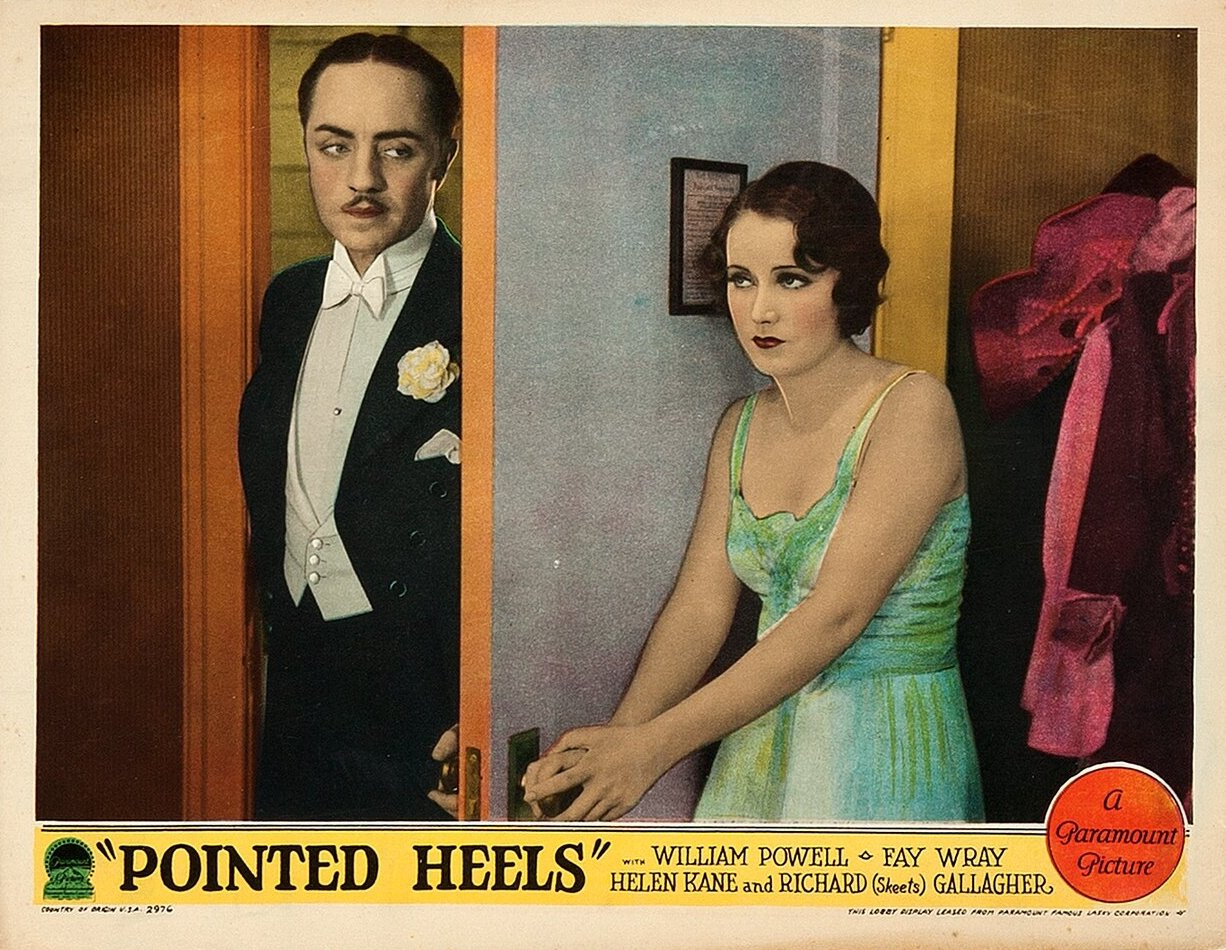
- Lobby card
- Directed by: A. Edward Sutherland
- Written by: Florence Ryerson; John V.A. Weaver
- Story by: Charles Brackett
- Starring: William Powell; Helen Kane; Fay Wray; Richard "Skeets" Gallagher
- Cinematography: Allen G. Siegler; Rex Wimpy (uncredited)
- Edited by: Jane Loring (uncredited)
- Production company: Paramount Pictures
- Distributed by: Paramount Pictures
- Release date: December 27, 1929
- Running time: 61 minutes
- Country: United States
- Language: English

Pointed Heels is a 1929 American pre-Code musical comedy film from Paramount Pictures that was directed by A. Edward Sutherland and starring William Powell, Helen Kane, Richard "Skeets" Gallagher, and Fay Wray.

The film was originally filmed with color sequences by Technicolor. One of these color sequences was the "Pointed Heels" ballet with Albertina Rasch and her Dancers. The UCLA Film & Television Archive has a complete copy of this film, including the color sequences. Turner Classic Movies airs the black-and-white television copy of this film. A print screened at the Hammer Museum in Los Angeles in 2009 contained the color ballet sequence. The film entered the public domain on January 1, 2025.

== Plot ==
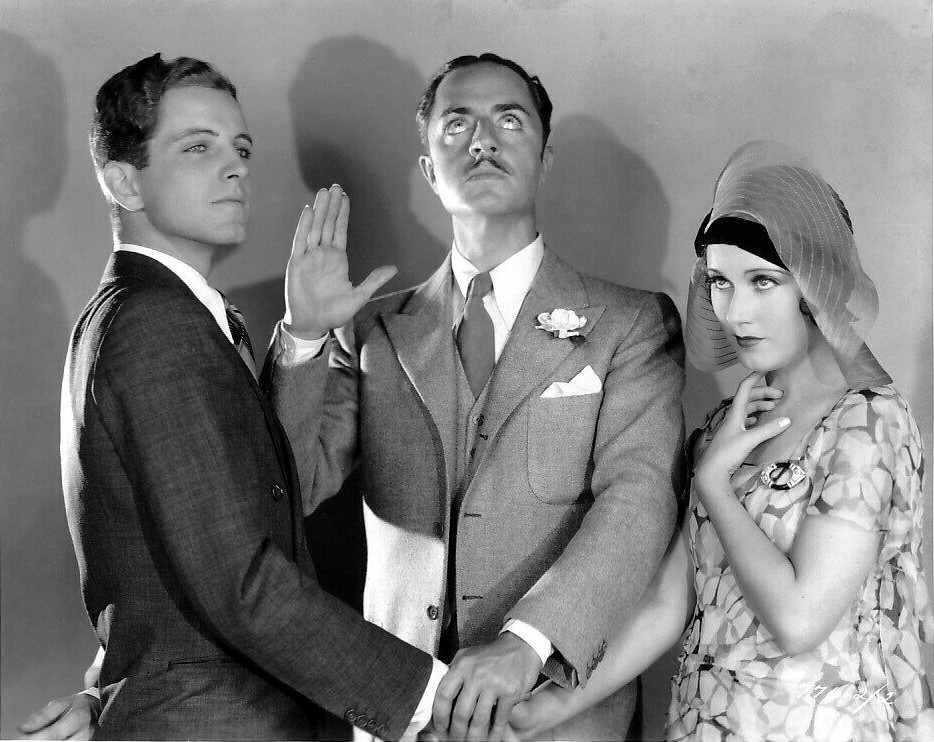
Phillips Holmes, William Powell and Fay Wray in Pointed Heels (1929)

Pointed Heels (1929)

As described in a film magazine, Robert Courtland is a millionaire addicted to theatrical productions. He falls for minor player Lora Nixon, but she announces her engagement to Donald Ogden, another, younger millionaire and quits the show. The mother of the younger millionaire cancels his allowance when informed of the marriage, so Lora returns to the stage to support him while he composes a jazz symphony.

Dash Nixon, the brother of Lora, is married to the tittering, argumentative Dot. They want to appear in their own show, and are backed by Robert because Lora will be in it. Dot and Dash decide to throw away their old low-comedy style and assume class. To save the show and prevent it from flopping because of this change, Robert gets the team drunk on opening night, and they do a wow hoke routine which puts the show over as a hit.

Young millionaire Donald meanwhile has separated from his wife because people had talked about how she was supporting him, and because it appeared that Robert was having an affair with her. Included in the show is a light jazz number he knocked out in an odd moment, and it becomes a hit. Reconciliations between Lora and her husband Donald follow, and with Robert quietly retiring, saying that the experience was valuable to him in proving that there is such a thing as love.

== Cast ==
- William Powell as Robert Courtland
- Helen Kane as Dorothea 'Dot' Nixon
- Fay Wray as Lora Nixon
- Richard "Skeets" Gallagher as Dash Nixon
- Phillips Holmes as Donald Ogden
- Eugene Pallette as Joe Carrington
- Adrienne Dore as Kay Wilcox
- Albertina Rasch Dancers as Themselves (uncredited)
- Virginia Bruce as Chorus Girl (uncredited)

== Production ==
The film was based on a short story by Charles Brackett. According to David Lewis, "It was beautifully written, but very thin in its development," so Lewis adapted it into a longer form which Paramount bought for $15,000.

A silent version of the film was released in the United States.

== See also ==
- List of early color feature films
- List of early sound feature films (1926–1929)

== Notes ==
- Lewis, David (1993). Curtis, James (ed.). The Creative Producer. Metuchen: Scarecrow Press. ISBN 0-8108-2720-4.
