= The Student's Romance =

1935 film

- Directed by: Otto Kanturek
- Written by: Fritz Löhner-Beda (operetta); Bruno Hardt-Warden (operetta); Clifford Grey; Richard Hutter; Norman Watson; Harry S. Pepper (lyrics); Ernst Neubach (lyrics)
- Produced by: Walter C. Mycroft
- Starring: Grete Natzler; Patric Knowles; Carol Goodner
- Cinematography: Bryan Langley
- Edited by: Walter Stokvis; Otto Kanturek
- Music by: Hans May
- Production company: British International Pictures
- Distributed by: Wardour Films
- Release date: 19 July 1935
- Running time: 70 minutes
- Country: United Kingdom
- Language: English

The Student's Romance (also known as Old Heidelberg, Heidelberg and I Lost My Heart in Heidelberg) is a 1935 British musical film directed by Otto Kanturek and starring Grete Natzler, Patric Knowles and Carol Goodner. It was written by Clifford Grey, Richard Hutter and Norman Watson based on the 1927 operetta I Lost My Heart in Heidelberg by Bruno Hardt-Warden and Fritz Löhner-Beda. It was made by British International Pictures at Elstree Studios. The film's sets were designed by the art directors Cedric Dawe and Clarence Elder.

== Plot ==
In 1825 Heidelberg, Max Brandt and Kail Reuter are two university students lodging at the Black Whale Inn. When Max is threatened with prison for his debts, the inn's proprietress Veronica Laubenthaler, out of the goodness of her heart, pays his debts. Her action leads to unfounded gossip which threatens Max's planned marriage to Princess Helene of Westphalia.

== Cast ==
- Grete Natzler as Princess Helene
- Patric Knowles as Max Brandt
- W.H. Berry as Pedell
- Carol Goodner as Veronika Laubenthaler
- Mackenzie Ward as Karl Reuter
- Iris Ashley as Desiree
- Steven Geray as Mickey
- Hugh Dempster as Bruno
- Ivan Samson as Grand Duke of Westphalia
- Robert Nainby as Hermann Streudelmeier, Karl's uncle
- Norma Varden as Dora Streudelmeier, Karl's aunt
- Wallace Lupino as sportsman
- Clay Keyes as Hans, policeman (as Haver and Lee)
- Frank Tully as Otto, policeman (as Haver and Lee)
- Gilbert Davis as bit part
- Jimmy Godden as bit part
- Maidie Hope as bit part

== Reception ==
The Monthly Film Bulletin wrote: "The direction is clumsy and full of stage tricks. The sets belong rather to the theatre. The dialogue is naive and lacks sparkle. A great deal of the acting, too, belongs to the other medium. It is perhaps unfair to blame the players, but only Mackenzie Ward, Carol Goodner and W. H. Berry manage to put any life into their parts."

Kine Weekly wrote: "Here we have a charming light confection, something to appeal to the ear and the eye. The story is of little account, and comedy is artless, but the evergreen romantic sentiment, wrapped in tuneful song and delivered against picturesque period backgrounds, nevertheless covers the smooth development with light entertainment of disarming daintiness and elegance. It is clean, refreshing and melodious."

The Daily Film Renter wrote: "Subject is staged against picturesque backgrounds of Heidelberg, with beer gardens and atmosphere of light-hearted gaiety. Grete Natzler and Patric Knowles render tuneful song numbers, Mackenzie Ward, W. H. Berry, Haver and Lee catering for comedy angles. Interior settings are impressive, attractive rural shots adding to general effect. Pleasant popular entertainment."
