= Torn Sails =

1920 film

- Directed by: A. V. Bramble
- Written by: Allen Raine (novel); Eliot Stannard
- Starring: Milton Rosmer; Mary Odette; Geoffrey Kerr; Jose Shannon
- Production company: Ideal Film Company
- Distributed by: Ideal Film Company
- Release date: 1920
- Country: United Kingdom
- Language: English

Torn Sails is a 1920 British silent drama film directed by A. V. Bramble and starring Milton Rosmer, Mary Odette and Geoffrey Kerr. It was based on the 1897 novel Torn Sails by Allen Raine. Like much of her work, it is set in a small Welsh village.

== Cast ==
- Milton Rosmer as Hugh Morgan
- Mary Odette as Gwladys Price
- Geoffrey Kerr as Ivor Parry
- Jose Shannon as Maud Owen
- Leo Gordon as Josh Howells
- Beatrix Templeton as Mrs. Price
