= Dinner at the Ritz =

1937 British film by Harold D. Schuster

- Directed by: Harold D. Schuster
- Written by: Roland Pertwee; Romney Brent
- Produced by: Robert Kane
- Starring: Annabella; David Niven; Paul Lukas; Romney Brent
- Cinematography: Philip Tannura
- Edited by: James B. Clark
- Music by: Muir Mathieson; Lee Sims
- Production company: New World Pictures
- Distributed by: 20th Century Fox
- Release dates: 21 October 1937 (UK); 26 November 1937 (US)
- Running time: 77 minutes
- Country: United Kingdom
- Language: English

Dinner at the Ritz is a 1937 British mystery romance film directed by Harold D. Schuster and starring David Niven, Annabella, and Paul Lukas. It was written by Roland Pertwee and Romney Brent, produced by the British branch of 20th Century Fox, and shot at Denham Studios.

== Synopsis ==
The daughter of a banker is engaged to marry one of her father's colleagues. However, her father inadvertently discovers his soon-to-be son-in-law is in fact one of the men who have misappropriated his bank's funds. While confronting Baron de Beaufort, Mr. Racine is shot; his daughter refuses to believe that his death was a suicide. Traveling in disguise and helped by a fraud investigator, she tracks those among his colleagues who looted his bank.

== Cast ==
- Annabella as Ranie Racine
- David Niven as Paul de Brack
- Paul Lukas as Baron Philip de Beaufort
- Romney Brent as Jimmy Raine
- Francis L. Sullivan as Brogard
- Stewart Rome as Racine
- Frederick Leister as Tarade
- William Dewhurst as Devine
- Tyrell Davis as Duval
- Vivienne Chatterton as Marthe
- Ronald Shiner as Sydney
- Nora Swinburne as Lady Railton
- Raymond Huntley as Gibout
- Ralph Truman as auctioneer
- O. B. Clarence as messenger (uncredited)
- Frederick Culley as (uncredited)
- Patricia Medina as (uncredited)
- Bill Shine in minor role (uncredited)
