= Tony Draws a Horse =

- Original theatrical poster
- Directed by: John Paddy Carstairs
- Written by: Brock Williams
- Based on: the play Tony Draws a Horse by Lesley Storm
- Produced by: Brock Williams
- Starring: Cecil Parker; Anne Crawford; Derek Bond; Barbara Murray
- Cinematography: Jack Hildyard
- Edited by: Gerald Thomas
- Music by: Bretton Byrd
- Production company: Pinnacle Productions
- Distributed by: General Film Distributors (UK)
- Release date: June 1950; (UK)
- Running time: 91 minutes
- Country: United Kingdom
- Language: English
- Budget: £93,400
- Box office: £80,000

Tony Draws a Horse is a 1950 British comedy film directed by John Paddy Carstairs and starring Cecil Parker, Anne Crawford and Derek Bond. It was adapted from a 1939 play of the same name by Lesley Storm.

== Plot ==
When their eight-year-old son Tony (Anthony Lang) draws a horse on his father's office wall, complete with reproductive organs, surgeon father (Cecil Parker) and psychiatrist mother (Anne Crawford) come to blows over how to deal with the boy's behaviour. The father favours discipline and a beating for the child, the mother wants to spare the rod and reward Tony for so freely expressing himself. The resulting marital bust up causes the wife to leave for her parents home, and from thence to Dieppe.

== Cast ==
- Cecil Parker as Dr. Howard Fleming
- Anne Crawford as Clare Fleming
- Derek Bond as Tim Shields
- Barbara Murray as Joan Parsons
- Mervyn Johns as Alfred Parsons
- Barbara Everest as Mrs. Parsons
- Edward Rigby as Grandpa
- Dandy Nichols as Mrs. Smith
- Gabrielle Blunt as Grace
- Marjorie Gresley as Mrs. Carey Brown
- David Hurst as Ivan
- Anthony Lang as Tony Fleming
- Kynaston Reeves as Dr. Bletchley

== Critical reception ==
In The New York Times, Bosley Crowther wrote, "To spank or not to spank, that is the question which gayly precipitates a clash of parental personalities and a consequent explosion of domestic strife in the Park Avenue Theatre's new attraction, the British comedy, 'Tony Draws a Horse'....It is out of this cozy situation that Mr. Williams (from Mr. Storm) has propelled a tempest of family complications that rocks with hilarity...it is a toss-up as to which is more fun—Cecil Parker as the pompous father or Anne Crawford as the mother with new ideas. Mr. Parker does a richly amusing characterization of a righteous fuddy-dud and Miss Crawford is blithe and beguiling as a lady who is a little light in the head. Barbara Everest fumes and fusses like a school-marm as the matron who worships routine, Mervyn Johns is gentle as her husband and Edward Rigby is a card as grandpa. Dandy Nichols, David Hurst and Marjorie Gresley are amusing in other character roles; Derek Bond and Barbara Murray are good as love-birds and Anthony Lang is fit to slaughter as the kid. Under the facile direction of John Paddy Carstairs, the whole lot turn out a rollicking little picture that is loaded with chuckles and guffaws".

Leonard Maltin called the film an "Occasionally funny but overly talky (not to mention outdated) satire".

More recently, the Radio Times wrote, "Prolific comedy director John Paddy Carstairs here turns in a workmanlike, but nevertheless likeable, adaptation of Lesley Storm's stage play."
