= Walter Hudd =

British actor and director (1897–1963)

- Born: Frederick Walter Hudd; 20 February 1897; London, England
- Died: 20 January 1963 (aged 65); London, England
- Years active: 1935–1964

Walter Hudd (20 February 1897 – 20 January 1963) was a British actor and director.

== Stage career ==
Hudd made his stage debut in The Manxman in 1919, and later toured as part of the Fred Terry Company; first attracting serious attention playing Guildenstern in a 1925 modern dress Hamlet. He also later directed plays at Stratford-on-Avon, including Richard II, Twelfth Night (also appearing as Malvolio) and Doctor Faustus (all 1947).

His West End appearances included The Way Things Happen (Ambassadors Theatre 1923), The Ghost Train (Prince of Wales Theatre 1925), The Grain of Mustard Seed (Ambassadors Theatre 1930), Mile Away Murder (Duchess Theatre 1937), Geneva (Saville Theatre 1938), Thunder Rock (St Martin's Theatre 1941), A Month in the Country (New Theatre 1949), The Waltz of the Toreadors (Criterion Theatre 1956) and The Potting Shed (Globe Theatre 1958).

He made his sole Broadway appearance in the Theatre Guild revival of You Never Can Tell (Martin Beck Theatre 1948). He was also a member of the Malvern Festival, Stratford Memorial and Old Vic theatre companies, and in later life became Head of Drama at the Central School of Speech and Drama.

== Film career ==
His film career began in 1935 with Anthony Asquith's Moscow Nights. The following year he was cast as T. E. Lawrence (Lawrence of Arabia) in Alexander Korda's proposed biopic of the celebrated soldier/author, but the production was abandoned. He had previously played a character based on Lawrence in Bernard Shaw's play, Too True to be Good, a performance that had been highly praised by Lawrence himself.

His last two films, The Punch and Judy Man and It's All Happening, were released posthumously.

== Filmography ==
- Moscow Nights (1935) as The Doctor
- Rembrandt (1936) as Capt. Banning Cocq
- Elephant Boy (1937) as Petersen
- Housemaster (1938) as Frank Hastings
- Black Limelight (1939) as Lawrence Crawford
- The Outsider (1939) as Dr. Helmore
- Dead Man's Shoes (1940) as Gaston Alexandri
- Dr. O'Dowd (1940) as Dr. Crowther
- Major Barbara (1941) as Stephen Undershaft
- Uncensored (1942) as Van Heemskirk
- Love Story (1944) as Ray
- I Live in Grosvenor Square (1945) as Vicar
- I Know Where I'm Going! (1945) as Hunter
- Escape (1948) as Defence Counsel
- Paper Orchid (1949) as Briggs
- Landfall (1949) as Professor Legge
- The Importance of Being Earnest (1952) as Lane
- Cosh Boy (1953) as Magistrate (uncredited)
- The Good Die Young (1954) as Dr. Reed
- Cast a Dark Shadow (1955) as The Coroner
- The Adventures of Robin Hood (1956, TV) as The Judge
- Reach for the Sky (1956) as Air Vice-Marshal Halahan
- Satellite in the Sky (1956) as Blandford
- The Last Man to Hang? (1956) as The Judge
- Loser Takes All (1956) as Arnold (uncredited)
- The Man Upstairs (1958) as The Superintendent
- Further Up the Creek (1958) as Consul
- The Two-Headed Spy (1958) as Adm. Canaris
- The Navy Lark (1959) as Naval Captain
- Look Back in Anger (1959) as Actor
- Two-Way Stretch (1960) as Rev. Patterson
- Sink the Bismarck! (1960) as Admiral (HMS Hood)
- The Prince and the Pauper (1962, TV) as Archbishop of Canterbury
- Life for Ruth (1962) as Judge
- The Punch and Judy Man (1963) as Clergyman
- It's All Happening (1963) as J.B. Magdeburg
