= Jimmy Godden (actor) =

British film actor (1879–1955)

- Born: 11 August 1879; Maidstone, Kent; United Kingdom
- Died: 5 March 1955 (aged 75)
- Occupation: Film actor
- Years active: 1930–1941

Jimmy Godden (11 August 1879 – 5 March 1955) was a British film actor.

He was educated at Christ's Hospital and was in the Civil Service before becoming a concert pianist. Godden later turned to the stage and made his debut in pantomime at the Theatre Royal, Plymouth, then going on to the London West End doing a number of comedies and revues.

== Filmography ==
- Big Business (1930) – Oppenheimer
- The Wife's Family (1931) – Doc Knott
- The Last Coupon (1932) – Geordie Bates
- His Wife's Mother (1932) – Mr. Trout
- Money Talks (1932) – Joe Bell
- For the Love of Mike (1932) – Henry Miller
- Crime on the Hill (1933) – Landlord
- Happy (1933) – Brummelberg
- Their Night Out (1933) – Archibald Bunting
- Meet My Sister (1933) – Pogson
- Hawleys of High Street (1933) – Mayor
- The Outcast (1934) – Harry
- Those Were the Days (1934) – Pat Maloney
- The Luck of a Sailor (1934) – Betz
- Sometimes Good (1934) – Colonel Mortimer
- Give Her a Ring (1934) – Uncle Rifkin
- The Great Defender (1934) – Inspector Holmes
- My Song Goes Round the World (1934) – Manager
- Radio Parade of 1935 (1934) – Vere de V. de Vere
- Mister Cinders (1934) – Perkins (uncredited)
- Dandy Dick (1935) – Creecher (uncredited)
- Royal Cavalcade (1935) – Harry
- The Student's Romance (1935) – Bit part
- Lend Me Your Wife (1935) – Uncle Jerry
- I Give My Heart (1935) – Minor role (uncredited)
- Music Hath Charms (1935) – Bit Part (uncredited)
- It's a Bet (1935) – Mayor
- King of the Castle (1936) – Bailiff
- Living Dangerously (1936) – Member of Council
- Once in a Million (1936) – Plume
- Someone at the Door (1936) – Police Constable O'Brien
- The Marriage of Corbal (1936) – Minor Role (uncredited)
- A Star Fell from Heaven (1936) – Undetermined role (uncredited)
- Keep Your Seats, Please (1936) – X-Ray Doctor (uncredited)
- Feather Your Nest (1937) – Mr. Higgins
- Sing as You Swing (1937)
- The Dance of Death (1938)
- Glamour Girl (1938) – Arnold
- Father O'Nine (1938) – Colonel Briggs
- Spare a Copper (1940) – Manager (uncredited)
- The Farmer's Wife (1941) – Sergeant (Last appearance)
