= The Spider (1940 film) =

- Original British trade ad
- Directed by: Maurice Elvey
- Written by: Victor M. Greene; Kenneth Horne; Reginald Long
- Based on: novel The Midnight Mail by Henry Holt
- Produced by: Victor M. Greene
- Starring: Diana Churchill; Derrick De Marney; Jean Gillie; Cecil Parker
- Cinematography: Ernest Palmer
- Production company: Victor M. Greene Productions (as Admiral Films)
- Distributed by: General Film Distributors (UK)
- Release date: 15 April 1940 (UK)
- Running time: 81 minutes
- Country: United Kingdom
- Language: English

The Spider is a 1940 British black-and-white crime film directed by Maurice Elvey and starring Derrick De Marney and Diana Churchill. It was written by Victor M. Greene, Kenneth Horne and Reginald Long based on the 1931 novel The Midnight Mail by Henry Holt, and produced by Admiral Films.

== Synopsis ==
A talent agent whose corrupt actions are uncovered by his business partner murders him. A young woman witnesses the murder. The talent agent attacks her, she is traumatised and loses her memory. After she is released from hospital, the talent agent resumes his chase, but a detective and his wife intervene.

== Cast ==
- Derrick De Marney as Gilbert Silver
- Diana Churchill as Sally Silver
- Jean Gillie as Clare Marley
- Cecil Parker as Lawrence Bruce
- Frank Cellier as Julian Ismay
- Allan Jeayes as George Hackett
- Edward Lexy as Inspector Horridge
- Jack Melford as Duke
- Jack Lambert as Smith
- Anthony Holles as Bath's manager
- Moira Lynd as nurse

== Reception ==
The Monthly Film Bulletin wrote: "The ingredients of this plot are familiar but well mixed. There is no lack of incident, and thrills abound. The element of suspense is absent since the audience knows the identity of the criminal, but this does not greatly matter. There is the familiar bickering and back-chat between Silver and his devoted but over-zealous wife, and Diana Churchill and Derrick de Marney make an effective pair. The latter looks rather too boyish for an experienced detective, but both give good performances. Cecil Parker is a sinister and unmistakable villain, and the team work of the supporting players is excellent."

Kine Weekly wrote: "In this comedy melodrama the audience is permitted to accompany the villain on his murder rampage and, at the same time, hunt with the police. The story arrangement does not encourage suspense, but the many spectacular thrills, and these include the murder of Ismay, the second attempt on Claire Marley's life, and Bruce's timely fall from a train, as well as the snappy marital comedy, represented by the cross-talk between Silver and 'Sally, more than make good the loss. Although the entertainment does not end a moment too soon, it has all the masses demand and more. The staging is first-class in every particular."

Variety wrote: "Stereotyped murder yarn. ... Picture carries a roster of names w.k. [well-known] in English legit, yet some of these players are rarely natural. Against their stagey style of playing, Diana Churchill's class handling of her role shows well her film experience, and lack of it in featured associates. Jean Gillie impresses as a likely camera face but has little opnortunity to show her ability. Production is excellent and costly. Camera is standard, sound poor."
