= Flora Newton =

British film editor

- Occupation: Film editor
- Years active: 1936–1947

Flora Newton was a British film editor. Newton was employed by ABPC at their Elstree and Welwyn Studios. She was one of a growing number of women editors working in the British film industry at the time.

== Filmography ==
- Living Dangerously (1936)
- A Star Fell from Heaven (1936)
- The Dominant Sex (1937)
- Glamorous Night (1937)
- Housemaster (1938)
- Oh Boy! (1938)
- Yellow Sands (1938)
- Let's Make a Night of It (1938)
- Over She Goes (1938)
- The Outsider (1939)
- Poison Pen (film) (1939)
- Just like a Woman (1939)
- Bulldog Sees It Through (1940)
- Tower of Terror (1941)
- East of Piccadilly (1941)
- Spring Meeting (1941)
- The Farmer's Wife (1941)
- Banana Ridge (1942)
- The Night Has Eyes (1942)
- Suspected Person (1942)
- Warn That Man (1943)
- Somewhere in Civvies (1943)
- Thursday's Child (1943)
- The Man from Morocco (1945)
- Night Boat to Dublin (1946)
- Quiet Weekend (1946)
- Piccadilly Incident (1946)
- The Courtneys of Curzon Street (1947)

== Bibliography ==
Harper, Sue. Women in British Cinema: Mad, Bad and Dangerous to Know. A&C Black, 2000.
