= The Middle Watch (1940 film) =

1940 film by Thomas Bentley

- Directed by: Thomas Bentley
- Written by: Clifford Grey; J. Lee Thompson
- Based on: play by Ian Hay; Stephen King-Hall
- Produced by: Walter C. Mycroft
- Starring: Jack Buchanan; Greta Gynt; Fred Emney; Kay Walsh
- Cinematography: Claude Friese-Greene
- Edited by: Monica Kimick
- Production company: ABPC
- Distributed by: Pathé Pictures International
- Release date: 11 May 1940
- Running time: 87 minutes
- Country: United Kingdom
- Language: English

The Middle Watch is a 1940 British comedy film, directed by Thomas Bentley and starring Jack Buchanan, Greta Gynt, Fred Emney and Kay Walsh. It was written by Clifford Grey and J. Lee Thompson based on the 1930 play of the same title by Ian Hay and Stephen King-Hall which had previously been adapted as a film in 1930, and which was adapted again in 1958.

It was produced by Associated British Picture Corporation at their Welwyn Studios.

== Synopsis ==
Battleship Captain Maitland celebrates a bon voyage party. He later discovers two stowaways, attractive young women, but much too late to turn back. Despite the captain's efforts to hide them, they are soon discovered, with predictable consequences.

== Cast ==
- Jack Buchanan as Captain Maitland
- Greta Gynt as Mary Carlton
- Fred Emney as Admiral Sir Reginald Hewett
- Kay Walsh as Fay Featon
- David Hutcheson as Commander Baddeley
- Leslie Fuller as Marine Ogg
- Bruce Seton as Captain Randall
- Martita Hunt as Lady Elizabeth Hewett
- Louise Hampton as Charlotte Hopkinson
- Romney Brent as Ah Fong
- Jean Gillie as Betty Hewett
- Ronald Shiner as the ship's engineer
- Reginald Purdell as Corporal Duckett

== Reception ==
The Monthly Film Bulletin wrote: "The Director has been content with a new cast to follow a familiar pattern, and the in-and-out bedroom chase is on time-honoured lines. The fun is neither fast nor furious, and completely lacking in subtlety, but it is quite harmless and amusing in its own way. The cast works hard and loyally. Fred Emney is in great form, and if he is quite unlike an Admiral is highly entertaining as himself. Jack Buchanan is curiously subdued, but has his moments, and Greta Gynt makes an attractive heroine."

Kine Weekly wrote: "Fun without offence is the film's worthy objective, and it achieves its aim through the amiability of its star, the eager versatility of its popular and talented supporting team and the resourcefulness of its director. It has the spice of sex without its limitations. Good settings decorate the laughable gambol."
