= Geoffrey Kerr =

British actor and playwright (1895–1971)

- Born: Geoffrey Kemble Grinham Keen; 26 January 1895; London, England
- Died: 1 July 1971 (aged 76); Aldershot, Hampshire, England
- Occupations: Actor and writer
- Years active: 1917–1956
- Spouse: June Walker
- Children: John Kerr (1931–2013)

Geoffrey Kerr (born Geoffrey Kemble Grinham Keen; 26 January 1895 – 1 July 1971) was a British stage and film actor and writer during the middle of the 20th century.

== Early life ==
Geoffrey Kemble Grinham Keen was born on 26 January 1895, in London, the son of character actor and theatrical manager Frederick Kerr and his wife Lucy Houghton Keen, née Dowson. His younger sister was the actor Molly Kerr. He was educated at Charterhouse School, where his father had been a pupil, and was intending to join the Civil Service until he wrote and appeared in a very successful school play and decided on a career in the theatre.

At the start of World War I, he obtained a commission in the Shropshire Light Infantry, and saw active service in the trenches. A friend from his theatre days before the war arranged for him to receive training in the Royal Flying Corps but he was wounded when his plane crashed and spent the remainder of the war as an instructor in aerial gunnery with the rank of Captain. In 1920, he travelled to the United States for the first time to appear with his father on Broadway. From that point on for the remainder of the 1920s, he travelled back and forth across the Atlantic quite often, appearing on Broadway in New York City, and making silent films back home in Britain.

== Stage career ==
On Broadway, as Geoffrey Kerr, he performed in such plays as The Stork (1925) and London Calling, the latter which he wrote. He also directed occasionally, and co-starred with wife June Walker on Broadway in The Bachelor Father (1928). He ended his acting career in 1934, though he did appear in a play on Broadway in 1949–50, to celebrate the silver Broadway anniversary of the two stars Alfred Lunt and Lynn Fontanne.

- Just Suppose, playing George (1 November 1920 – January ?, 1921)
- East of Suez, playing Harold Knox (21 September 1922 – December ?, 1922)
- You and I, playing Roderick White (19 February 1923 – June ?, 1923)
- The Changelings, playing Wicky Faber (17 September 1923 – January ?, 1924)
- In His Arms, playing Ernest Fairleigh (13 October 1924 – November ?, 1924)
- The Stork, playing Lionel Deport (26 January 1925 – February ?, 1925)
- 'First Love", playing Jean (8 November 1926 – December ?, 1926)
- The Bachelor Father, playing John Ashley (28 February 1928 – October ?, 1928)
- Ada Beats the Drum, directed by Geoffrey Kerr (8 May 1930 – June ?, 1930)
- London Calling, written by Geoffrey Kerr, playing George Craft (18 October 1930 – October ?, 1930)
- This is New York, playing Joseph Gresham Jr. (28 November 1930 – January ?, 1931)
- Collision, playing Dr. Gestzi (16 February 1932 – February ?, 1932)
- We Are No Longer Children, playing Jean Servin (31 March 1932 – April ?, 1932)
- Domino, playing Cremone (16 August 1932 – August ?, 1932)
- Foolscap, staged by Geoffrey Kerr, playing Shakespeare (11 January 1933 – January ?, 1933)
- Yellow Jack, playing Stackpoole (6 March 1934 – May 1934)
- I Know My Love, playing Frederic Chanler (2 November 1949 – 3 June 1950)

== Film career ==
Geoffrey Kerr became known in the film industry when he co-starred with his father in the British silent film 12.10 (1919), although he did appear in several other silent films prior to that. Most of his silent films were British productions; the "talkies" in 1931 were US productions.

- The Profligate (1917) .... Wilfred
- 12.10 (1919) .... Geoffrey Brooke
- The Usurper (1919) .... Bonamy Tredgold
- Torn Sails (1920) .... Ivor Parry
- The Great Day (1920) .... Dave Leeson
- The Mirage (1920) .... Richard Dalziell
- Love's Boomerang (1922) .... Saville Mender
- The Man from Home (1922) .... Horace Granger-Simpson
- Just Suppose (1926) .... Count Anton Teschy
- Women Love Once (1931) .... Allen Greenough
- The Runaround (1931) .... Fred
- Once a Lady (1931) .... Jimmy Fenwick (final film role)

== Writing career ==
From 1935 until the late 1940s, Kerr was a screenwriter and playwright; he also wrote several British television productions in the early 1950s. His best-known film credits include Rene Clair's Break the News (1938), the wartime comedy/melodrama Cottage to Let (1941), and the period drama Jassy (1947). One of Kerr's screenplays from 1936 resurfaced in 1988 as the British TV production, The Tenth Man. His 1947 play The Man in the Street was staged in the West End.

His credits include:

- The Ghost Goes West (1935) (scenario)
- Weekend Millionaire (1935) (writer) ... aka Once in a Million (UK original title)
- The Tenth Man (1936) (writer)
- A Star Fell from Heaven (1936) (writer)
- Living Dangerously (1936) (writer)
- Break the News (1938) (writer)
- Sweet Devil (1938) (writer)
- Under Your Hat (1940) (his play adapted for film)
- Bombsight Stolen (1941) (his play adapted for film) ... aka Cottage to Let (UK original title)
- Jassy (1947) (writer)
- The Calendar (1948) (writer)
- Fools Rush In (1949) (writer)
- The Monster of Killoon (1952) (British television play)
- My Husband and I (1956) British TV series (writer of an unknown number of episodes)

In addition, Kerr wrote a fantasy novel, Under the Influence (1954), about a London bank cashier who can read people's minds, but only when drunk. Kerr attempted to co-write a screenplay with George S. Kaufman based on that novel, but the screenplay remained unfinished.

== Personal life ==
He married June Walker in 1926. They had one child in 1931, a son, John Kerr, who also became an actor but later qualified as a lawyer, like his grandfather. He separated from his wife in 1938, and they divorced in 1943.

== Death ==
Geoffrey Kerr died 1 July 1971, in Aldershot, Hampshire, England, aged 76.
