= Dishonour Bright =

1936 British film by Tom Wallis

- Trade advertisement
- Directed by: Tom Walls
- Written by: Ben Travers
- Produced by: Hermann Fellner; Max Schach
- Starring: Tom Walls; Eugene Pallette; Betty Stockfeld; Diana Churchill
- Cinematography: Philip Tannura
- Edited by: Walter Stokvis
- Music by: Peter Mendoza; Boyd Neel
- Production company: Cecil Films
- Distributed by: General Film Distributors
- Release date: 22 September 1936
- Running time: 83 minutes
- Country: United Kingdom
- Language: English

Dishonour Bright is a 1936 British comedy film directed by and starring Tom Walls, Eugene Pallette, Betty Stockfeld and Diana Churchill. It was written by Ben Travers, and made at Denham Studios. The film's art direction was by Thomas N. Morahan.

== Plot ==
Stephen Champion is cited as the co-respondent in a divorce case, but is cheerfully unashamed when he appears in court. During the case he strikes up a flirtatious relationship with Stella Crane, the wife of one of the lawyers. Nonetheless he marries his lover when her divorce comes through. While on his European honeymoon, he comes to Stella's assistance when she is nearly trapped by a cad and his blackmailing associate. Yet it takes some time to convince both his own wife and her husband that his conduct has been entirely honourable.

== Cast ==
- Tom Walls as Stephen Champion
- Eugene Pallette as Busby
- Betty Stockfeld as Stella Crane
- Diana Churchill as Ivy Lamb
- Cecil Parker as Vincent Crane
- Arthur Wontner as Judge
- George Sanders as Lisle
- Henry Oscar as Blenkinsop
- Hubert Harben as Lamb
- Mabel Terry-Lewis as Lady Melbury
- Basil Radford as Henry Crane
- Charlotte Leigh as Miss Tapp
- Michael Morel as Louis
- Dennis Val Norton as commissionaire
- Jeni Le Gon as cabaret dancer

== Critical reception ==
The Monthly Film Bulletin wrote: "Obviously this is not a film for the immature; but the seasoned comedy-lover will find a great deal of humour in this picture, the mood of which is half-way between comedy and farce. The story is well put together, with no dragging-in of stock farcical situations; the cast is cleverly chosen and acts well. Tom Walls's skill as a director deserves as much praise as his accomplished acting."

Kine Weekly wrote: "'Sparkling sex comedy, the gay story of which cuts merry capers on thin ice to the tune of piquant light entertainment. Based on the adage, 'Give a dog a bad name,' the plot is as near the mark as it is possible to get, but so cunningly have Ben Travers the author, and Tom Walls, the star, handled it, that there is plenty of laughter to insulate its shocks. It is risque yet inoffensive, fun, designed to divert and amuse all classes."

Picture Show wrote: "Gay sophisticated comedy which holds a laugh in every foot. ... Delicious situations and gay romantic incident are helped by the witty dialogue and smooth direction. It is beautifully set and finely photographed, and altogether is a first-class British production. Tom Walls is at the top of his form, delivering his dialogue with his inimitable manner, and he has the benefit of an excellent supporting cast."

Writing in 1936, Variety described the film as a "bedroom comedy of a quality of which Hollywood would not be ashamed. With stellar values it would have been a pushover. Even in its existing shape it is a highly titillating piece of merchandise, expertly produced and neatly directed, that will tickle the more sophisticated audience on both sides of the Atlantic".
