= The Man in the Street (play) =

Play by Geoffrey Kerr

- Original language: English
- Written by: Geoffrey Kerr
- Genre: Comedy
- Setting: England, present day

Premiere
- Date: 8 September 1947
- Place: Manchester Opera House

The Man in the Street is a comedy play by the British writer Geoffrey Kerr. It first appeared at the Manchester Opera House before transferring to the St James's Theatre in London's West End where it ran for 44 performances between 9 October and 15 November 1947. Presented by the impresario Basil Dean the West End cast included Bobby Howes, Lloyd Pearson, Edward Jewesbury, Kynaston Reeves, Charles Lloyd Pack, Helen Christie and Beryl Measor. The play revolved an ordinary man of the people being celebrated by a newspaper proprietor. While The New Statesman described it as "slick and frequently amusing comedy" the review in The Spectator was more critical.

== Bibliography ==
- Wearing, J. P. The London Stage 1940–1949: A Calendar of Productions, Performers, and Personnel. Rowman & Littlefield, 2014.
