= School for Husbands =

- Directed by: Andrew Marton
- Written by: Frederick J. Jackson (play); Austin Melford; Gordon Sherry
- Produced by: Richard Wainwright
- Starring: Rex Harrison; Diana Churchill; June Clyde; Henry Kendall
- Cinematography: Philip Tannura
- Music by: Allan Gray
- Production company: Richard Wainwright Productions
- Distributed by: General Film Distributors
- Release date: 12 August 1937
- Running time: 71 minutes
- Country: United Kingdom
- Language: English

School for Husbands (also known as School for Husbands: A Comedy for Wives) is a 1937 British comedy film directed by Andrew Marton and starring Rex Harrison, Diana Churchill and June Clyde. It was written by Austin Melford and Gordon Sherry based on the 1932 play School for Husbands by Frederick J. Jackson.

The film was an independent production which was shot at Shepperton Studios. It was distributed by the newly-formed General Film Distributors.

The film was re-released in Britain in 1946.

== Synopsis ==
Two married men who neglect their wives become concerned when they begin spending time with Leonard Drummond, a handsome and charming novelist with a notorious reputation as a womaniser. They hatch a plan to see if their wives are conducting affairs which involves pretending to go to Paris then returning unexpectedly. However complications ensue when their car breaks down on the way back from Newhaven. The long night that follows really becomes a test of the fidelity and love of their wives.

== Cast ==
- Rex Harrison as Leonard Drummond
- Diana Churchill as Marion Carter
- June Clyde as Diana Cheswick
- Henry Kendall as Geoffrey Carter
- Romney Brent as Morgan Cheswick
- Roxie Russell as Kate
- Richard Goolden as Whittaker
- Phil Thomas as chauffeur
- Judith Gick as Joan
- Joan Kemp-Welch as maid
- Clive Baxter as boy

== Reception ==
The Monthly Film Bulletin wrote: "The unreal situations that are appropriate to farcical comedy need careful casting and good acting (as well as slick direction) in order to create the right effect. Diana Churchill (whose clever acting is one of the chief merits of the film), Rex Harrison and Henry Kendall are admirable in both respects; June Clyde and Romney Brent (the other couple) do not seem to fit quite so naturally into this atmosphere but are well directed."

Kine Weekly wrote: "Snappy, sophisticated comedy, presenting a new and piquant interpretation of the marriage circle theme. Fundamentally the film is a conversation piece, but thanks to polished acting, smart dialogues and resourceful direction, smooth momentum is assured. Irrepressible laughter is backed by irresistible feminine appeal."
