= The Outsider (1939 film) =

1939 British drama film directed by Paul L. Stein

- Australian film poster
- Directed by: Paul L. Stein
- Written by: Dudley Leslie
- Based on: The Outsider by Dorothy Brandon
- Produced by: Walter C. Mycroft
- Starring: George Sanders; Mary Maguire; Peter Murray-Hill
- Cinematography: Günther Krampf
- Edited by: Flora Newton
- Music by: Kenneth Leslie-Smith
- Production company: Associated British Picture Corporation
- Distributed by: Associated British Picture Corporation
- Release date: 30 January 1939
- Running time: 90 minutes
- Country: United Kingdom
- Language: English

The Outsider is a 1939 British drama film directed by Paul L. Stein and starring George Sanders, Mary Maguire and Barbara Blair. It was written by Dudley Leslie based on the 1923 play of the same name by Dorothy Brandon. The screenplay concerns an osteopath who cures one of his patients with whom he has fallen in love. It is a remake of the 1931 film The Outsider, and was shot at Elstree Studios with sets designed by the art director Cedric Dawe.

== Plot ==
Anton Ragatzy is an infamous osteopath, known for his controversial methods of curing disability. Ragatzy uses a machine invented by himself which will either cure the patients permanently or will leave them disabled forever.

A board of surgeons disagree with Ragatzy's methods and want to ban him from acting as an osteopath. Ragatzy wants to change their minds and decides to cure the daughter of one of the surgeons, Joseph Sturdee. Lalage "Lally" Sturdee has been disabled since birth and lives with her fiercely protective father. She composes famous musical scores and is in love with her close friend Basil.

Ragatzy manages to meet Lally and offers her treatment, but she refuses. However, when she sees Basil and her friends having fun swimming while she is unable to join in, she changes her mind and contacts Ragatzy. Ragatzy promises to help her and invites her to live in his house for one year while the treatment takes place so that she can receive the best care.

Ragatzy knows of Lally's love for Basil and believes that it will help in her treatment. Basil has fallen in love with another woman, Wendy, but continues to visit Lally out of a sense of duty. Ragatzy finds that he is falling in love with Lally, but keeps his distance. Basil promises to visit Lally on New Year's Eve but instead sees the New Year in with Wendy. To spare her feelings, Ragatzy buys flowers for Lally and pretends they are from Basil.

Lally completes her treatment and Ragatzy arranges for the board of surgeons to be present while Lally takes her first steps. Basil promises Wendy that if Lally can walk, he will marry her, but if Lally is still disabled, he must stay with her. Ragatzy and Lally realise their feelings for each other. He helps her to her feet, but the surgeons are still suspicious. Ragatzy encourages Lalage to walk, but she confesses that she can't. The surgeons leave and Lally carries on trying to walk but keeps falling. Ragatzy expresses his frustration that he will now be unable to carry on practising, while Lally is furious that Ragatzy is only concerned with his reputation. Joseph Sturdee arrives and is angered that his daughter is disabled for life, and hits Ragatzy. Lally hears the commotion and walks over to defend Ragatzy. The film ends with Lally united with her father and Ragatzy.

== Main cast ==
- George Sanders as Anton Ragatzy
- Mary Maguire as Lalage Sturdee
- Barbara Blair as Wendy
- Peter Murray-Hill as Basil Owen
- Frederick Leister as Joseph Sturdee
- Walter Hudd as Dr. Helmore
- Kathleen Harrison as Mrs. Coates
- Kynaston Reeves as Sir Montague Tollemach
- Edmund Breon as Dr. Ladd
- Ralph Truman as Sir Nathan Israel

== Reception ==
The Monthly Film Bulletin wrote: "The theme is thought-provoking and gripping, and the climax is extremely effective and suspenseful theatre. The battle between charlatanism and bigotry is well presented, with both sides satirised. Sympathetic and sensitive direction makes impressive highlights of inherently emotional situations. The dramatic effect would have been heightened with more compression. ... George Sanders is outstandingly good as Ragatzy."

Kine Weekly wrote: "Character drawing is outstanding, direction sensitive and technical presentation excellent. The parable is both entertaining and popular. ... Holding, thought-provoking and entertaining story, first-class performances by principal players, fine climax, human and feminine angles and powerful star and title values."
