= King of the Castle (1936 film) =

- June Clyde and Billy Milton in a cover story on the film in Picture Show magazine
- Directed by: Redd Davis
- Written by: Frank Atkinson; George Dewhurst
- Produced by: Basil Humphrys
- Starring: June Clyde; Claude Dampier; Billy Milton
- Cinematography: Ronald Neame
- Music by: Eric Spear
- Production company: City Film Corporation
- Distributed by: General Film Distributors
- Release date: February 1936
- Running time: 69 minutes
- Country: United Kingdom
- Language: English

King of the Castle is a 1936 British comedy film directed by Redd Davis and starring June Clyde, Claude Dampier and Billy Milton. It was written by Frank Atkinson and George Dewhurst, and shot at Shepperton Studios as a quota quickie.

== Plot ==
Monty King, a lowly clerk at Trellis and Co., meets Marilyn, the daughter of Henry Bean, a wealthy American representative of his company, and falls in love with her. Monty's boss Sir Percival Trellis is also keen on Marilyn, so he and Bean decide to pack Monty off to America. However, a butler recognises Monty from a newspaper picture as Lord Drone, the missing heir to a castle and estate, and together with Marilyn he helps Monty stake his claim to inherit the property.

== Cast ==
- June Clyde as Marilyn Bean
- Claude Dampier as Pullen
- Billy Milton as Monty King
- Cynthia Stock as Elsie
- Wally Patch as Trout
- Arthur Finn as Henry Bean
- Paul Blake as Sir Percival Trellis
- H. F. Maltby as Mr. Crow
- Mavis Villiers as Billie
- Jimmy Godden as bailiff

== Reception ==
The Monthly Film Bulletin wrote: "Entertainment values are dependent mainly on characterisation. Billy Milton and June Clyde make a living and pleasant pair of lovers. Claude Dampier gives a characteristic performance, and gets all the laughs possible out of his part. They are ably supported by a versatile cast. The direction is workmanlike if not very subtle."

Kine Weekly wrote: "The vulnerable points in the play's make-up are represented by a trite story and feeble Americanised dialogue, but these fortunately are not enough to remove entirely from the picture the capacity to provide homely light entertainment."

The Daily Film Renter wrote: "Amusing comedy confection revolving round young clerk who turns out to be missing heir to peerage. Billy Milton and June Clyde play romantic leads with zest, while Claude Dampier gives richly funny and characteristic study as eccentric 'gentleman's gentleman'."
