= Walter Stokvis =

British film editor

- Occupation: Editor
- Years active: 1930-1939 (film)

Walter Stokvis was a British film editor of the 1930s, working mainly at the Elstree Studios of British International Pictures.

== Selected filmography ==
- Suspense (1930)
- The Flying Fool (1931)
- The Woman Between (1931)
- Strip! Strip! Hooray!!! (1932)
- The Indiscretions of Eve (1932)
- Arms and the Man (1932)
- Sleepless Nights (1932)
- Their Night Out (1933)
- The Scotland Yard Mystery (1934)
- My Song Goes Round the World (1934)
- The Student's Romance (1935)
- Abdul the Damned (1935)
- The Marriage of Corbal (1936)
- Dishonour Bright (1936)
- Pagliacci (1936)
- Luck of the Navy (1938)
- Yes, Madam? (1939)

== Bibliography ==
- Brown, Geoff. Launder and Gilliat. British Film Institute, 1977.
