= The Human Touch =

Play by D Leslie and JL Thompson

- Original language: English
- Written by: Dudley Leslie; J. Lee Thompson
- Genre: Drama

Premiere
- Date: 17 May 1948
- Place: Liverpool Playhouse

The Human Touch is a play by Dudley Leslie and J. Lee Thompson.

After premiering at the Liverpool Playhouse in May 1948, it later had a West End run of 113 performances at the Savoy Theatre between February and June 1949. The cast included Alec Guinness, John Gregson, John Laurie, Milton Rosmer, Kynaston Reeves, Sophie Stewart and Adrienne Corri. Guinness starred as a doctor who pioneers the use of chloroform as an anaesthetic during operations, but meets with huge resistance from established medical figures.

Variety called it "an interesting study".

A TV version with James Donald was shot at Elstree in 1952. On April 15, 1956, a televised adaptation was shown on Front Row Center on CBS.

== Bibliography ==
- Wearing, J.P. The London Stage 1940-1949: A Calendar of Productions, Performers, and Personnel. Rowman & Littlefield, 2014.
