= Front Row Center =

- Genre: Variety
- Directed by: Milt Douglas; Fletcher Markle
- Country of origin: United States
- Original language: English

Production
- Producer: Fletcher Markle
- Camera setup: Multi-camera
- Running time: 30 minutes (March 1949–June 1949); 60 minutes (June 1949–April 1950)

Original release
- Network: DuMont Television Network
- Release: March 25, 1949 – April 2, 1950

Front Row Center is the title of two American television programs with different formats that were broadcast on different networks.

== DuMont version ==
Front Row Center, an American variety show, aired on the DuMont Television Network from March 25, 1949, to April 2, 1950, The program was a renamed version of Hotel Broadway, with Whelan Drug Company continuing as sponsor, but with a new slot on DuMont's schedule. It initially was on from 9 to 9:30 p.m. Eastern Time on Fridays. In June 1949 it moved to 8-9 p.m. ET on Fridays, and in October 1949 it moved to 7-8 p.m. ET on Sundays.

Originally 30 minutes, the sustaining program expanded to 60 minutes on June 10, 1949, and DuMont personnel began seeking entertainers in an effort to make the program "television's standout talent quest show." That quest included holding auditions at DuMont's Adelphi Playhouse in New York City.

The premiere episode featured Marilyn Maxwell in her television debut.

One surviving episode from late 1949 is held at the UCLA Film & Television Archive.

=== Personnel ===
Frank Fontaine was the host. Regulars on the program were Marian Bruce, Joan Fields, Cass Franklin, Phil Leeds, Hal Lohman, Monica Moore, Bibi Osterwald, and Danny Shore.

Bill Harmon was the program's producer and director, and Stanton B. Fisher also directed. Sam Spear and his 14-piece orchestra provided music.

== CBS version ==
Front Row Center was a dramatic anthology series on CBS that originally ran from June 1, 1955, to September 21, 1955, and returned from January 8, 1956 until April 22, 1956. In 1955 the program was broadcast every Wednesday from 10 to 11 p.m. ET through June, after which it alternated in that time slot with The United States Steel Hour. Episodes from January to April 1956 were broadcast on Sunday afternoons.

Fletcher Markle was the director. Episodes were live adaptations of Broadway plays or literary works. They included the following:

- June 1, 1955 - "Dinner at Eight" - Mary Astor, Everett Sloane, Pat O'Brien, Mary Beth Hughes
- June 15, 1955 - "Ah, Wilderness!" - Leon Ames, Lillian Hellman
- September 7, 1955 - "Tender is the Night" - Mercedes McCambridge, James Daly
- January 8, 1956 - "Finley's Fan Club" -Diana Lynn, Eddie Bracken
- April 15, 1956 - "The Human Touch" - Lisa Kirk

=== Critical response ===
Jack Gould wrote in The New York Times that the presentation of "Dinner at Eight" "was hurt by editing and uneven casting; it was warmed-over fare, lacking real substance." He described Sloane's acting as "a good performance."

== See also ==
- List of programs broadcast by the DuMont Television Network
- List of surviving DuMont Television Network broadcasts
- 1949-50 United States network television schedule

== Bibliography ==
- David Weinstein, The Forgotten Network: DuMont and the Birth of American Television (Philadelphia: Temple University Press, 2004) ISBN 1-59213-245-6
