= Barbara Blair =

American actress (1911–1976)

- Born: March 17, 1911; New York, New York, United States
- Died: May 25, 1976 (aged 65); New York, New York
- Occupation: Actress
- Years active: 1930 - 1952 (film)

Barbara Blair (1911–1976) was an American actress on film and on stage. She played leading and supporting roles in several British films including The Outsider (1939).

Blair appeared on stage in New York, and in the musical comedy Take It Easy in London.

Blair married a London financier, becoming Barbara Blair Phillips.

== Selected filmography ==
- Star of the Circus (1938)
- The Outsider (1939)
- Lucky to Me (1939)
- Bedelia (1946)
- Tall Headlines (1952)

== Bibliography ==
- Goble, Alan. The Complete Index to Literary Sources in Film. Walter de Gruyter, 1999.
