= Cedric Dawe =

British art director (1906–1996)

- Born: 2 June 1906; Wandsworth, London, United Kingdom
- Died: 10 February 1996 (aged 89); Chartridge, Buckinghamshire, United Kingdom
- Occupation: Art director
- Years active: 1933-1970 (film & TV)

Cedric Dawe (1906–1996) was a British art director. He worked on the set design of over sixty films during his career, spending many years working for ABPC at the company's Elstree and Welwyn Studios. He was praised for his realistic designs for Lance Comfort's 1947 film noir Temptation Harbour. Towards the end of his career he also worked in television, as art director on series such as Colonel March of Scotland Yard, Department S and The Saint.

While under employment at Elstree in the 1930s, he along with Duncan Sutherland and Peter Proud worked under the direction of Clarence Elder.

== Selected filmography ==
- Freedom of the Seas (1934)
- The Student's Romance (1935)
- Mimi (1935)
- Living Dangerously (1936)
- Ourselves Alone (1936)
- The Price of Folly (1937)
- The Dominant Sex (1937)
- The Terror (1938)
- The Outsider (1939)
- Yes, Madam? (1939)
- Temptation Harbour (1947)
- Once Upon a Dream (1949)
- Traveller's Joy (1950)
- So Long at the Fair (1950)
- Another Man's Poison (1951)
- Home to Danger (1951)
- The Happy Family (1952)
- Street Corner (1953)
- Man of the Moment (1955)

== Bibliography ==
- Ede, Laurie N. British Film Design: A History. I.B.Tauris, 2010.
- McFarlane, Brian. Lance Comfort. Manchester University Press, 1999.
