= Harry Acres =

British composer of film scores

- Occupations: Composer, musical director
- Years active: 1932–1954 (film)

Harry Alexander Acres (19 January 19, 1897 – October 1968) was a British composer of film scores. He was musical director for a number of years during the 1930s at British International Pictures's Elstree Studios. Acres tended to be involved with the studio's light comedies and musicals, rather than more serious and expensive historical films.

Acres also worked as musical director for several Ivor Novello stage musicals including The Dancing Years.

== Selected filmography ==
- Facing the Music (1933)
- Oh Boy! (1938)
- Over She Goes (1938)
- Hold My Hand (1938)
- Lucky to Me (1939)
- Under Your Hat (1940)
- East of Piccadilly (1941)
- Banana Ridge (1942)

== Bibliography ==
- Wearing, J.P. The London Stage 1940-1949: A Calendar of Productions, Performers, and Personnel. Rowman & Littlefield, 2014.
