= Walter C. Mycroft =

British film producer (1890–1959)

- Born: Walter Charles Mycroft; 1890; England
- Died: 14 June, 1959 (aged 68–69); England
- Occupations: Writer, film producer, film director

Walter Charles Mycroft (1890 – 14 June 1959) was a British journalist, screenwriter, film producer and director. In the 1920s he was film critic of the London Evening Standard, and a founder of the London Film Society, before joining the film industry.

In 1928 he became Literary Adviser and Scenario Editor at the newly founded studio British International Pictures at Elstree, sometimes working with his friend Alfred Hitchcock. He was by his own account the principal author of Hitchcock's first BIP film The Ring (1927), and credited as the author of the original story on which Champagne (1928) was based. Their friendship does not seem to have survived their collaboration.

Mycroft was elevated to head of production at Elstree during the 1930s, during which time BIP was reconstituted as the Associated British Picture Corporation. The company released many films on which Mycroft was credited as producer, with varying levels of actual involvement.

His adopted son, David Rees Mycroft, worked as assistant director on a number of Elstree productions. David Mycroft, who is not mentioned in Walter Mycroft's autobiography The Time of My Life, edited by Vincent Porter and published posthumously, was an experimental filmmaker, poet and psychologist who studied with R.D. Laing. David Mycroft's daughter Ruth Novaczek is a British experimental film maker.

Screenwriter Charles Bennett called him "a horrible little man... Hitch very cruelly used to say of Mycroft – Mycroft was a hunchback – and Hitch very cruelly used to say: 'If you break his back open you'll find chocolates!'"

== Selected filmography ==
=== Producer ===
- Carmen (1931)
- Sleepless Nights (1932)
- His Wife's Mother (1932)
- For the Love of Mike (1932)
- Hawley's of High Street (1933)
- Red Wagon (1933)
- A Southern Maid (1933)
- Freedom of the Seas (1934)
- The Old Curiosity Shop (1934)
- Give Her a Ring (1934)
- I Spy (1934)
- Girls Will Be Boys (1934)
- What Happened Then? (1934)
- The Warren Case (1934)
- My Old Duchess (1934)
- Over the Garden Wall (1934)
- The Great Defender (1934)
- The Luck of a Sailor (1934)
- Drake of England (1935)
- The Student's Romance (1935)
- It's a Bet (1935)
- Mimi (1935)
- McGlusky the Sea Rover (1935)
- Music Hath Charms (1935)
- Invitation to the Waltz (1935)
- Heart's Desire (1935)
- A Star Fell from Heaven (1936)
- Living Dangerously (1936)
- Spring Handicap (1937)
- The Dominant Sex (1937)
- Aren't Men Beasts! (1937)
- Premiere (1938)
- Star of the Circus (1938)
- Hold My Hand (1938)
- Queer Cargo (1938)
- Jane Steps Out (1938)
- Oh Boy! (1938)
- Marigold (1938)
- Murder in Soho (1939)
- Hell's Cargo (1939)
- The Outsider (1939)
- Just like a Woman (1939)
- The House of the Arrow (1940)
- The Middle Watch (1940)
- Dead Man's Shoes (1940)
- The Flying Squad (1940)
- The Woman's Angle (1952)

=== Director ===
- My Wife's Family (1941)
- Spring Meeting (1941)
- Banana Ridge (1942)
- Comin' Thro the Rye (1947)

=== Screenwriter ===
- Murder! (1930) directed by Alfred Hitchcock
- The Man from Chicago (1930)
- Dreyfus (1931)
- Keepers of Youth (1931)
- Let's Love and Laugh (1931)
- Carmen (1931)
- Money for Nothing (1932)
- Love and Luck (1932)
- The Phantom Shot (1947)
