= 1927 Dartmouth Indians football team =

American college football season

1927 Dartmouth Indians football
- Conference: Independent
- Record: 7–1
- Head coach: Jesse Hawley (5th season)
- Captain: Robert MacPhail
- Home stadium: Memorial Field

1927 Eastern college football independents records
	Conf.			Overall
Team	W	L	T	W		L		T
Tufts		–		8	–	0	–	0
Springfield		–		7	–	0	–	2
Washington & Jefferson		–		7	–	0	–	2
No. 6 Army		–		9	–	1	–	0
No. 2 Pittsburgh		–		8	–	1	–	1
Temple		–		7	–	1	–	0
No. 5 Yale		–		7	–	1	–	0
NYU		–		7	–	1	–	2
Princeton		–		6	–	1	–	0
Villanova		–		6	–	1	–	0
Penn State		–		6	–	2	–	1
Columbia		–		5	–	2	–	2
Bucknell		–		6	–	3	–	1
Colgate		–		4	–	2	–	3
CCNY		–		4	–	2	–	2
Lafayette		–		5	–	3	–	1
Penn		–		6	–	4	–	0
Syracuse		–		5	–	3	–	2
Carnegie Tech		–		5	–	4	–	1
Boston College		–		4	–	4	–	0
Harvard		–		4	–	4	–	0
Rutgers		–		4	–	4	–	0
Cornell		–		3	–	3	–	2
Boston University		–		3	–	4	–	1
Drexel		–		3	–	5	–	1
Fordham		–		3	–	5	–	0
Brown		–		3	–	6	–	1
Vermont		–		2	–	6	–	0
Providence		–		1	–	4	–	2
Franklin & Marshall		–		1	–	7	–	1
Lehigh		–		1	–	7	–	1
Rankings from Dickinson System

The 1927 Dartmouth Indians football team was an American football team that represented Dartmouth College as an independent during the 1927 college football season. In their fifth season under head coach Jesse Hawley, the Indians compiled a 7–1 record. Robert MacPhail was the team captain.

Myles Lane was the team's leading scorer, with 125 points, from 18 touchdowns and 17 kicked extra points.

Dartmouth played its home games at Memorial Field on the college campus in Hanover, New Hampshire.

== Schedule ==
Date	Opponent	Site	Result	Attendance	Source
September 24	Norwich	Memorial Field; Hanover, NH	W 47–0		
October 1	Hobart	Memorial Field; Hanover, NH	W 46–0		
October 8	Allegheny	Memorial Field; Hanover, NH	W 38–7		
October 15	Temple	Memorial Field; Hanover, NH	W 47–7		
October 22	at Harvard	Harvard Stadium; Boston, MA (rivalry)	W 30–6	55,000	
October 29	at Yale	Yale Bowl; New Haven, CT	L 0–19	58,000	
November 5	at Brown	Brown Stadium; Providence, RI	W 19–7	20,000	
November 12	Cornell	Memorial Field; Hanover, NH (rivalry)	W 53–7		
