= 1927 Temple Owls football team =

American college football season

1927 Temple Owls football
- Conference: Independent
- Record: 7–1
- Head coach: Heinie Miller (3rd season)
- Captain: Harry J. Jacobs
- Home stadium: Temple Field

1927 Eastern college football independents records
	Conf.			Overall
Team	W	L	T	W		L		T
Tufts		–		8	–	0	–	0
Springfield		–		7	–	0	–	2
Washington & Jefferson		–		7	–	0	–	2
No. 6 Army		–		9	–	1	–	0
No. 2 Pittsburgh		–		8	–	1	–	1
Temple		–		7	–	1	–	0
No. 5 Yale		–		7	–	1	–	0
NYU		–		7	–	1	–	2
Princeton		–		6	–	1	–	0
Villanova		–		6	–	1	–	0
Penn State		–		6	–	2	–	1
Columbia		–		5	–	2	–	2
Bucknell		–		6	–	3	–	1
Colgate		–		4	–	2	–	3
CCNY		–		4	–	2	–	2
Lafayette		–		5	–	3	–	1
Penn		–		6	–	4	–	0
Syracuse		–		5	–	3	–	2
Carnegie Tech		–		5	–	4	–	1
Boston College		–		4	–	4	–	0
Harvard		–		4	–	4	–	0
Rutgers		–		4	–	4	–	0
Cornell		–		3	–	3	–	2
Boston University		–		3	–	4	–	1
Drexel		–		3	–	5	–	1
Fordham		–		3	–	5	–	0
Brown		–		3	–	6	–	1
Vermont		–		2	–	6	–	0
Providence		–		1	–	4	–	2
Franklin & Marshall		–		1	–	7	–	1
Lehigh		–		1	–	7	–	1
Rankings from Dickinson System

The 1927 Temple Owls football team was an American football team that represented Temple University as an independent during the 1927 college football season. In its third season under head coach Heinie Miller, the team compiled a 7–1 record. Fullback Harry J. Jacobs was the team captain.

== Schedule ==
Date	Opponent	Site	Result	Attendance	Source
October 1	Blue Ridge (MD)	Temple Field; Philadelphia, PA	W 110–0		
October 8	Juniata	Temple Field; Philadelphia, PA	W 58–0	3,000	
October 15	at Dartmouth	Memorial Field; Hanover, NH	L 7–47		
October 22	Gallaudet	Temple Field; Philadelphia, PA	W 62–0	6,000	
October 29	at Brown	Brown Stadium; Providence, RI	W 7–0		
November 5	Albright	Temple Field; Philadelphia, PA	W 13–0		
November 12	Washington College	Temple Field; Philadelphia, PA	W 75–0	7,000	
November 19	Bucknell	Franklin Field; Philadelphia, PA	W 19–13	25,000	
