= 1927 Rhode Island State Rams football team =

American college football season

1927 Rhode Island State Rams football
- Conference: New England Conference
- Record: 5–3 (2–1 New England)
- Head coach: Frank Keaney (8th season)

1927 New England Conference football standings
| | Conf. | | | | | Overall |
| Team | W | | L | | T | W | | L | | T |
|---|---|---|---|---|---|---|---|---|---|---|
| Maine $ | 3 | – | 0 | – | 0 | 6 | – | 1 | – | 0 |
| Rhode Island State | 2 | – | 1 | – | 0 | 5 | – | 3 | – | 0 |
| Connecticut | 1 | – | 2 | – | 0 | 5 | – | 4 | – | 0 |
| New Hampshire | 0 | – | 3 | – | 0 | 0 | – | 7 | – | 1 |
| Massachusetts | 0 | – | 0 | – | 0 | 0 | – | 7 | – | 1 |
$ – Conference champion

The 1927 Rhode Island Rams football team was an American football team that represented Rhode Island State College (later renamed the University of Rhode Island) as a member of the New England Conference during the 1927 college football season. In its eighth season under head coach Frank Keaney, the team compiled a 5–3 record (2–1 against conference opponents) and finished in second place in the conference.

== Schedule ==
| Date | Opponent | Site | Result | Source |
|---|---|---|---|---|
| September 24 | at Brown* | Brown Stadium; Providence, RI (rivalry) | L 0–27 | |
| October 1 | at Maine | Alumni Field; Orono, ME | L 0–27 | |
| October 8 | Lowell Textile* | Kingston, RI | W 26–0 | |
| October 15 | at New Hampshire | Memorial Field; Durham, NH | W 20–18 | |
| October 22 | CCNY* | Kingston, RI | L 19–20 | |
| October 29 | at Worcester Tech* | Alumni Stadium; Worcester, MA | W 20–14 | |
| November 5 | Coast Guard* | Kingston, RI | W 14–6 | |
| November 12 | Connecticut^{†} | Kingston, RI (rivalry) | W 12–0 | |
*Non-conference game; ^{†}Homecoming
