= Paul Kuczo =

American football player (1903–1970)

- Paul Kuczo, 1927

Profile
- Position: Quarterback

Personal information
- Born: February 4, 1903; Stamford, Connecticut, U.S.
- Died: December 4, 1970 (aged 67); Stamford, Connecticut, U.S.
- Listed height: 5 ft 9 in (1.75 m)
- Listed weight: 165 lb (75 kg)

Career information
- High school: Stamford (CT)
- College: Villanova

Career history
- Staten Island Stapletons (1929)

Career statistics
- Games: 6

Paul Jams Kuczo (February 4, 1903 – December 4, 1970) was an American football player.

Kuczo was born in Stamford, Connecticut, in 1903. He attended Stamford High School where he played football, baseball (as a pitcher), and basketball (as a guard and forward).

He played college football as the quarterback for Villanova. He was captain of the 1927 Villanova Wildcats football team that compiled a 6–1 record.

He played professional football in the National Football League (NFL) for the Staten Island Stapletons. He appeared in four NFL games, one as a starter, during the 1929 season.

He also played baseball. He was a pitcher for Villanova's baseball team. After graduating from Villanova, he played for Stamford and Bridgeport, Connecticut, in the Eastern League.

After retiring as a player, Kuczo was the football coach at Stamford High School from 1928 to 1968. His teams won Connecticut state championships in 1937, 1950, 1952, and 1953.
