= 1927 Brown Bears football team =

American college football season

1927 Brown Bears football
- Conference: Independent
- Record: 3–6–1
- Head coach: Tuss McLaughry (2nd season)
- Captain: R. E. Randall
- Home stadium: Brown Stadium

1927 Eastern college football independents records
	Conf.			Overall
Team	W	L	T	W		L		T
Tufts		–		8	–	0	–	0
Springfield		–		7	–	0	–	2
Washington & Jefferson		–		7	–	0	–	2
No. 6 Army		–		9	–	1	–	0
No. 2 Pittsburgh		–		8	–	1	–	1
Temple		–		7	–	1	–	0
No. 5 Yale		–		7	–	1	–	0
NYU		–		7	–	1	–	2
Princeton		–		6	–	1	–	0
Villanova		–		6	–	1	–	0
Penn State		–		6	–	2	–	1
Columbia		–		5	–	2	–	2
Bucknell		–		6	–	3	–	1
Colgate		–		4	–	2	–	3
CCNY		–		4	–	2	–	2
Lafayette		–		5	–	3	–	1
Penn		–		6	–	4	–	0
Syracuse		–		5	–	3	–	2
Carnegie Tech		–		5	–	4	–	1
Boston College		–		4	–	4	–	0
Harvard		–		4	–	4	–	0
Rutgers		–		4	–	4	–	0
Cornell		–		3	–	3	–	2
Boston University		–		3	–	4	–	1
Drexel		–		3	–	5	–	1
Fordham		–		3	–	5	–	0
Brown		–		3	–	6	–	1
Vermont		–		2	–	6	–	0
Providence		–		1	–	4	–	2
Franklin & Marshall		–		1	–	7	–	1
Lehigh		–		1	–	7	–	1
Rankings from Dickinson System

The 1927 Brown Bears football team represented Brown University as an independent during the 1927 college football season. Led by second-year head coach Tuss McLaughry, the Bears compiled a record of 3–6–1.

== Schedule ==
Date	Opponent	Site	Result	Attendance	Source
September 24	Rhode Island State	Brown Stadium; Providence, RI (rivalry)	W 17–0		
October 1	Albright	Brown Stadium; Providence, RI	W 20–0		
October 8	at Penn	Franklin Field; Philadelphia, PA	L 6–14		
October 15	at Yale	Yale Bowl; New Haven, CT	L 0–19	40,000	
October 22	Lebanon Valley	Brown Stadium; Providence, RI	L 12–13		
October 29	Temple	Brown Stadium; Providence, RI	L 0–7		
November 5	Dartmouth	Brown Stadium; Providence, RI	L 7–10	20,000	
November 12	at Harvard	Harvard Stadium; Boston, MA	L 6–18		
November 19	New Hampshire	Brown Stadium; Providence, RI	W 31–13		
November 26	Colgate	Brown Stadium; Providence, RI	T 0–0		
