= 1927 Connecticut Aggies football team =

American college football season

1927 Connecticut Aggies football
- Conference: New England Conference
- Record: 5–4 (1–2 New England)
- Head coach: Sumner Dole (5th season)
- Home stadium: Gardner Dow Athletic Fields

1927 New England Conference football standings
	Conf.					Overall
Team	W		L		T	W		L		T
Maine $	3	–	0	–	0	6	–	1	–	0
Rhode Island State	2	–	1	–	0	5	–	3	–	0
Connecticut	1	–	2	–	0	5	–	4	–	0
New Hampshire	0	–	3	–	0	0	–	7	–	1
Massachusetts	0	–	0	–	0	0	–	7	–	1
$ – Conference champion

The 1927 Connecticut Aggies football team represented Connecticut Agricultural College, now the University of Connecticut, in the 1927 college football season. The Aggies were led by fifth-year head coach Sumner Dole, and completed the season with a record of 5–4.

== Schedule ==
Date	Opponent	Site	Result	Attendance	Source
September 24	Coast Guard*	Gardner Dow Athletic Fields; Storrs, CT	W 38–0		
October 1	at Wesleyan*	Andrus Field; Middletown, CT	W 19–0		
October 8	Maine	Gardner Dow Athletic Fields; Storrs, CT	L 13–14		
October 15	at Springfield*	Pratt Field; Springfield, MA	L 21–31	5,000	
October 22	vs. New Hampshire	Textile Field; Manchester, NH	W 9–6		
October 29	at Lowell Textile*	Lowell, MA	W 28–6		
November 5	at Trinity (CT)*	Trinity Field; Hartford, CT	W 25–12		
November 12	at Rhode Island State*	Kingston, RI (rivalry)	L 0–12		
November 19	Boston College*	Gardner Dow Athletic Fields; Storrs, CT	L 0–19		
*Non-conference game
