= 1927 Massachusetts Aggies football team =

American college football season

1927 Massachusetts Aggies football
- Conference: New England Conference
- Record: 0–7–1 (0–0 New England)
- Head coach: Harold Gore (9th season)
- Home stadium: Alumni Field

1927 New England Conference football standings
	Conf.					Overall
Team	W		L		T	W		L		T
Maine $	3	–	0	–	0	6	–	1	–	0
Rhode Island State	2	–	1	–	0	5	–	3	–	0
Connecticut	1	–	2	–	0	5	–	4	–	0
New Hampshire	0	–	3	–	0	0	–	7	–	1
Massachusetts	0	–	0	–	0	0	–	7	–	1
$ – Conference champion

The 1927 Massachusetts Aggies football team represented Massachusetts Agricultural College in the 1927 college football season. The team was a member of the New England Conference, although they did not play other teams in the conference this season. The team was coached by Harold Gore and played its home games at Alumni Field in Amherst, Massachusetts. The 1927 season was Gore's last with the Aggies, as he finished his coaching career with a record of 33–32–5. It was also their most recent winless season. Massachusetts finished the season with a record of 0–7–1.

== Schedule ==
Date	Opponent	Site	Result	Attendance	Source
September 24	Bowdoin	Alumni Field; Amherst, MA	T 0–0		
October 1	at Bates	Garcelon Field; Lewiston, ME	L 0–7		
October 8	at Middlebury	Middlebury, VT	L 0–12		
October 15	at Williams	Weston Field; Williamstown, MA	L 7–31		
October 22	at Worcester Tech	Alumni Field; Worcester, MA	L 0–7		
October 29	at Amherst	Pratt Field; Amherst, MA	L 0–20		
November 5	at Springfield	Pratt Field; Springfield, MA	L 0–26	4,000	
November 19	Tufts	Alumni Field; Amherst, MA	L 6–32		
