= 1927 Maine Black Bears football team =

American college football season

1927 Maine Black Bears football

New England champion
- Conference: New England Conference, Maine Intercollegiate Athletic Association
- Record: 6–1 (3–0 New England, 2–1 MIAA)
- Head coach: Fred Brice (7th season)
- Home stadium: Alumni Field

1927 New England Conference football standings
	Conf.					Overall
Team	W		L		T	W		L		T
Maine $	3	–	0	–	0	6	–	1	–	0
Rhode Island State	2	–	1	–	0	5	–	3	–	0
Connecticut	1	–	2	–	0	5	–	4	–	0
New Hampshire	0	–	3	–	0	0	–	7	–	1
Massachusetts	0	–	0	–	0	0	–	7	–	1
$ – Conference champion

The 1927 Maine Black Bears football team was an American football team that represented the University of Maine as a member of the New England Conference and Maine Intercollegiate Athletic Association during the 1927 college football season. In its seventh season under head coach Fred Brice, the team compiled a 6–1 record (3–0 against New England and 2–1 against MIAA conference opponents) and won the New England conference championship. The team played its home games at Alumni Field in Orono, Maine. Moses Nanigan was the team captain.

== Schedule ==
Date	Opponent	Site	Result	Source
October 1	Rhode Island State	Alumni Field; Orono, ME	W 27–0	
October 8	at Connecticut	Gardner Dow Athletic Fields; Storrs, CT	W 14–3	
October 15	Fort Williams*	Alumni Field; Orono, ME	W 97–0	
October 22	at Bates	Garcelon Field; Lewiston, ME	W 67–0	
October 29	at Colby	Seaverns Field; Waterville, ME	L 0–17	
November 5	Bowdoin	Alumni Field; Orono, ME	W 27–0	
November 12	New Hampshire	Alumni Field; Orono, ME (rivalry)	W 13–6	
*Non-conference game
