= 1927 New Hampshire Wildcats football team =

American college football season

1927 New Hampshire Wildcats football
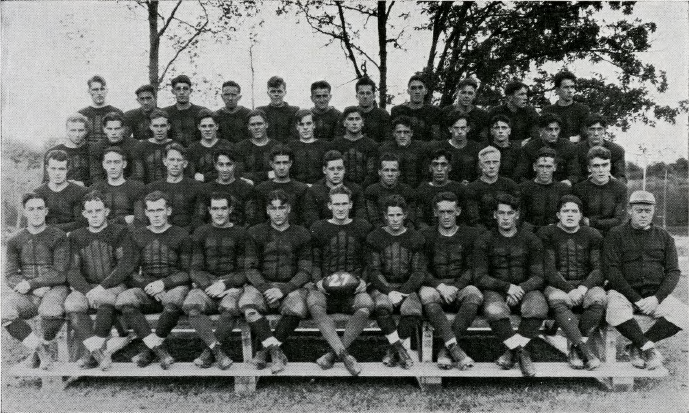
- Conference: New England Conference
- Record: 0–7–1 (0–3 New England)
- Head coach: Butch Cowell (12th season)
- Captain: William Dane
- Home stadium: Memorial Field

1927 New England Conference football standings
	Conf.					Overall
Team	W		L		T	W		L		T
Maine $	3	–	0	–	0	6	–	1	–	0
Rhode Island State	2	–	1	–	0	5	–	3	–	0
Connecticut	1	–	2	–	0	5	–	4	–	0
New Hampshire	0	–	3	–	0	0	–	7	–	1
Massachusetts	0	–	0	–	0	0	–	7	–	1
$ – Conference champion

The 1927 New Hampshire Wildcats football team was an American football team that represented the University of New Hampshire as a member of the New England Conference during the 1927 college football season. In its 12th season under head coach William "Butch" Cowell, (Note: This was Cowell's 13th year and 12th season as head coach, as the school did not field a team in 1918 due to World War I.) the team compiled an 0–7–1 record, and were outscored by their opponents, 134–50. After starting the season with a scoreless tie, the team lost each of their seven remaining contests. The team played its home games in Durham, New Hampshire, at Memorial Field. (Note: Memorial Field remains in use by the New Hampshire women's field hockey team.)

== Schedule ==
Date	Time	Opponent	Site	Result	Attendance	Source
October 1		at Colby*	Waterville, ME	T 0–0		
October 8		Bowdoin*	Memorial Field; Durham, NH	L 7–12		
October 15		Rhode Island State	Memorial Field; Durham, NH	L 18–20		
October 22		vs. Connecticut^{†}	Textile Field; Manchester, NH	L 6–9		
October 29		Springfield*	Memorial Field; Durham, NH	L 0–10		
November 5	2:00 p.m.	Tufts*^{†}	Memorial Field; Durham, NH	L 0–39		
November 12		at Maine	Alumni Field; Orono, ME (rivalry)	L 6–13		
November 19		at Brown*	Brown Stadium; Providence, RI	L 13–31		
*Non-conference game; ^{†}Homecoming; All times are in Eastern time; Source:

The 1927 game remains the last time that the Bowdoin and New Hampshire football programs have met.
