= 1927 Columbia Lions football team =

American college football season

1927 Columbia Lions football
- Conference: Independent
- Record: 5–2–2
- Head coach: Charles Crowley (3rd season)
- Home stadium: Baker Field, Polo Grounds

1927 Eastern college football independents records
	Conf.			Overall
Team	W	L	T	W		L		T
Tufts		–		8	–	0	–	0
Springfield		–		7	–	0	–	2
Washington & Jefferson		–		7	–	0	–	2
No. 6 Army		–		9	–	1	–	0
No. 2 Pittsburgh		–		8	–	1	–	1
Temple		–		7	–	1	–	0
No. 5 Yale		–		7	–	1	–	0
NYU		–		7	–	1	–	2
Princeton		–		6	–	1	–	0
Villanova		–		6	–	1	–	0
Penn State		–		6	–	2	–	1
Columbia		–		5	–	2	–	2
Bucknell		–		6	–	3	–	1
Colgate		–		4	–	2	–	3
CCNY		–		4	–	2	–	2
Lafayette		–		5	–	3	–	1
Penn		–		6	–	4	–	0
Syracuse		–		5	–	3	–	2
Carnegie Tech		–		5	–	4	–	1
Boston College		–		4	–	4	–	0
Harvard		–		4	–	4	–	0
Rutgers		–		4	–	4	–	0
Cornell		–		3	–	3	–	2
Boston University		–		3	–	4	–	1
Drexel		–		3	–	5	–	1
Fordham		–		3	–	5	–	0
Brown		–		3	–	6	–	1
Vermont		–		2	–	6	–	0
Providence		–		1	–	4	–	2
Franklin & Marshall		–		1	–	7	–	1
Lehigh		–		1	–	7	–	1
Rankings from Dickinson System

The 1927 Columbia Lions football team was an American football team that represented Columbia University as an independent during the 1927 college football season. In its third season under head coach Charles Crowley, the team compiled a 5–2–2 record and outscored opponents 135 to 54, with five shutouts. The team played home games at Baker Field and the Polo Grounds in Upper Manhattan.

== Schedule ==
Date	Time	Opponent	Site	Result	Attendance	Source
September 24		Vermont	Baker Field; New York, NY	W 32–0		
October 1		Union (NY)	Baker Field; New York, NY	W 28–0		
October 8		Wesleyan	Baker Field; New York, NY	W 28–0		
October 15		Colgate	Baker Field; New York, NY	L 7–13		
October 22		Williams	Baker Field; New York, NY	W 19–0		
October 29		at Cornell	Schoellkopf Field; Ithaca, NY (rivalry)	T 0–0		
November 5		Johns Hopkins	Baker Field; New York, NY	T 7–7		
November 12		at Penn	Franklin Field; Philadelphia, PA	L 0–27		
November 24	2:00 p.m.	Syracuse	Polo Grounds; New York, NY	W 14–7	35,000	
