= 1927 Springfield Red and White football team =

American college football season

1927 Springfield Red and White football
- Conference: Independent
- Record: 7–0–2
- Head coach: John L. Rothacher (4th season)
- Captain: Chester A. Bollier
- Home stadium: Pratt Field

1927 Eastern college football independents records
	Conf.			Overall
Team	W	L	T	W		L		T
Tufts		–		8	–	0	–	0
Springfield		–		7	–	0	–	2
Washington & Jefferson		–		7	–	0	–	2
No. 6 Army		–		9	–	1	–	0
No. 2 Pittsburgh		–		8	–	1	–	1
Temple		–		7	–	1	–	0
No. 5 Yale		–		7	–	1	–	0
NYU		–		7	–	1	–	2
Princeton		–		6	–	1	–	0
Villanova		–		6	–	1	–	0
Penn State		–		6	–	2	–	1
Columbia		–		5	–	2	–	2
Bucknell		–		6	–	3	–	1
Colgate		–		4	–	2	–	3
CCNY		–		4	–	2	–	2
Lafayette		–		5	–	3	–	1
Penn		–		6	–	4	–	0
Syracuse		–		5	–	3	–	2
Carnegie Tech		–		5	–	4	–	1
Boston College		–		4	–	4	–	0
Harvard		–		4	–	4	–	0
Rutgers		–		4	–	4	–	0
Cornell		–		3	–	3	–	2
Boston University		–		3	–	4	–	1
Drexel		–		3	–	5	–	1
Fordham		–		3	–	5	–	0
Brown		–		3	–	6	–	1
Vermont		–		2	–	6	–	0
Providence		–		1	–	4	–	2
Franklin & Marshall		–		1	–	7	–	1
Lehigh		–		1	–	7	–	1
Rankings from Dickinson System

The 1927 Springfield Red and White football team was an American football team that represented Springfield College as an independent during the 1927 college football season. Led by fourth-year head coach John L. Rothacher, Springfield compiled a record of 7–0–2.

== Schedule ==
Date	Opponent	Site	Result	Attendance	Source
September 24	Cooper Union	Pratt Field; Springfield, MA	W 63–0		
October 1	Providence College	Pratt Field; Springfield, MA	T 0–0		
October 8	at Union (NY)	Alexander Field; Schenectady, NY	T 7–7		
October 15	Connecticut	Pratt Field; Springfield, MA	W 31–21	5,000	
October 22	Boston University	Pratt Field; Springfield, MA	W 9–6	5,500	
October 29	at New Hampshire	Memorial Field; Durham, NH	W 10–0		
November 5	Massachusetts	Pratt Field; Springfield, MA	W 26–0	4,000	
November 12	RPI	Pratt Field; Springfield, MA	W 26–0		
November 24	Vermont	Pratt Field; Springfield, MA	W 24–0		
