= 1927 Pittsburgh Panthers football team =

American college football season

1927 Pittsburgh Panthers football
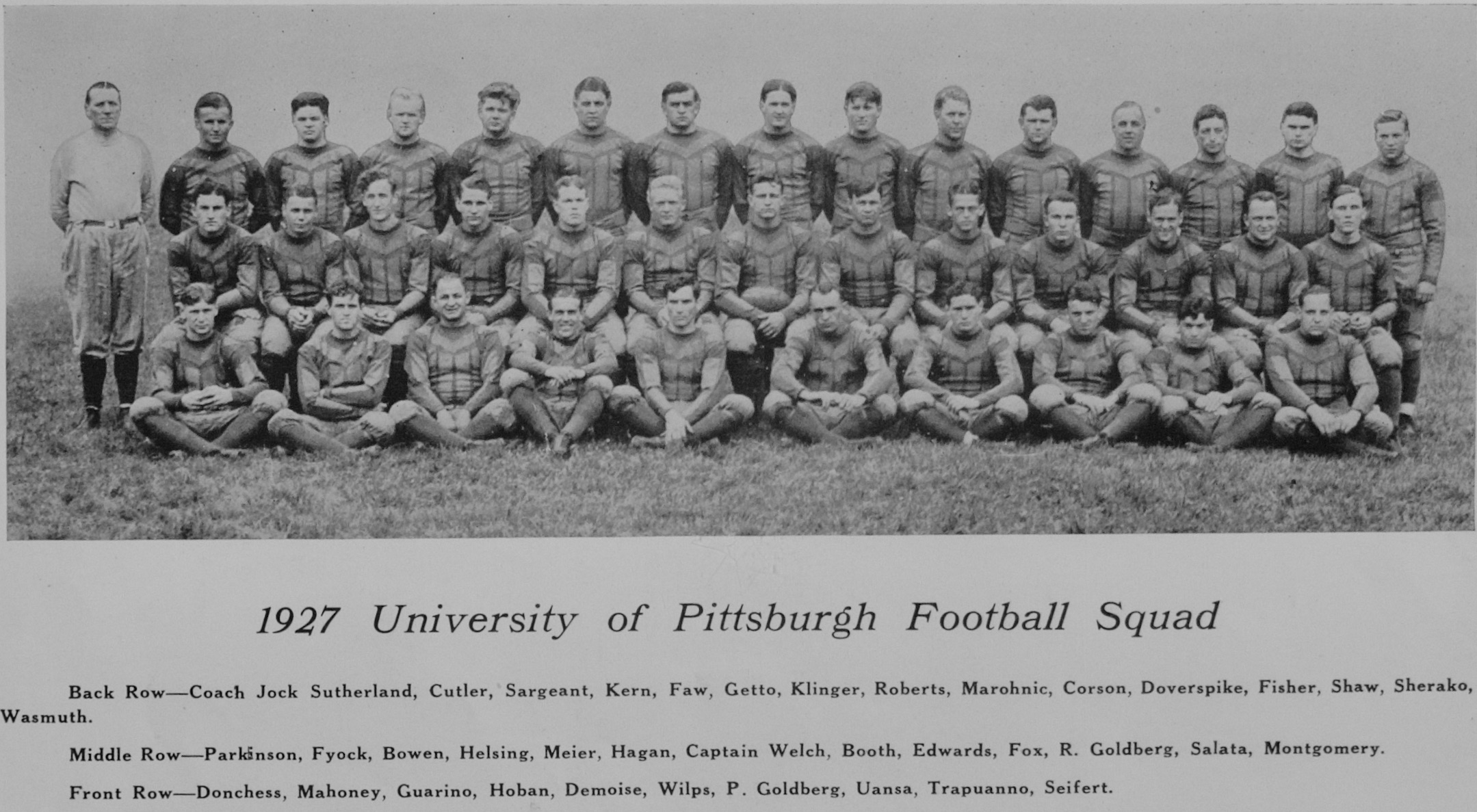

Rose Bowl, L 6–7 vs. Stanford
- Conference: Independent
- Record: 8–1–1
- Head coach: Jock Sutherland (4th season)
- Offensive scheme: Single-wing
- Captain: Gibby Welch
- Home stadium: Pitt Stadium

1927 Eastern college football independents records
	Conf.			Overall
Team	W	L	T	W		L		T
Tufts		–		8	–	0	–	0
Springfield		–		7	–	0	–	2
Washington & Jefferson		–		7	–	0	–	2
No. 6 Army		–		9	–	1	–	0
No. 2 Pittsburgh		–		8	–	1	–	1
Temple		–		7	–	1	–	0
No. 5 Yale		–		7	–	1	–	0
NYU		–		7	–	1	–	2
Princeton		–		6	–	1	–	0
Villanova		–		6	–	1	–	0
Penn State		–		6	–	2	–	1
Columbia		–		5	–	2	–	2
Bucknell		–		6	–	3	–	1
Colgate		–		4	–	2	–	3
CCNY		–		4	–	2	–	2
Lafayette		–		5	–	3	–	1
Penn		–		6	–	4	–	0
Syracuse		–		5	–	3	–	2
Carnegie Tech		–		5	–	4	–	1
Boston College		–		4	–	4	–	0
Harvard		–		4	–	4	–	0
Rutgers		–		4	–	4	–	0
Cornell		–		3	–	3	–	2
Boston University		–		3	–	4	–	1
Drexel		–		3	–	5	–	1
Fordham		–		3	–	5	–	0
Brown		–		3	–	6	–	1
Vermont		–		2	–	6	–	0
Providence		–		1	–	4	–	2
Franklin & Marshall		–		1	–	7	–	1
Lehigh		–		1	–	7	–	1
Rankings from Dickinson System

The 1927 Pittsburgh Panthers football team was an American football team that represented the University of Pittsburgh as an independent during the 1927 college football season. In its fourth season under head coach Jock Sutherland, the team compiled an 8–1–1 record, shut out seven of its ten opponents, suffered it sole loss to Stanford by a 7–6 score in the 1928 Rose Bowl, and outscored all opponents by a total of 285 to 27. The team played its eight home games at Pitt Stadium in Pittsburgh. Pitt sports fans were treated to a superb 1927-28 athletic program as four Panther teams finished their seasons undefeated - football, basketball, track and swimming. The team was ranked No. 2 in the nation in the Dickinson System ratings released in December 1927.

== Schedule ==
Date	Opponent	Site	Result	Attendance	Source
September 24	Thiel	Pitt Stadium; Pittsburgh, PA	W 48–0	4,000–10,000	
October 1	Grove City	Pitt Stadium; Pittsburgh, PA	W 33–0	6,000	
October 8	West Virginia	Pitt Stadium; Pittsburgh, PA (rivalry)	W 40–0	18,000−20,000	
October 15	at Drake	Drake Stadium; Des Moines, IA	W 32–0	7,000	
October 22	Carnegie Tech	Pitt Stadium; Pittsburgh, PA	W 23–7	58,000–60,000	
October 29	Allegheny	Pitt Stadium; Pittsburgh, PA	W 52–0	5,000–8,000	
November 5	Washington & Jefferson	Pitt Stadium; Pittsburgh, PA	T 0–0	50,000–52,000	
November 12	Nebraska	Pitt Stadium; Pittsburgh, PA	W 21–13	30,000–35,000	
November 24	Penn State	Pitt Stadium; Pittsburgh, PA (rivalry)	W 30–0	57,051–60,000	
December 10	Alumni (exhibition)	Pitt Stadium; Pittsburgh, PA	W 2–0	7,000	
January 2, 1928	vs. Stanford	Rose Bowl; Pasadena, CA (Rose Bowl)	L 6–7	58,000–65,000	

== Preseason ==
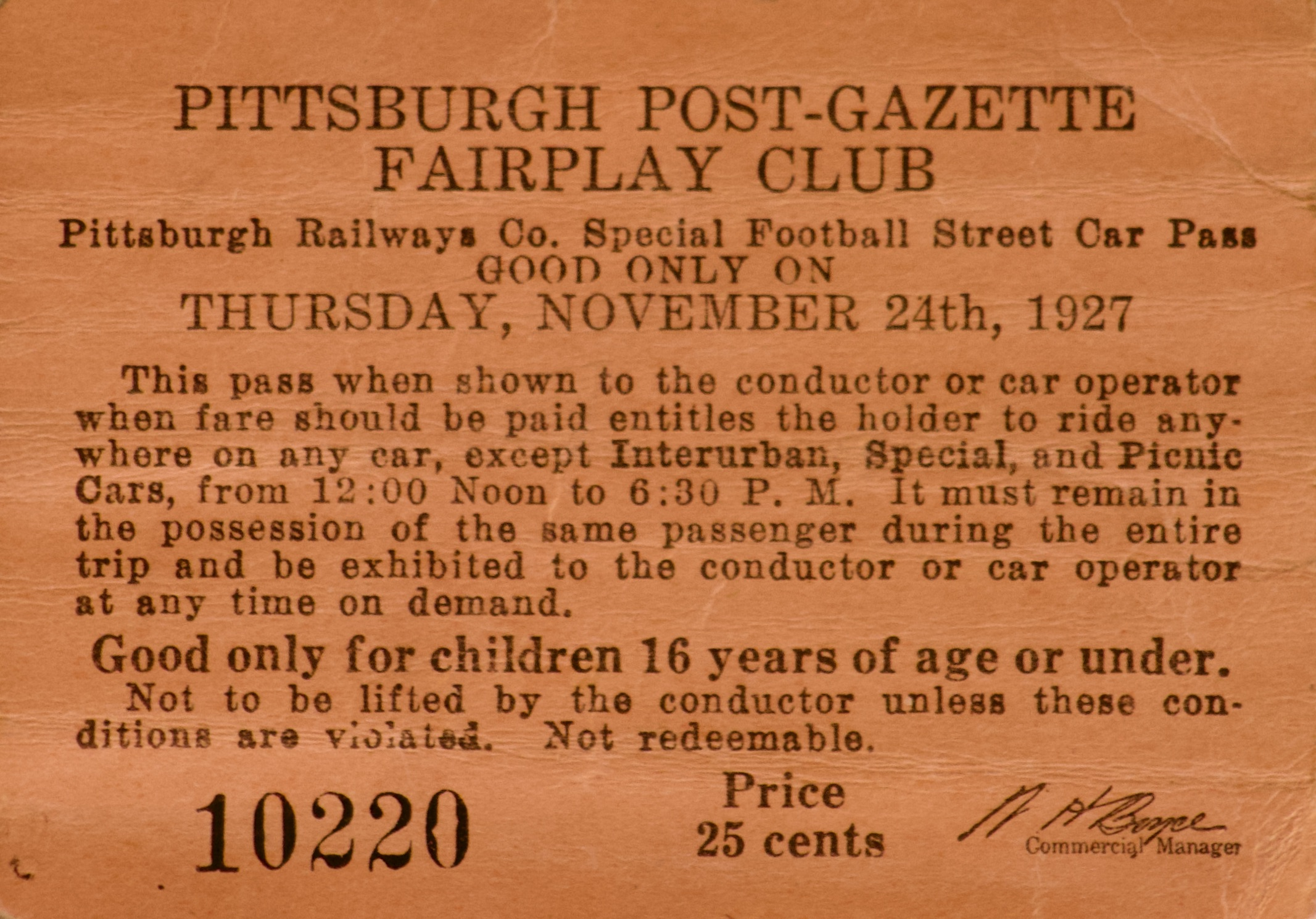
Child's ticket for Pitt vs. Penn State Thanksgiving Day game November 24, 1927

At the annual postseason football banquet, the lettermen voted Gilbert "Gibby" Welch captain for the 1927 season by a 10–9 margin over Andrew Cutler.

William McKee, a junior in the School of Business Administration was appointed varsity football manager for the 1927 team by Karl E. Davis, Graduate Manager of Athletics.

Alfred Hamilton, "Father of Pitt stadium" and alumnus, who was prominent in all Pitt activities, especially sports, died on March 28, 1927. The Pittsburgh Press lamented his passing: "Pittsburgh lost one of its most prominent and best known sportsmen when A. R. Hamilton passed away this morning. He was especially interested in college athletics, having been an alumnus, trustee and member of the Athletic Council of the University of Pittsburgh. In fact many years ago, when Pitt, then the Western University of Pennsylvania, was struggling to gain an athletic foothold, it was Mr. Hamilton's influence and financial aid that smoothed the pathway. He was a great lover of football and never missed a game which the Panthers played. He was a prime mover in the erection of the Pitt stadium and served on the stadium committee."

E. F. Blakeslee was named Athletic Director and former Pitt player Harold Williams was named Assistant Athletic Director by Chancellor John G. Bowman on March 28, 1927. "Dr. Bowman's plan, it is said, is to have the new men work in conjunction with the office of Graduate Manager K. E. Davis, and the new regime will give Pitt an organization akin to those in vogue in the Western conference."

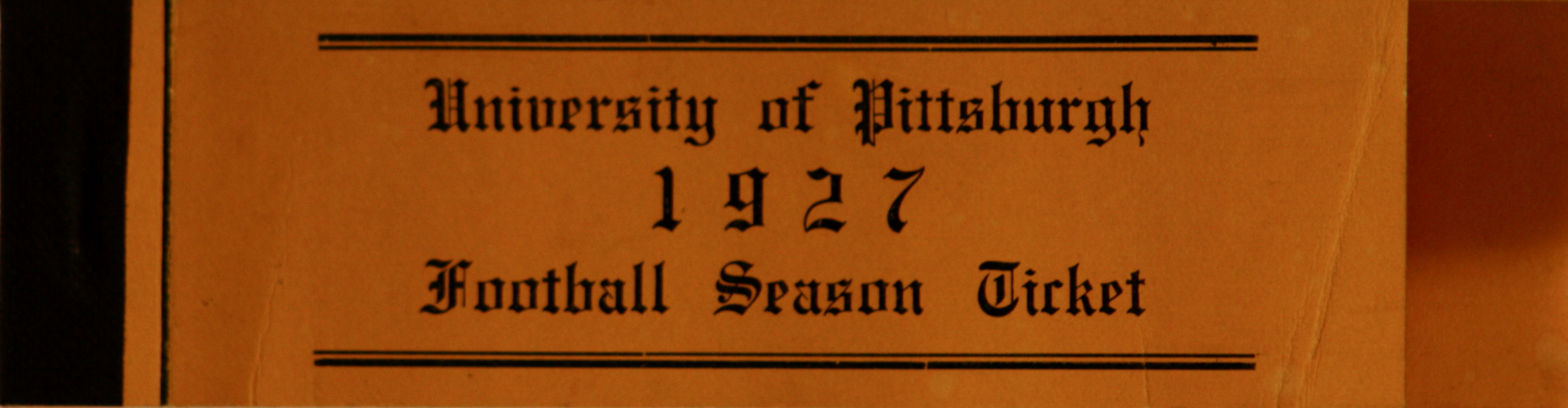
1927 Season Ticket Booklet

The athletic department sold 1927 football season ticket booklets to alumni, bondholders, faculty members and student family members for the first time. Children under 16 could join the Pittsburgh Post-Gazette Fair Play Club and get a 25 cent ticket that was good for a ride on the trolley to the game, entrance to the game and then a ride home on the trolley after the game.(see photo)

Charley Bowser, who coached Grove City to a 7–0 record in 1926, joined Jock Sutherland's staff as an assistant coach to replace Guy Williamson. Williamson resigned to devote more time to his private business. Coach Sutherland completed his staff by hiring two more former Panthers, Roscoe "Skip" Gougler and Zoner Wissinger, to assist with the freshmen team.

Coaches Sutherland, Bowser and Stevenson welcomed more than 60 eager lads to spring practice, held from March 28 to April 23. Drills were run late in the afternoon to not interfere with classes. The emphasis was on fundamentals with scrimmages occurring in the final days of the schedule. The usually stoic coach Sutherland commented to The Pitt Weekly: "I have never had a more aggressive and spirited bunch in training than this. I am more than satisfied that if the boys carry on like this next fall we'll all have reason to be proud of them at the end of the season."

Forty aspirants boarded the train to Windber, Pennsylvania on September 4 for a 14-day preseason training session at Camp Hamilton. "The fresh mountain air, the excellent food served up by the famous Alex Williams, and the complete athletic equipment of the camp all provided a real football atmosphere which aided the coaches in conditioning the fellows. Two snappy scrimmages, three hearty meals, one long restful sleep, and a rules quiz constituted the daily routine of the huskies." The Pittsburgh Post-Gazette noted: "The camp this year has been one of the most successful ever held. Coach Sutherland has his men in fine physical condition and intensive work has put the squad in an advanced stage of training."

== Coaching staff ==
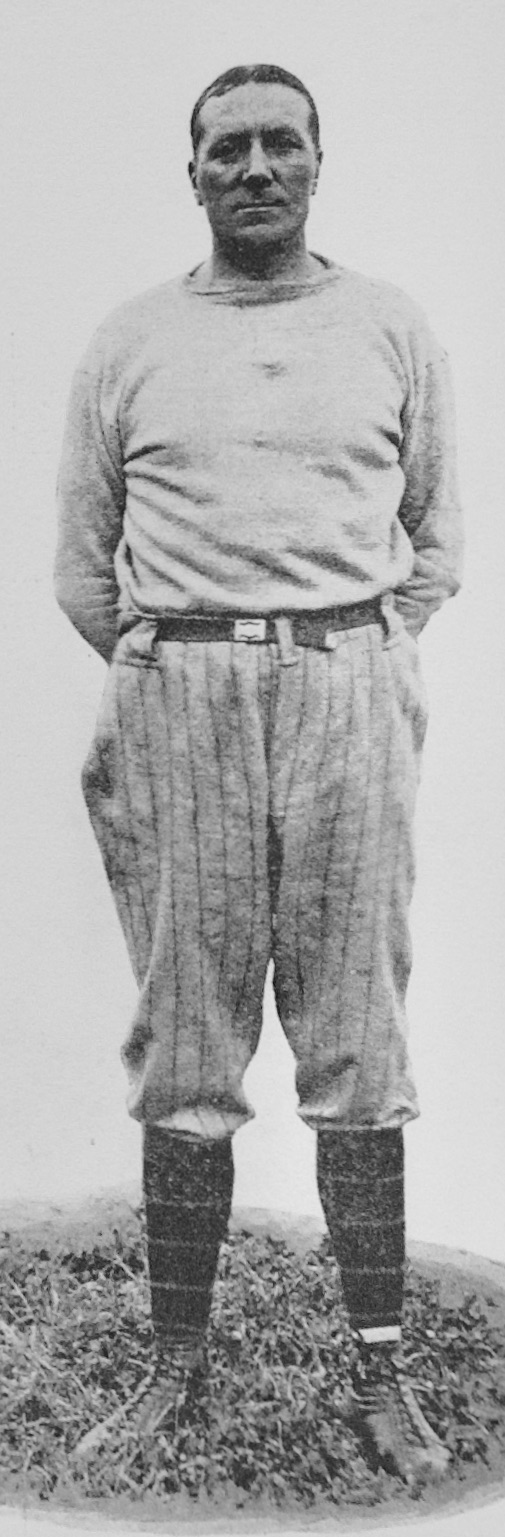
Coach Sutherland

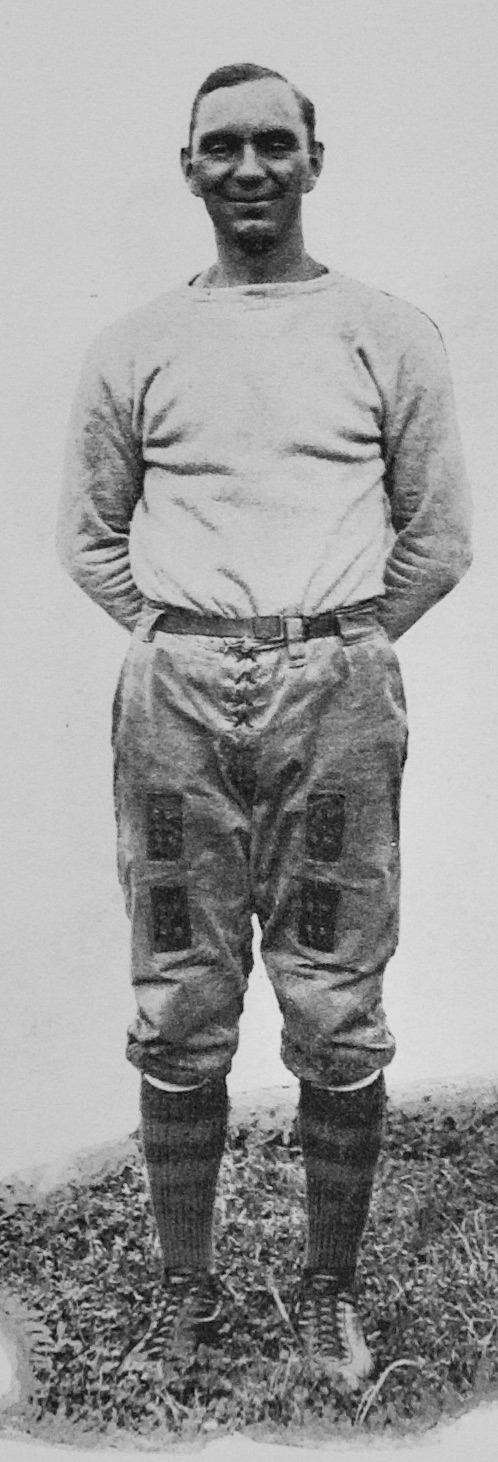
Charley Bowser

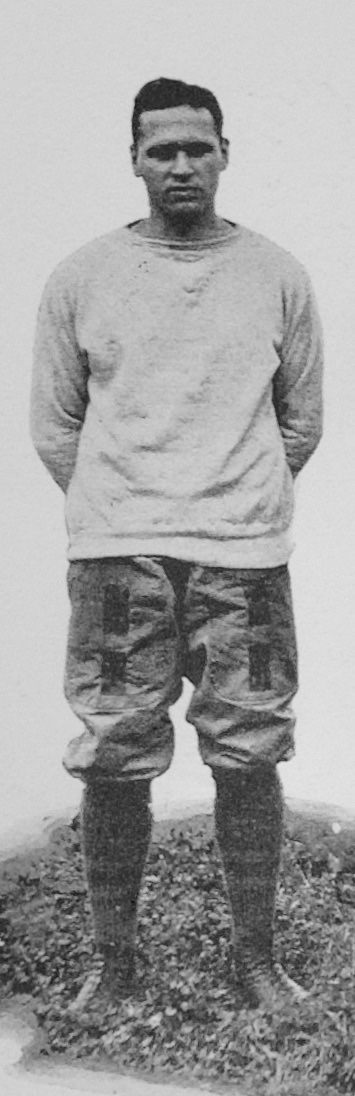
Paul Templeton

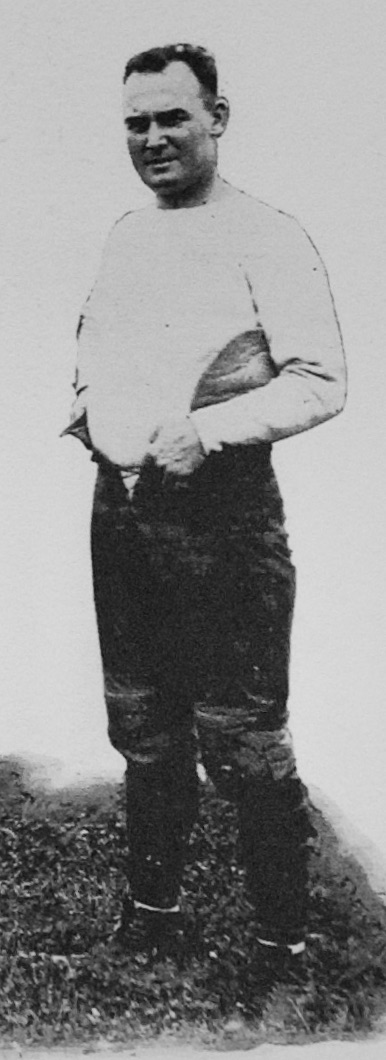
H. Clifford Carlson

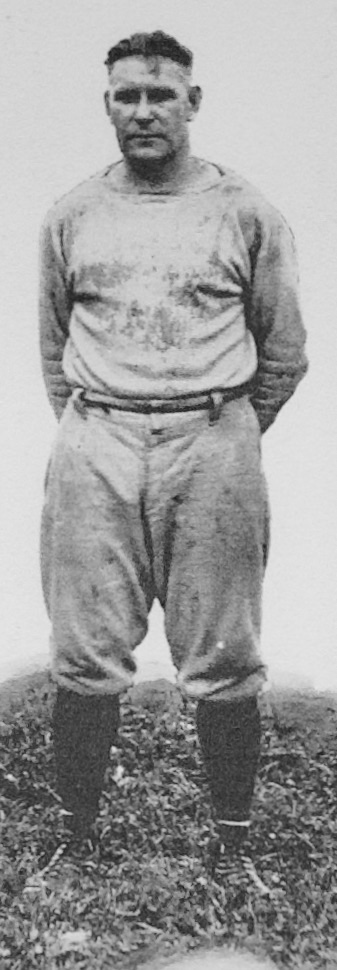
Skip Gougler

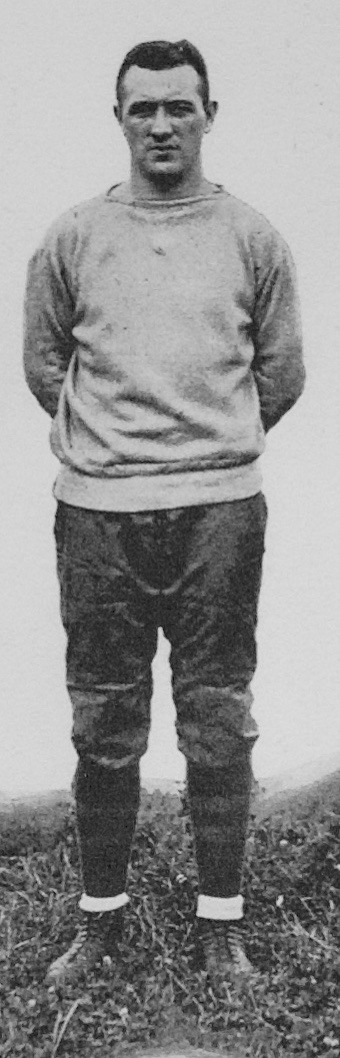
Zoner Wissinger

1927 Pittsburgh Panthers football staff
Coaching staff: John B. "Jock" Sutherland – Head coach; Charley Bowser – Assistant coach; Paul Templeton – part-time assistant coach; Alexander Stevenson – Assistant coach - scout; H. Clifford Carlson – Freshman coach; Roscoe "Skip" Gougler – assistant freshman coach; Zoner Wissinger – assistant freshmen coach	Support staff: William McKee – student football manager; Thomas R. Kendrick – team physician; Ollie DeVictor – team trainer; E. F. Blakeslee - director of athletics; Karl E. Davis – graduate manager of athletics

== Roster ==
1927 Pittsburgh Panthers football roster
Player	Position	Games	Height	Weight	Class	School	Prep School	Hometown
Gilbert L. Welch*	halfback	9	5' 10"	169	1928	Business Adm.	Bellefonte Academy	Parkersburg, W. Va.
Andrew J. Salata*	tackle	8	5' 11"	192	1928	Dental	Wyoming Seminary	Youngstown, Pa.
Philip Goldberg	end	2	5' 9"	154	1929	College	New Kensington H. S.	New Kensington, Pa.
Alexander Fox*	tackle	10	5' 10"	174	1929	Business Adm.	New Castle H. S.	New Castle, Pa.
Chester D. Doverspike	tackle	6	6'	193	1928	Business Adm.	New Bethlehem H. S.	New Bethlehem, Pa.
Allan A. Booth*	fullback	9	5' 8"	180	1928	Dental	Sharon H. S.	Sharon, Pa.
Chester H. Wasmuth*	tackle	10	5' 11"	190	1928	Dental	Union H. S.	Turtle Creek, Pa.
Mike Getto*	tackle	8	6' 2"	194	1929	Business Adm.	Jeannette H. S.	Jeannette, Pa.
Richard Goldberg*	center	7	6'	187	1928	Dental	Slippery Rock Normal	New Kensington, Pa.
Andrew A. Cutler*	center	9	6'	192	1928	Dental	Bellefonte Academy	Fredericktown, Pa.
John A. Roberts*	guard	9	6' 2"	178	1928	College	Parkersburg H. S.	Parkersburg, W. Va.
Felix F. Demoise*	end	9	5' 9"	154	1928	Dental	Greensburg H. S.	Greensburg, Pa.
Reginald Bowen	halfback	1	6'	154	1928	Business Adm.	Erie East H. S.	Erie, Pa.
Philip Sargeant*	end	6	6'	173	1928	Dental	New Castle H. S.	New Castle, Pa.
William Kern*	tackle	9	6'	178	1928	Business Adm.	Wyoming Seminary	Kingston, Pa.
Walter Hoban*	halfback	5	5' 9"	145	1928	Dental	Sharpsville H. S.	Sharpsville, Pa.
Paul R. Fisher*	guard	7	6'	185	1928	English	Avalon H. S.	Ben Avon, Pa.
Dwight W. Fyock*	fullback	5	5' 11"	166	1928	Business Adm.	Johnstown H. S.	Johnstown, Pa.
Albert Guarino*	end	9	5' 8"	170	1929	College	Bellefonte Academy	Greensburg, Pa.
James Hagan*	halfback	9	5' 10"	167	1928	Business Adm.	Windber H. S.	Windber, Pa.
Edward Seifert	guard	2	6'	210	1928	Business Adm.	Schenley H. S.	Pittsburgh, Pa.
Theodore Meier	tackle	0	5' 10"	193	1929	Business Adm.	East Erie H. S.	Erie, Pa.
Theodore Helsing	end	1	5' 11"	168	1930	Civil Engineering	Wilkinsburg H. S.	Wilkinsburg, Pa.
Edward Sherako	end	2	6'	169	1929	Business Adm.	Wyoming Seminary	Plymouth, Pa.
Charles Edwards*	halfback	7	5' 11"	168	1930	Bachelor of Science	Wyoming Seminary	Moundsville, W. Va.
Octavius Uansa*	halfback	5	5' 9"	167	1930	College	McKees Rocks H. S.	McKees Rocks, Pa.
Joe Donchess*	end	7	6'	166	1930	Medical School	Wyoming Seminary	Youngstown, O.
Tom Parkinson*	halfback	8	5' 11"	191	1931	Dental School	California H. S.	California, Pa.
Jack Shaw	center	3	5' 11"	183	1930	College	Rayen H. S.	Youngstown, O.
Ray Montgomery*	guard	10	6'	181	1930	School of Business	Warwood H. S.	Wheeling, W. Va.
R. Felix Wilps	halfback	3	5' 9"	158	1930	Civil Engineering	Norwin H. S.	Irwin, Pa.
Arthur L. Corson	tackle	1	6'	189	1930	Business Adm.	Wyoming Seminary	New Albany, Pa.
Lester Cohen	end	2	6'	180	1930	Business Adm.	Uniontown H. S.	Uniontown, Pa.
William McKee*	manager				1928	Business Adm.	Sisterville H. S.	Sisterville, W. Va.
* Letterman

== Game summaries ==
=== Thiel ===
Week 1: Thiel at Pitt

Team	1	2	3	4	Total
Thiel	0	0	0	0	0
• Pitt	7	13	14	14	48

- Date: September 24, 1927
- Location: Pitt Stadium
  Pittsburgh, PA
- Game start: 2:30 p.m.
- Game attendance: 4,000 – 10,000
- Game weather: sunny
- Referee: Hugh Lambie (Westminster)

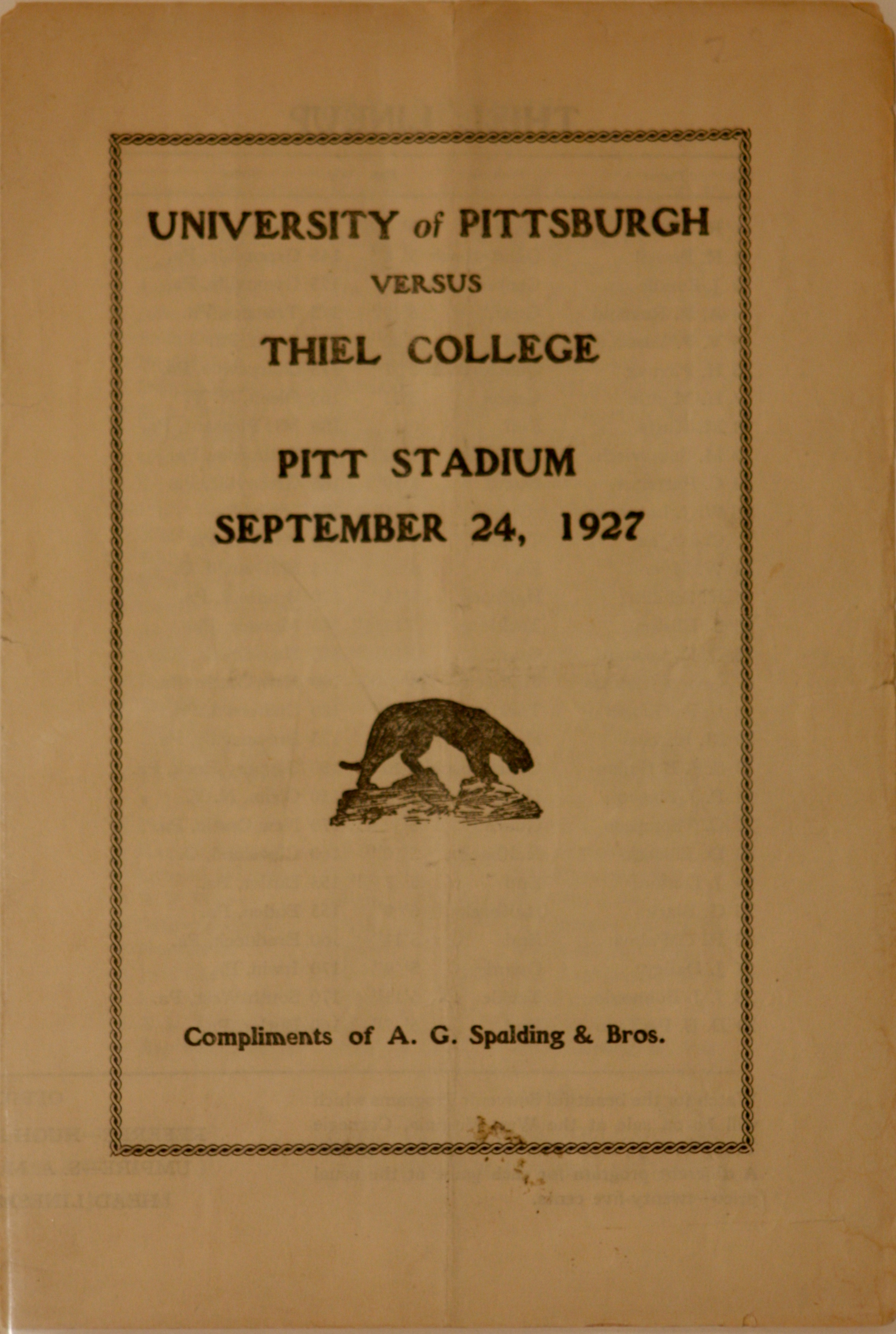
Roster sheet for September 24, 1927 game vs. Thiel

The Panthers opened the season against Thiel College from Greenville, PA. The teams last met in 1900 and 1901 when Pitt was the Western University of Pennsylvania. Pitt led the series 2–0 and had out-scored Thiel 64–0. Former Pitt quarterback, Tom Holleran, was in his fifth year at the helm of the Thiel eleven. Holleran led the team to a 3–6 record in 1926 and had an overall mark of 16–18–2.

The Pitt Weekly boasted: "Making Thiel's gridiron team look like a fly in the palm of the stadium saucer the Golden Jerseyed edition of Pitt football rang up its opening victory of the season last Saturday at the stadium when it walloped Tommy Holleran's warriors by the decisive score of 48–0. A crowd of nearly 5,000 witnessed the walkaway despite the fact that the Pirates drew over 25,000 sport fans to Forbes Field."

Pitt dominated offensively and defensively. Fullback Allan "Dick" Booth led the scoring with 3 touchdowns followed by captain Gilbert "Gibby" Welch with 2. James Hagan and Tom Parkinson each added one. Booth was successful on 4 of 5 placements and Charles Edwards drop-kicked both his attempts through the uprights to close out the scoring. Pitt amassed 407 rushing yards and another 100 yards through the air on 6 pass completions. Thiel registered a first down after two offensive plays but the Pitt defense stiffened and did not surrender another. Thiel finished the season with a 1–7–1 record.

Coach Sutherland was not pleased: "The play of the Panthers yesterday against Thiel was just fair. Coach Holleran has a green, but fighting team. I was confident of a victory yesterday, but I am rather disappointed in the performance of some of my men. Using straight football tactics as they were instructed before the game my offense functioned fairly well. The defensive work was rather disappointing, however, and I shall stress that phase of the game in practice this week. I thought I had given my men sufficient work on the fundamentals, but I was dissatisfied with the blocking yesterday. The interference was ragged most of the time. Another disappointing feature was the play of my reserves. They did not work satisfactorily, as a team or individually. On the whole, however, I suppose the showing of my team was satisfactory enough for the first game of the season. I am confident that I shall have just a good football team, a team that will play a steady ordinary brand of football."

The Pitt starting lineup for the game against Thiel was Felix Demoise (left end), William Kern (left tackle), John Roberts (left guard), Andrew Cutler (center), Alex Fox (right guard), Chester Wasmuth (right tackle), Albert Guarino (right end), Paul Fisher (quarterback), Gibby Welch (left halfback), Jame Hagan (right halfback) and Dick Booth (fullback). Substitutes appearing in the game for Pitt were Charles Edwards, Walter Hoban, Tom Parkinson, Mike Getto, Richard Goldberg, Ray Montgomery, Andrew Salata, Philip Sargeant, Lester Cohen, Philip Goldberg, Chester Doverspike, Edward Seifert, Frank Shaw, Edward Sherako and Dwight Fyock.

=== Grove City ===
Week 2: Grove City at Pitt

Team	1	2	3	4	Total
Grove City	0	0	0	0	0
• Pitt	0	19	7	7	33

- Date: October 1, 1927
- Location: Pitt Stadium
  Pittsburgh, PA
- Game start: 2:30 p.m.
- Game attendance: 6,000
- Game weather: sunny
- Referee: S. A. McFarland (W. & J.)

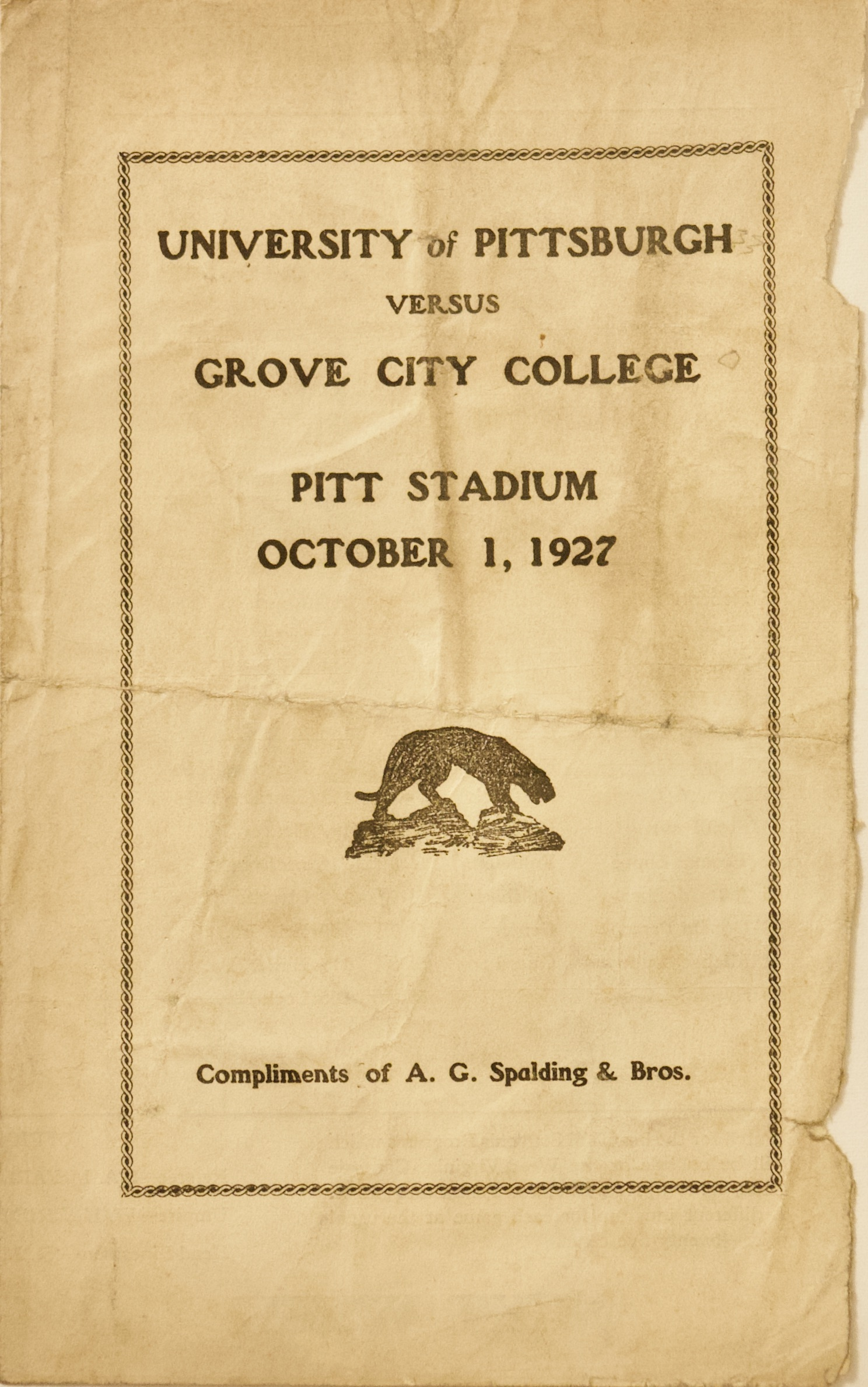
Roster sheet for October 1, 1927 Pitt vs. Grove City game

The Grove City eleven won the Tri-State district Class-B college championship in 1925 and 1926 under the tutelage of now Pitt assistant coach Charley Bowser. The Grovers replaced Bowser with Charlie Berry, a 1924 All-American end, who played for coach Jock Sutherland at Lafayette. Pitt had a commanding lead in the series at 7−2−1, with Grove City only scoring 7 points total in the past 8 meetings. This would be the final time that Pitt and Grove City would meet on the gridiron.

The Sunday Sun-Telegraph reported: "Under a torturing sun that robbed the atmosphere of anything suggesting football weather, the Pitt Panthers overwhelmed Grove City at the Pitt Stadium yesterday afternoon by the score of 33 to 0. Capt. Gibby Welsh of the Panthers, was on the sideline...While it was just a warm-up game, the Panthers looked far stronger than they did against Thiel a week ago...Conventional football with no tendency to open up, marked the Pitt attack...The story of the game was a succession of first downs, with Pitt always capable of making the necessary yardage."

Sutherland started the same linemen as the Thiel game but used Charles Edwards at quarterback, Walter Hoban at halfback and Tom Parkinson at fullback. By the time the gun sounded to end the game a total of twenty-five Panthers saw action.

The first quarter was scoreless but Pitt had possession on the Grove City 8-yard line to begin the second period. On second down Hoban went over from the six and Edwards drop-kicked the point after. The Pitt defense forced a punt and Pitt marched steadily down the field to the 4-yard line with James Hagan and Hoban doing the bulk of the ball-carrying. "Hagan rounded right end for the marker." Edwards missed the drop-kick and Pitt led 13 to 0. Pitt regained possession on the Grovers 42-yard line and "Booth worked loose at left guard and tore off 20 yards. On the next play Booth plunged at the center of the line, shook loose a half dozen tacklers and plunged a full five yards over the last man for a touchdown." Booth was unsuccessful on the point after and the halftime score stood at 19 to 0. Early in the third quarter Grove City had possession on the Pitt 27-yard line. Pitt end Albert Guarino intercepted a third down pass to thwart the Grovers drive. Pitt then proceeded to advance the ball the length of the field with sophomore fullback Parkinson toting it the last few yards for the score. Edwards nailed the drop-kick and Pitt led 26 to 0 at the end of three quarters. For the final tally, Parkinson scored with a "head-first dive over the Crimson's left guard." Edwards tacked on the extra point and Pitt won 33 to 0. Grove City finished their season with a 5–2–1 record.

The Pitt starting lineup for the game against Grove City was Felix Demoise (left end), William Kern (left tackle), John Roberts (left guard), Andrew Cutler (center), Alex Fox (right guard), Chester Wasmuth (right tackle), Albert Guarino (right end), Charles Edwards (quarterback), Walter Hoban (left halfback), James Hagan (right halfback) and Tom Parkinson (fullback). Substitutes appearing in the game for Pitt were Allan Booth, Mike Getto, Richard Goldberg, Ray Montgomery, Andrew Salata, Philip Sargeant, Lester Cohen, Philip Goldberg, Paul Fisher, Chester Doverspike, Edward Seifert, Frank Shaw, Edward Sherako and Dwight Fyock.

=== West Virginia ===
Week 3: West Virginia at Pitt

Team	1	2	3	4	Total
West Virginia	0	0	0	0	0
• Pitt	0	20	7	13	40

- Date: October 8, 1927
- Location: Pitt Stadium
  Pittsburgh, PA
- Game start: 2:30 p.m.
- Game attendance: 18,000-20,000
- Game weather: damp
- Referee: A. H. Sharpe (Yale)

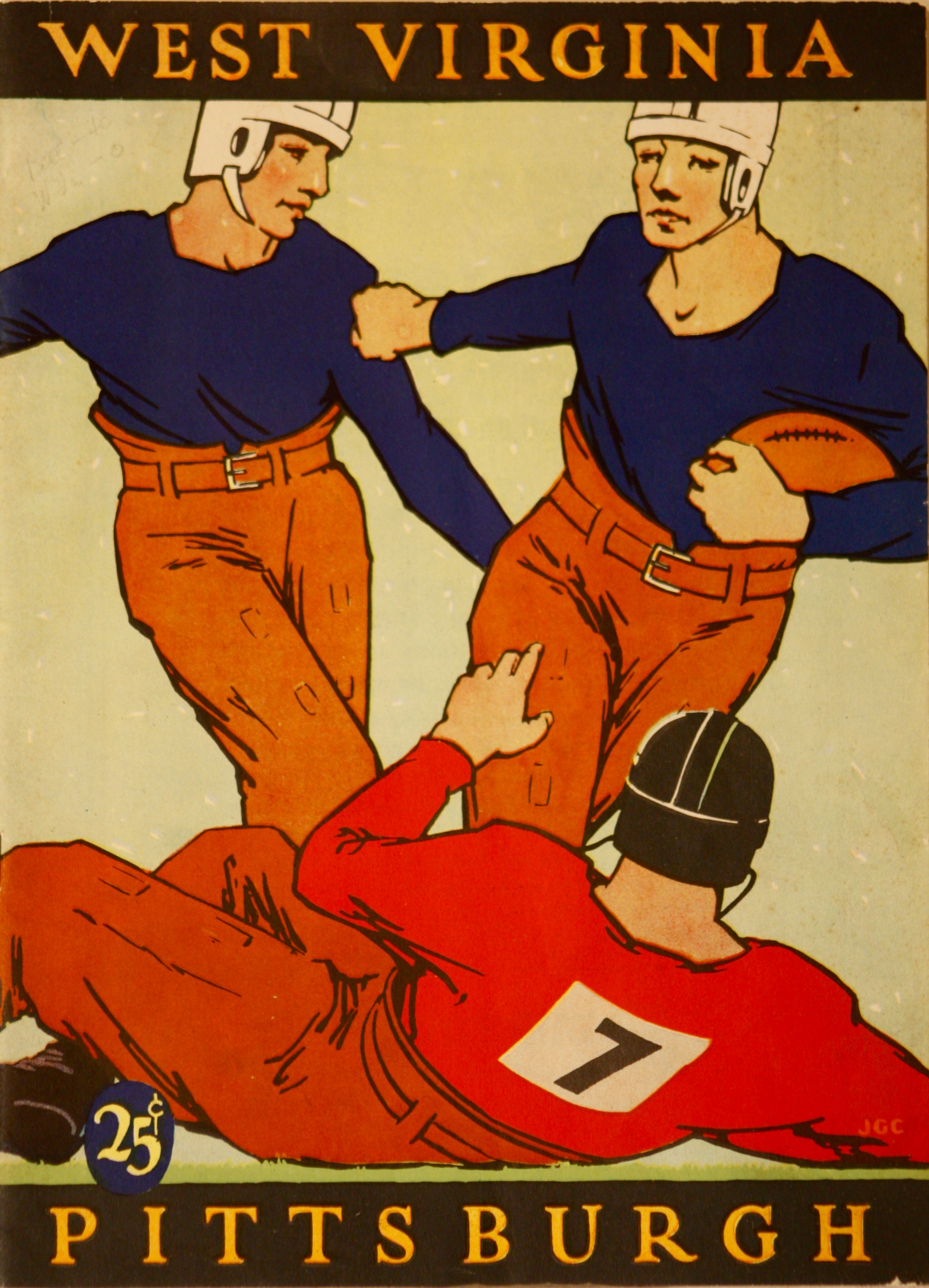
Program for October 8, 1927 Pitt vs. West Virginia game

The Pitt Weekly announced: "A fast and determined Mountaineer eleven invades the Panther's stadium lair Saturday afternoon to furnish it with its first major portion of football meat of the season." Ira Rodgers' Mountaineers were 1–0–1 on the season, having beaten West Virginia Wesleyan and tying former Pitt star Pat Herron's Washington & Lee Generals. "Rogers was not satisfied with the showing of his men and promises to have them at top form for the contest Saturday."

The Post-Gazette spoke with coach Sutherland: "My team has been hailed far and wide, and this first hard test will either prove that Pitt merits the favorable comment it has received or it will convince the 'too-enthusiastic' that football games are decided on the field and not on paper." Pitt led the series 14–7–1 with West Virginia and out scored the Mountaineers 352 to 146 in the twenty-two games played.

Excitement reigned on game day as four trains arrived from Morgantown with 1,500 Mountaineer fans and the West Virginia 62-member marching band. In addition two scoreboards were erected to keep the spectators up-to-date on the fourth game of the World Series between the Yankees and Pirates being played at Yankee Stadium.

The game day program cost $.25 and had a colorful art deco cover illustrated by John G. Carr, a former Pitt and Carnegie Tech student.(see photo)

The Sunday Sun-Telegraph gushed: "Making the sad mistake of invading Pittsburgh yesterday without taking the precaution to be supported by a company of Marines, the West Virginia University football team took the worst punch on its gridironistic chin that it has suffered in 20 years, being trampled under the ripping claws of Jock Sutherland's Golden Panthers to the merry tune of 40–0. Any football team that can beat West Virginia 40–0 is some team. Well, make no mistake – this Pitt team of 1927 is some team."

In the opening period the Pitt offense advanced the ball to the Mountaineers 9-yard line. On fourth down Charles Edwards attempted field goal was low and West Virginia gained possession on their 3-yard line. They punted out of danger and Pitt had possession on the Mountaineer 43-yard line. Four plays moved the ball to the West Virginia 27-yard line as time ran out in the first quarter. Pitt opened the second stanza with two pass plays that moved the ball to the 11-yard line. Allan Booth replaced an injured Tom Parkinson and ran the ball to the 4-yard line. Gilbert “Gibby” Welch gained a first down and "Booth crashed through center for a touchdown. Welch held the ball and Booth was successful in his try for extra point." Pitt 7; West Virginia 0. The 20,000 spectators were then treated to the play of the season. On the kick-off "Gibby caught the ball well back of his own goal line and twisting and dodging with the speed and grace of a Grange, raced through the entire West Virginia team for a touchdown. It was the greatest run in the history of the stadium, one of the greatest in the records of football." Booth missed the placement. Pitt 13; West Virginia 0. The third Pitt touchdown of the first half was scored by Walter Hoban on a two yard pass play from Welch. Booth converted the point and Pitt led 20 to 0 at halftime. Pitt added 3 touchdowns and one extra point in the second half. "By the middle of the third period there was not a single sub on the Pitt bench, and Coach Sutherland was hunting extra uniforms for the cheer leaders and pep boys."

Pitt totaled 29 first downs to 5 for the Mountaineers. West Virginia completed 3 of 6 passes and the Panthers were good on 6 of 10, one for a touchdown. Gibby Welch ran for 176 yards which was 10 yards more than the entire West Virginia team. West Virginia finished the season with a 2–4–3 record.

The Pitt starting lineup for the game against West Virginia was Felix Demoise (left end), William Kern (left tackle), Alex Fox (left guard), Andrew Cutler (center), John Roberts (right guard), Chester Wasmuth (right tackle), Albert Guarino (right end), Charles Edwards (quarterback), Gibby Welch (left halfback), James Hagan (right halfback) and Tom Parkinson (fullback). Substitutes appearing in the game for Pitt were Joe Donchess, Allan Booth, Richard Goldberg, Walter Hoban, Andrew Salata, Ray Montgomery, Paul Fisher, Philip Sargeant, Dwight Fyock, Frank Shaw, Mike Getto, Felix Wilps, Chester Doverspike and Lester Cohen.

=== At Drake ===
Week 4: Pitt at Drake

Team	1	2	3	4	Total
• Pitt	14	0	6	12	32
Drake	0	0	0	0	0

- Date: October 15, 1927
- Location: Drake Stadium
  Des Moines, IA
- Game start: 2:30 p.m.(CST)
- Game attendance: 7,000
- Game weather: clear
- Referee: Walter Eckersall (Chicago)

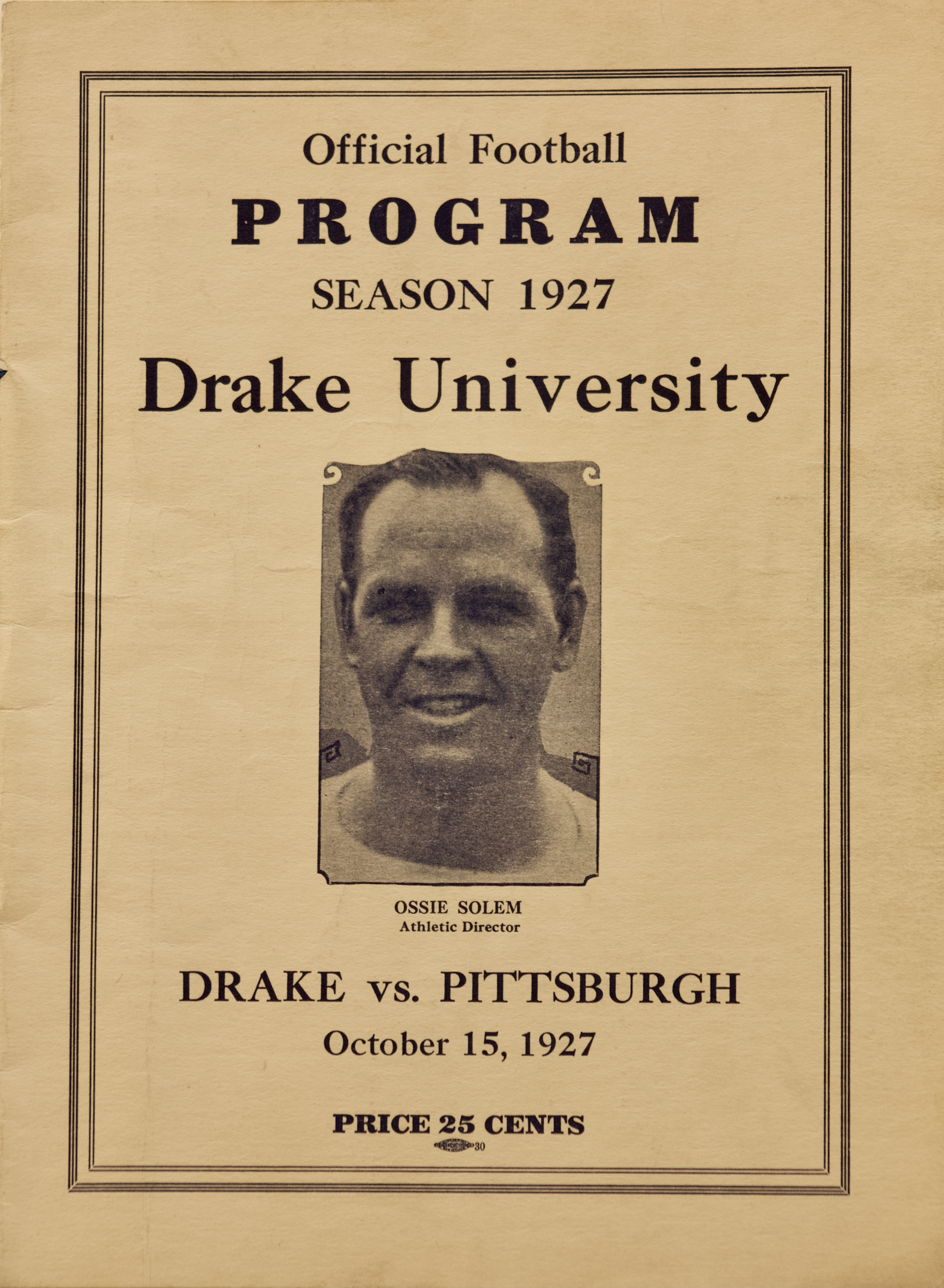
Program for October 15, 1927 Drake vs. Pitt game

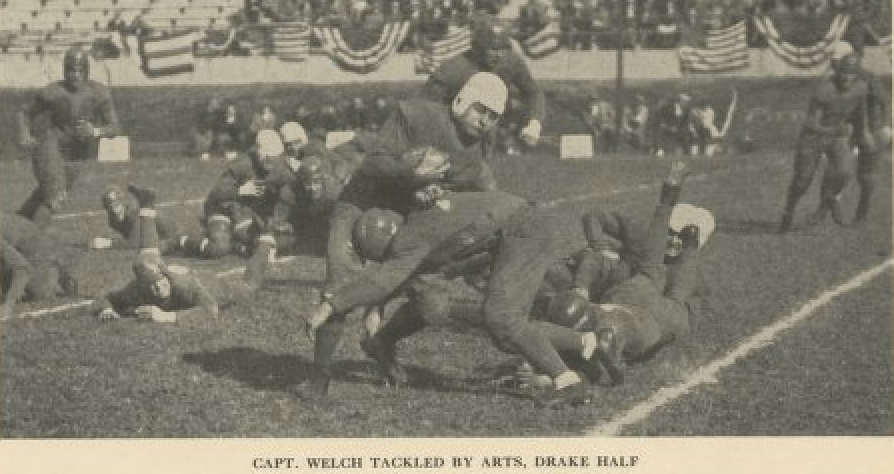
Gibby Welch being tackled by Drake halfback Arts, Oct. 15, 1927

The Panthers only road game of the season was to Des Moines, Iowa to take on the Drake Bulldogs coached by Ossie Solem. The game is “significant in football chronicles because Pitt was the first eastern team to play a local team at Des Moines.” The Bulldogs were 0–1 on the season having lost at Navy 35 to 6. Three times Drake had the ball inside the Middies 10-yard line and fumbled it away.

At practice Wednesday leading up to the Pitt game, Drake's team captain, Bill Cook, was banished from the team after a verbal altercation with coach Solem. Mr. Cook relented and rejoined the team on Friday. The Des Moines Register reported his statement: "Misunderstandings are bound to occur. I think too much of my coach and school to permit anything to come between us. Therefore, I have visited my coach and tomorrow when the Drake team takes the field I'll be there ready to give coach Solem and Drake University my very best efforts if I am called upon."

The Panthers departed Pittsburgh Wednesday night and arrived in Chicago Thursday morning for breakfast, a walk along Lake Michigan and practice on the University of Chicago's Stagg Field. They reboarded the train and arrived in Des Moines, IA Friday morning. Coach Sutherland led the team through a practice on Drake Field Friday afternoon. Jock expects Drake to be better than they showed at Navy and he is not sure his team is actually 40 points better than West Virginia, so "he is preparing for a battle at Des Moines, whether he gets it or not."

The Des Moines Register noted: "The showing of the Drake Bulldogs against Pittsburgh University's great football team at the Drake stadium yesterday was remarkable. The score was 32 to 0. Drake did not win. They call this dashing, smashing, crashing, hashing gang of visiting athletes the Golden Panthers. Indeed, they are eighteen carat specimens. Smart, fast, conditioned and well coached, it was perhaps the most highly polished eleven that ever played on a Drake gridiron."

Pitt fullback Allan Booth starred in the first quarter. Five minutes into the game the Pitt offense had advanced the ball from their 46-yard line to the Drake 5-yard line and "Booth slipped through center for the touchdown." He converted the point after and Pitt led 7 to 0. Drake kicked off and Pitt had first down on their 21-yard line. "Booth came through his right tackle, reversed his field, staved off two tacklers with a stiff arm and, with a perfect interference formed about him, raced seventy-nine yards for his second touchdown. He again converted from placement." Drake possessed the ball deep in Pitt territory twice in the second quarter but lost the ball both times on downs and did not threaten the Pitt goal again. Pitt led at the half 14 to 0.

In the third period "Booth ripped through center, stiff-armed two tacklers and dashed thirty-eight yards to Drake's 2-yard line. Welch plunged through left tackle for Pitt's third score. The attempted conversion was not good. The final period opened with a spectacular forty-two-yard touchdown pass from Welch to Albert Guarino. Again the conversion failed." Pitt led 26 to 0. Tom Parkinson replaced an injured Booth and scored on a two-yard rush after another sustained drive to bring the final tally to 32 to 0.

The statistics matched the lopsided score as the Panthers out gained the Bulldogs on the ground 363 yards to 125 yards. In the air Pitt also had the edge 50 yards to 30 yards. Drake earned 5 first downs to the Panthers 14. Drake finished the season with a 3–6 record.

The Pitt starting lineup for the game against Drake was Joe Donchess (left end), William Kern (left tackle), Alex Fox (left guard), Andrew Cutler (center), John Roberts (right guard), Chester Wasmuth (right tackle), Albert Guarino (right end), Charles Edwards (quarterback), Gibby Welch (left halfback), James Hagan (right halfback) and Allan Booth (fullback). Substitutes appearing in the game for Pitt were Tom Parkinson, Ray Montgomery, Toby Uansa, Mike Getto, Richard Goldberg, Andrew Salata, Paul Fisher, Felix Demoise and Chester Doverspike.

=== Carnegie Tech ===
Week 5: Carnegie Tech at Pitt

Team	1	2	3	4	Total
Carnegie Tech	0	0	7	0	7
• Pitt	0	14	0	9	23

- Date: October 22, 1927
- Location: Pitt Stadium
  Pittsburgh, PA
- Game start: 2:30 p.m.
- Game attendance: 58,000-60,000
- Game weather: clear
- Referee: A. H. Sharpe (Yale)

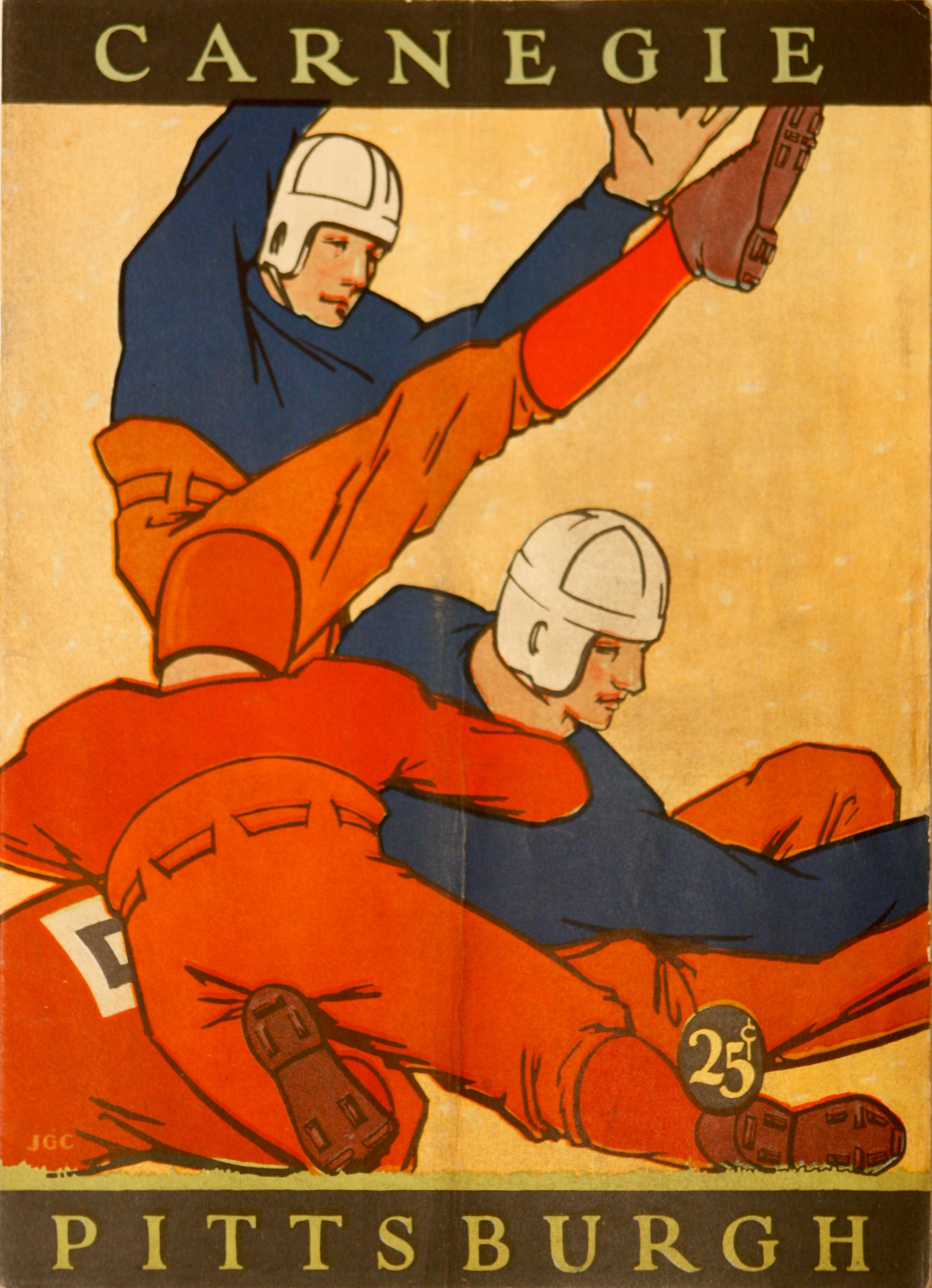
Program for October 22, 1927 Pitt vs. Carnegie Tech game

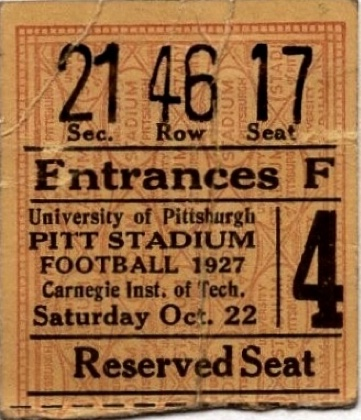
Ticket stub for October 22, 1927 Pitt vs. Carnegie Tech game

Since Carnegie Tech won three of the past four games versus the Panthers and defeated Notre Dame last season, the city championship took on increased significance in the Panther schedule. Pitt led the series 10–3 but "anytime you put 11 Techites and 11 Pittites on the same gridiron-it's a battle royal." Sixth year coach Walter Steffen's team was 3–1 for the season, having lost to Washington & Jefferson 20 to 6 in their last outing. Future All-American Howard Harpster was the quarterback and captain Purl Anderson anchored the line for the Tartans.

Since Pitt fullback Allan Booth was injured in the Drake game, Tom Parkinson was the only new face in the Pitt starting lineup. Jock Sutherland was cautious: "Naturally, I hope for a victory, but I anticipate no walkover."

The city championship bragging rights were being contested in three matches. The Tech versus Pitt cross country meet and freshmen football game both preceded the varsity game. "The Golden trimmed Pitt band, the plaid Kiltie clan, the victory-thirsty Pitt students, the loyal Skibos, the Pitt and Tech cheerleaders will all combine in a pre-planned sideline color and cheering demonstration that promises to surpass those of any of the 13 Pitt-Tech games of the past."

The Post-Gazette reported: "The football classic at Pitt stadium this afternoon will be broadcast by Westinghouse radio station KDKA, as a part of the Pittsburgh Post-Gazette sporting service. The kick-off is scheduled to take place at 2:30 o'clock. Preceding this event the announcer of KDKA will give the lineup of the two teams and tell of incidents that lead up to the start of the game, followed by a description of each play. So, tune in to KDKA if you find it impossible to attend the game and you will receive a mental picture of the classic."

The Pitt Weekly recapped: "The Golden Panthers with 58,000 people looking on made Carnegie Tech's greatest dread become a reality last Saturday afternoon in the stadium as they outfought the Tartans for a 23 to 7 score and regained the city championship."

The first quarter was scoreless as Tech advanced the ball to the Pitt 21-yard line but Harpster missed a drop-kick field goal. Late in the second period Pitt punted to the Tartans and the ball caromed off Cyril Letzelter and Joe Donchess fell on it for the Panthers at the Tech 5-yard line. On fourth down "there was a terrific pileup at center as Welch struck and the referee dove into the mass. When he got to the bottom he found the ball over the line for a touchdown as the Pitt stands went wild." Booth's placement kick was perfect and Pitt led 7 to 0. After the kick-off the Panthers defense held the Tartans and forced a punt. The Pitt offense utilized the passing game as Welch completed a 35 yard pass play to Albert Guarino to the Tech 30-yard line. A 14 yard pass play to Booth made it first down on the sixteen. Six running plays moved the ball to the 1-yard line. "Welch struck left tackle for the touchdown. Booth again kicked a perfect placement for the extra point." Pitt led 14 to 0 at halftime. In the third quarter James Hagan's punt was blocked and Tech tackle Robert Schmidt recovered on the Pitt 14-yard line. Glen Moorhead rounded left end for a first down on the 3-yard line. Moorhead took it to the two through right guard. "Letzelter plunged over for a touchdown at left guard" and he added the point after to make it 14 to 7 at the end of three quarters. The Pitt offense started the fourth stanza with the ball on their own 20-yard line. With Welch and Paul Fisher gaining huge chunks of yardage, the Panthers advanced to a first down on the Tartans 2-yard line and Tech needed a time out. On first down Hagan lost three yards. On second down Tom Parkinson gained three yards. On third down "Parkinson struck right guard for the touchdown." Booth missed the placement, but Pitt led 20 to 7. The Panthers threatened to score again as they drove from their 35-yard line through the Tartan defense to the Tech 10-yard line. The Tech defense held and Booth settled for a perfect 17-yard field goal to end the scoring. Pitt 23 to Tech 7. Carnegie Tech finished the season with a 5–4–1 record.

The Pitt starting lineup for the city championship was Joe Donchess (left end), William Kern (left tackle), Alex Fox (left guard), Andrew Cutler (center), John Roberts (right guard), Chester Wasmuth (right tackle), Albert Guarino (right end), Charles Edwards (quarterback), Gibby Welch (left halfback), James Hagan (right halfback) and Tom Parkinson (fullback). Substitutes appearing in the game for Pitt were Paul Fisher, Ray Montgomery, Allan Booth, Mike Getto, Richard Goldberg, Felix Demoise, Andrew Salata, Walter Hoban, Toby Uansa, Philip Sargeant, Dwight Fyock, Chester Doverspike and Felix Wilps.

=== Allegheny ===
Week 6: Allegheny at Pitt

Team	1	2	3	4	Total
Allegheny	0	0	0	0	0
• Pitt	32	13	7	0	52

- Date: October 29, 1927
- Location: Pitt Stadium
  Pittsburgh, PA
- Game start: 2:30 p.m.
- Game attendance: 5,000-8,000
- Game weather: clear
- Referee: R. M. Baird (Penn State)

Allegheny, which narrowly lost to the Panthers in 1926, "will trot into the stadium greatly under-rated and still thirsty for a real victory." Second year coach Melvin Merritt's Methodist's were 0–3–1 on the season. Allegheny beat Pitt in 1901 and 1902 but since then the series has been all Panthers as they have won four straight and out scored the boys from Meadville 171–14. "Coach Merritt is confident that this team will shake the jinx that has persisted ever since the second half of the Dartmouth game, and that the Panthers will find a victory no easy matter."

The Pittsburgh Post-Gazette noted: "The game with Allegheny provides a breathing spell between the trying first half of the Pitt schedule and the much more difficult second half." Charles Edwards, William Kern, Walter Hoban, Paul Fisher and James Hagan were all injured to some degree in the Tech game and were questionable for action against Allegheny. Coach Sutherland hoped to make liberal use of his reserves.

Havey Boyle of The Sunday Sun-Telegraph put it simply: "The second, third and fourth-string players on the Pitt varsity football team trampled Allegheny, 52 to 0, yesterday afternoon at the Pitt Stadium before a crowd of 8,000 persons." "It wasn't easy for the Golden Panthers, with five or six regulars on the bench at the start of the game, it was a cinch."

Pitt scored five touchdowns and two extra points in the first quarter, then tacked on two touchdowns and another point after in the second stanza to register a halftime score of 45 to 0. The Methodists fared much better in the second half holding the Panther fourth string to one touchdown and conversion. An odd play occurred in the second quarter. After Toby Uansa scored his touchdown, in lieu of kicking, the Panthers decided to run the ball for the extra point. "(Felix ) Welps was given the chance and he was successful much to the amazement of the Allegheny players and spectators." Allegheny finished the season 0–7–1.

The Pitt starting lineup for the game against Allegheny was Felix Demoise (left end), Mike Getto (left tackle), Alex Fox (left guard), Richard Goldberg (center), Ray Montgomery (right guard), Chester Wasmuth (right tackle), Philip Sargeant (right end), Andrew Salata (quarterback), Gibby Welch (left halfback), Toby Uansa (right halfback) and Dwight Fyock (fullback). Substitutes appearing in the game for Pitt were Arthur Corson, Chester Doverspike, Felix Wilps, Edward Seifert, Ted Helsing, Frank Shaw, Philip Goldberg, Lester Cohen, Reginald Bowen, Edward Sherako, Lester Zeedick, Louis Marohnic, Frank Mahoney and Ted Meier.

=== Washington & Jefferson ===
Week 7: Washington & Jefferson at Pitt

Team	1	2	3	4	Total
W. & J.	0	0	0	0	0
Pitt	0	0	0	0	0

- Date: November 5, 1927
- Location: Pitt Stadium
  Pittsburgh, PA
- Game start: 2:00 p.m.
- Game attendance: 50,000-52,000
- Game weather: snow & rain
- Referee: W. G. Crowell (Swarthmore)

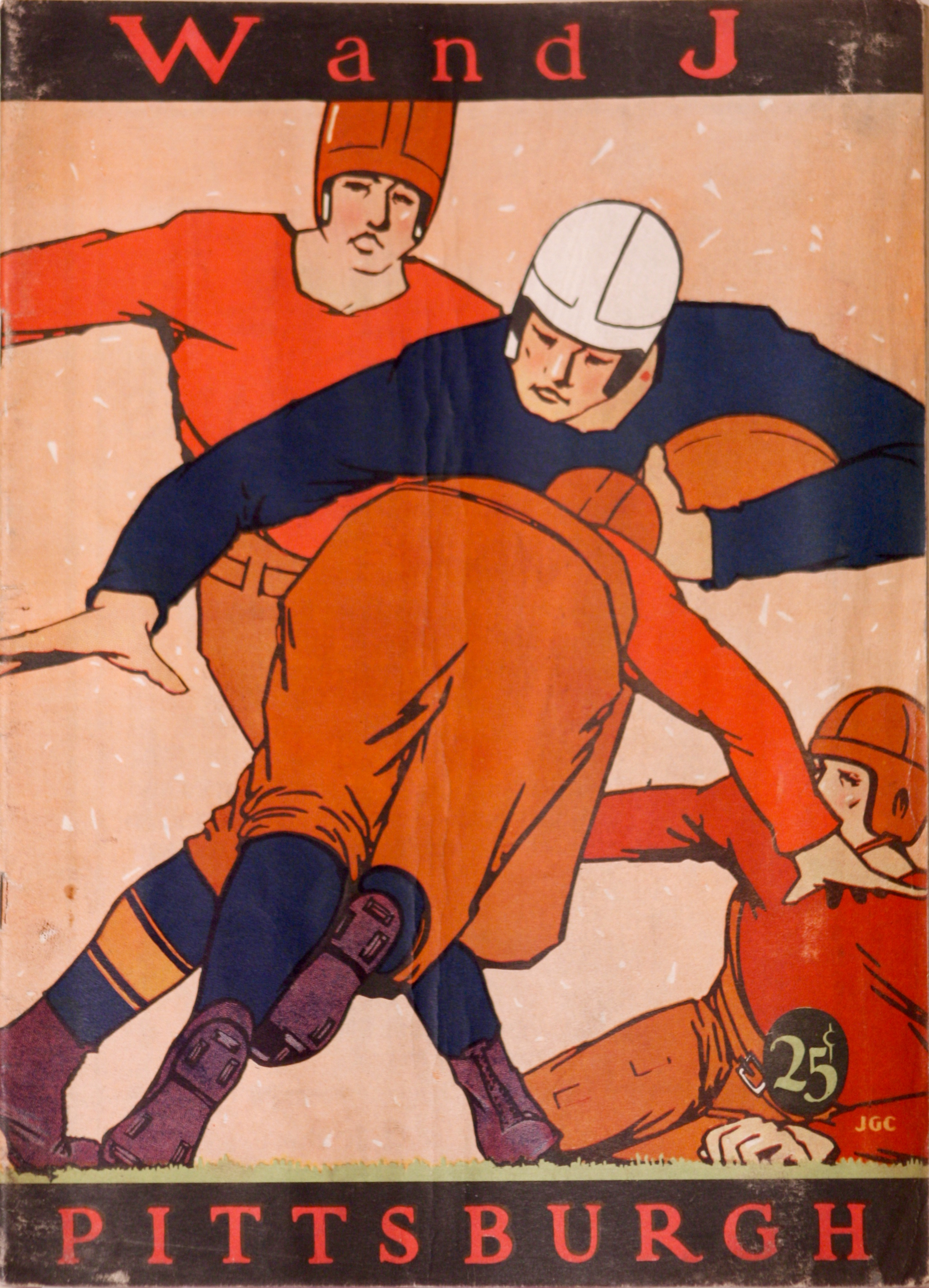
Program for November 5, 1927 Pitt vs. W. & J. game

Coach Andy Kerr and his W. & J. Presidents were undefeated at 6–0 on the season and led by two All-Americans – tackle Jap Douds and fullback Bill Amos. "Year after year, W. & J. has come to Pitt Stadium favored to win, and on just as many occasions a weaker Pitt team has risen to heights of power and turned back the touted Presidents." From 1890 through 1914 Wash.-Jeff. dominated this series with an 11–4 lead. Beginning in 1915 Pitt reversed the trend by winning 9 of the next 12 games to even the series at 13–13–1.

Most of the injured Panthers were back in the starting lineup but both quarterbacks Charles Edwards and Paul Fisher were unable to play. Tom Parkinson and Andrew Salata were able replacements. The rain and snow forecasted may cause a "sea of mud" and slow the action considerably.

Max E. Hannum reported: "For the second consecutive season, Pitt and W. & J. could come to no decision in their annual gridiron battle, and as 50,000 spectators surrounded a soggy and rain-soaked field and the football world awaited with breathless interest the heralded meeting of the ancient rivals, with a possible championship at stake, Panther and president again battled to a scoreless tie."

Allan Booth attempted three field goals - from 39 yards in the first quarter; from 40 yards in the second period; and from 34 yards in the final quarter. They all fell short. In the fourth quarter Pitt advanced the ball to the Presidents' 30-yard line. "Gibby Welch squirming through left tackle, had traveled 12 yards when he was thrown heavily and dropped the ball, Gallagher recovering for Washington & Jefferson." Both defenses were superb. Jap Douds was lauded as the defensive star of the game for the Presidents.

Coach Sutherland spoke with The Sunday Sun-Telegraph: "I am very proud of the boys. On account of injuries, the Pitt team was undeniably weakened, but this handicap was offset to some extent by sheer grit and determination the players displayed. The line play should be recorded as the best that any Pitt eleven has shown in the gridiron history of the school. Playing conditions handicapped both teams, and I believe that had the field been dry, the result might have been different. I agree with W. & J. men that the Presidents have the best team and the greatest backfield of any team my eleven has faced this year." The Presidents finished the season with a 7–0–2 record

At halftime Dr. S. S. Baker, President of W. & J., presented a memorial tablet in honor of A. R. Hamilton to the University. The tablet was placed on the wall of the stadium and contained the following praise: "The Athletic Council of Washington and Jefferson College presents this tablet to the University of Pittsburgh in memoriam of Alfred Reed Hamilton - Who gave unsparingly of time, thought and means to the support and maintenance of true athletic principles and practice and for this reason his memory lives in both institutions."

The Pitt starting lineup for the game against Washington & Jefferson was Joe Donchess (left end), William Kern (left tackle), Alex Fox (left guard), Andrew Cutler (center), John Roberts (right guard), Chester Wasmuth (right tackle), Albert Guarino (right end), Tom Parkinson (quarterback), Gibby Welch (left halfback), James Hagan (right halfback) and Allan Booth (fullback). The only substitution for the Panthers during the game was Ray Montgomery replacing Alex Fox.

=== Nebraska ===
Week 8: Nebraska at Pitt

Team	1	2	3	4	Total
Nebraska	7	0	6	0	13
• Pitt	7	14	0	0	21

- Date: November 12, 1927
- Location: Pitt Stadium
  Pittsburgh, PA
- Game start: 2:00 p.m.
- Game attendance: 30,000-35,000
- Game weather: wet field, cold wind
- Referee: Ed Thorpe (De LaSalle Institute)

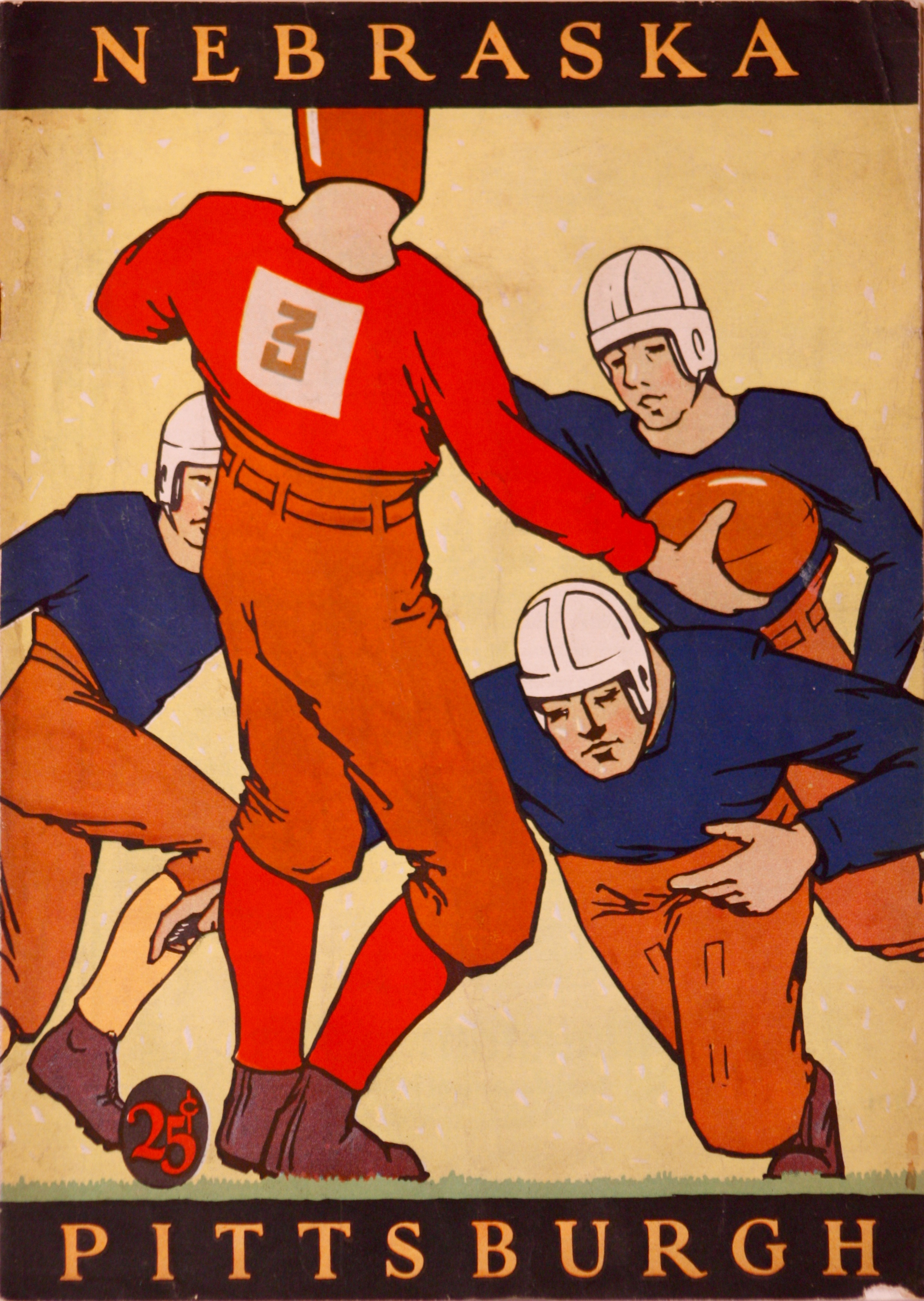
Program for November 12, 1927 Pitt vs. Nebraska game

Third year coach Ernest Bearg and the Nebraska eleven came east to engage in their second intersectional battle of the season. The Cornhuskers record stood at 4–1 with a loss by one point at Missouri their only misstep. The heavy Nebraska lineup featured three All-Americans: tackle Ray Randels, guard Danny McMullen and halfback Glenn Presnell. "The last meeting of the teams was in 1921 at Forbes Field, when the Westerners scored a 10 to 0 triumph over one of 'Pop' Warner's best elevens."

The Panthers hoped for a dry field to better utilize their passing game because the Cornhuskers had only given up 4 first downs on the ground. "Dr. Sutherland, however, is frankly pessimistic for the first time this season. His pessimism should carry some weight, for he has not broken out with any lamentations previously this year. He has claimed right along that Nebraska would be as tough as any team on the schedule and with the game right upon us it would appear that the doctor knows what he has been talking about." With both starting quarterbacks still ailing, Sutherland started the game with the same lineup used in the Washington & Jefferson game.

Harry G. Scott in his book "Jock Sutherland – Architect of Men" summarized this game: "When Coach Ernest Bearg came to town with his big Nebraska Cornhuskers, the spectators were in for one of the most scintillating games ever played in Pittsburgh. Behind flawless interference, (Gibby) Welch took the opening kickoff and rushed ninety-seven yards down the field in his second superlative touchdown run of the season! Nebraska countered with a 51 yard drive to its goal line, spearheaded by the hard-running Glenn Presnell and Blue Howell and aided and abetted by a magnificent line. Before the half ended, (James) Hagan made the second score for Pitt on a dazzling 63 yard run from scrimmage. Then, on a pass from Hagan, Welch made his second long touchdown sprint of the game - seventy-one yards. The conversion was good as the two previous ones had been. Nebraska was able to put on only one more scoring march, and the victory went to the Panthers, 21–13."

Coach Sutherland was pleased: "The result of the Pitt-Nebraska game simply proves that a fighting team can always win, and is always dangerous. Our team fought hard and they swept Nebraska off their feet right at the start...Nebraska has a fine team, the best we have met this year...Both teams played hard clean football and both deserve a world of credit for the fine exhibition of football they put up. I have nothing but praise for the Nebraska players and for Coach Bearg."

Coach Bearg was gracious: "Pitt is the best team we have played since I have been at Nebraska and the only team able to score 21 points on us in four years. They played perfect football and would have beaten any team in the country yesterday...Pitt has a great football team." The Cornhuskers finished the season with a 6–2 record.

The Pitt starting lineup for the game against Nebraska was Joe Donchess (left end), William Kern (left tackle), Alex Fox (left guard), Andrew Cutler (center), John Roberts (right guard), Chester Wasmuth (right tackle), Albert Guarino (right end), Tom Parkinson (quarterback), Gibby Welch (left halfback), James Hagan (right halfback) and Allan Booth (fullback). Substitutes appearing in the game for Pitt were Andrew Salata, Ray Montgomery, Toby Uansa, Mike Getto and Felix Demoise.

=== Penn State ===
Week 9: Penn State at Pitt

Team	1	2	3	4	Total
Penn State	0	0	0	0	0
• Pitt	0	9	7	14	30

- Date: November 24, 1927
- Location: Pitt Stadium
  Pittsburgh, PA
- Game start: 2:00 p.m.
- Game attendance: 57,051-60,000
- Game weather: sunny
- Referee: W. G. Crowell (Swarthmore)

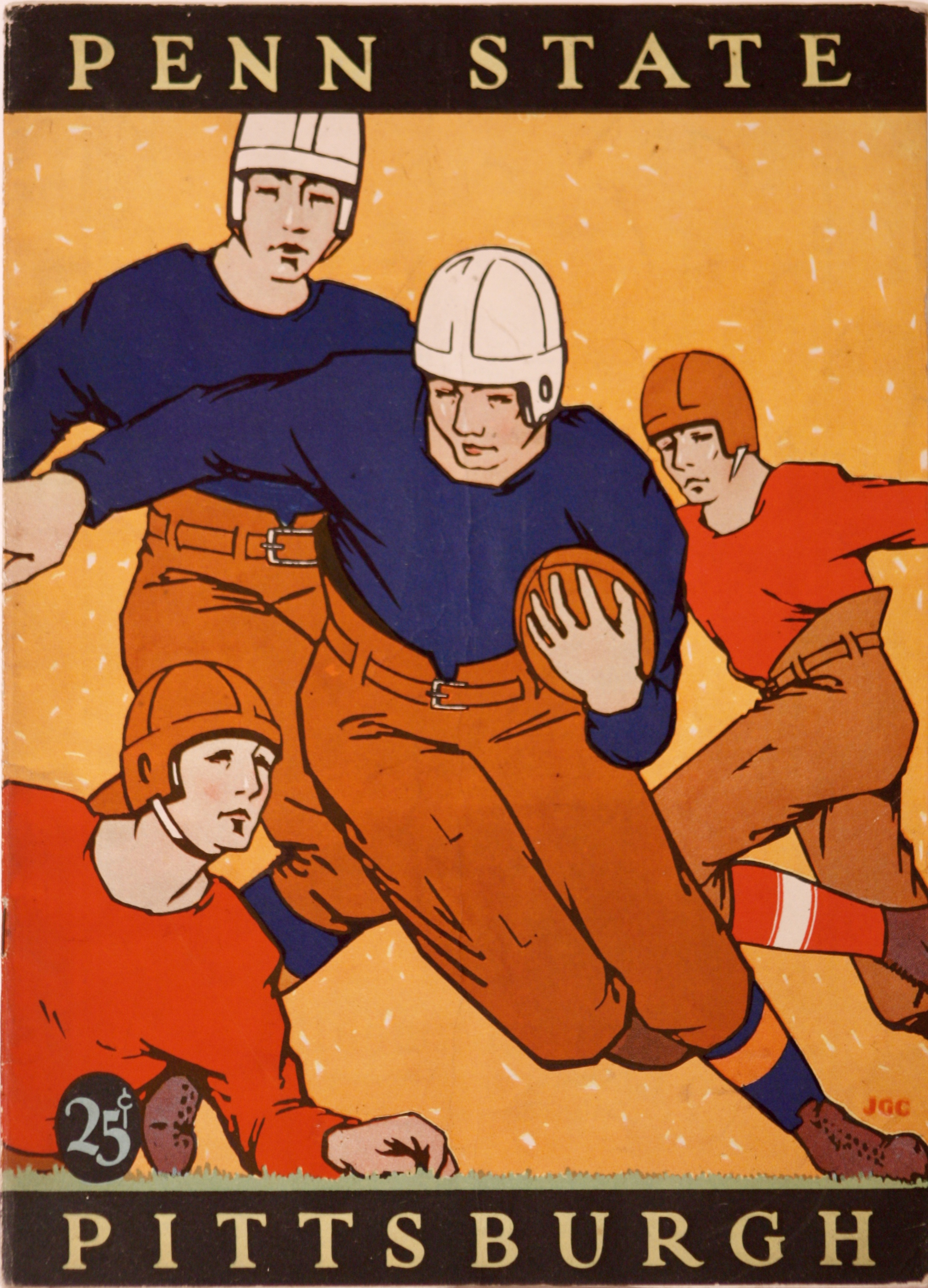
Program for November 24, 1927 Pitt vs. Penn State game

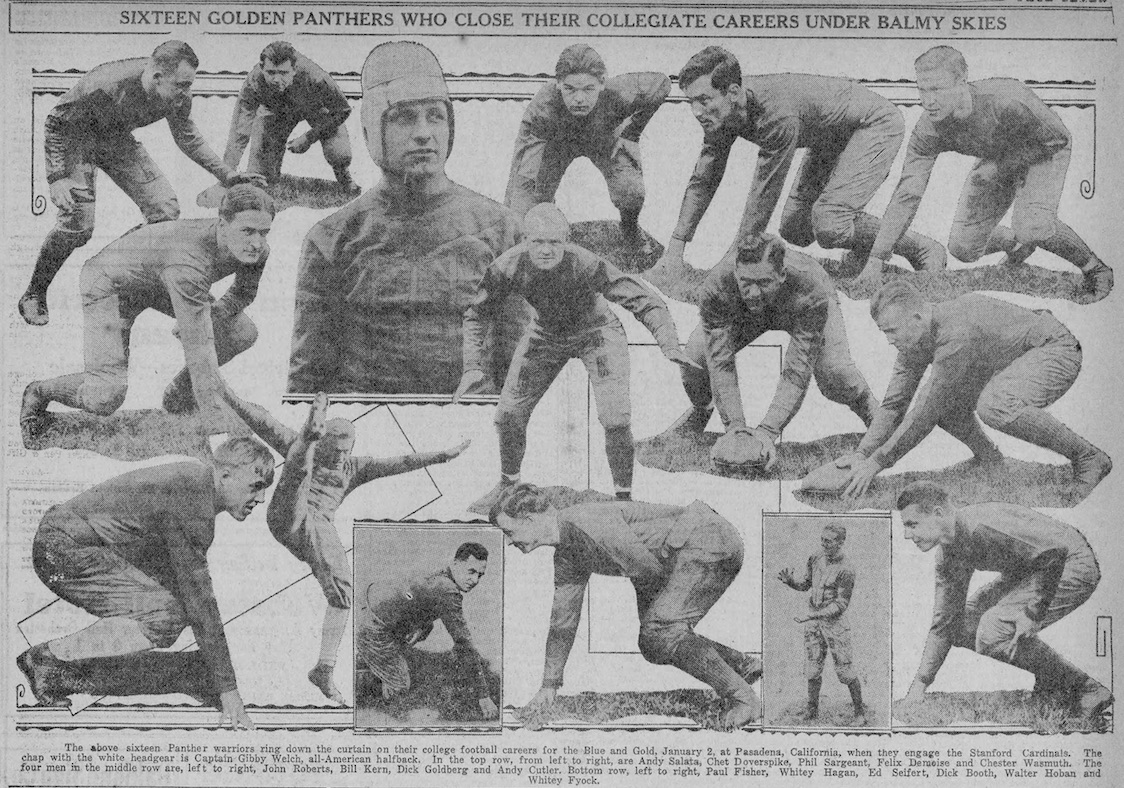
Pitt seniors participating in their last game in Pitt Stadium, November 24, 1927

For the undefeated Pitt Panthers, a Thanksgiving Day victory would merit the championship of western Pennsylvania and the entire east, a claim to the national title and an invitation to the Rose Bowl. Tenth-year coach Hugo Bezdek and his Nittany Lion squad stood in the way. Penn State was 6–1–1 for the season, having lost to Bucknell early 13–7 and tying a strong NYU team 13–13. The team was led by halfback Johnny Roepke, a "triple-threat" man, who could kick, pass, or run with equal ability and was named to Walter Eckersall's All-America third team. "The Lions are determined to make amends for the seven lean years they have experienced since they last defeated Pitt." "The Nittany youths will be the underdogs tomorrow, but no underdog ever had a better chance to win an important game."

Coach Sutherland's quarterbacks (Charles Edwards and Paul Fisher) were both healthy which "should add that smoothness to the Panther attack that seemed missing at times." Coach Sutherland was concerned that the team may be "California Dreaming" and not thinking about the game at hand. "If they think too much about going to the Coast, the first thing they know, they'll take one on the button in this State game Thursday. After the state game is the time to think about taking the train for the West."

Regis M. Welsh of the Pittsburgh Post-Gazette reported: "On to California rides one of the greatest Pitt teams ever to grace a local gridiron. Back to Penn State limps another famed Nittany team, clawed even worse than before, to tell the natives the annual story of a sad Thanksgiving day. Into the annals of football goes one of the most daring and spectacular of all Pitt halfbacks. All because yesterday, with an almost summer sun shining down on 60,000 holiday fans, the Pitt Panther of 1927, its nationwide supremacy challenged by what had been rumored as one of the best Penn State teams of the last 20 years, surpassed all but one of the previous conquests of the Nittany, functioned as it never did before during this season, and as a crowning glory to one of Pitt's greatest years, actually romped away with a 30 to 0 victory."

After a scoreless first quarter in which Allan Booth fell inches short on a 23-yard field goal attempt, Pitt took control of the game. James Hagan punted to the State on their 10-yard line. On second down State halfback John Miller tried a right end sweep and was tackled in the end zone by William Kern for a safety. Pitt led 2–0. Pitt regained possession on their 44-yard line. Hagan gained 25 yards and Gibby Welch tacked on 23 yards and Pitt had first down on the Nittany 7-yard line. Booth ripped through the State line to the 3-yard line. Hagan followed with a plunge to the one-foot line. Booth scored the touchdown and added the extra point. The Panthers had the ball on the State 3-yard line as time expired in the half with Pitt ahead 9 to 0. In the third period Pitt blocked a State punt and gained possession on their 40-yard line. Seven running plays moved the ball to the two-yard line where Welch tore through the line in front of great blocking and scored the touchdown. Booth tacked on the point and Pitt led 16 to 0 at the end of three quarters. Early in the final stanza Roepke fumbled and Pitt recovered on their 39-yard line. The Panthers methodically advanced the ball to the State 3-yard line and Booth "crashed over for an touchdown." His placement was perfect and Pitt led 23 to 0. "The final score came as an aftermath to a series of forward passes, double passes and triple passes." Hagan got the touchdown and Booth completed a perfect day of placements. Coach Sutherland used his bench players for the final minutes. Pitt 30 to Penn State 0.

The Panthers totally dominated as they gained 391 yards to 76 for State and earned 21 first downs to their 5.

The Pitt starting lineup for the game against Penn State was Joe Donchess (left end), William Kern (left tackle), Alex Fox (left guard), Andrew Cutler (center), John Roberts (right guard), Chester Wasmuth (right tackle), Albert Guarino (right end), Charles Edwards (quarterback), Gibby Welch (left halfback), James Hagan (right halfback) and Allan Booth (fullback).; Substitutes appearing in the game for Pitt were Paul Fisher, Andrew Salata, Ray Montgomery, Felix Demoise, Dwight Fyock, Walter Hoban, Richard Goldberg, Chester Doverspike, Philip Sargeant and Edward Seifert.

=== Alumni exhibition game ===
Week 10: Alumni at Pitt

Team	1	2	3	4	Total
Alumni	0	0	0	0	0
• Pitt	0	2	0	0	2

- Date: December 10, 1927
- Location: Pitt Stadium
  Pittsburgh, PA
- Game start: 2:00 p.m.
- Game attendance: 7,000
- Game weather: cold
- Referee: Dan B. Dougherty (W. & J.)

On December 10, "a host of former Panther stars, determined that the 1927 aggregation shall not go unprepared to the coast to meet Stanford in the tournament of roses game on Jan. 2, have taken a most practical method of insuring it. They will offer their more or less aged bodies as a sacrifice to the conditioning process for Dr. Sutherland's current eleven, and the public is welcome to watch the business free of charge."

Max Hannum of The Pittsburgh Press reported: "For the second time this season, the Golden Panther was prevented from crossing another team's goal line. Andy Kerr's Presidents turned the trick the first time, and Charley Bowser's aggregation of old-timers duplicated the feat yesterday at the Pitt stadium." Pitt won the game 2 to 0. They scored in the second quarter when alumni center Marsh Johnson snapped the ball high over Jack Harding's head and into and out of the end zone for a safety. About 7,000 people ventured to the stadium for one last chance to see the varsity and also to see some former stars. "The contest proved to be an excellent workout for the varsity."

=== vs Stanford (Rose Bowl) ===
Rose Bowl: Pitt at Stanford

Team	1	2	3	4	Total
Pitt	0	0	6	0	6
• Stanford	0	0	7	0	7

- Date: January 2, 1928
- Location: Rose Bowl (stadium)
  Pasadena, CA
- Game start: 2:15 p.m.
- Game attendance: 58,000
- Game weather: sunny & hot
- Referee: Bob Evans

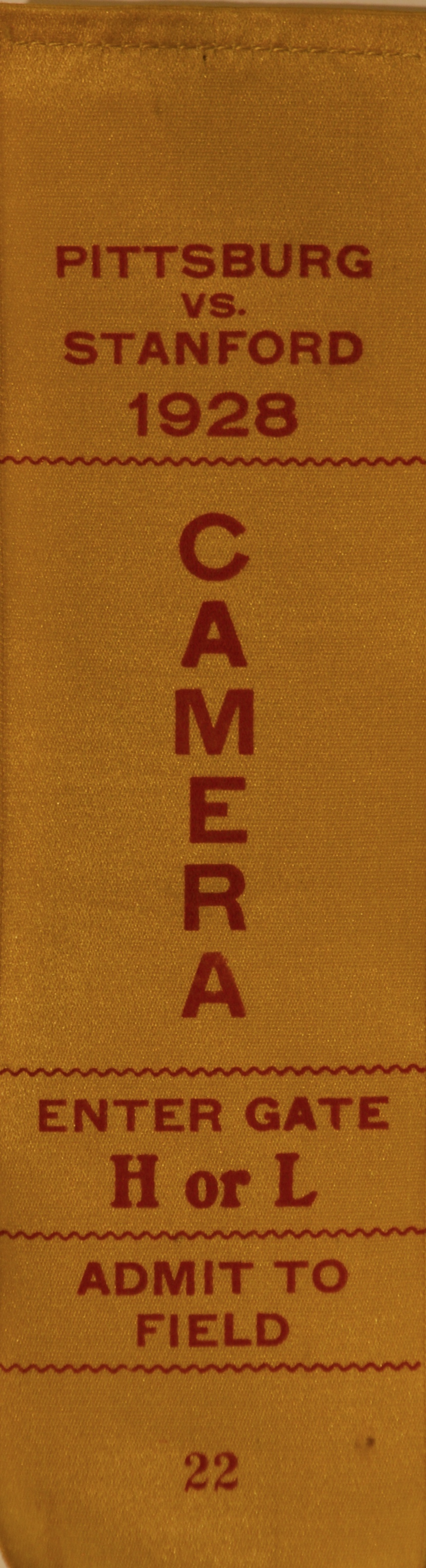
Photographer's ribbon for January 2, 1928 Rose Bowl game

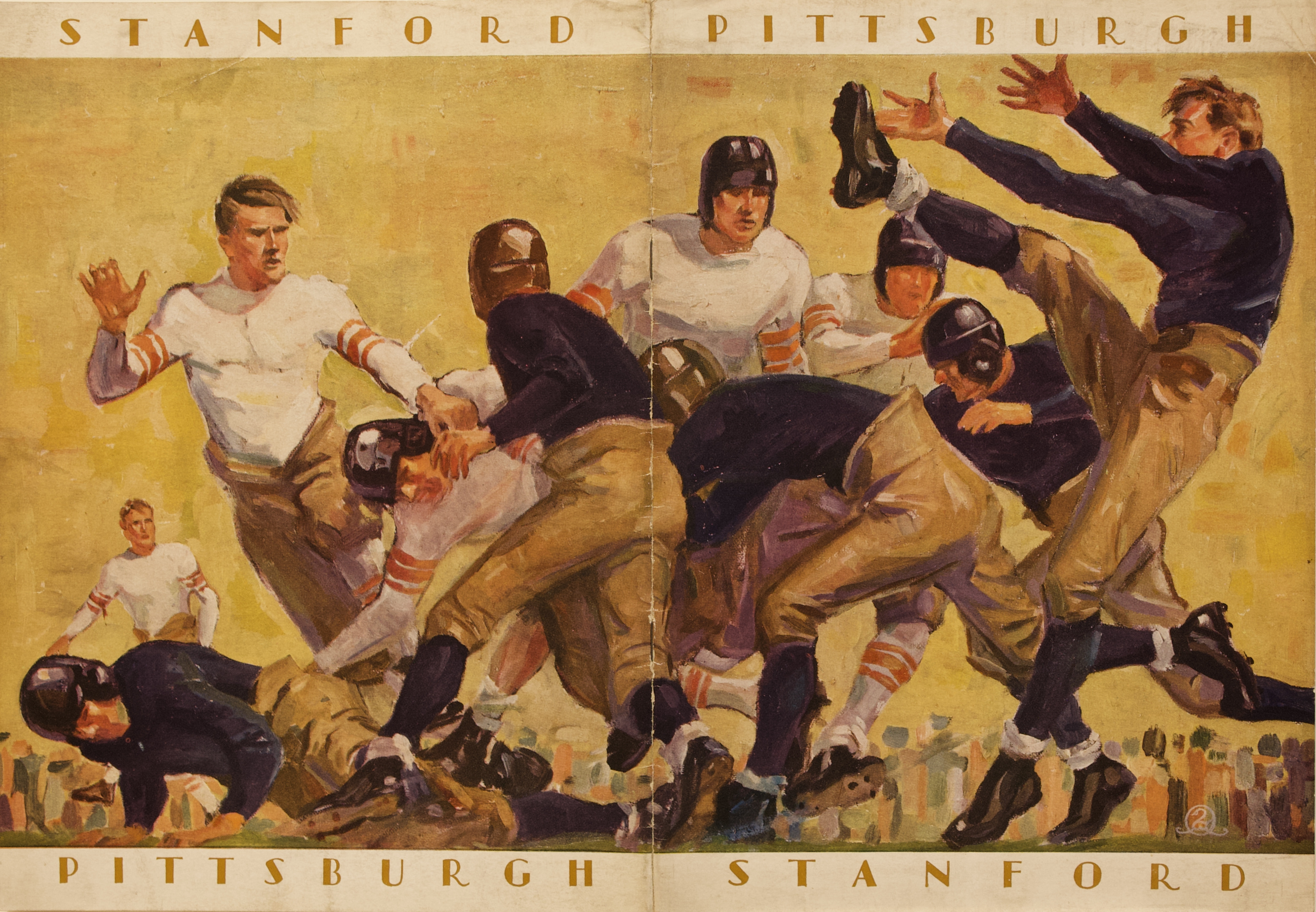
Official 1928 Rose Bowl program

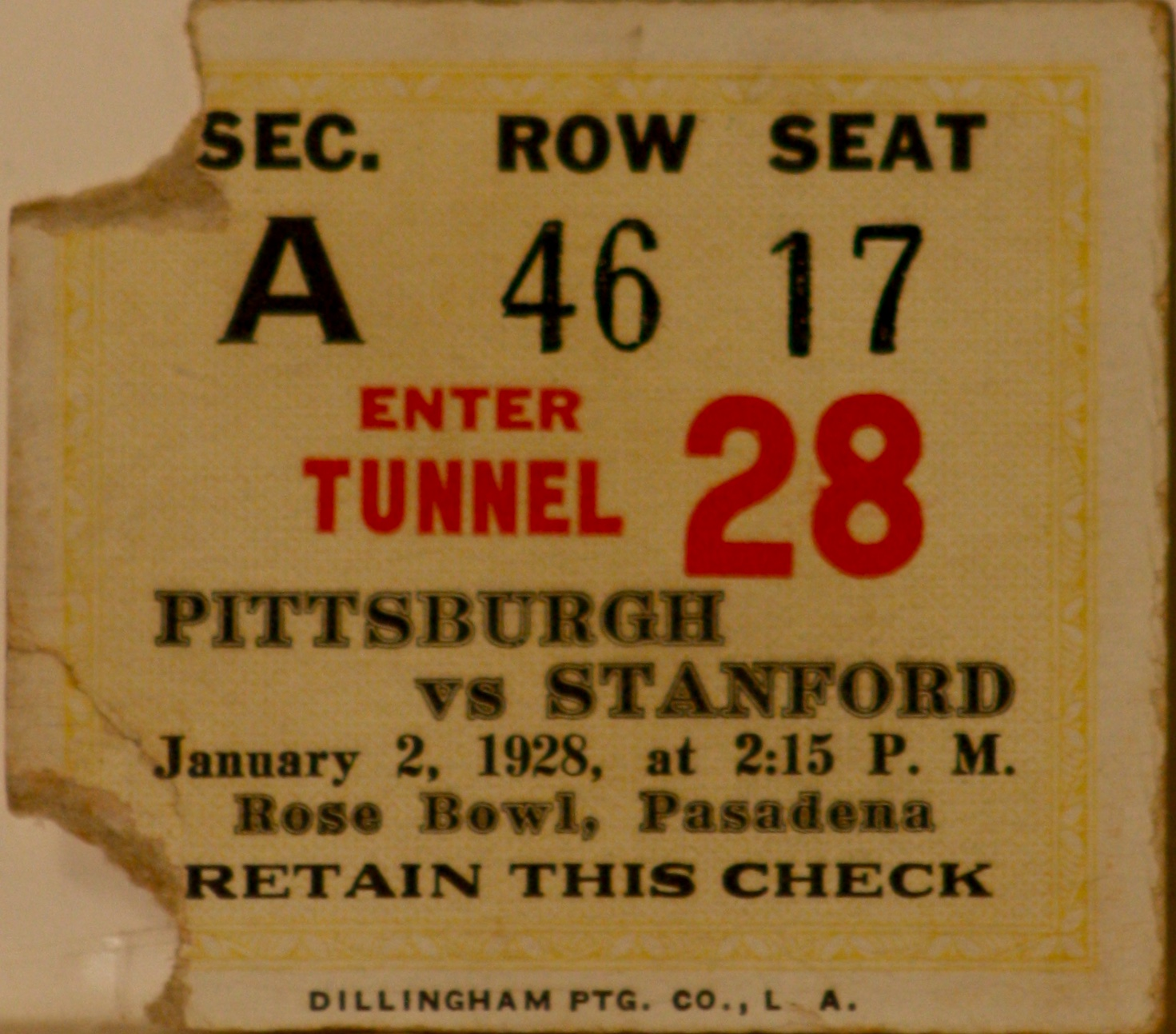
Ticket stub for January 2, 1928 Rose Bowl

The day after the Penn State game Pitt received the following invitation: "Stanford officially offers you an invitation to meet them in football on January 2, 1928, at Pasadena. Please advise as soon as possible and contract will follow." The Pitt athletic council answered: "The University of Pittsburgh accepts your invitation to play the Leland Stanford University football team at the Tournament of Roses, January 2, 1928."

Fourth-year Coach John B. "Jock" Sutherland led the Panthers to an undefeated season, Eastern Championship, and first Rose Bowl invitation for the University to play Stanford, coached by Sutherland's own coach and predecessor, Glenn Scobey "Pop" Warner.

Glenn Warner stepped down as Pitt coach at the conclusion of the 1923 season and took over the Stanford football program. His initial season (1924) was a success as he led the Cardinals to a 7–1–1 record and trip to the Rose Bowl where they lost 27-10 to Notre Dame. His 1926 team went unbeaten and returned to the Rose Bowl to play Alabama. That game ended in a 7 to 7 tie. His 1927 Stanford eleven lost two games and had an 7–2–1 record but received the Rose Bowl invitation again. On Thanksgiving Day Coach Warner was in Pitt Stadium scouting the Panthers. "When Pop Warner spends more than a month preparing for a foe you can bet a few simoleons that his team won't be any slouch...The veteran mentor has had Andy Kerr, whose W. & J. team tied the Panthers, helping him in practice and on top of this will have the psychological edge of being the underdog. 'Pop' really shouldn't need much more in this case."

Stanford had three players who were mentioned on All-American teams: fullback, Biff Hoffman; center John McCreery and guard Seraphim Post.

"The first Pitt team to travel to the West Coast for an intersectional postseason game left Pittsburgh in two labeled Pullman cars on (Monday) December 26, 1927, at nine o'clock in the evening. They stopped in Dodge City, Kansas, on Wednesday for a four-hour practice and at Albuquerque, New Mexico, on Thursday for a three-hour practice." The Friday stop at Ashfork, Arizona was switched to Winslow, Arizona, due to weather conditions. "With the entire squad kicking the ball around and messing things up in general, Sutherland cut the drill short to the disappointment of the spectators, who were enjoying the show immensely." The team attracted large groups of spectators wherever they stopped and local entertainment was provided. On Saturday morning they arrived in Pasadena, where they were welcomed by a great crowd before leaving the station for their headquarters, the Hotel Vista Del Arroyo. Saturday and Sunday's practice was held in the Rose Bowl.

Max E. Hannum of The Pittsburgh Press reported that Coach Sutherland was worried: "We will have to be 25 percent stronger than Stanford to win. They know the conditions out here, and if the day is as warm as it promises to be, we will undoubtedly be handicapped. The boys are just now realizing the gravity of the task confronting them and I am afraid they cannot shake off a week of picnicking. Warner has primed his team as he rarely has before. Charley (Bowser) and I are nerving ourselves for defeat."

Ralph Davis of The Pittsburgh Press noted: "Today's Rose Bowl fracas will be described by radio to millions of people all over the land. A gigantic aerial hook-up has been arranged and about 5 o'clock this afternoon fans all over the nation will listen in on the start of the contest, and thereafter follow it eagerly until the last play has been consummated. Graham McNamee will have lots of material with which to paint his vivid word picture of the gridiron classic."

The Pasadena Evening Post wrote: "A warm sun and balmy breezes played on a crowd of around 65,000 persons, gathered in this stadium today to see Pittsburgh and Stanford settle a football argument, the annual Tournament of Roses classic."

The 1928 Rose Bowl game was a strenuous defensive battle won by Stanford 7 to 6. Two fumbles in the third quarter, within six minutes of each other, both committed by Stanford, produced both touchdowns. The first occurred when Stanford had possession on their 20-yard line. "On the second play (Frank) Wilton started around Pitt's right end on a reverse, but was tackled hard and the ball shot out of his hands. (James) Hagan was on it like a hawk, and, scooping it up on the bound, he dashed over the Cardinal goal without anybody laying a hand on him." Allan Booth attempted the point after but Stanford's substitute lineman Walter Heinecke, "shot out of the line like a cannonball. Booth no more than got the ball off the ground before Heinecke had it smothered, smothered like a mother cradles her baby from impending harm." Pitt kicked off and the Stanford offense advanced the ball to the Pitt 2-yard line. The Pitt defense had held Stanford twice inside their 5-yard line earlier. They again defended their goal for the first three downs. On fourth down, Wilton tossed a pass to Robert Sims, who touched it but never had possession. "Wilton following in after the pass recovered the ball and raced over for the score." Clifford “Biff” Hoffman converted the point after and the Stanford Cardinals won the Rose Bowl for Pop Warner on their third try.

Max Hannum was upset with the officials' call on the Stanford touchdown. The announcer in the press box stated that "Sims tipped the ball and then a Pitt man touched it. After that Wilton recovered. The play would have been perfectly legitimate on those grounds. But, no Pitt man touched the ball at all, and the officials ruled that Sims had it in his possession and control, fumbling thereafter, whereupon Wilton picked the oval up from the ground to score his touchdown. Sims did not have the ball in his possession and control. 10,000 eyes will attest that fact. Under the rules, when the ball is passed forward and touched by a member of the passer's side, no other player of his side can recover until it has been touched by the opposition." The referee, Bob Evans, was a former coach of the Stanford eleven.

Jock Sutherland was gracious in defeat: "Naturally, I want to pay a compliment to old 'Pop' and his fine team. He had his lads just right for this game, and they withstood the grueling battle in great shape.... Stanford outplayed us, and earned the decision."

The Pitt starting lineup for the Rose Bowl game was Joe Donchess (left end), William Kern (left tackle), Alex Fox (left guard), Andrew Cutler (center), John Roberts (right guard), Chester Wasmuth (right tackle), Albert Guarino (right end), Paul Fisher (quarterback), Gibby Welch (left halfback), James Hagan (right halfback) and Allan Booth (fullback). Substitutes appearing in the game for Pitt were Ray Montgomery, Andrew Salata, Tom Parkinson, Richard Goldberg, Mike Getto, Felix Demoise, Charles Edwards, Dwight Fyock, Philip Sargeant, Toby Uansa, Walter Hoban and Chester Doverspike.

Following the game, the Panthers were treated to a banquet by the Southern California Pitt Alumni Club. On Tuesday they toured the motion picture studios and met movie stars – Douglas Fairbanks, Rod La Roque, Billy Dove, Jack Munhall and Lon Chaney. On Wednesday the team visited Catalina Island and were hosted by William Wrigley, Jr. Thursday was spent in the Bay area checking out Stanford and Cal-Berkeley before lunch at the Palace Hotel sponsored by the Stanford Club of Frisco. The Frisco Press Club supplied the dinner and entertainment and then the team hopped on a ferry to Oakland to board the homeward bound train. The route east allowed for stops at Salt Lake City, Denver and Chicago. "The entire round trip was an unforgettable experience for all these boys, many of whom have never again had the opportunity of traveling west."

== Scoring summary ==
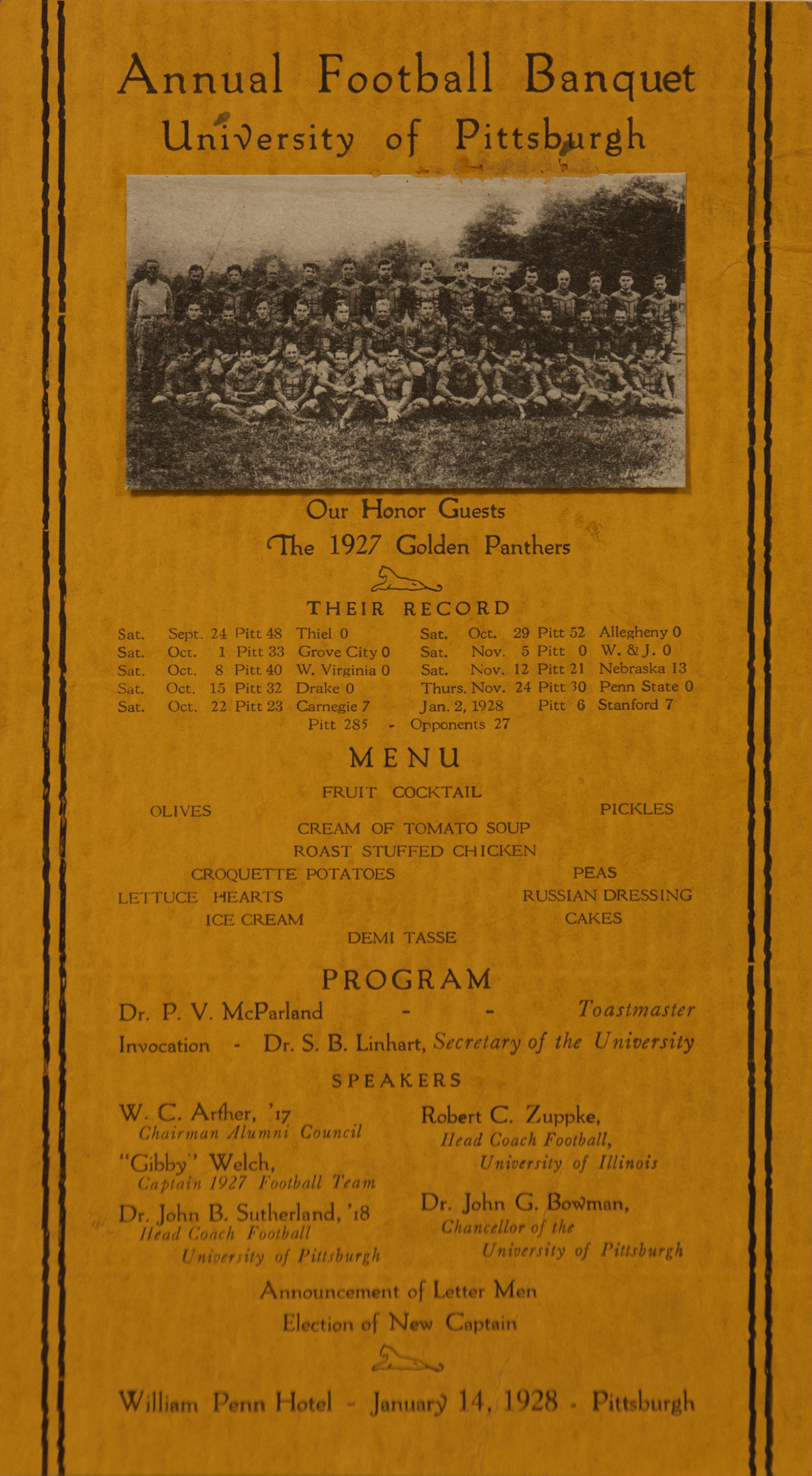
Program and menu for January 11, 1928 annual football banquet

1927 Pittsburgh Panthers scoring summary
Player	Touchdowns	Extra points	Field goals	Safety	Points
Allan A. Booth	10	18	1	0	81
Gilbert Welch	11	0	0	0	66
James Hagan	6	0	0	1	38
Tom Parkinson	5	0	0	0	30
Toby Uansa	2	2	0	0	14
Walter Hoban	2	1	0	0	13
Felix Wilps	1	1	0	0	7
Lester Cohen	1	1	0	0	7
Dwight Fyock	1	0	0	0	6
Albert Guarino	1	0	0	0	6
Ray Montgomry	1	0	0	0	6
Reginald Bowen	1	0	0	0	6
Charles Edwards	0	5	0	0	5
Totals	42	28	1	1	285

== Postseason ==
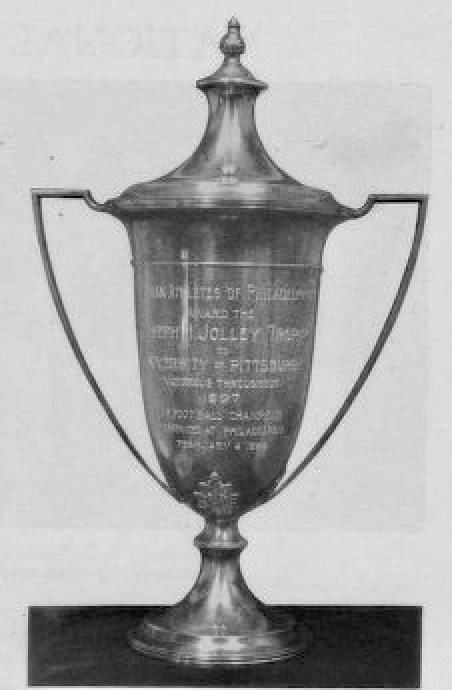
1927 Joseph H.Jolley Trophy

"The University of Illinois football team was heralded national champion of 1927, by Frank Dickinson, originator of the Dickinson football rating system. The University of Pittsburgh was named second. Minnesota third; Notre Dame fourth and Yale fifth." The Panthers were recognized as national champs by two minor polls – the Esso Gas ratings and the Veteran Athletes Body ratings.

On February 4, 1928 the Panthers were presented the Joseph H. Jolley Trophy, emblematic of the eastern football championship for 1927, from the Veteran Athletes of Philadelphia at the Penn Athletic Club in Philadelphia, Pa.

At the annual football banquet twenty-two Panthers and the student manager received their letters – Captain Gilbert Welch, Charles Edwards, William Kern, Felix Demoise, Andrew Salata, Allan Booth, John Roberts, Chester Wasmuth, Tom Parkinson, James hagan, Philip Sargeant, Richard Goldberg, Walter Hoban, Andrew Cutler, Ray Montgomery, Alex Fox, Joe Donchess, Mike Getto, Albert Guarino, Dwight Fyock, Paul Fisher, Toby Uansa and William McKee. The lettermen then elected guard Alex Fox captain for the 1928 season.

David Chester Stewart, a member of the class of 1929 in the School of Business Administration, was selected to be the 1928 varsity student football manager. The selection was made by a committee of five, made up of the Captain, the Coach, the Varsity Football Manager, the Assistant Athletic Director and the Graduate Manager.

=== All-American selections ===
Gilbert “Gibby” Welch – halfback (1st team Associated Press; 1st team International News Service by Davis Walsh; 1st team Collier's Weekly by Grantland Rice; 1st team United Press International; 1st team Walter Eckersall; 1st team Billy Evans; 1st team Hearst Papers' Consensus 1st team New York Sun)

Joe Donchess – end (2nd team Walter Eckersall; College Football Hall Of Fame)

Bill Kern – tackle (1st team Billy Evans; 2nd team International News service by Davis Walsh; 2nd team Hearst Papers' Consensus; 2nd team New York Sun)

John Roberts – guard (2nd team Walter Eckersall)

Bold = Consensus All-American
