= 1927 Villanova Wildcats football team =

American college football season

1927 Villanova Wildcats football
- Conference: Independent
- Record: 6–1
- Head coach: Harry Stuhldreher (3rd season)
- Captain: Paul Kuczo
- Home stadium: Villanova Stadium

1927 Eastern college football independents records
	Conf.			Overall
Team	W	L	T	W		L		T
Tufts		–		8	–	0	–	0
Springfield		–		7	–	0	–	2
Washington & Jefferson		–		7	–	0	–	2
No. 6 Army		–		9	–	1	–	0
No. 2 Pittsburgh		–		8	–	1	–	1
Temple		–		7	–	1	–	0
No. 5 Yale		–		7	–	1	–	0
NYU		–		7	–	1	–	2
Princeton		–		6	–	1	–	0
Villanova		–		6	–	1	–	0
Penn State		–		6	–	2	–	1
Columbia		–		5	–	2	–	2
Bucknell		–		6	–	3	–	1
Colgate		–		4	–	2	–	3
CCNY		–		4	–	2	–	2
Lafayette		–		5	–	3	–	1
Penn		–		6	–	4	–	0
Syracuse		–		5	–	3	–	2
Carnegie Tech		–		5	–	4	–	1
Boston College		–		4	–	4	–	0
Harvard		–		4	–	4	–	0
Rutgers		–		4	–	4	–	0
Cornell		–		3	–	3	–	2
Boston University		–		3	–	4	–	1
Drexel		–		3	–	5	–	1
Fordham		–		3	–	5	–	0
Brown		–		3	–	6	–	1
Vermont		–		2	–	6	–	0
Providence		–		1	–	4	–	2
Franklin & Marshall		–		1	–	7	–	1
Lehigh		–		1	–	7	–	1
Rankings from Dickinson System

The 1927 Villanova Wildcats football team represented the Villanova University during the 1927 college football season. The head coach was Harry Stuhldreher, coaching his third season with the Wildcats. The team played their home games at Villanova Stadium in Villanova, Pennsylvania.

== Schedule ==
Date	Opponent	Site	Result	Attendance	Source
October 1	at Loyola (MD)	Baltimore, MD	W 20–0		
October 8	Lebanon Valley	Villanova Stadium; Villanova, PA	W 32–7		
October 15	vs. Bucknell	Brooks Field; Scranton, PA	L 12–28	15,000	
October 22	Lehigh	Franklin Field; Philadelphia, PA	W 54–0		
October 29	John Carroll	Villanova Stadium; Villanova, PA	W 20–7		
November 5	at Boston College	Braves Field; Boston, MA	W 13–7		
November 19	Canisius	Villanova Stadium; Villanova, PA	W 30–7	10,000	
