= 1927 Holy Cross Crusaders football team =

American college football season

1927 Holy Cross Crusaders football
- Conference: Independent
- Record: 6–3
- Head coach: Cleo A. O'Donnell (9th season)
- Home stadium: Fitton Field

1927 Eastern college football independents records
	Conf.			Overall
Team	W	L	T	W		L		T
Tufts		–		8	–	0	–	0
Springfield		–		7	–	0	–	2
Washington & Jefferson		–		7	–	0	–	2
No. 6 Army		–		9	–	1	–	0
No. 2 Pittsburgh		–		8	–	1	–	1
Temple		–		7	–	1	–	0
No. 5 Yale		–		7	–	1	–	0
NYU		–		7	–	1	–	2
Princeton		–		6	–	1	–	0
Villanova		–		6	–	1	–	0
Penn State		–		6	–	2	–	1
Columbia		–		5	–	2	–	2
Bucknell		–		6	–	3	–	1
Colgate		–		4	–	2	–	3
CCNY		–		4	–	2	–	2
Lafayette		–		5	–	3	–	1
Penn		–		6	–	4	–	0
Syracuse		–		5	–	3	–	2
Carnegie Tech		–		5	–	4	–	1
Boston College		–		4	–	4	–	0
Harvard		–		4	–	4	–	0
Rutgers		–		4	–	4	–	0
Cornell		–		3	–	3	–	2
Boston University		–		3	–	4	–	1
Drexel		–		3	–	5	–	1
Fordham		–		3	–	5	–	0
Brown		–		3	–	6	–	1
Vermont		–		2	–	6	–	0
Providence		–		1	–	4	–	2
Franklin & Marshall		–		1	–	7	–	1
Lehigh		–		1	–	7	–	1
Rankings from Dickinson System

The 1927 Holy Cross Crusaders football team was an American football team that represented the College of the Holy Cross as an independent during the 1927 college football season. In its ninth season under head coach Cleo A. O'Donnell, the team compiled a 6–3 record. The team played its home games at Fitton Field in Worcester, Massachusetts.

== Schedule ==
Date	Opponent	Site	Result	Attendance	Source
October 1	St. John's	Fitton Field; Worcester, MA	W 7–0		
October 8	Dayton	Fitton Field; Worcester, MA	W 18–0	5,000	
October 15	Harvard	Harvard Stadium; Boston, MA	L 6–14		
October 22	Catholic University	Fitton Field; Worcester, MA	W 23–8		
October 29	Rutgers	Fitton Field; Worcester, MA	W 39–0		
November 5	vs. Fordham	Polo Grounds; New York, NY	W 7–2		
November 12	at Marquette	Marquette Stadium; Milwaukee, WI	L 6–12	10,000	
November 19	Boston University	Fitton Field; Worcester, MA	W 19–0		
November 26	vs. Boston College	Braves Field; Boston, MA (rivalry)	L 0–6	40,000	
