= Cleo A. O'Donnell =

American football player and coach (1883–1953)

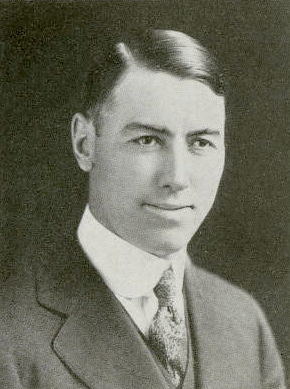
- O'Donnell pictured in Debris 1917, Purdue yearbook

Biographical details
- Born: December 10, 1883
- Died: February 15, 1953 (aged 69); Southbridge, Massachusetts, U.S.

Playing career
- 1904–1907: Holy Cross

Coaching career (HC unless noted)
- 1909–1915: Everett HS (MA)
- 1916–1917: Purdue
- 1918: Somerville HS (MA)
- 1919–1929: Holy Cross
- 1935–1940: Saint Anselm
- 1943–1944: Marlborough HS (MA)
- 1945: Fitchburg HS (MA)

Administrative career (AD unless noted)
- 1918–1919: Somerville HS (MA)
- 1926–1933: Holy Cross
- 1935–1941: Saint Anselm

Head coaching record
- Overall: 102–46–9 (college); 68–8–6 (high school)

Cleo Albert O'Donnell (December 10, 1883 – February 15, 1953) was an American football player and coach. He played college football at Holy Cross from 1904 to 1907. He was a football coach at Everett High School (1909–1915), Purdue University (1916–1917), Holy Cross (1919–1930) and Saint Anselm College (1935–1940). His 1914 Everett team has been ranked as the greatest high school football team of all time, finishing with a 13–0 record and outscoring opponents 600 to 0. In 11 years as the head coach at Holy Cross, his teams compiled a record of 69–27–6. O'Donnell has been inducted into the Holy Cross and Saint Anselm Halls of Fame.

== Playing career ==
A native of Charlestown, Massachusetts, O'Donnell attended the Boston Latin School before enrolling at the College of the Holy Cross in 1904. He played four years for the Holy Cross Crusaders football team. He was a tackle in the 1904 and 1905 seasons, and end in 1906, and a fullback in 1907. In the final game of the 1906 season, played at the Polo Grounds, O'Donnell scored both of Holy Cross's touchdowns in a 15–6 win over Fordham. He was selected by his teammates as captain of the 1907 team. His final game for Holy Cross was a 34–0 loss to Fordham. Despite the one-sided game, The New York Times singled out "O'Donnell's Pretty Play" as the feature of the contest. The Times wrote:

Again and again by the sheer force of his phenomenal running O'Donnell took the ball through the Fordham line and gained a dozen first downs. In fact, not once during the whole progress of the game was the remarkable back stopped for a loss, but, unsupported as he was, the herculean task of beating a well-drilled eleven was too much for him. ... Several stretches of thirty yards were made by his rushing, but eventually Holy Cross was forced to kick, and their advances ended there.

== Coaching ==
O'Donnell graduated from Holy Cross in 1908. In September 1909, he was hired as the football coach at Everett High School, Everett, Massachusetts. He served as the head coach at Everett for seven years from 1909 to 1915. His teams won championships in five of the seven seasons that O'Donnell was the coach. In 13 games, O'Donnell's 1914 Everett team went 13–0 and outscored opponents 600 to 0. In the national championship of high school football, Everett, the best team in the East, was matched against Oak Park High School from Illinois, the best team in the West. Everett defeated Oak Park 80 to 0. The Boston Evening Transcript wrote at the time, "Since Cleo O'Donnell took charge of the Suburban League school's athletics, he has had remarkable success, but this year's team is his masterpiece." Seventy years later, Sports Illustrated published a feature story on the 1914 Everett team, declaring it possibly the greatest high school football team of all time. O'Donnell became known for the stylish suits he wore on the sidelines at Everett and developed a reputation as "a demanding perfectionist." As the coach at Everett, O'Donnell compiled a record of 68–8–6, and through one stretch between 1913 and 1915 his team shut out all opponents in 25 consecutive games.

In March 1916, O'Donnell was hired as the head football coach at Purdue University. In two seasons as the coach at Purdue, his teams lost eight out of nine games against Western Conference opponents and compiled an overall record of 5–8–1.

In September 1918, O'Donnell became director of athletics and head football coach at Somerville High School in Somerville, Massachusetts. In August 1919 he returned his alma mater as the graduate manager of athletics and head football coach of the Holy Cross Crusaders. He remained the head coach at Holy Cross from 1919 through 1929. In his 11 years at Holy Cross, his teams posted a combined record of 69–27–6. He never had a losing season at Holy Cross, and his 1923 team outscored opponents 272 to 29. In 1926, O'Donnell became the school's first athletic director. In early 1930, O'Donnell stepped down as head football coach at Holy Cross, but remained at the school as athletic director until December 1933. After leaving Holy Cross, O'Donnell went into the restaurant business.

In April 1935, O'Donnell was hired as the head football coach and athletic director at Saint Anselm College in Goffstown, New Hampshire. O'Donnell was the head coach at Saint Anselm for six seasons from 1935 to 1940. In January 1941, O'Donnell resigned his position at Saint Anselm.

In 1943 and 1944, O'Donnell coached Marlborough High School while head coach Ed Sullivan was serving in the military. In 1944 he led the team to an undefeated season and a Class C Championship. The following year he coached Fitchburg High School as a military substitute for Marty McDonough.

== Personal life ==
O'Donnell and his wife Alice Guerin had three sons and two daughters. All of his sons also had athletic careers. Cleo Jr. was the captain of the 1946 Harvard Crimson football team. Kenneth was captain of the 1948 Harvard Crimson football team and an aide to President John F Kennedy. Warren played fullback for Holy Cross. He was shot thwarting a robbery attempt in 1971 and used a wheelchair until his death in 1976.

== Later life ==
After retiring from coaching, O'Donnell operated a tile manufacturing company in Worcester, Massachusetts. On February 14, 1953, O'Donnell collapsed and died suddenly while attending a testimonial dinner for his former pupil, Harry McMahon, at Southbridge, Massachusetts.

== Honors ==
O'Donnell was inducted into the Holy Cross Athletics Hall of Fame in 1962. He was also inducted into Saint Anselm College's Anselmian Athletic Club Hall of Fame in 1985.

== Head coaching record ==
=== College ===
Year	Team	Overall	Conference	Standing	Bowl/playoffs
Purdue Boilermakers football (Western Conference / Big Ten Conference) (1916–1917)
1916	Purdue	2–4–1	0–4–1	T–8th	
1917	Purdue	3–4	0–4	T–8th	
Purdue:		5–8–1	0–8–1		
Holy Cross Crusaders (Independent) (1919–1929)
1919	Holy Cross	5–3			
1920	Holy Cross	5–3			
1921	Holy Cross	5–3			
1922	Holy Cross	7–2–1			
1923	Holy Cross	8–2			
1924	Holy Cross	7–1–1			
1925	Holy Cross	8–2			
1926	Holy Cross	7–1–2			
1927	Holy Cross	6–3			
1928	Holy Cross	5–3–2			
1929	Holy Cross	6–4			
Holy Cross:		69–27–6			
Saint Anselm Hawks (Independent) (1935–1940)
1935	Saint Anselm	2–3			
1936	Saint Anselm	6–0–1			
1937	Saint Anselm	5–2			
1938	Saint Anselm	6–0–1			
1939	Saint Anselm	4–2			
1940	Saint Anselm	5–4			
Saint Anselm:		28–11–2			
Total:		102–46–9			
