= 1928 Holy Cross Crusaders football team =

American college football season

1928 Holy Cross Crusaders football
- Conference: Independent
- Record: 5–3–2
- Head coach: Cleo A. O'Donnell (10th season)
- Captain: Richard Phelan
- Home stadium: Fitton Field

1928 Eastern college football independents records
	Conf.			Overall
Team	W	L	T	W		L		T
Boston College		–		9	–	0	–	0
West Chester		–		8	–	0	–	0
Villanova		–		7	–	0	–	1
Brown		–		8	–	1	–	0
No. 11 Penn		–		8	–	1	–	0
No. 6 Carnegie Tech		–		7	–	1	–	0
No. 9 Army		–		8	–	2	–	0
Drexel		–		8	–	2	–	0
No. 10 NYU		–		8	–	2	–	0
Temple		–		7	–	1	–	2
Lafayette		–		6	–	1	–	2
Princeton		–		5	–	1	–	2
CCNY		–		4	–	1	–	2
Pittsburgh		–		6	–	2	–	1
Harvard		–		5	–	2	–	1
Tufts		–		5	–	2	–	1
Colgate		–		6	–	3	–	0
Rutgers		–		6	–	3	–	0
Bucknell		–		5	–	2	–	3
Columbia		–		5	–	3	–	1
Boston University		–		3	–	3	–	2
Cornell		–		3	–	3	–	2
Syracuse		–		4	–	4	–	1
Yale		–		4	–	4	–	0
Fordham		–		4	–	5	–	0
Franklin & Marshall		–		4	–	5	–	0
Penn State		–		3	–	5	–	1
Lehigh		–		3	–	6	–	0
Washington & Jefferson		–		2	–	5	–	2
Providence		–		1	–	5	–	3
Vermont		–		1	–	7	–	2
Rankings from Dickinson System

The 1928 Holy Cross Crusaders football team was an American football team that represented the College of the Holy Cross as an independent during the 1928 college football season. In its tenth season under head coach Cleo A. O'Donnell, the team compiled a 5–3–2 record. The team played its home games at Fitton Field in Worcester, Massachusetts.

== Schedule ==
Date	Opponent	Site	Result	Attendance	Source
September 29	Newport Naval	Fitton Field; Worcester, MA	W 12–0		
October 6	St. John's	Fitton Field; Worcester, MA	W 44–0		
October 13	at Rutgers	Newark School Stadium; Newark, NJ	W 46–0		
October 20	Fordham	Fitton Field; Worcester, MA	L 13–19		
October 27	Marquette	Fitton Field; Worcester, MA	T 6–6	10,000	
November 3	at Brown	Brown Stadium; Providence, RI	L 0–6		
November 10	Boston University	Fitton Field; Worcester, MA	W 15–0		
November 17	at Harvard	Harvard Stadium; Boston, MA	T 0–0		
November 24	Providence College	Fitton Field; Worcester, MA	W 44–0		
December 1	at Boston College	Fenway Park; Boston, MA (rivalry)	L 0–19	35,000	
