= 1927 Boston University Terriers football team =

American college football season

1927 Boston University Terriers football
- Conference: Independent
- Record: 3–4–1
- Head coach: Reggie Brown & Edward N. Robinson (2nd season)
- Home stadium: Melrose Athletic Field, Tufts Oval

1927 Eastern college football independents records
	Conf.			Overall
Team	W	L	T	W		L		T
Tufts		–		8	–	0	–	0
Springfield		–		7	–	0	–	2
Washington & Jefferson		–		7	–	0	–	2
No. 6 Army		–		9	–	1	–	0
No. 2 Pittsburgh		–		8	–	1	–	1
Temple		–		7	–	1	–	0
No. 5 Yale		–		7	–	1	–	0
NYU		–		7	–	1	–	2
Princeton		–		6	–	1	–	0
Villanova		–		6	–	1	–	0
Penn State		–		6	–	2	–	1
Columbia		–		5	–	2	–	2
Bucknell		–		6	–	3	–	1
Colgate		–		4	–	2	–	3
CCNY		–		4	–	2	–	2
Lafayette		–		5	–	3	–	1
Penn		–		6	–	4	–	0
Syracuse		–		5	–	3	–	2
Carnegie Tech		–		5	–	4	–	1
Boston College		–		4	–	4	–	0
Harvard		–		4	–	4	–	0
Rutgers		–		4	–	4	–	0
Cornell		–		3	–	3	–	2
Boston University		–		3	–	4	–	1
Drexel		–		3	–	5	–	1
Fordham		–		3	–	5	–	0
Brown		–		3	–	6	–	1
Vermont		–		2	–	6	–	0
Providence		–		1	–	4	–	2
Franklin & Marshall		–		1	–	7	–	1
Lehigh		–		1	–	7	–	1
Rankings from Dickinson System

The 1927 Boston University Terriers football team was an American football team that represented Boston University as an independent during the 1927 college football season. In its second season under head coaches Reggie Brown and Edward N. Robinson, the team compiled a 3–4–1 record and outscored opponents by a total of 65 to 53.

== Schedule ==
Date	Time	Opponent	Site	Result	Attendance	Source
September 24		at Army	Michie Stadium; West Point, NY	L 0–13		
October 8	2:30 p.m.	Colby	Melrose Athletic Field; Melrose, MA	W 13–0		
October 15		at Bates	Lewiston, ME	T 0–0		
October 22		at Springfield	Pratt Field; Springfield, MA	L 0–6	5,500	
October 29	2:00 p.m.	at Tufts	Tufts Oval; Medford, MA	L 6–9		
November 5	2:00 p.m.	Providence College	Tufts Oval; Medford, MA	W 33–6		
November 12	2:00 p.m.	St. John's	Melrose Athletic Field; Melrose, MA	W 13–0		
November 19		at Holy Cross	Fitton Field; Worcester, MA	L 0–19		
All times are in Eastern time
