= 1927 Boston College Eagles football team =

American college football season

1927 Boston College Eagles football
- Conference: Independent
- Record: 4–4
- Head coach: D. Leo Daley (1st season)
- Captain: Tom O'Brien
- Home stadium: Braves Field

1927 Eastern college football independents records
	Conf.			Overall
Team	W	L	T	W		L		T
Tufts		–		8	–	0	–	0
Springfield		–		7	–	0	–	2
Washington & Jefferson		–		7	–	0	–	2
No. 6 Army		–		9	–	1	–	0
No. 2 Pittsburgh		–		8	–	1	–	1
Temple		–		7	–	1	–	0
No. 5 Yale		–		7	–	1	–	0
NYU		–		7	–	1	–	2
Princeton		–		6	–	1	–	0
Villanova		–		6	–	1	–	0
Penn State		–		6	–	2	–	1
Columbia		–		5	–	2	–	2
Bucknell		–		6	–	3	–	1
Colgate		–		4	–	2	–	3
CCNY		–		4	–	2	–	2
Lafayette		–		5	–	3	–	1
Penn		–		6	–	4	–	0
Syracuse		–		5	–	3	–	2
Carnegie Tech		–		5	–	4	–	1
Boston College		–		4	–	4	–	0
Harvard		–		4	–	4	–	0
Rutgers		–		4	–	4	–	0
Cornell		–		3	–	3	–	2
Boston University		–		3	–	4	–	1
Drexel		–		3	–	5	–	1
Fordham		–		3	–	5	–	0
Brown		–		3	–	6	–	1
Vermont		–		2	–	6	–	0
Providence		–		1	–	4	–	2
Franklin & Marshall		–		1	–	7	–	1
Lehigh		–		1	–	7	–	1
Rankings from Dickinson System

The 1927 Boston College Eagles football team represented Boston College as an independent during the 1927 college football season. Led by D. Leo Daley in his first and only season as head coach, Boston College compiled a record of 4–4.

== Schedule ==
Date	Time	Opponent	Site	Result	Attendance	Source
October 1	2:30 p.m.	Duke	Fenway Park; Boston, MA	L 9–25		
October 12		Geneva	Braves Field; Boston, MA	L 0–13	18,000	
October 22	2:00 p.m.	West Virginia Wesleyan	Braves Field; Boston, MA	W 33–0		
October 29		at Fordham	Polo Grounds; New York, NY	W 27–7	8,000	
November 5		Villanova	Braves Field; Boston, MA	L 7–13		
November 12		Georgetown	Braves Field; Boston, MA	L 0–47		
November 19		at Connecticut	Gardner Dow Athletic Fields; Storrs, CT	W 19–0		
November 26		Holy Cross	Braves Field; Boston, MA (rivalry)	W 6–0	40,000	
All times are in Eastern time
