= 1927 Harvard Crimson football team =

American college football season

1927 Harvard Crimson football
- Conference: Independent
- Record: 4–4
- Head coach: Arnold Horween (2nd season)
- Captain: Charles A. Pratt Jr.
- Home stadium: Harvard Stadium

1927 Eastern college football independents records
	Conf.			Overall
Team	W	L	T	W		L		T
Tufts		–		8	–	0	–	0
Springfield		–		7	–	0	–	2
Washington & Jefferson		–		7	–	0	–	2
No. 6 Army		–		9	–	1	–	0
No. 2 Pittsburgh		–		8	–	1	–	1
Temple		–		7	–	1	–	0
No. 5 Yale		–		7	–	1	–	0
NYU		–		7	–	1	–	2
Princeton		–		6	–	1	–	0
Villanova		–		6	–	1	–	0
Penn State		–		6	–	2	–	1
Columbia		–		5	–	2	–	2
Bucknell		–		6	–	3	–	1
Colgate		–		4	–	2	–	3
CCNY		–		4	–	2	–	2
Lafayette		–		5	–	3	–	1
Penn		–		6	–	4	–	0
Syracuse		–		5	–	3	–	2
Carnegie Tech		–		5	–	4	–	1
Boston College		–		4	–	4	–	0
Harvard		–		4	–	4	–	0
Rutgers		–		4	–	4	–	0
Cornell		–		3	–	3	–	2
Boston University		–		3	–	4	–	1
Drexel		–		3	–	5	–	1
Fordham		–		3	–	5	–	0
Brown		–		3	–	6	–	1
Vermont		–		2	–	6	–	0
Providence		–		1	–	4	–	2
Franklin & Marshall		–		1	–	7	–	1
Lehigh		–		1	–	7	–	1
Rankings from Dickinson System

The 1927 Harvard Crimson football team represented Harvard University as an independent during the 1927 college football season. In its second season under head coach Arnold Horween, Harvard compiled a 4–4 record and was outscored by a total of 108 to 85. Charles A. Pratt Jr. was the team captain. The team played its home games at Harvard Stadium in Boston.

== Schedule ==
Date	Opponent	Site	Result	Source
October 1	Vermont	Harvard Stadium; Boston, MA	W 21–3	
October 8	Purdue	Harvard Stadium; Boston, MA	L 0–19	
October 15	Holy Cross	Harvard Stadium; Boston, MA	W 14–6	
October 22	Dartmouth	Harvard Stadium; Boston, MA (rivalry)	L 6–30	
October 29	Indiana	Harvard Stadium; Boston, MA	W 26–6	
November 5	at Penn	Franklin Field; Philadelphia, PA	L 0–24	
November 12	Brown	Harvard Stadium; Boston, MA	W 18–6	
November 19	Yale	Harvard Stadium; Boston, MA (rivalry)	L 0–14	
