= 1927 Fordham Maroon football team =

American college football season

1927 Fordham Maroon football
- Conference: Independent
- Record: 3–5
- Head coach: Frank Cavanaugh (1st season)
- Captain: William Feaster
- Home stadium: Fordham Field

1927 Eastern college football independents records
	Conf.			Overall
Team	W	L	T	W		L		T
Tufts		–		8	–	0	–	0
Springfield		–		7	–	0	–	2
Washington & Jefferson		–		7	–	0	–	2
No. 6 Army		–		9	–	1	–	0
No. 2 Pittsburgh		–		8	–	1	–	1
Temple		–		7	–	1	–	0
No. 5 Yale		–		7	–	1	–	0
NYU		–		7	–	1	–	2
Princeton		–		6	–	1	–	0
Villanova		–		6	–	1	–	0
Penn State		–		6	–	2	–	1
Columbia		–		5	–	2	–	2
Bucknell		–		6	–	3	–	1
Colgate		–		4	–	2	–	3
CCNY		–		4	–	2	–	2
Lafayette		–		5	–	3	–	1
Penn		–		6	–	4	–	0
Syracuse		–		5	–	3	–	2
Carnegie Tech		–		5	–	4	–	1
Boston College		–		4	–	4	–	0
Harvard		–		4	–	4	–	0
Rutgers		–		4	–	4	–	0
Cornell		–		3	–	3	–	2
Boston University		–		3	–	4	–	1
Drexel		–		3	–	5	–	1
Fordham		–		3	–	5	–	0
Brown		–		3	–	6	–	1
Vermont		–		2	–	6	–	0
Providence		–		1	–	4	–	2
Franklin & Marshall		–		1	–	7	–	1
Lehigh		–		1	–	7	–	1
Rankings from Dickinson System

The 1927 Fordham Maroon football team was an American football team that represented Fordham University as an independent during the 1927 college football season. In its first year under head coach Frank Cavanaugh, Fordham compiled a 3–5 record and outscored opponents by a total of 139 to 82. He hired Tony Comerford as an assistant coach, who had worked with him in that capacity in the prior year for Boston College. William Feaster was the team captain.

== Schedule ==
Date	Opponent	Site	Result	Attendance	Source
September 24	Bethany (WV)	Fordham Field; Bronx, NY	W 34–0	5,000	
October 1	Lebanon Valley	Fordham Field; Bronx, NY	W 13–3		
October 15	vs. NYU	Yankee Stadium; Bronx, NY	L 0–32	43,000	
October 22	at George Washington	Central High Stadium; Washington, DC	L 0–13	6,000	
October 29	Boston College	Polo Grounds; New York, NY	L 7–27	8,000	
November 5	Holy Cross	Polo Grounds; New York, NY	L 2–7	1,500	
November 12	at Providence College	Hendricken Field; Providence, RI	W 26–19		
November 19	Georgetown	Polo Grounds; New York, NY	L 0–38	15,000	
