= 1927 Rutgers Queensmen football team =

American college football season

1927 Rutgers Queensmen football
- Conference: Independent
- Record: 4–4
- Head coach: Harry Rockafeller (1st season)
- Captain: Herbert E. Lorenz
- Home stadium: Neilson Field

1927 Eastern college football independents records
	Conf.			Overall
Team	W	L	T	W		L		T
Tufts		–		8	–	0	–	0
Springfield		–		7	–	0	–	2
Washington & Jefferson		–		7	–	0	–	2
No. 6 Army		–		9	–	1	–	0
No. 2 Pittsburgh		–		8	–	1	–	1
Temple		–		7	–	1	–	0
No. 5 Yale		–		7	–	1	–	0
NYU		–		7	–	1	–	2
Princeton		–		6	–	1	–	0
Villanova		–		6	–	1	–	0
Penn State		–		6	–	2	–	1
Columbia		–		5	–	2	–	2
Bucknell		–		6	–	3	–	1
Colgate		–		4	–	2	–	3
CCNY		–		4	–	2	–	2
Lafayette		–		5	–	3	–	1
Penn		–		6	–	4	–	0
Syracuse		–		5	–	3	–	2
Carnegie Tech		–		5	–	4	–	1
Boston College		–		4	–	4	–	0
Harvard		–		4	–	4	–	0
Rutgers		–		4	–	4	–	0
Cornell		–		3	–	3	–	2
Boston University		–		3	–	4	–	1
Drexel		–		3	–	5	–	1
Fordham		–		3	–	5	–	0
Brown		–		3	–	6	–	1
Vermont		–		2	–	6	–	0
Providence		–		1	–	4	–	2
Franklin & Marshall		–		1	–	7	–	1
Lehigh		–		1	–	7	–	1
Rankings from Dickinson System

The 1927 Rutgers Queensmen football team represented Rutgers University as an independent during the 1927 college football season. In their first season under head coach Harry Rockafeller, the Queensmen compiled a 4–4 record and were outscored by their opponents, 179 to 103.

== Schedule ==
Date	Opponent	Site	Result	Source
October 1	Manhattan	Neilson Field; New Brunswick, NJ	W 24–6	
October 8	at Lafayette	Fisher Field; Easton, PA	L 0–56	
October 15	George Washington	Neilson Field; New Brunswick, NJ	L 0–6	
October 22	at NYU	Yankee Stadium; Bronx, NY	L 6–60	
October 29	at Holy Cross	Fitton Field; Worcester, MA	L 0–39	
November 5	Alfred	Neilson Field; New Brunswick, NJ	W 42–0	
November 12	Lehigh	Neilson Field; New Brunswick, NJ	W 19–6	
November 19	at Swarthmore	Clothier Field Stadium; Swarthmore, PA	W 12–6	
