= 1927 Princeton Tigers football team =

American college football season

1927 Princeton Tigers football
- Conference: Independent
- Record: 6–1
- Head coach: Bill Roper (14th season)
- Captain: Charles R. Moeser
- Home stadium: Palmer Stadium

1927 Eastern college football independents records
	Conf.			Overall
Team	W	L	T	W		L		T
Tufts		–		8	–	0	–	0
Springfield		–		7	–	0	–	2
Washington & Jefferson		–		7	–	0	–	2
No. 6 Army		–		9	–	1	–	0
No. 2 Pittsburgh		–		8	–	1	–	1
Temple		–		7	–	1	–	0
No. 5 Yale		–		7	–	1	–	0
NYU		–		7	–	1	–	2
Princeton		–		6	–	1	–	0
Villanova		–		6	–	1	–	0
Penn State		–		6	–	2	–	1
Columbia		–		5	–	2	–	2
Bucknell		–		6	–	3	–	1
Colgate		–		4	–	2	–	3
CCNY		–		4	–	2	–	2
Lafayette		–		5	–	3	–	1
Penn		–		6	–	4	–	0
Syracuse		–		5	–	3	–	2
Carnegie Tech		–		5	–	4	–	1
Boston College		–		4	–	4	–	0
Harvard		–		4	–	4	–	0
Rutgers		–		4	–	4	–	0
Cornell		–		3	–	3	–	2
Boston University		–		3	–	4	–	1
Drexel		–		3	–	5	–	1
Fordham		–		3	–	5	–	0
Brown		–		3	–	6	–	1
Vermont		–		2	–	6	–	0
Providence		–		1	–	4	–	2
Franklin & Marshall		–		1	–	7	–	1
Lehigh		–		1	–	7	–	1
Rankings from Dickinson System

The 1927 Princeton Tigers football team represented Princeton University in the 1927 college football season. The team finished with a 6–1 record under 14th-year head coach Bill Roper. The Tigers outscored opponents by a combined total of 151 to 31, and their sole loss was in the final game of the season by a 14–6 score against Yale. No Princeton were selected as first-team honorees on the 1927 College Football All-America Team.

== Schedule ==
Date	Opponent	Site	Result	Attendance	Source
October 1	Amherst	Palmer Stadium; Princeton, NJ	W 14–0		
October 8	Lehigh	Palmer Stadium; Princeton, NJ	W 42–0		
October 15	Washington and Lee	Palmer Stadium; Princeton, NJ	W 13–0		
October 22	at Cornell	Schoellkopf Field; Ithaca, NY	W 21–10	32,000	
October 29	William & Mary	Palmer Stadium; Princeton, NJ	W 35–7		
November 5	Ohio State	Palmer Stadium; Princeton, NJ	W 20–0	36,000	
November 12	at Yale	Yale Bowl; New Haven, CT (rivalry)	L 6–14	80,000	
