= 1927 Cornell Big Red football team =

American college football season

1927 Cornell Big Red football
- Conference: Independent
- Record: 3–3–2
- Head coach: Gil Dobie (8th season)
- Offensive scheme: Single-wing
- Base defense: 6–3–2
- Captain: Harold Hoekelman
- Home stadium: Schoellkopf Field

1927 Eastern college football independents records
	Conf.			Overall
Team	W	L	T	W		L		T
Tufts		–		8	–	0	–	0
Springfield		–		7	–	0	–	2
Washington & Jefferson		–		7	–	0	–	2
No. 6 Army		–		9	–	1	–	0
No. 2 Pittsburgh		–		8	–	1	–	1
Temple		–		7	–	1	–	0
No. 5 Yale		–		7	–	1	–	0
NYU		–		7	–	1	–	2
Princeton		–		6	–	1	–	0
Villanova		–		6	–	1	–	0
Penn State		–		6	–	2	–	1
Columbia		–		5	–	2	–	2
Bucknell		–		6	–	3	–	1
Colgate		–		4	–	2	–	3
CCNY		–		4	–	2	–	2
Lafayette		–		5	–	3	–	1
Penn		–		6	–	4	–	0
Syracuse		–		5	–	3	–	2
Carnegie Tech		–		5	–	4	–	1
Boston College		–		4	–	4	–	0
Harvard		–		4	–	4	–	0
Rutgers		–		4	–	4	–	0
Cornell		–		3	–	3	–	2
Boston University		–		3	–	4	–	1
Drexel		–		3	–	5	–	1
Fordham		–		3	–	5	–	0
Brown		–		3	–	6	–	1
Vermont		–		2	–	6	–	0
Providence		–		1	–	4	–	2
Franklin & Marshall		–		1	–	7	–	1
Lehigh		–		1	–	7	–	1
Rankings from Dickinson System

The 1927 Cornell Big Red football team was an American football team that represented Cornell University during the 1927 college football season. In their eighth season under head coach Gil Dobie, the Big Red compiled a 3–3–2 record and outscored all opponents by a combined total of 136 to 121.=

== Schedule ==
Date	Opponent	Site	Result	Attendance	Source
September 24	Clarkson	Schoellkopf Field; Ithaca, NY	W 41–0	2,000	
October 1	Niagara	Schoellkopf Field; Ithaca, NY	W 19–6		
October 8	Richmond	Schoellkopf Field; Ithaca, NY	W 53–0	7,000	
October 22	at Princeton	Schoellkopf Field; Ithaca, NY	L 10–21	32,000	
October 29	Columbia	Schoellkopf Field; Ithaca, NY (rivalry)	T 0–0		
November 5	St. Bonaventure	Schoellkopf Field; Ithaca, NY	T 6–6		
November 12	at Dartmouth	Memorial Field; Hanover, NH (rivalry)	L 7–53		
November 24	at Penn	Franklin Field; Philadelphia, PA (rivalry)	L 0–35		
