= John Charlesworth (American football) =

American football player (1902–1962)

Profile
- Position: Center

Personal information
- Born: October 13, 1902; Clarksburg, Massachusetts, U.S.
- Died: September 28, 1962 (aged 59); Manhattan, New York, U.S.

Career information
- College: Yale University

Career history
- 1925–1927: Yale

Awards and highlights
- National champion (1927); Consensus All-American (1927)

John Dudley Charlesworth (October 13, 1902 – September 28, 1962) was an American football player.

Charlesworth enrolled at Yale University and, while there, played on the Yale Bulldogs football team in 1925 and 1927. He was a consensus choice for the 1927 College Football All-America Team.

Charlesworth graduated from Yale in 1929. He was married and had a son, John D. Charlesworth Jr. He worked as a sales executive at the Shatz Painting Company in Manhattan. In September 1962, he died from a heart attack at his home on East 77th Street after returning home from eating out.
