= 1927 Army Cadets football team =

American college football season

1927 Army Cadets football
- Conference: Independent
- Record: 9–1
- Head coach: Biff Jones (2nd season)
- Offensive scheme: Single-wing
- Captain: Harry Wilson
- Home stadium: Michie Stadium

1927 Eastern college football independents records
	Conf.			Overall
Team	W	L	T	W		L		T
Tufts		–		8	–	0	–	0
Springfield		–		7	–	0	–	2
Washington & Jefferson		–		7	–	0	–	2
No. 6 Army		–		9	–	1	–	0
No. 2 Pittsburgh		–		8	–	1	–	1
Temple		–		7	–	1	–	0
No. 5 Yale		–		7	–	1	–	0
NYU		–		7	–	1	–	2
Princeton		–		6	–	1	–	0
Villanova		–		6	–	1	–	0
Penn State		–		6	–	2	–	1
Columbia		–		5	–	2	–	2
Bucknell		–		6	–	3	–	1
Colgate		–		4	–	2	–	3
CCNY		–		4	–	2	–	2
Lafayette		–		5	–	3	–	1
Penn		–		6	–	4	–	0
Syracuse		–		5	–	3	–	2
Carnegie Tech		–		5	–	4	–	1
Boston College		–		4	–	4	–	0
Harvard		–		4	–	4	–	0
Rutgers		–		4	–	4	–	0
Cornell		–		3	–	3	–	2
Boston University		–		3	–	4	–	1
Drexel		–		3	–	5	–	1
Fordham		–		3	–	5	–	0
Brown		–		3	–	6	–	1
Vermont		–		2	–	6	–	0
Providence		–		1	–	4	–	2
Franklin & Marshall		–		1	–	7	–	1
Lehigh		–		1	–	7	–	1
Rankings from Dickinson System

The 1927 Army Cadets football team represented the United States Military Academy as an independent during the 1927 college football season. In their second season under head coach Biff Jones, the Cadets compiled a 9–1 record, shut out six of their ten opponents, and outscored all opponents by a combined total of 197 to 37. In the annual Army–Navy Game, the Cadets defeated the Midshipmen 14–9. The team's only loss came to national champion Yale by a 10 to 6 score. The team was ranked No. 6 in the nation in the Dickinson System ratings released in December 1927.

Four Army players were recognized on the All-America team. Halfback Red Cagle was a consensus first-team honoree and was later inducted into the College Football Hall of Fame. Tackle Bud Sprague was selected as a first-team honoree by the Associated Press (AP), the International News Service (INS), and the Central Press Association (CP). End Charles Born was selected as a second-team honoree by the United Press (UP), Hearst newspapers, New York Sun, and Billy Evans. Tackle George Perry was selected as a first-team honoree by the New York Sun.

Harry Wilson served as the team's captain, having been elected in November 1926 aboard the team's return train from the 1926 Army–Navy Game in Chicago.

== Schedule ==
Date	Opponent	Site	Result	Attendance	Source
September 24	Boston University	Michie Stadium; West Point, NY	W 13–0		
October 1	Detroit	Michie Stadium; West Point, NY	W 6–0		
October 8	Marquette	Michie Stadium; West Point, NY	W 21–12		
October 15	Davis & Elkins	Michie Stadium; West Point, NY	W 27–6		
October 22	at Yale	Yale Bowl; New Haven, CT	L 6–10	78,000	
October 29	Bucknell	Michie Stadium; West Point, NY	W 34–0		
November 5	Franklin & Marshall	Michie Stadium; West Point, NY	W 45–0		
November 12	vs. Notre Dame	Yankee Stadium; Bronx, NY (rivalry)	W 18–0	65,678	
November 19	Ursinus	Michie Stadium; West Point, NY	W 13–0		
November 26	vs. Navy	Polo Grounds; New York, NY (Army–Navy Game)	W 14–9		

== Players ==
The following players won varsity letters for their participation on the 1927 Army football team.

- Charles F. Born - end
- Samuel Brentnall - end
- Red Cagle - back (College Football Hall of Fame)
- Paul Elias
- Herbert Gibner
- William Evens Hall - center
- Louis A. Hammack - guard
- Norris B. Harbold - end
- Charles I. Humber
- Richard C. Hutchinson
- Arthur W. Meehan - back
- John H. Murrell - back
- William L. Nave
- Howard E. Pearson - center
- George W. Perry - tackle
- LaVerne G. Saunders - tackle
- Lyle Seeman - guard
- Bud Sprague - tackle (College Football Hall of Fame)
- Birrell Walsh
- Harry Wilson - captain (College Football Hall of Fame)
