= 1927 Lehigh Brown and White football team =

American college football season

1927 Lehigh Brown and White football
- Conference: Independent
- Record: 1–7–1
- Head coach: Percy Wendell (3rd season)
- Home stadium: Taylor Stadium

1927 Eastern college football independents records
	Conf.			Overall
Team	W	L	T	W		L		T
Tufts		–		8	–	0	–	0
Springfield		–		7	–	0	–	2
Washington & Jefferson		–		7	–	0	–	2
No. 6 Army		–		9	–	1	–	0
No. 2 Pittsburgh		–		8	–	1	–	1
Temple		–		7	–	1	–	0
No. 5 Yale		–		7	–	1	–	0
NYU		–		7	–	1	–	2
Princeton		–		6	–	1	–	0
Villanova		–		6	–	1	–	0
Penn State		–		6	–	2	–	1
Columbia		–		5	–	2	–	2
Bucknell		–		6	–	3	–	1
Colgate		–		4	–	2	–	3
CCNY		–		4	–	2	–	2
Lafayette		–		5	–	3	–	1
Penn		–		6	–	4	–	0
Syracuse		–		5	–	3	–	2
Carnegie Tech		–		5	–	4	–	1
Boston College		–		4	–	4	–	0
Harvard		–		4	–	4	–	0
Rutgers		–		4	–	4	–	0
Cornell		–		3	–	3	–	2
Boston University		–		3	–	4	–	1
Drexel		–		3	–	5	–	1
Fordham		–		3	–	5	–	0
Brown		–		3	–	6	–	1
Vermont		–		2	–	6	–	0
Providence		–		1	–	4	–	2
Franklin & Marshall		–		1	–	7	–	1
Lehigh		–		1	–	7	–	1
Rankings from Dickinson System

The 1927 Lehigh Brown and White football team was an American football team that represented Lehigh University as an independent during the 1927 college football season. In its third and final season under head coach Percy Wendell, the team compiled a 1–7–1 record and was outscored by a total of 196 to 31. Lehigh played home games at Taylor Stadium in Bethlehem, Pennsylvania.

== Schedule ==
Date	Opponent	Site	Result	Source
September 24	St. John's	Taylor Stadium; Bethlehem, PA	T 0–0	
October 1	Ursinus	Taylor Stadium; Bethlehem, PA	W 6–0	
October 8	at Princeton	Palmer Stadium; Princeton, NJ	L 0–42	
October 15	Swarthmore	Taylor Stadium; Bethlehem, PA	L 10–12	
October 22	at Villanova	Franklin Field; Philadelphia, PA	L 0–54	
October 29	Muhlenberg	Taylor Stadium; Bethlehem, PA	L 3–13	
November 5	Bucknell	Taylor Stadium; Bethlehem, PA	L 6–20	
November 12	at Rutgers	Neilson Field; New Brunswick, NJ	L 6–12	
November 19	Lafayette	Taylor Stadium; Bethlehem, PA (rivalry)	L 0–43	
