= 1927 college football season =

American college football season

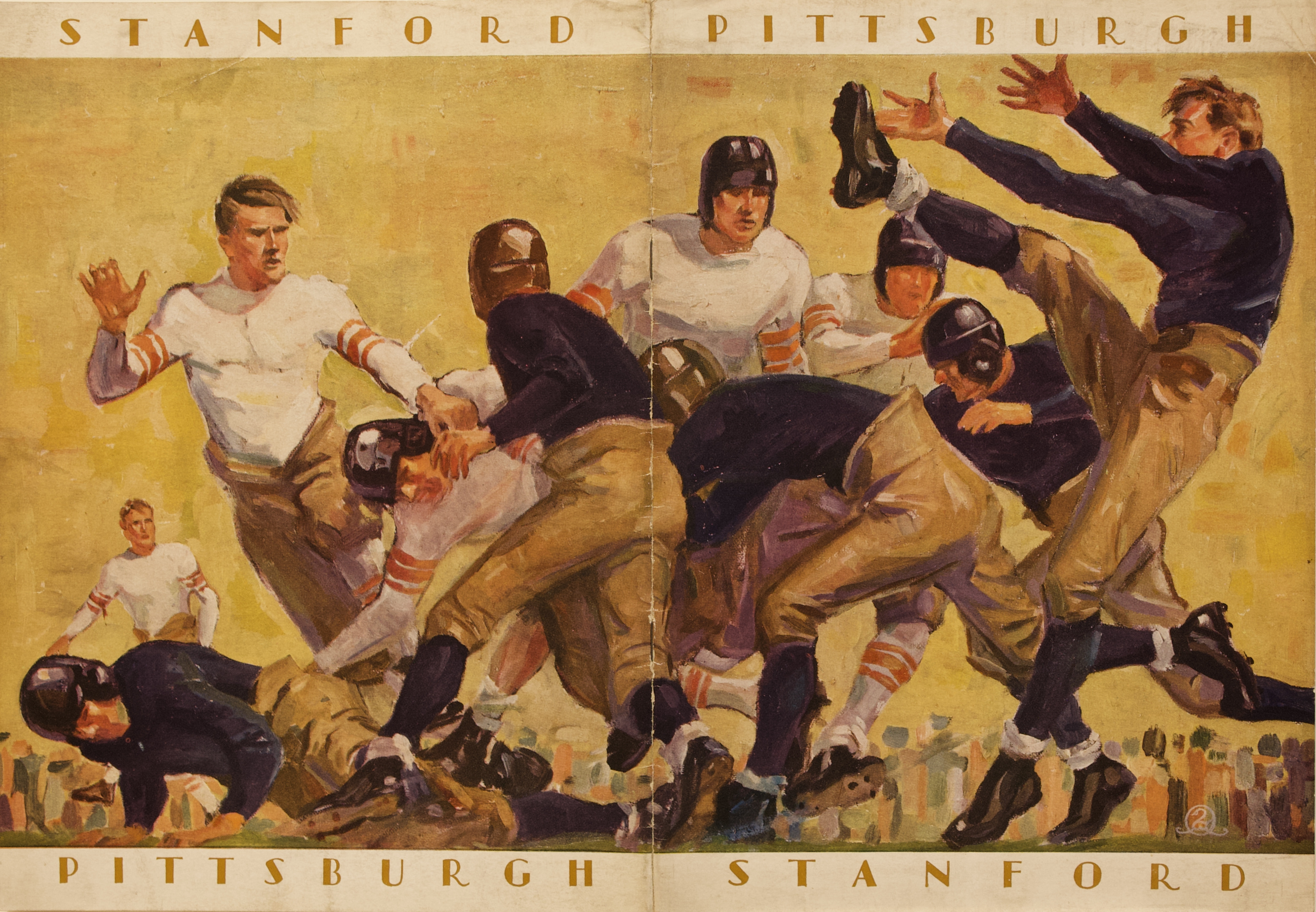
- Rose Bowl souvenir program
- Number of bowls: 1
- Bowl games: January 1, 1928
- Champion(s): Illinois (Note: per Dickinson System (awarded the Rissman Trophy), Billingsley Report, Parke H. Davis (Spalding's Official Foot Ball Guide), Helms Athletic Foundation, and National Championship Foundation); Georgia (Note: per Berryman QPRS, Boand System, Poling System) (not claimed); Notre Dame (Note: per Houlgate System) (not claimed); Texas A&M (Note: per Sagarin Ratings Elo chess method and Sagarin Ratings Predictor method); Yale (Note: per College Football Researchers Association)

The 1927 college football season ended with the Illini of the University of Illinois (7–0–1) being recognized as champion under the Dickinson System. At season's end, the Rissler Cup was awarded to the team that finished first in the "Dickinson ratings", which considered strength of schedule. In the final week, Georgia's "Dream and Wonder team" was upset by Georgia Tech. Georgia had upset Eastern power Yale 14–10. Though most selectors retrospectively named either Illinois or Georgia as their 1927 national champions, over a half-century later Jeff Sagarin, a computer-based selector, named the Texas Aggies as the No. 1 team.

In the Rose Bowl, the Pittsburgh Panthers (8–0–1) were invited to play against the Pacific Coast Conference champion. Though USC and Stanford had identical records in conference play, Stanford was given a chance to "avenge" its 7–7 tie against Alabama in the previous year's Rose Bowl. Stanford won 7–6.

== Rule changes ==
The major rules change in 1927 was the moving of the goal posts from the goal line to the end of the end zone, where they have been ever since. The move was for both safety reasons and to de-emphasize the kicking game

== Conference and program changes ==
=== Conference changes ===
- Three conferences began play in 1927:
  - Arkansas Association – active through the 1929 season
  - Arkansas Intercollegiate Conference – an NAIA conference active through the 1994 season
  - Smoky Mountain Conference – active through the 1957 season
- One conference played its final season in 1927:
  - Kansas Collegiate Athletic Conference – active since the 1890 season; previously known as the Kansas Collegiate Athletic Association and Kansas College Athletic Conference; replaced by a conference with the same name that is an active NAIA conference
- Two conferences changed in their name in 1927:
  - The Inter-Normal Athletic Conference of Wisconsin changed its name to the Wisconsin State Teachers College Conference, the name it would retain through the 1951 season
  - The Nebraska Intercollegiate Conference changed its name to the Nebraska College Athletic Conference, the name it would retain until its dissolution after the 1976 season.

=== Program changes ===
- Bowling Green Normal College officially changed their nickname from the Normals, adopting their present moniker, the Falcons.
- After Oregon Agricultural College changed its name to Oregon State Agricultural College, the Oregon Agricultural Aggies became the Oregon State Aggies.

== September ==
September 17 Washington defeated Willamette 32–6. September 24 USC beat Occidental 33–0; Army beat Boston University, 13–0; Pittsburgh beat Thiel College 42–0. Texas A&M shut out Trinity 45–0.

== October ==
October 1 USC beat Santa Clara 52–12. Notre Dame beat Iowa's Coe College 28–7; Army beat Detroit Mercy 6–0. Yale beat Bowdoin 41–0;

The Western Conference (later the Big Ten) teams opened their seasons. Minnesota beat North Dakota, 57–10, Michigan beat Ohio Wesleyan, 33–0, and Illinois beat Bradley, 19–0. Pittsburgh beat Grove City College, 33–0; Nebraska beat Iowa State, 6–0; Georgia beat Virginia, 32–0; and Texas A&M beat Southwest Texas 31–0.

October 8 USC edged Oregon State 13–12; Detroit Mercy, fresh from its 6–0 loss at West Point, played at Notre Dame and lost 20–0; Army beat Marquette 21–12; In a battle of Bulldogs, Georgia beat Yale 14–10 in New Haven. Pittsburgh won another shutout, over West Virginia, 49–0;

Minnesota beat Oklahoma State, 40–0, Michigan beat Michigan State, 21–0, and Illinois beat Butler 58–0. At Columbia, Missouri, Missouri beat Nebraska, 7–6, and Texas A&M recorded its third shutout, an 18–0 win over Sewanee.

October 15 USC played at Stanford University in Palo Alto, to a 13–13 tie. Notre Dame and Navy played at Baltimore, with the Irish winning 19–6. Army beat Davis & Elkins College, 27–6 Yale beat Brown 19–0; In Western Conference play, Minnesota and Indiana played to a 14–14 tie Michigan won at Wisconsin, 14–0, Illinois and Iowa State played to a 12–12 tie, Pittsburgh beat Drake 32–0; Nebraska beat Grinnell College 58–0 Furman v. Georgia took place in Athens, Ga., as the University of Georgia hosted the Paladins of Furman University and won, 32–0. Texas A&M surrendered its first points in a 40–6 win over Arkansas.

October 22 USC beat Caltech 51–0; Notre Dame beat Indiana 19–6 (4–0) Army and (2–1) Yale met at New Haven, with Yale winning 10–6 Minnesota beat Iowa, 38–0 Michigan beat Ohio State, 21–0, Brown was upset by Lebanon Valley, 13–12 Illinois edged Northwestern, 7–6 Pittsburgh beat crosstown team Carnegie Tech, but not in a shutout (23–7). Nebraska was idle; Georgia beat Auburn, 33–3 Texas A&M played at Texas Christian, and was tied, 0–0.

October 29 Michigan (4–0–0) and Illinois (3–0–1) faced off at Champaign, Ill. The Illini won 14–0.

USC beat California, 13–0 Notre Dame beat Georgia Tech, 26–7 Army beat Bucknell 34–0; Yale beat Dartmouth, 19–0; Minnesota beat Wisconsin, 13–7; Pittsburgh beat Allegheny 62–0; Nebraska beat visiting Syracuse, 21–0; Georgia beat Tulane, 31–0 Texas A&M had beaten Texas Tech, 47–6, in a Friday game.

== November ==
November 5 USC was idle, while (5–1–1) Stanford and (7–0–0) Washington met in Seattle for a conference game, with Stanford winning 13–7.

In a meeting of unbeatens, (5–0–0) Notre Dame hosted (4–0–1) Minnesota. The teams played to a 7–7 tie.

Army beat Franklin & Marshall, 45–0; Yale beat Maryland 30–6 Michigan won at Chicago, 14–0 and Illinois beat Iowa 14–0 Pittsburgh and Washington & Jefferson, both (6–0–0), played to a 0–0 tie Nebraska beat Kansas, 47–13; Georgia defeated Florida at Jacksonville, 28–0; Texas A&M beat SMU, 39–13

On Armistice Day, November 11, Texas A&M defeated Rice University in Houston, 14–0.

November 12 USC beat Colorado 46–7; (6–1–0) Army faced off against (5–0–1) Notre Dame at Yankee Stadium. The Cadets handed Rockne's team its first defeat, 18–0

Yale beat Princeton 14–6; Minnesota beat Drake 27–6; Michigan beat Navy 27–12; Illinois beat Chicago 15–6; Georgia beat Clemson, 32–0 (6–0–1) Pittsburgh and (4–1–0) Nebraska faced off in Pittsburgh, with the Panthers winning 21–13

November 19 USC defeated Washington State, 27–0, while Stanford beat visiting California, 13–6 to close their season at 8–2–1. Though USC, at 8–1–1, had the better overall record, Stanford's two losses at been outside the conference, to St. Mary's and to Santa Clara, and they had tied USC. In PCC play, Stanford and USC both finished 4–0–1, and either could have been invited to play in the 1928 Rose Bowl. The Rose Bowl committee went with Stanford, which had been tied by Alabama in the 1927 New Year's Day game.

Notre Dame beat Drake University in Des Moines, 32–0. Drake, which played against Navy, Pitt, Minnesota, Notre Dame and UCLA, would finish at 3–6–0 Army beat Ursinus College 13–0; Yale closed its season hosting Harvard, and won 14–0; Illinois defeated Ohio State, 13–0 At Ann Arbor, (5–0–2) Minnesota visited (6–1–0) Michigan. The Gophers beat the Wolverines 13–7 to close their seasons. Nebraska won at Kansas State, 33–0 Georgia beat Mercer, 26–7

November 24 On Thanksgiving Day, Pittsburgh beat Penn State, 30–0. Pitt, with a record of 8–0–1, had outscored its opponents 283 to 20, with seven shutouts, and was selected to meet Stanford in the Rose Bowl.

Nebraska beat visiting New York University, 27–18; Texas A&M closed its season with a 28–7 win over Texas.

November 26 Notre Dame (6–1–1) and USC (7–0–1) played before an estimated record crowd of 123,000 (Reported as 117,000 in the Chicago Tribune) at Soldier Field in Chicago, with Notre Dame winning 7–6 (on the strength of a blocked extra point attempt) to hand the Trojans their first loss.

In the Army–Navy Game, played before a crowd of 70,000 at the Polo Grounds in New York, Army came back from 9–0 at halftime to win 14–9. In Birmingham, Georgia beat Alabama, 20–6.

In the Army–Navy Game, played before a crowd of 70,000 at the Polo Grounds in New York, Army came back from 9–0 at halftime to win 14–9. In Birmingham, Georgia beat Alabama, 20–6.

(9–0–0) Georgia faced off against (7–1–1) Georgia Tech in Atlanta to close the season. The Yellow Jackets undid the Bulldogs' hopes for a perfect season, winning 12–0

== Rose Bowl ==
As the only post-season college football game, the Rose Bowl sought an East-West matchup between the best available eastern team and the PCC champion. In 1927, the Pitt Panthers had finished the season at 8–0–1, with seven shutouts against various levels of opposition, while Stanford had won the Pacific Coast Conference going 8–2–1. Since January 1, 1928, fell on a Sunday, the game was played on Monday, January 2. Stanford Punter Frankie Wilton had been the "goat" of the 1927 Rose Bowl, after an Alabama defender broke through the line, blocked his kick, and set up the Tide's tying touchdown. Wilton lost the ball after being hit on his own 20 yard line, and Pitt's Jimmy Hagan ran the fumble in for a touchdown. Walter Heinecke of Stanford blocked the point attempt, holding Pitt's lead to 6–0. Wilton's chance at redemption came later, when his teammate Spud Lewis fumbled a yard from goal. Wilton scooped up the ball and crashed through for the tying touchdown. The Stanford kick was good, and the Indians held on for a 7–6 win.

== National championship ==
The University of Illinois (7–0–1) was recognized as champion under the Dickinson System. At season's end, the Rissler Cup was awarded to the team that finished first in the "Dickinson ratings", which considered strength of schedule, in that a win, loss or tie against a "strong" opponent was worth more than one against a lesser team, and the results were averaged. In the final week, Georgia's "Dream and Wonder team" was upset by Georgia Tech. Georgia had upset Eastern power Yale 14–10. Though most selectors retrospectively named either Illinois or Georgia as their 1927 national champions, over a half-century later Jeff Sagarin, a computer-based selector, named Dana X. Bible's Texas Aggies as the No. 1 team.

== Conference standings ==
=== Major conference standings ===
1927 Big Ten Conference football standings
	Conf.					Overall
Team	W		L		T	W		L		T
No. 1 Illinois +	5	–	0	–	0	7	–	0	–	1
No. 3 Minnesota +	3	–	0	–	1	6	–	0	–	2
No. 7 Michigan	3	–	2	–	0	6	–	2	–	0
Chicago	3	–	3	–	0	4	–	4	–	0
Purdue	2	–	2	–	0	6	–	2	–	0
Northwestern	2	–	3	–	0	4	–	4	–	0
Ohio State	2	–	3	–	0	4	–	4	–	0
Indiana	1	–	2	–	1	3	–	4	–	1
Iowa	1	–	4	–	0	4	–	4	–	0
Wisconsin	1	–	4	–	0	4	–	4	–	0
+ – Conference co-champions; Rankings from Dickinson System

1927 Rocky Mountain Conference football standings
	Conf.					Overall
Team	W		L		T	W		L		T
Colorado Agricultural $	7	–	1	–	0	7	–	1	–	0
Denver	5	–	1	–	0	5	–	2	–	0
Montana State	3	–	1	–	0	4	–	4	–	0
Utah	3	–	1	–	1	3	–	3	–	1
Colorado College	5	–	2	–	0	6	–	2	–	0
Colorado	4	–	4	–	0	4	–	5	–	0
Utah Agricultural	3	–	3	–	1	3	–	4	–	1
BYU	2	–	4	–	0	2	–	4	–	1
Colorado Mines	2	–	5	–	0	2	–	5	–	0
Wyoming	1	–	4	–	0	4	–	5	–	0
Western State (CO)	1	–	5	–	0	1	–	6	–	0
Colorado Teachers	1	–	6	–	0	2	–	7	–	0
$ – Conference champion

1927 Missouri Valley Conference football standings
	Conf.					Overall
Team	W		L		T	W		L		T
Missouri $	5	–	1	–	0	7	–	2	–	0
No. 9 Nebraska	4	–	1	–	0	6	–	2	–	0
Oklahoma A&M	2	–	1	–	0	4	–	4	–	0
Iowa State	3	–	2	–	0	4	–	3	–	1
Washington University	2	–	2	–	1	5	–	2	–	2
Kansas	3	–	3	–	1	3	–	4	–	1
Oklahoma	2	–	3	–	0	3	–	3	–	2
Kansas State	2	–	4	–	0	3	–	5	–	0
Drake	1	–	2	–	0	3	–	6	–	0
Grinnell	0	–	5	–	0	0	–	7	–	1
$ – Conference champion; Rankings from Dickinson System

1927 Southern Conference football standings
	Conf.					Overall
Team	W		L		T	W		L		T
Georgia Tech +	7	–	0	–	1	8	–	1	–	1
Tennessee +	5	–	0	–	1	8	–	0	–	1
NC State +	4	–	0	–	0	9	–	1	–	0
Vanderbilt	5	–	0	–	2	8	–	1	–	2
No. 8 Georgia	6	–	1	–	0	9	–	1	–	0
Florida	5	–	2	–	0	7	–	3	–	0
Ole Miss	3	–	2	–	0	5	–	3	–	1
Virginia	4	–	4	–	0	5	–	4	–	0
Clemson	2	–	2	–	0	5	–	3	–	1
Alabama	3	–	4	–	1	5	–	4	–	1
LSU	2	–	3	–	1	4	–	4	–	1
Mississippi A&M	2	–	3	–	0	5	–	3	–	0
Washington and Lee	2	–	3	–	0	4	–	4	–	1
VPI	2	–	3	–	0	5	–	4	–	0
Maryland	3	–	5	–	0	4	–	7	–	0
South Carolina	2	–	4	–	0	4	–	5	–	0
VMI	2	–	4	–	0	6	–	4	–	0
Tulane	2	–	5	–	1	2	–	5	–	1
North Carolina	2	–	5	–	0	4	–	6	–	0
Sewanee	1	–	4	–	0	2	–	6	–	0
Kentucky	1	–	5	–	0	3	–	6	–	1
Auburn	0	–	6	–	1	0	–	7	–	2
+ – Conference co-champions; Rankings from Dickinson System

1927 Pacific Coast Conference football standings
	Conf.					Overall
Team	W		L		T	W		L		T
Stanford ^ +	4	–	0	–	1	8	–	2	–	1
No. 10 USC +	4	–	0	–	1	8	–	1	–	1
Idaho +	2	–	0	–	2	4	–	1	–	3
Washington	4	–	2	–	0	9	–	2	–	0
Oregon State	2	–	3	–	0	3	–	3	–	1
California	2	–	3	–	0	7	–	3	–	0
Washington State	1	–	3	–	1	3	–	3	–	2
Oregon	0	–	4	–	1	2	–	4	–	1
Montana	0	–	4	–	0	3	–	4	–	1
+ – Conference co-champions; ^ – Selected as Rose Bowl representative; Rankings from Dickinson System

1927 Southwest Conference football standings
	Conf.					Overall
Team	W		L		T	W		L		T
No. 11 Texas A&M $	4	–	0	–	1	8	–	0	–	1
SMU	4	–	1	–	0	7	–	2	–	0
Arkansas	2	–	1	–	0	8	–	1	–	0
Texas	2	–	2	–	1	6	–	2	–	1
TCU	1	–	2	–	2	4	–	3	–	2
Rice	1	–	3	–	0	2	–	6	–	1
Baylor	0	–	5	–	0	2	–	7	–	0
$ – Conference champion; Rankings from Dickinson System

=== Independents ===
1927 Eastern college football independents records
	Conf.			Overall
Team	W	L	T	W		L		T
Tufts		–		8	–	0	–	0
Springfield		–		7	–	0	–	2
Washington & Jefferson		–		7	–	0	–	2
No. 6 Army		–		9	–	1	–	0
No. 2 Pittsburgh		–		8	–	1	–	1
Temple		–		7	–	1	–	0
No. 5 Yale		–		7	–	1	–	0
NYU		–		7	–	1	–	2
Princeton		–		6	–	1	–	0
Villanova		–		6	–	1	–	0
Penn State		–		6	–	2	–	1
Columbia		–		5	–	2	–	2
Bucknell		–		6	–	3	–	1
Colgate		–		4	–	2	–	3
CCNY		–		4	–	2	–	2
Lafayette		–		5	–	3	–	1
Penn		–		6	–	4	–	0
Syracuse		–		5	–	3	–	2
Carnegie Tech		–		5	–	4	–	1
Boston College		–		4	–	4	–	0
Harvard		–		4	–	4	–	0
Rutgers		–		4	–	4	–	0
Cornell		–		3	–	3	–	2
Boston University		–		3	–	4	–	1
Drexel		–		3	–	5	–	1
Fordham		–		3	–	5	–	0
Brown		–		3	–	6	–	1
Vermont		–		2	–	6	–	0
Providence		–		1	–	4	–	2
Franklin & Marshall		–		1	–	7	–	1
Lehigh		–		1	–	7	–	1
Rankings from Dickinson System

1927 Midwestern college football independents records
	Conf.			Overall
Team	W	L	T	W		L		T
No. 4 Notre Dame		–		7	–	2	–	1
Detroit		–		7	–	2	–	0
Ball Teachers		–		5	–	2	–	1
Marquette		–		6	–	3	–	0
Michigan Tech		–		2	–	1	–	0
Haskell		–		5	–	3	–	1
Butler		–		4	–	3	–	1
John Carroll		–		3	–	2	–	3
Saint Louis		–		5	–	5	–	0
Lombard		–		4	–	4	–	0
Loyola (IL)		–		4	–	4	–	0
Michigan State		–		4	–	5	–	0
Northern Illinois State		–		1	–	4	–	1
Kent State		–		1	–	5	–	1
Valparaiso		–		1	–	5	–	0
Rankings from Dickinson System

1927 Southern college football independents records
	Conf.			Overall
Team	W	L	T	W		L		T
Georgetown		–		8	–	1	–	0
Spring Hill		–		6	–	1	–	0
Wesley		–		6	–	1	–	0
Georgia Normal		–		6	–	1	–	1
George Washington		–		7	–	2	–	0
Texas A&I		–		4	–	1	–	0
Middle Tennessee State Teachers		–		6	–	2	–	0
Loyola (LA)		–		6	–	2	–	2
Navy		–		6	–	3	–	0
Catholic University		–		5	–	3	–	0
West Tennessee State Teachers		–		5	–	3	–	1
Texas Tech		–		5	–	4	–	0
Davidson		–		4	–	4	–	1
Delaware State		–		1	–	1	–	0
Howard		–		3	–	3	–	2
Southwestern (TN)		–		5	–	5	–	1
Texas Mines		–		2	–	2	–	2
Mississippi State Teachers		–		3	–	4	–	1
Duke		–		4	–	5	–	0
Miami (FL)		–		3	–	6	–	1
Delaware		–		2	–	5	–	1
East Tennessee State Teachers		–		2	–	5	–	0
Oglethorpe		–		2	–	6	–	0
Wake Forest		–		2	–	6	–	2

1927 Western college football independents records
	Conf.			Overall
Team	W	L	T	W		L		T
New Mexico		–		8	–	0	–	1
Hawaii		–		5	–	2	–	0
Arizona		–		4	–	2	–	1
Regis		–		5	–	3	–	0
Gonzaga		–		5	–	3	–	1
Santa Clara		–		5	–	4	–	2
Loyola (CA)		–		4	–	3	–	1
Tempe State		–		2	–	3	–	1
New Mexico A&M		–		3	–	5	–	1
Humboldt State		–		1	–	2	–	0

=== Minor conferences ===
Conference	Champion(s)	Record
Central Intercollegiate Athletics Association	North Carolina A&T	6–0–1
Far Western Conference	Saint Mary's (CA)	3–0
Iowa Intercollegiate Athletic Conference	Iowa State Teachers	6–0
Kansas Collegiate Athletic Conference	Baker (KS); College of Emporia; Kansas State Normal; Kansas Wesleyan	6–0–1
Michigan Intercollegiate Athletic Association	Alma	5–0
Midwest Collegiate Athletic Conference	Cornell College	6–0
Minnesota Intercollegiate Athletic Conference	Gustavus Adolphus	5–0
Missouri Intercollegiate Athletic Association	Northeast Missouri State Teachers	4–0
Nebraska College Athletic Conference	Nebraska State Teachers–Peru	6–0
North Central Intercollegiate Conference	Creighton; South Dakota	2–0; 4–0
Ohio Athletic Conference	Miami (OH); Muskingum	7–1
Oklahoma Intercollegiate Conference	Oklahoma Baptist; Oklahoma City	5–1; 5–1–1
Pacific Northwest Conference	College of Idaho	5–0
Southern California Intercollegiate Athletic Conference	Pomona	6–0–1
South Dakota Intercollegiate Conference	Columbus College	5–0
Southern Intercollegiate Athletic Conference	Tuskegee	7–0–1
Southwestern Athletic Conference	Wiley (TX)	4–0–1
Texas Collegiate Athletic Conference	Southwestern	2–1–1
Texas Intercollegiate Athletic Association	McMurry (TX)	3–0–2
Tri-Normal League	State Normal–Ellensburg	2–0
Wisconsin State Teachers College Conference	La Crosse State Teachers	4–0–1

=== Minor conference standings ===
1927 Buckeye Athletic Association football standings
	Conf.					Overall
Team	W		L		T	W		L		T
Wittenberg $	4	–	0	–	0	8	–	2	–	0
Miami (OH)	3	–	1	–	0	8	–	1	–	0
Ohio	1	–	1	–	2	4	–	2	–	2
Ohio Wesleyan	1	–	2	–	1	4	–	3	–	2
Denison	1	–	3	–	0	3	–	5	–	0
Cincinnati	0	–	3	–	1	2	–	5	–	2
$ – Conference champion

1927 California Coast Conference football standings
	Conf.					Overall
Team	W		L		T	W		L		T
Sacramento $	6	–	0	–	0	?	–	?	–	?
Chico State	5	–	1	–	0	6	–	2	–	0
Modesto	4	–	2	–	0	5	–	3	–	0
Santa Barbara State	2	–	1	–	0	3	–	5	–	0
San Jose State	3	–	3	–	0	4	–	5	–	0
Cal Poly	1	–	4	–	0	2	–	4	–	1
Bakersfield			–			0	–	3	–	1
San Mateo			–					–
Santa Rosa			–					–
$ – Conference champion

1927 Central Pennsylvania Conference football standings
	Conf.					Overall
Team	W		L		T	W		L		T
Gettysburg $	3	–	0	–	0	6	–	3	–	0
Ursinus	2	–	1	–	0	5	–	4	–	0
Muhlenberg	2	–	2	–	0	5	–	4	–	0
Franklin & Marshall	1	–	2	–	0	1	–	7	–	1
Dickinson	1	–	3	–	0	3	–	5	–	0
$ – Conference champion

1927 Colored Intercollegiate Athletic Association football standings
	Conf.					Overall
Team	W		L		T	W		L		T
North Carolina A&T $	6	–	0	–	0	7	–	0	–	0
Hampton	5	–	1	–	1	5	–	1	–	1
Virginia Union	5	–	2	–	0	5	–	2	–	0
Virginia Seminary	3	–	2	–	1	3	–	4	–	1
Virginia Normal	2	–	4	–	0	5	–	4	–	0
Lincoln (PA)	1	–	4	–	0	1	–	6	–	0
Saint Paul (VA)	1	–	5	–	0	4	–	5	–	0
Shaw	0	–	5	–	0	0	–	7	–	1
$ – Conference champion

1927 Far Western Conference football standings
	Conf.					Overall
Team	W		L		T	W		L		T
Saint Mary's $	3	–	0	–	0	7	–	2	–	1
Cal Aggies	2	–	1	–	0	4	–	3	–	1
Fresno State	2	–	1	–	1	3	–	3	–	2
St. Ignatius (CA)	2	–	2	–	1	3	–	5	–	1
Nevada	1	–	3	–	0	2	–	6	–	1
Pacific (CA)	1	–	4	–	0	2	–	6	–	0
$ – Conference champion

1927 Illinois Intercollegiate Athletic Conference football standings
	Conf.					Overall
Team	W		L		T	W		L		T
Bradley $	6	–	1	–	0	6	–	3	–	0
Illinois Wesleyan	6	–	2	–	1	6	–	2	–	1
Eastern Illinois	3	–	1	–	0	5	–	2	–	0
Monmouth (IL)	3	–	1	–	0	4	–	4	–	0
Millikin	3	–	1	–	1	3	–	3	–	1
St. Viator	3	–	1	–	0	6	–	2	–	1
North Central	2	–	1	–	1	5	–	3	–	1
Southern Illinois	2	–	1	–	0	3	–	5	–	2
McKendree	3	–	2	–	1	6	–	2	–	2
Knox (IL)	3	–	2	–	0	4	–	4	–	0
Western Illinois	5	–	3	–	1	6	–	3	–	1
Lake Forest	0	–	0	–	1	3	–	2	–	3
Illinois State Normal	4	–	4	–	0	4	–	4	–	0
Illinois College	3	–	4	–	1	3	–	4	–	1
Mount Morris	2	–	3	–	0	5	–	3	–	0
Carthage	1	–	2	–	2	2	–	3	–	2
Shurtleff	1	–	2	–	2	4	–	3	–	1
Lincoln (IL)	2	–	6	–	0	3	–	6	–	0
Augustana (IL)	1	–	5	–	0	2	–	5	–	0
Wheaton (IL)	0	–	2	–	0	2	–	4	–	1
Eureka	0	–	9	–	0	0	–	9	–	0
$ – Conference champion

1927 Indiana Intercollegiate Conference football standings
	Conf.					Overall
Team	W		L		T	W		L		T
Butler $	4	–	0	–	1	4	–	3	–	1
Manchester	2	–	0	–	1	3	–	2	–	1
Wabash	3	–	1	–	0	7	–	2	–	0
Central Normal	6	–	2	–	0	6	–	2	–	0
DePauw	4	–	2	–	0	4	–	4	–	0
Ball State	3	–	2	–	1	5	–	2	–	1
Evansville	3	–	2	–	0	3	–	5	–	0
Indiana State	2	–	2	–	1	4	–	2	–	1
Earlham	2	–	2	–	1	3	–	2	–	2
Franklin	2	–	2	–	2	2	–	3	–	2
Indiana Central	2	–	3	–	2	2	–	3	–	2
Oakland City	1	–	4	–	1	1	–	4	–	1
Hanover	1	–	4	–	1	1	–	6	–	1
Rose Poly	1	–	5	–	1	1	–	6	–	1
Valparaiso	0	–	1	–	0	1	–	5	–	0
Vincennes	0	–	4	–	0	0	–	4	–	0
$ – Conference champion

1927 Iowa Conference football standings
	Conf.					Overall
Team	W		L		T	W		L		T
Iowa State Teachers $	6	–	0	–	0	7	–	0	–	1
Columbia (IA)	1	–	0	–	0	2	–	3	–	3
Simpson (IA)	4	–	1	–	0	5	–	3	–	0
Upper Iowa	3	–	1	–	1	4	–	1	–	1
Des Moines	3	–	1	–	1	4	–	6	–	1
Western Union	2	–	1	–	0	5	–	2	–	0
Parsons	3	–	2	–	1	4	–	3	–	1
Penn (IA)	3	–	3	–	0	3	–	4	–	1
Morningside	1	–	1	–	0	3	–	5	–	0
Iowa Wesleyan	2	–	3	–	0	4	–	4	–	0
St. Ambrose	1	–	3	–	0	1	–	6	–	0
Central (IA)	1	–	6	–	0	1	–	7	–	0
Buena Vista	0	–	4	–	1	3	–	5	–	1
Luther	0	–	4	–	0	0	–	8	–	0
$ – Conference champion

1927 Kansas Collegiate Athletic Conference football standings
	Conf.					Overall
Team	W		L		T	W		L		T
Baker +	6	–	0	–	1	7	–	0	–	1
College of Emporia +	6	–	0	–	1	7	–	0	–	1
Emporia Teachers +	6	–	0	–	1	7	–	0	–	1
Kansas Wesleyan +	6	–	0	–	1	7	–	0	–	1
Pittsburg Teachers	5	–	2	–	0	6	–	2	–	0
Southwestern (KS)	5	–	2	–	0	6	–	2	–	0
Bethany (KS)	3	–	2	–	1	4	–	2	–	1
St. Mary's (KS)	4	–	3	–	0	4	–	3	–	0
Sterling	4	–	4	–	0	4	–	4	–	0
Wichita	2	–	4	–	0	3	–	4	–	0
Hays Teachers	2	–	4	–	1	3	–	5	–	1
Ottawa	1	–	5	–	1	1	–	6	–	1
Friends	1	–	6	–	0	2	–	6	–	0
McPherson	1	–	6	–	0	1	–	7	–	0
Washburn	1	–	6	–	0	1	–	7	–	0
St. Benedict's	0	–	3	–	1	2	–	5	–	1
Bethel (KS)	0	–	6	–	0	2	–	6	–	0
+ – Conference co-champions

1927 Michigan Collegiate Conference football standings
	Conf.					Overall
Team	W		L		T	W		L		T
Michigan State Normal $	3	–	0	–	0	8	–	0	–	0
Central Michigan	2	–	1	–	0	7	–	1	–	0
Western State Teachers	1	–	2	–	0	3	–	4	–	0
Detroit City College	0	–	3	–	0	2	–	6	–	0
$ – Conference champion

1927 Michigan Intercollegiate Athletic Association football standings
	Conf.					Overall
Team	W		L		T	W		L		T
Alma $	5	–	0	–	0	7	–	1	–	1
Albion	4	–	1	–	0	5	–	3	–	0
Hillsdale	2	–	3	–	0	3	–	5	–	1
Kalamazoo	2	–	3	–	0	3	–	5	–	0
Hope	1	–	4	–	0	1	–	5	–	0
Olivet	1	–	4	–	0	1	–	7	–	0
$ – Conference champion

1927 Midwest Conference football standings
	Conf.					Overall
Team	W		L		T	W		L		T
Cornell (IA) $	6	–	0	–	0	7	–	1	–	0
Carleton	3	–	1	–	0	6	–	1	–	0
Coe	3	–	2	–	0	4	–	3	–	1
Knox	2	–	2	–	0	4	–	4	–	0
Ripon	2	–	2	–	0	3	–	3	–	1
Hamline	1	–	1	–	0	2	–	4	–	1
Lawrence	1	–	2	–	0	2	–	5	–	0
Monmouth (IL)	1	–	3	–	0	4	–	4	–	0
Beloit	0	–	6	–	0	1	–	6	–	1
$ – Conference champion

1927 Minnesota Intercollegiate Athletic Conference football standings
	Conf.					Overall
Team	W		L		T	W		L		T
Gustavus Adolphus $	5	–	0	–	0	7	–	1	–	0
Augsburg	3	–	2	–	0	4	–	2	–	0
Macalester	3	–	2	–	0	3	–	4	–	0
Concordia (MN)	2	–	2	–	0	4	–	2	–	0
Hamline	1	–	2	–	1	2	–	4	–	1
St. Olaf	1	–	3	–	0	2	–	5	–	0
Saint John's (MN)	0	–	4	–	1	2	–	4	–	1
$ – Conference champion

1927 Missouri College Athletic Union football standings
	Conf.					Overall
Team	W		L		T	W		L		T
Missouri Valley $	6	–	0	–	0	7	–	0	–	0
Missouri Wesleyan	5	–	0	–	0	7	–	0	–	0
Central (MO)	4	–	1	–	0	6	–	2	–	0
Westminster (MO)	2	–	1	–	0	2	–	4	–	1
William Jewell	3	–	3	–	0	4	–	4	–	0
Culver–Stockton	2	–	4	–	0	3	–	5	–	0
Missouri Mines	1	–	2	–	0	2	–	5	–	1
Central Wesleyan	1	–	5	–	0	2	–	6	–	0
Tarkio	0	–	4	–	0	4	–	5	–	1
Drury	0	–	4	–	0	0	–	5	–	0
$ – Conference champion

1927 Missouri Intercollegiate Athletic Association football standings
	Conf.					Overall
Team	W		L		T	W		L		T
Kirksville $	4	–	0	–	0	8	–	1	–	0
Warrensburg	3	–	1	–	0	5	–	3	–	0
Springfield (MO)	2	–	2	–	0	4	–	3	–	0
Cape Girardeau	1	–	3	–	0	1	–	5	–	2
Maryville (MO)	0	–	4	–	0	1	–	7	–	0
$ – Conference champion

1927 Nebraska College Athletic Conference football standings
	Conf.					Overall
Team	W		L		T	W		L		T
Peru Normal $	6	–	0	–	0	8	–	0	–	0
Doane	5	–	0	–	1	6	–	1	–	1
York (NE)	3	–	0	–	3	3	–	2	–	3
Chadron Normal	4	–	1	–	0	7	–	2	–	0
Kearney Normal	3	–	1	–	2	4	–	2	–	2
Nebraska Central	4	–	2	–	0	?	–	?	–	?
Midland	3	–	3	–	2	3	–	4	–	3
Cotner	2	–	4	–	0	?	–	?	–	?
Hastings	2	–	4	–	0	4	–	5	–	0
Grand Island	1	–	3	–	2	1	–	5	–	2
Wayne Normal	1	–	3	–	1	1	–	6	–	1
Omaha	1	–	5	–	0	3	–	6	–	0
Nebraska Wesleyan	0	–	4	–	1	0	–	8	–	1
Dana	0	–	5	–	0	0	–	7	–	0
$ – Conference champion

1927 New England Conference football standings
	Conf.					Overall
Team	W		L		T	W		L		T
Maine $	3	–	0	–	0	6	–	1	–	0
Rhode Island State	2	–	1	–	0	5	–	3	–	0
Connecticut	1	–	2	–	0	5	–	4	–	0
New Hampshire	0	–	3	–	0	0	–	7	–	1
Massachusetts	0	–	0	–	0	0	–	7	–	1
$ – Conference champion

1927 North Central Conference football standings
	Conf.					Overall
Team	W		L		T	W		L		T
South Dakota +	5	–	0	–	0	7	–	2	–	0
Creighton +	2	–	0	–	0	6	–	1	–	1
South Dakota State	2	–	2	–	0	5	–	3	–	0
North Dakota	2	–	2	–	0	4	–	4	–	0
Morningside	1	–	3	–	0	3	–	5	–	0
North Dakota Agricultural	1	–	3	–	0	3	–	5	–	0
Nebraska Wesleyan	0	–	3	–	0	0	–	8	–	1
+ – Conference co-champions

1927 Northwest Conference football standings
	Conf.					Overall
Team	W		L		T	W		L		T
College of Idaho $	5	–	0	–	0	6	–	1	–	0
Whitman	4	–	1	–	0	5	–	4	–	0
Willamette	2	–	2	–	1	3	–	3	–	2
Puget Sound	1	–	2	–	1	3	–	4	–	1
Linfield	0	–	3	–	1	3	–	5	–	1
Pacific (OR)	0	–	4	–	1	1	–	5	–	1
$ – Conference champion

1927 Northwest Ohio League football standings
	Conf.					Overall
Team	W		L		T	W		L		T
Toledo $	3	–	0	–	0	5	–	2	–	0
Bowling Green	2	–	1	–	0	5	–	1	–	1
Bluffton	2	–	2	–	0	4	–	2	–	0
Defiance	2	–	2	–	0	5	–	3	–	0
Findlay	0	–	4	–	0	0	–	9	–	0
$ – Conference champion

1927 Ohio Athletic Conference football standings
	Conf.					Overall
Team	W		L		T	W		L		T
Miami (OH) +	7	–	1	–	0	8	–	1	–	0
Muskingum +	7	–	1	–	0	8	–	1	–	0
Oberlin	6	–	1	–	1	6	–	1	–	1
Mount Union	6	–	1	–	1	6	–	2	–	1
Wittenberg	4	–	1	–	0	8	–	2	–	0
Wooster	5	–	2	–	0	6	–	2	–	0
Dayton	2	–	1	–	0	6	–	3	–	0
Ohio	3	–	1	–	2	4	–	2	–	2
Heidelberg	4	–	2	–	0	4	–	3	–	0
Akron	4	–	3	–	0	5	–	3	–	0
Ohio Wesleyan	2	–	2	–	1	4	–	3	–	2
Denison	3	–	4	–	0	3	–	5	–	0
Marietta	2	–	3	–	1	2	–	3	–	1
Otterbein	2	–	4	–	0	2	–	4	–	1
Ohio Northern	2	–	5	–	0	3	–	6	–	0
Western Reserve	2	–	5	–	0	2	–	6	–	0
Capital	1	–	3	–	0	3	–	4	–	0
Baldwin–Wallace	2	–	6	–	0	2	–	6	–	0
Case	2	–	6	–	0	2	–	6	–	0
Cincinnati	0	–	4	–	2	2	–	5	–	2
Kenyon	1	–	5	–	0	1	–	6	–	1
Hiram	0	–	7	–	0	0	–	7	–	0
St. Xavier *	1	–	0	–	0	8	–	1	–	1
+ – Conference co-champions; * – did not compete for championship

4

1927 Oklahoma Intercollegiate Conference football standings
	Conf.					Overall
Team	W		L		T	W		L		T
Oklahoma City +	5	–	1	–	2	8	–	1	–	2
Oklahoma Baptist +	5	–	1	–	1	6	–	1	–	2
Tulsa	3	–	1	–	0	8	–	1	–	0
Central State Teachers	3	–	1	–	3	3	–	1	–	4
Phillips	5	–	2	–	1	5	–	2	–	1
Northeastern State	2	–	3	–	1	3	–	4	–	1
Northwestern Oklahoma State	1	–	3	–	1	4	–	3	–	1
Southeastern Oklahoma State	1	–	4	–	1	2	–	5	–	3
Southwestern State	1	–	5	–	1	1	–	6	–	2
East Central	0	–	6	–	1	1	–	6	–	1
+ – Conference co-champions

1927 Smoky Mountain Conference football standings
	Conf.					Overall
Team	W		L		T	W		L		T
Emory and Henry	3	–	0	–	0	9	–	0	–	0
Milligan	3	–	0	–	0	6	–	2	–	0
Maryville (TN)	3	–	0	–	0	6	–	2	–	1
King	1	–	3	–	1	1	–	6	–	1
Carson–Newman	1	–	4	–	0	2	–	8	–	0
Tusculum	0	–	4	–	1	0	–	5	–	2
No championship was awarded.

1927 South Dakota Intercollegiate Conference football standings
	Conf.					Overall
Team	W		L		T	W		L		T
South Dakota Mines +	6	–	0	–	0	7	–	1	–	0
Columbus (SD) +	5	–	0	–	0	7	–	0	–	0
Dakota Wesleyan	5	–	1	–	0	5	–	1	–	0
Southern Normal	4	–	2	–	1	4	–	2	–	2
Yankton	2	–	2	–	1	3	–	3	–	1
Huron	2	–	3	–	0	3	–	5	–	0
Augustana (SD)	2	–	3	–	0	2	–	4	–	0
Sioux Falls	1	–	4	–	0	3	–	4	–	0
Spearfish	1	–	4	–	1	1	–	6	–	1
Northern Normal	0	–	4	–	2	0	–	7	–	2
Eastern Normal	0	–	5	–	1	0	–	6	–	1
+ – Conference co-champions

1927 Southern Intercollegiate Athletic Association football standings
	Conf.					Overall
Team	W		L		T	W		L		T
Mississippi College +	8	–	0	–	0	8	–	0	–	0
Chattanooga +	5	–	0	–	0	8	–	1	–	0
Centenary +	4	–	0	–	0	10	–	0	–	0
Furman +	3	–	0	–	0	10	–	1	–	0
Georgetown (KY)	1	–	0	–	0	1	–	0	–	1
Stetson	4	–	0	–	1	6	–	0	–	1
Loyola (LA)	1	–	0	–	1	6	–	2	–	2
Wofford	2	–	1	–	2	2	–	4	–	3
Presbyterian	2	–	2	–	1	3	–	3	–	3
Mercer	2	–	2	–	0	5	–	4	–	0
Louisville	2	–	2	–	0	4	–	4	–	0
Louisiana College	1	–	1	–	0	1	–	1	–	0
Union (TN)	2	–	3	–	0	6	–	4	–	0
The Citadel	2	–	3	–	1	3	–	6	–	1
Centre	2	–	3	–	0	3	–	6	–	0
Howard (AL)	1	–	2	–	1	7	–	2	–	2
Southern College	2	–	4	–	1	2	–	5	–	1
Birmingham–Southern	2	–	4	–	0	3	–	6	–	0
Western Kentucky State Normal	2	–	4	–	0	5	–	4	–	0
Erskine	1	–	2	–	1	2	–	4	–	1
Louisiana Tech	1	–	3	–	0	3	–	5	–	0
SW Louisiana	1	–	4	–	0	2	–	7	–	1
Millsaps	1	–	5	–	0	3	–	8	–	0
Rollins	0	–	2	–	0	1	–	5	–	0
Transylvania	0	–	5	–	0	0	–	9	–	0
Newberry	0	–	6	–	0	0	–	8	–	1
Kentucky Wesleyan	0	–	0	–	0	0	–	0	–	0
+ – Conference co-champions

1927 Southern Intercollegiate Athletic Conference football standings
	Conf.					Overall
Team	W		L		T	W		L		T
Tuskegee $	7	–	0	–	1	9	–	0	–	1
Clark (GA)	4	–	1	–	2	5	–	1	–	2
Atlanta	3	–	1	–	3	5	–	1	–	3
Alabama State	3	–	1	–	2	6	–	2	–	2
Tennessee State	1	–	1	–	2	1	–	2	–	3
Morehouse	3	–	5	–	0	5	–	5	–	1
Fisk	1	–	2	–	2	3	–	2	–	3
Knoxville	1	–	3	–	1	3	–	5	–	1
Morris Brown	1	–	3	–	1	2	–	3	–	2
Talladega	1	–	5	–	0	3	–	5	–	0
Florida A&M	0	–	3	–	0	5	–	3	–	0
$ – Conference champion

1927 Southern California Conference football standings
	Conf.					Overall
Team	W		L		T	W		L		T
Pomona $	6	–	0	–	1	6	–	0	–	1
UCLA	4	–	0	–	1	6	–	2	–	1
Whittier	4	–	2	–	1	6	–	2	–	1
Occidental	2	–	3	–	0	3	–	5	–	1
Caltech	2	–	3	–	1	2	–	5	–	1
San Diego State	2	–	3	–	0	4	–	3	–	0
Redlands	1	–	6	–	0	1	–	6	–	0
La Verne	0	–	4	–	0	3	–	4	–	0
$ – Conference champion

1927 Southwestern Athletic Conference football standings
	Conf.					Overall
Team	W		L		T	W		L		T
Wiley $	4	–	0	–	1	5	–	1	–	1
Prairie View	3	–	1	–	1	4	–	2	–	1
Paul Quinn	3	–	2	–	0	?	–	?	–	?
Samuel Huston	2	–	3	–	0	?	–	?	–	?
Texas College	1	–	3	–	1	?	–	?	–	?
Bishop	0	–	4	–	1	?	–	?	–	?
$ – Conference champion

1927 Texas Conference football standings
	Conf.					Overall
Team	W		L		T	W		L		T
Southwestern (TX) $	2	–	1	–	1	4	–	2	–	1
Simmons (TX)	2	–	1	–	2	5	–	3	–	2
Howard Payne	3	–	2	–	0	6	–	3	–	0
St. Edward's	1	–	1	–	1	3	–	3	–	3
Trinity (TX)	1	–	2	–	1	3	–	5	–	1
Austin	0	–	2	–	1	1	–	5	–	1
$ – Conference champion

1927 Texas Intercollegiate Athletic Association football standings
	Conf.					Overall
Team	W		L		T	W		L		T
McMurry $	3	–	0	–	2	4	–	1	–	2
Abilene Christian	4	–	1	–	0	6	–	1	–	1
Southwest Texas State	3	–	1	–	1	4	–	4	–	1
Sam Houston State	3	–	1	–	1	4	–	4	–	1
West Texas State	2	–	2	–	0	6	–	3	–	1
Daniel Baker	2	–	2	–	1	4	–	5	–	1
Stephen F. Austin	1	–	3	–	2	1	–	6	–	3
North Texas State Teachers	0	–	3	–	2	1	–	6	–	2
East Texas State	0	–	5	–	1	0	–	6	–	2
$ – Conference champion

1927 Tri-State Conference football standings
	Conf.					Overall
Team	W		L		T	W		L		T
Geneva $	4	–	0	–	0	8	–	0	–	1
Duquesne	2	–	2	–	1	4	–	4	–	1
Westminster (PA)	1	–	1	–	1	2	–	3	–	2
Bethany (WV)	1	–	1	–	1	1	–	6	–	1
Waynesburg	1	–	2	–	2	1	–	5	–	3
Thiel	0	–	3	–	1	1	–	7	–	1
$ – Conference champion

1927 Virginia Conference football standings
	Conf.					Overall
Team	W		L		T	W		L		T
William & Mary $	2	–	0	–	1	4	–	5	–	1
Emory and Henry	1	–	0	–	0	9	–	0	–	0
Richmond	3	–	1	–	1	4	–	4	–	1
Roanoke	2	–	1	–	1	5	–	3	–	1
Randolph–Macon	1	–	2	–	1	2	–	3	–	1
Hampden–Sydney	1	–	3	–	0	4	–	5	–	0
Lynchburg	1	–	4	–	0	1	–	7	–	1
$ – Conference champion

1927 West Virginia Athletic Conference football standings
	Conf.					Overall
Team	W		L		T	W		L		T
West Liberty State $	4	–	0	–	0	6	–	1	–	1
Marshall	4	–	1	–	0	5	–	3	–	1
Davis & Elkins	3	–	1	–	0	5	–	5	–	0
West Virginia Wesleyan	3	–	1	–	0	3	–	6	–	1
Salem	4	–	2	–	0	5	–	2	–	0
Glenville State	4	–	2	–	2	4	–	2	–	2
Potomac State	2	–	2	–	0	2	–	3	–	1
Broaddus	2	–	3	–	1	2	–	5	–	1
Shepherd	0	–	3	–	0	4	–	3	–	0
Fairmont State	0	–	4	–	3	0	–	5	–	3
New River State	0	–	6	–	0	0	–	6	–	0
West Virginia *	2	–	0	–	0	2	–	4	–	3
Concord *	2	–	1	–	0	6	–	3	–	1
Morris Harvey *	1	–	2	–	0	3	–	4	–	1
$ – Conference champion; * – Did not qualify for conference standings Ties did not count in conference standings.

1927 Wisconsin State Teachers College Conference football standings
	Conf.					Overall
Team	W		L		T	W		L		T
La Crosse State $	4	–	0	–	1	5	–	0	–	2
Whitewater State	3	–	1	–	0	5	–	1	–	0
River Falls State	3	–	1	–	1	5	–	1	–	1
Milwaukee State	2	–	1	–	1	4	–	2	–	2
Eau Claire State	2	–	2	–	0	3	–	2	–	0
Superior State	2	–	2	–	0	5	–	3	–	0
Oshkosh State	1	–	2	–	1	2	–	3	–	1
Stout Institute	1	–	3	–	0	3	–	3	–	0
Stevens Point State	1	–	3	–	0	2	–	3	–	1
Platteville State	0	–	4	–	0	0	–	4	–	1
$ – Conference champion; Superior State forfeited to Eau Claire State.

== Rankings ==
=== Champions (per rankings) ===
Various different rankings (using differing methodologies) have identified either Georgia, Illinois, Notre Dame, Texas A&M, or Yale as the season's champion.

- Berryman QPRS: Georgia
- Billingsley Report: Illinois
- Boand System: Georgia
- College Football Researchers Association: Yale
- Parke H. Davis: (Note: for Spalding's Official Foot Ball Guide) Illinois
- Dickinson System: Illinois
- Helms Athletic Foundation: Illinois
- Houlgate System: Notre Dame
- National Championship Foundation: Illinois
- Poling System: Georgia
- Sagarin Ratings Elo chess method: Texas A&M
- Sagarin Ratings Predictor method: Texas A&M

Note: besides the Dickinson System and Houlgate System, all 1927 rankings were given retroactively

=== Dickinson System rankings ===
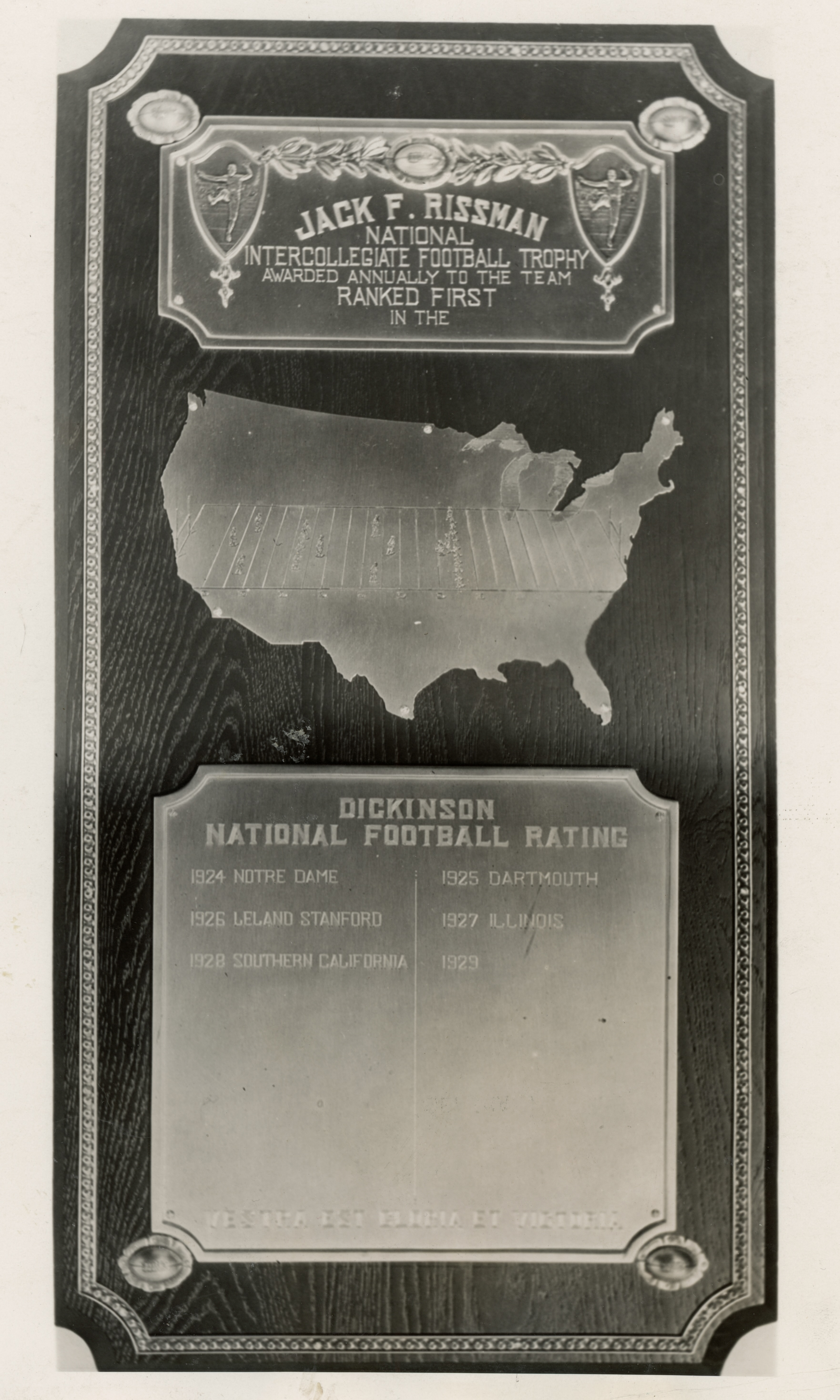
Jack F. Rissman National Intercollegiate Football Trophy — Awarded annually to the team ranked first in the Dickinson National Football Rating

Frank G. Dickinson, an economics professor at the University of Illinois, had invented the Dickinson System to rank colleges based upon their records and the strength of their opposition. The system was originally designed to rank teams in the Big Nine (later the Big Ten) conference. Chicago clothing manufacturer Jack Rissman then persuaded Dickinson to rank the nation's teams under the system, and awarded the Rissman Trophy to the winning university.

Although Dickinson retroactively applied the system to the 1924 and 1925 seasons, the year 1926 was the first in which the trophy was awarded at season's end. The system awarded 30 points for a win over a "strong team", and 20 for a win over a "weak team". Losses were awarded points (15 for loss to a strong team, 10 for loss to a weak team). Ties were treated as half a win and half a loss (22.5 for a tie with a strong team, 15 for a tie with a weak team). An average was then derived by dividing the points by games played.

Rank	Team	Record	Rating
1	Illinois	7–0–1	21.50
2	Pittsburgh	8–0–1	21.42
3	Minnesota	6–0–2	20.88
4	Notre Dame	7–1–1	20.83
5	Yale	7–1	20.00
6	Army	9–1	18.75
7	Michigan	6–2	18.33
8	Georgia	9–1	17.50
9	Nebraska	6–2	17.42
10	USC	8–1–1	16.35
11	Texas A&M	8–0–1	15.00

== Awards and honors ==
=== All-Americans ===
The consensus All-America team included:

Position	Name	Height	Weight (lbs.)	Class	Hometown	Team
QB	Morley Drury	6'0"	185	Sr.	Long Beach, California	USC
HB	Gibby Welch	5'11"	170	Sr.	Parkersburg, West Virginia	Pittsburgh
HB	Chris Cagle	5'9"	167	So.	De Ridder, Louisiana	Army
FB	Herb Joesting	6'1"	192	Sr.	Owatonna, Minnesota	Minnesota
E	Bennie Oosterbaan	6'0"	180	Sr.	Muskegon, Michigan	Michigan
T	Jesse Hibbs	6'0"	195	Jr.	Normal, Illinois	USC
G	Bill Webster	6'0"	200	Sr.	Lakeville, Connecticut	Yale
C	Larry Bettencourt	5'11"	195	Sr.	Newark, California	Saint Mary's
C	John Charlesworth	5'11"	198	Sr.	Clarksburg, Massachusetts	Yale
G	John "Clipper" Smith	5'9"	164	Sr.	Hartford, Connecticut	Notre Dame
T	Ed Hake	6'0"	190	Sr.	Philadelphia, Pennsylvania	Penn
E	Tom Nash	6'3"	200	Sr.	Washington, Georgia	Georgia

=== Statistical leaders ===
- Player scoring most points: Jimmy Armistead, Vanderbilt, 138
- Total offense leader: Bill Spears, Vanderbilt, 2001
