= 1927 Colgate football team =

American college football season

1927 Colgate football
- Conference: Independent
- Record: 4–2–3
- Head coach: George Hauser (2nd season)
- Captain: William Timm
- Home stadium: Whitnall Field

1927 Eastern college football independents records
	Conf.			Overall
Team	W	L	T	W		L		T
Tufts		–		8	–	0	–	0
Springfield		–		7	–	0	–	2
Washington & Jefferson		–		7	–	0	–	2
No. 6 Army		–		9	–	1	–	0
No. 2 Pittsburgh		–		8	–	1	–	1
Temple		–		7	–	1	–	0
No. 5 Yale		–		7	–	1	–	0
NYU		–		7	–	1	–	2
Princeton		–		6	–	1	–	0
Villanova		–		6	–	1	–	0
Penn State		–		6	–	2	–	1
Columbia		–		5	–	2	–	2
Bucknell		–		6	–	3	–	1
Colgate		–		4	–	2	–	3
CCNY		–		4	–	2	–	2
Lafayette		–		5	–	3	–	1
Penn		–		6	–	4	–	0
Syracuse		–		5	–	3	–	2
Carnegie Tech		–		5	–	4	–	1
Boston College		–		4	–	4	–	0
Harvard		–		4	–	4	–	0
Rutgers		–		4	–	4	–	0
Cornell		–		3	–	3	–	2
Boston University		–		3	–	4	–	1
Drexel		–		3	–	5	–	1
Fordham		–		3	–	5	–	0
Brown		–		3	–	6	–	1
Vermont		–		2	–	6	–	0
Providence		–		1	–	4	–	2
Franklin & Marshall		–		1	–	7	–	1
Lehigh		–		1	–	7	–	1
Rankings from Dickinson System

The 1927 Colgate football team represented Colgate University as an independent during the 1927 college football season. In it second season under head coach George Hauser, Colgate compiled a 4–2–3 record and outscored opponents by a total of 99 to 33.

== Schedule ==
Date	Opponent	Site	Result	Attendance	Source
September 24	Hamilton	Whitnall Field; Hamilton, NY	W 21–0		
October 1	St. Lawrence	Whitnall Field; Hamilton, NY	W 32–0		
October 8	VPI	Whitnall Field; Hamilton, NY	L 0–6		
October 15	at Columbia	Baker Field; New York, NY	W 13–7		
October 22	Wabash	Whitnall Field; Hamilton, NY	L 0–7		
October 29	at NYU	Yankee Stadium; Bronx, NY	T 0–0	45,000	
November 5	Hobart	Whitnall Field; Hamilton, NY	W 20–0		
November 12	at Syracuse	Archbold Stadium; Syracuse, NY	T 13–13	32,000	
November 26	at Brown	Brown Stadium; Providence, RI	T 0–0		
