= 1927 Bucknell Bison football team =

American college football season

1927 Bucknell Bison football
- Conference: Independent
- Record: 6–3–1
- Head coach: Carl Snavely (1st season)
- Home stadium: Memorial Stadium

1927 Eastern college football independents records
	Conf.			Overall
Team	W	L	T	W		L		T
Tufts		–		8	–	0	–	0
Springfield		–		7	–	0	–	2
Washington & Jefferson		–		7	–	0	–	2
No. 6 Army		–		9	–	1	–	0
No. 2 Pittsburgh		–		8	–	1	–	1
Temple		–		7	–	1	–	0
No. 5 Yale		–		7	–	1	–	0
NYU		–		7	–	1	–	2
Princeton		–		6	–	1	–	0
Villanova		–		6	–	1	–	0
Penn State		–		6	–	2	–	1
Columbia		–		5	–	2	–	2
Bucknell		–		6	–	3	–	1
Colgate		–		4	–	2	–	3
CCNY		–		4	–	2	–	2
Lafayette		–		5	–	3	–	1
Penn		–		6	–	4	–	0
Syracuse		–		5	–	3	–	2
Carnegie Tech		–		5	–	4	–	1
Boston College		–		4	–	4	–	0
Harvard		–		4	–	4	–	0
Rutgers		–		4	–	4	–	0
Cornell		–		3	–	3	–	2
Boston University		–		3	–	4	–	1
Drexel		–		3	–	5	–	1
Fordham		–		3	–	5	–	0
Brown		–		3	–	6	–	1
Vermont		–		2	–	6	–	0
Providence		–		1	–	4	–	2
Franklin & Marshall		–		1	–	7	–	1
Lehigh		–		1	–	7	–	1
Rankings from Dickinson System

The 1927 Bucknell Bison football team was an American football team that represented Bucknell University as an independent during the 1927 college football season. In its first season under head coach Carl Snavely, the team compiled a 6–3–1 record.

The team played its home games at Memorial Stadium in Lewisburg, Pennsylvania.

== Schedule ==
Date	Opponent	Site	Result	Attendance	Source
September 24	Susquehanna	Memorial Stadium; Lewisburg, PA	W 43–7		
October 1	Geneva	Memorial Stadium; Lewisburg, PA	T 0–0		
October 8	at Penn State	New Beaver Field; State College, PA	W 13–7	5,000	
October 15	vs. Villanova	Brooks Field; Scranton, PA	W 28–12	15,000	
October 22	Gettysburg	Memorial Stadium; Lewisburg, PA	W 34–0		
October 29	at Army	Michie Stadium; West Point, NY	L 0–34		
November 5	at Lehigh	Taylor Stadium; Bethlehem, PA	W 20–6		
November 12	Washington & Jefferson^{†}	Memorial Stadium; Lewisburg, PA	L 3–19	15,000	
November 19	at Temple	Franklin Field; Philadelphia, PA	L 13–19	25,000	
November 24	Dickinson	Memorial Stadium; Lewisburg, PA	W 46–0		
^{†}Homecoming
