= 1927 Drexel Dragons football team =

American college football season

1927 Drexel Dragons football
- Conference: Independent
- Record: 3–5–1
- Head coach: Walter Halas (1st season)

1927 Eastern college football independents records
	Conf.			Overall
Team	W	L	T	W		L		T
Tufts		–		8	–	0	–	0
Springfield		–		7	–	0	–	2
Washington & Jefferson		–		7	–	0	–	2
No. 6 Army		–		9	–	1	–	0
No. 2 Pittsburgh		–		8	–	1	–	1
Temple		–		7	–	1	–	0
No. 5 Yale		–		7	–	1	–	0
NYU		–		7	–	1	–	2
Princeton		–		6	–	1	–	0
Villanova		–		6	–	1	–	0
Penn State		–		6	–	2	–	1
Columbia		–		5	–	2	–	2
Bucknell		–		6	–	3	–	1
Colgate		–		4	–	2	–	3
CCNY		–		4	–	2	–	2
Lafayette		–		5	–	3	–	1
Penn		–		6	–	4	–	0
Syracuse		–		5	–	3	–	2
Carnegie Tech		–		5	–	4	–	1
Boston College		–		4	–	4	–	0
Harvard		–		4	–	4	–	0
Rutgers		–		4	–	4	–	0
Cornell		–		3	–	3	–	2
Boston University		–		3	–	4	–	1
Drexel		–		3	–	5	–	1
Fordham		–		3	–	5	–	0
Brown		–		3	–	6	–	1
Vermont		–		2	–	6	–	0
Providence		–		1	–	4	–	2
Franklin & Marshall		–		1	–	7	–	1
Lehigh		–		1	–	7	–	1
Rankings from Dickinson System

The 1927 Drexel Dragons football team represented Drexel Institute of Art, Science, and Industry—now known as Drexel University—in the 1927 college football season. The team was led by Walter Halas in his first season as head coach.

== Schedule ==
Date	Opponent	Site	Result	Attendance
September 24	at Juniata		T 0–0	
October 1	at Schuylkill	Reading, PA	L 0–12	
October 8	at Carnegie Tech	Forbes Field; Pittsburgh, PA	L 0–58	
October 15	at Susquehanna	Aikens Field; Selinsgrove, PA	L 0–13	
October 22	at Haverford	Haverford, PA	L 0–26	3,000
October 29	Upsala	Drexel Field; Philadelphia, PA	W 43–0	
November 5	New York Aggies	Drexel Field; Philadelphia, PA	W 51–0	
November 12	Saint Joseph's	Drexel Field; Philadelphia, PA	L 0–7	10,000
November 19	Washington College	Philadelphia, PA	W 19–6	

== Roster ==
1927 Drexel Dragons football team roster
Players			Coaches
Offense: Pos. / # / Name / Class	Defense: Pos. / # / Name / Class	Special teams: Pos. / # / Name / Class	Head coach: Walter Halas (Illinois); Coordinators/assistant coaches Legend: (C) Team captain; (S) Suspended; (I) Ineligible; Injured; Redshirt
