= 1927 NYU Violets football team =

American college football season

1927 NYU Violets football
- Conference: Independent
- Record: 7–1–2
- Head coach: Chick Meehan (3rd season)
- Home stadium: Ohio Field; Yankee Stadium

1927 Eastern college football independents records
	Conf.			Overall
Team	W	L	T	W		L		T
Tufts		–		8	–	0	–	0
Springfield		–		7	–	0	–	2
Washington & Jefferson		–		7	–	0	–	2
No. 6 Army		–		9	–	1	–	0
No. 2 Pittsburgh		–		8	–	1	–	1
Temple		–		7	–	1	–	0
No. 5 Yale		–		7	–	1	–	0
NYU		–		7	–	1	–	2
Princeton		–		6	–	1	–	0
Villanova		–		6	–	1	–	0
Penn State		–		6	–	2	–	1
Columbia		–		5	–	2	–	2
Bucknell		–		6	–	3	–	1
Colgate		–		4	–	2	–	3
CCNY		–		4	–	2	–	2
Lafayette		–		5	–	3	–	1
Penn		–		6	–	4	–	0
Syracuse		–		5	–	3	–	2
Carnegie Tech		–		5	–	4	–	1
Boston College		–		4	–	4	–	0
Harvard		–		4	–	4	–	0
Rutgers		–		4	–	4	–	0
Cornell		–		3	–	3	–	2
Boston University		–		3	–	4	–	1
Drexel		–		3	–	5	–	1
Fordham		–		3	–	5	–	0
Brown		–		3	–	6	–	1
Vermont		–		2	–	6	–	0
Providence		–		1	–	4	–	2
Franklin & Marshall		–		1	–	7	–	1
Lehigh		–		1	–	7	–	1
Rankings from Dickinson System

The 1927 NYU Violets football team was an American football team that represented New York University as an independent during the 1927 college football season. In their third year under head coach Chick Meehan, the team compiled a 7–1–2 record.

== Schedule ==
Date	Opponent	Site	Result	Attendance	Source
September 24	Niagara	Ohio Field; Bronx, NY	W 27–0	12,000	
October 1	West Virginia Wesleyan	Ohio Field; Bronx, NY	W 27–13	15,000	
October 8	Alfred	Ohio Field; Bronx, NY	W 65–0	9,000	
October 15	vs. Fordham	Yankee Stadium; Bronx, NY	W 32–0	43,000	
October 22	Rutgers	Yankee Stadium; Bronx, NY	W 60–6		
October 29	Colgate	Yankee Stadium; Bronx, NY	T 0–0	45,000	
November 5	Carnegie Tech	Yankee Stadium; Bronx, NY	W 20–6		
November 12	at Penn State	New Beaver Field; State College, PA	T 13–13	12,000	
November 19	Allegheny	Yankee Stadium; Bronx, NY	W 81–0	25,000	
November 24	at Nebraska	Memorial Stadium; Lincoln, NE	L 18–27	30,000	
