= 1927 Vermont Catamounts football team =

American college football season

1927 Vermont Catamounts football
- Conference: Independent
- Record: 2–6
- Head coach: William McAvoy (3rd season)
- Home stadium: Centennial Field

1927 Eastern college football independents records
	Conf.			Overall
Team	W	L	T	W		L		T
Tufts		–		8	–	0	–	0
Springfield		–		7	–	0	–	2
Washington & Jefferson		–		7	–	0	–	2
No. 6 Army		–		9	–	1	–	0
No. 2 Pittsburgh		–		8	–	1	–	1
Temple		–		7	–	1	–	0
No. 5 Yale		–		7	–	1	–	0
NYU		–		7	–	1	–	2
Princeton		–		6	–	1	–	0
Villanova		–		6	–	1	–	0
Penn State		–		6	–	2	–	1
Columbia		–		5	–	2	–	2
Bucknell		–		6	–	3	–	1
Colgate		–		4	–	2	–	3
CCNY		–		4	–	2	–	2
Lafayette		–		5	–	3	–	1
Penn		–		6	–	4	–	0
Syracuse		–		5	–	3	–	2
Carnegie Tech		–		5	–	4	–	1
Boston College		–		4	–	4	–	0
Harvard		–		4	–	4	–	0
Rutgers		–		4	–	4	–	0
Cornell		–		3	–	3	–	2
Boston University		–		3	–	4	–	1
Drexel		–		3	–	5	–	1
Fordham		–		3	–	5	–	0
Brown		–		3	–	6	–	1
Vermont		–		2	–	6	–	0
Providence		–		1	–	4	–	2
Franklin & Marshall		–		1	–	7	–	1
Lehigh		–		1	–	7	–	1
Rankings from Dickinson System

The 1927 Vermont Catamounts football team was an American football team that represented the University of Vermont as an independent during the 1927 college football season. In their third year under head coach William McAvoy, the team compiled a 2–6 record.

== Schedule ==
Date	Opponent	Site	Result	Source
September 24	at Columbia	Baker Field; New York, NY	L 0–32	
October 1	at Harvard	Harvard Stadium; Boston, MA	L 3–21	
October 8	at Williams	Weston Field; Williamstown, MA	L 0–12	
October 15	Providence	Centennial Field; Burlington, VT	W 40–0	
October 22	Tufts	Centennial Field; Burlington, VT	L 0–22	
October 29	at Norwich	Sabine Field; Northfield, VT	L 0–13	
November 5	at Amherst	Pratt Field; Amherst, MA	No contest	
November 12	Middlebury	Centennial Field; Burlington, VT	W 13–7	
November 24	at Springfield (MA)	Pratt Field; Springfield, MA	L 0–24	
