= 1927 CCNY Lavender football team =

American college football season

1927 CCNY Lavender football
- Conference: Independent
- Record: 4–2–2
- Head coach: Harold J. Parker (4th season)
- Home stadium: Lewisohn Stadium

1927 Eastern college football independents records
	Conf.			Overall
Team	W	L	T	W		L		T
Tufts		–		8	–	0	–	0
Springfield		–		7	–	0	–	2
Washington & Jefferson		–		7	–	0	–	2
No. 6 Army		–		9	–	1	–	0
No. 2 Pittsburgh		–		8	–	1	–	1
Temple		–		7	–	1	–	0
No. 5 Yale		–		7	–	1	–	0
NYU		–		7	–	1	–	2
Princeton		–		6	–	1	–	0
Villanova		–		6	–	1	–	0
Penn State		–		6	–	2	–	1
Columbia		–		5	–	2	–	2
Bucknell		–		6	–	3	–	1
Colgate		–		4	–	2	–	3
CCNY		–		4	–	2	–	2
Lafayette		–		5	–	3	–	1
Penn		–		6	–	4	–	0
Syracuse		–		5	–	3	–	2
Carnegie Tech		–		5	–	4	–	1
Boston College		–		4	–	4	–	0
Harvard		–		4	–	4	–	0
Rutgers		–		4	–	4	–	0
Cornell		–		3	–	3	–	2
Boston University		–		3	–	4	–	1
Drexel		–		3	–	5	–	1
Fordham		–		3	–	5	–	0
Brown		–		3	–	6	–	1
Vermont		–		2	–	6	–	0
Providence		–		1	–	4	–	2
Franklin & Marshall		–		1	–	7	–	1
Lehigh		–		1	–	7	–	1
Rankings from Dickinson System

The 1927 CCNY Lavender football team was an American football team that represented the City College of New York (CCNY) as an independent during the 1927 college football season. In their fourth season under Harold J. Parker, the Lavender team compiled a 4–2–2 record.

== Schedule ==
Date	Opponent	Site	Result	Source
September 24	CCNY alumni	Lewisohn Stadium; New York, NY	W 9–0	
October 1	George Washington	Lewisohn Stadium; New York, NY	L 6–19	
October 8	at St. Lawrence	Weeks Field; Canton, NY	T 14–14	
October 15	Upsala	Lewisohn Stadium; New York, NY	W 79–0	
October 22	at Rhode Island State	Kingston, RI	W 20–19	
October 29	Gallaudet	Lewisohn Stadium; New York, NY	W 58–0	
November 5	Manhattan	Lewisohn Stadium; New York, NY	T 6–6	
November 12	Haverford	Lewisohn Stadium; New York, NY	L 0–13	
