= 1927 Penn State Nittany Lions football team =

American college football season

1927 Penn State Nittany Lions football
- Conference: Independent
- Record: 6–2–1
- Head coach: Hugo Bezdek (10th season)
- Captain: Johnny Roepke
- Home stadium: New Beaver Field

1927 Eastern college football independents records
	Conf.			Overall
Team	W	L	T	W		L		T
Tufts		–		8	–	0	–	0
Springfield		–		7	–	0	–	2
Washington & Jefferson		–		7	–	0	–	2
No. 6 Army		–		9	–	1	–	0
No. 2 Pittsburgh		–		8	–	1	–	1
Temple		–		7	–	1	–	0
No. 5 Yale		–		7	–	1	–	0
NYU		–		7	–	1	–	2
Princeton		–		6	–	1	–	0
Villanova		–		6	–	1	–	0
Penn State		–		6	–	2	–	1
Columbia		–		5	–	2	–	2
Bucknell		–		6	–	3	–	1
Colgate		–		4	–	2	–	3
CCNY		–		4	–	2	–	2
Lafayette		–		5	–	3	–	1
Penn		–		6	–	4	–	0
Syracuse		–		5	–	3	–	2
Carnegie Tech		–		5	–	4	–	1
Boston College		–		4	–	4	–	0
Harvard		–		4	–	4	–	0
Rutgers		–		4	–	4	–	0
Cornell		–		3	–	3	–	2
Boston University		–		3	–	4	–	1
Drexel		–		3	–	5	–	1
Fordham		–		3	–	5	–	0
Brown		–		3	–	6	–	1
Vermont		–		2	–	6	–	0
Providence		–		1	–	4	–	2
Franklin & Marshall		–		1	–	7	–	1
Lehigh		–		1	–	7	–	1
Rankings from Dickinson System

The 1927 Penn State Nittany Lions football team represented the Pennsylvania State University as an independent during the 1927 college football season. The team was coached by Hugo Bezdek and played its home games in New Beaver Field in State College, Pennsylvania.

== Schedule ==
Date	Opponent	Site	Result	Attendance	Source
September 24	Lebanon Valley	New Beaver Field; State College, PA	W 27–0	3,500	
October 1	Gettysburg	New Beaver Field; State College, PA	W 34–13	4,000	
October 8	Bucknell	New Beaver Field; State College, PA	L 7–13	5,000	
October 15	at Penn	Franklin Field; Philadelphia, PA	W 20–0	60,000	
October 22	at Syracuse	Archbold Stadium; Syracuse, NY (rivalry)	W 9–6	25,000	
October 29	Lafayette^{†}	New Beaver Field; State College, PA	W 40–6	11,000	
November 5	George Washington	New Beaver Field; State College, PA	W 13–0	3,500	
November 12	NYU	New Beaver Field; State College, PA	T 13–13	12,000	
November 24	at Pittsburgh	Pitt Stadium; Pittsburgh, PA (rivalry)	L 0–30	57,051	
^{†}Homecoming
