= 1927 Washington & Jefferson Presidents football team =

American college football season

1927 Washington & Jefferson Presidents football
- Conference: Independent
- Record: 7–0–2
- Head coach: Andrew Kerr (2nd season)

1927 Eastern college football independents records
	Conf.			Overall
Team	W	L	T	W		L		T
Tufts		–		8	–	0	–	0
Springfield		–		7	–	0	–	2
Washington & Jefferson		–		7	–	0	–	2
No. 6 Army		–		9	–	1	–	0
No. 2 Pittsburgh		–		8	–	1	–	1
Temple		–		7	–	1	–	0
No. 5 Yale		–		7	–	1	–	0
NYU		–		7	–	1	–	2
Princeton		–		6	–	1	–	0
Villanova		–		6	–	1	–	0
Penn State		–		6	–	2	–	1
Columbia		–		5	–	2	–	2
Bucknell		–		6	–	3	–	1
Colgate		–		4	–	2	–	3
CCNY		–		4	–	2	–	2
Lafayette		–		5	–	3	–	1
Penn		–		6	–	4	–	0
Syracuse		–		5	–	3	–	2
Carnegie Tech		–		5	–	4	–	1
Boston College		–		4	–	4	–	0
Harvard		–		4	–	4	–	0
Rutgers		–		4	–	4	–	0
Cornell		–		3	–	3	–	2
Boston University		–		3	–	4	–	1
Drexel		–		3	–	5	–	1
Fordham		–		3	–	5	–	0
Brown		–		3	–	6	–	1
Vermont		–		2	–	6	–	0
Providence		–		1	–	4	–	2
Franklin & Marshall		–		1	–	7	–	1
Lehigh		–		1	–	7	–	1
Rankings from Dickinson System

The 1927 Washington & Jefferson Presidents football team was an American football team that represented Washington & Jefferson College as an independent during the 1927 college football season. In their second season under head coach Andrew Kerr, the Presidents compiled a 7–0–2 record, shut out five of nine opponents, and outscored all opponents by a total of 152 to 21. They defeated regional powers Western Maryland (15–6), Carnegie Tech (20–6), Lafayette (14–0), and Bucknell (19–3), and tied with Pittsburgh (0–0) and West Virginia (6–6).

Washington & Jefferson's notable players included:

- Tackle Jap Douds received first-team All-America honors from Charles Parker of the New York Evening Telegram. He also received second-team All-America honors from the International News Service (INS).
- Fullback Bill Amos received second-team All-America honors from the Hearst newspaper syndicate and third-team honors from the Associated Press (AP). Amos also received first-team honors from the AP and United Press (UP) on the 1927 All-Eastern football team. Amos was also the team captain.

== Schedule ==
Date	Opponent	Site	Result	Attendance	Source
September 24	Waynesburg	Washington, PA	W 14–0		
October 1	Western Maryland	Washington, PA	W 15–6		
October 8	Bethany (WV)	Washington, PA	W 31–0		
October 15	at Carnegie Tech	Pittsburgh, PA	W 20–6	20,000	
October 22	at Lafayette	Fisher Field; Easton, PA	W 14–0	18,000	
October 29	Thiel	Washington, PA	W 33–0		
November 5	at Pittsburgh	Pitt Stadium; Pittsburgh, PA	T 0–0	50,000–52,000	
November 12	at Bucknell	Memorial Stadium; Lewisburg, PA	W 19–3	15,000	
November 24	at West Virginia	Mountaineer Field; Morgantown, WV	T 6–6	15,000	
