= 1927 Penn Quakers football team =

American college football season

1927 Penn Quakers football
- Conference: Independent
- Record: 6–4
- Head coach: Lou Young (5th season)
- Captain: Ed Hake
- Home stadium: Franklin Field

1927 Eastern college football independents records
	Conf.			Overall
Team	W	L	T	W		L		T
Tufts		–		8	–	0	–	0
Springfield		–		7	–	0	–	2
Washington & Jefferson		–		7	–	0	–	2
No. 6 Army		–		9	–	1	–	0
No. 2 Pittsburgh		–		8	–	1	–	1
Temple		–		7	–	1	–	0
No. 5 Yale		–		7	–	1	–	0
NYU		–		7	–	1	–	2
Princeton		–		6	–	1	–	0
Villanova		–		6	–	1	–	0
Penn State		–		6	–	2	–	1
Columbia		–		5	–	2	–	2
Bucknell		–		6	–	3	–	1
Colgate		–		4	–	2	–	3
CCNY		–		4	–	2	–	2
Lafayette		–		5	–	3	–	1
Penn		–		6	–	4	–	0
Syracuse		–		5	–	3	–	2
Carnegie Tech		–		5	–	4	–	1
Boston College		–		4	–	4	–	0
Harvard		–		4	–	4	–	0
Rutgers		–		4	–	4	–	0
Cornell		–		3	–	3	–	2
Boston University		–		3	–	4	–	1
Drexel		–		3	–	5	–	1
Fordham		–		3	–	5	–	0
Brown		–		3	–	6	–	1
Vermont		–		2	–	6	–	0
Providence		–		1	–	4	–	2
Franklin & Marshall		–		1	–	7	–	1
Lehigh		–		1	–	7	–	1
Rankings from Dickinson System

The 1927 Penn Quakers football team was an American football team that represented the University of Pennsylvania as an independent during the 1927 college football season. In their fifth season under head coach Lou Young, the Quakers compiled a 6–4 record, shut out five of ten opponents, and outscored all opponents by a total of 167 to 78. The team played its home games at Franklin Field in Philadelphia.

== Schedule ==
Date	Opponent	Site	Result	Attendance	Source
September 24	Franklin & Marshall	Franklin Field; Philadelphia, PA	W 8–0		
October 1	Swarthmore	Franklin Field; Philadelphia, PA	W 33–0		
October 8	Brown	Franklin Field; Philadelphia, PA	W 14–6		
October 15	Penn State	Franklin Field; Philadelphia, PA	L 0–20	60,000	
October 22	at Chicago	Stagg Field; Chicago, IL	L 7–13	45,000	
October 29	Navy	Franklin Field; Philadelphia, PA	L 6–12		
November 5	Harvard	Franklin Field; Philadelphia, PA (rivalry)	W 24–0		
November 12	Columbia	Franklin Field; Philadelphia, PA	W 27–0		
November 24	Cornell	Franklin Field; Philadelphia, PA (rivalry)	W 35–0		
December 31	at California	California Memorial Stadium; Berkeley, CA	L 13–27		
