= 1927 Lafayette Leopards football team =

American football club

1927 Lafayette Leopards football
- Conference: Independent
- Record: 5–3–1
- Head coach: Herb McCracken (4th season)
- Captains: Harold Cothran; William Atkinson
- Home stadium: Fisher Field

1927 Eastern college football independents records
	Conf.			Overall
Team	W	L	T	W		L		T
Tufts		–		8	–	0	–	0
Springfield		–		7	–	0	–	2
Washington & Jefferson		–		7	–	0	–	2
No. 6 Army		–		9	–	1	–	0
No. 2 Pittsburgh		–		8	–	1	–	1
Temple		–		7	–	1	–	0
No. 5 Yale		–		7	–	1	–	0
NYU		–		7	–	1	–	2
Princeton		–		6	–	1	–	0
Villanova		–		6	–	1	–	0
Penn State		–		6	–	2	–	1
Columbia		–		5	–	2	–	2
Bucknell		–		6	–	3	–	1
Colgate		–		4	–	2	–	3
CCNY		–		4	–	2	–	2
Lafayette		–		5	–	3	–	1
Penn		–		6	–	4	–	0
Syracuse		–		5	–	3	–	2
Carnegie Tech		–		5	–	4	–	1
Boston College		–		4	–	4	–	0
Harvard		–		4	–	4	–	0
Rutgers		–		4	–	4	–	0
Cornell		–		3	–	3	–	2
Boston University		–		3	–	4	–	1
Drexel		–		3	–	5	–	1
Fordham		–		3	–	5	–	0
Brown		–		3	–	6	–	1
Vermont		–		2	–	6	–	0
Providence		–		1	–	4	–	2
Franklin & Marshall		–		1	–	7	–	1
Lehigh		–		1	–	7	–	1
Rankings from Dickinson System

The 1927 Lafayette Leopards football team was an American football team that represented Lafayette College as an independent during the 1927 college football season. In its fourth season under head coach Herb McCracken, the team compiled a 5–3–1 record. Harold Cothran and William Atkinson were the team captains. The team played its home games at Fisher Field in Easton, Pennsylvania.

== Schedule ==
Date	Opponent	Site	Result	Attendance	Source
September 24	Schuylkill	Fisher Field; Easton, PA	W 39–13		
October 1	Muhlenberg	Fisher Field; Easton, PA	W 38–7		
October 8	Rutgers	Fisher Field; Easton, PA	W 56–0		
October 15	at West Virginia	Mountaineer Field; Morgantown, WV	T 7–7		
October 22	Washington & Jefferson	Fisher Field; Easton, PA	L 0–14	18,000	
October 29	at Penn State	New Beaver Field; State College, PA	L 6–40	11,000	
November 5	at Georgetown	Griffith Stadium; Washington, DC	L 2–27		
November 12	Susquehanna	Fisher Field; Easton, PA	W 73–6		
November 19	at Lehigh	Bethlehem, PA (rivalry)	W 43–0		
