= 1927 Syracuse Orangemen football team =

American college football season

1927 Syracuse Orangemen football
- Conference: Independent
- Record: 5–3–2
- Head coach: Lew Andreas (1st season)
- Captain: Ray Barbuti
- Home stadium: Archbold Stadium

1927 Eastern college football independents records
	Conf.			Overall
Team	W	L	T	W		L		T
Tufts		–		8	–	0	–	0
Springfield		–		7	–	0	–	2
Washington & Jefferson		–		7	–	0	–	2
No. 6 Army		–		9	–	1	–	0
No. 2 Pittsburgh		–		8	–	1	–	1
Temple		–		7	–	1	–	0
No. 5 Yale		–		7	–	1	–	0
NYU		–		7	–	1	–	2
Princeton		–		6	–	1	–	0
Villanova		–		6	–	1	–	0
Penn State		–		6	–	2	–	1
Columbia		–		5	–	2	–	2
Bucknell		–		6	–	3	–	1
Colgate		–		4	–	2	–	3
CCNY		–		4	–	2	–	2
Lafayette		–		5	–	3	–	1
Penn		–		6	–	4	–	0
Syracuse		–		5	–	3	–	2
Carnegie Tech		–		5	–	4	–	1
Boston College		–		4	–	4	–	0
Harvard		–		4	–	4	–	0
Rutgers		–		4	–	4	–	0
Cornell		–		3	–	3	–	2
Boston University		–		3	–	4	–	1
Drexel		–		3	–	5	–	1
Fordham		–		3	–	5	–	0
Brown		–		3	–	6	–	1
Vermont		–		2	–	6	–	0
Providence		–		1	–	4	–	2
Franklin & Marshall		–		1	–	7	–	1
Lehigh		–		1	–	7	–	1
Rankings from Dickinson System

The 1927 Syracuse Orangemen football team represented Syracuse University as an independent during the 1927 college football season. The Orangemen were led by first-year head coach Lew Andreas and played their home games at Archbold Stadium in Syracuse, New York. Team captain and fullback Ray Barbuti was also captain of Syracuse's athletics team, and he won two gold medals in sprinting at the 1928 Summer Olympics.

== Schedule ==
Date	Time	Opponent	Site	Result	Attendance	Source
September 24		Hobart	Archbold Stadium; Syracuse, NY	W 13–0	8,000	
October 1		William & Mary	Archbold Stadium; Syracuse, NY	W 18–0		
October 8		Johns Hopkins	Archbold Stadium; Syracuse, NY	W 21–6	5,000	
October 15		Georgetown	Archbold Stadium; Syracuse, NY	W 19–6	15,000	
October 22		Penn State	Archbold Stadium; Syracuse, NY (rivalry)	L 6–9	15,000	
October 29		at Nebraska	Memorial Stadium; Lincoln, NE	L 0–21	27,000	
November 5		Ohio Wesleyan	Archbold Stadium; Syracuse, NY	T 6–6		
November 12		Colgate	Archbold Stadium; Syracuse, NY (rivalry)	T 13–13	32,000	
November 19		Niagara	Archbold Stadium; Syracuse, NY	W 13–6	4,000	
November 24	2:00 p.m.	at Columbia	Polo Grounds; New York, NY	L 7–14	35,000	
All times are in Eastern time
