= 1927 Yale Bulldogs football team =

American college football season

1927 Yale Bulldogs football
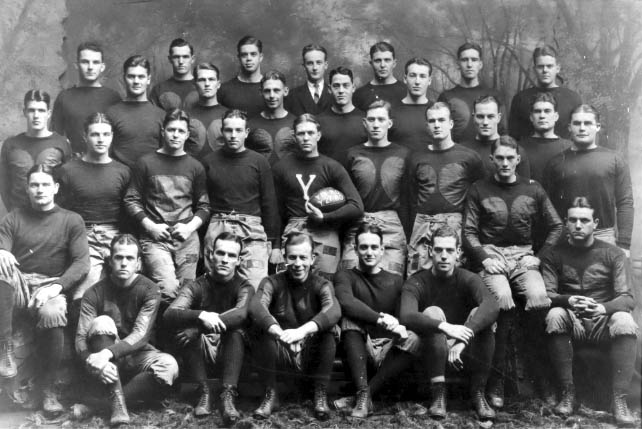

National champion (Boand System, CFRA)
- Conference: Independent
- Record: 7–1
- Head coach: Tad Jones (10th season)
- Offensive scheme: Single-wing
- Captain: Bill Webster
- Home stadium: Yale Bowl

1927 Eastern college football independents records
	Conf.			Overall
Team	W	L	T	W		L		T
Tufts		–		8	–	0	–	0
Springfield		–		7	–	0	–	2
Washington & Jefferson		–		7	–	0	–	2
No. 6 Army		–		9	–	1	–	0
No. 2 Pittsburgh		–		8	–	1	–	1
Temple		–		7	–	1	–	0
No. 5 Yale		–		7	–	1	–	0
NYU		–		7	–	1	–	2
Princeton		–		6	–	1	–	0
Villanova		–		6	–	1	–	0
Penn State		–		6	–	2	–	1
Columbia		–		5	–	2	–	2
Bucknell		–		6	–	3	–	1
Colgate		–		4	–	2	–	3
CCNY		–		4	–	2	–	2
Lafayette		–		5	–	3	–	1
Penn		–		6	–	4	–	0
Syracuse		–		5	–	3	–	2
Carnegie Tech		–		5	–	4	–	1
Boston College		–		4	–	4	–	0
Harvard		–		4	–	4	–	0
Rutgers		–		4	–	4	–	0
Cornell		–		3	–	3	–	2
Boston University		–		3	–	4	–	1
Drexel		–		3	–	5	–	1
Fordham		–		3	–	5	–	0
Brown		–		3	–	6	–	1
Vermont		–		2	–	6	–	0
Providence		–		1	–	4	–	2
Franklin & Marshall		–		1	–	7	–	1
Lehigh		–		1	–	7	–	1
Rankings from Dickinson System

The 1927 Yale Bulldogs football team was an American football team that represented Yale University as an independent during the 1927 college football season. The team finished with a 7–1 record, shut out four opponents, and outscored all opponents by a total of 157 to 32. The team was rated as one of the greatest to ever represent Yale. The team included two consensus All-Americans (John Charlesworth and Bill Webster) and was retroactively recognized by the Boand System and College Football Researchers Association as the national champion for 1927. The team was ranked No. 5 in the nation in the Dickinson System ratings released in December 1927.

== Schedule ==
Date	Opponent	Site	Result	Attendance	Source
October 1	Bowdoin	Yale Bowl; New Haven, CT	W 41–0		
October 8	Georgia	Yale Bowl; New Haven, CT	L 10–14	20,000	
October 15	Brown	Yale Bowl; New Haven, CT	W 19–0	40,000	
October 22	Army	Yale Bowl; New Haven, CT	W 10–6	78,000	
October 29	Dartmouth	Yale Bowl; New Haven, CT	W 19–0		
November 5	Maryland	Yale Bowl; New Haven, CT	W 30–6		
November 12	Princeton	Yale Bowl; New Haven, CT (rivalry)	W 14–6	80,000	
November 19	at Harvard	Harvard Stadium; Boston, MA (rivalry)	W 14–0		

== National championship debate ==
After the season ended, sports writers debated over which college football team should be recognized as the national champion. The leading contenders were Yale, Illinois, and Georgia. Among selectors who have sought to name a retroactive national champion, most have chosen Illinois or Georgia. Yale was chosen in 1937 by the Boand System and later by the College Football Researchers Association.

In the second game of the season, Yale lost to Georgia in head-to-head competition. A Yale fumble at its own nine-yard line set up an early Georgia touchdown, and the Bulldogs led by a 14-to-10 score at halftime. Neither team was able to score in the second half. Later in the game, Yale drove toward a potential game-winning touchdown, but Yale halfback Bruce Caldwell fumbled as he was about to cross the goal line. Georgia was later shut out in the final game of the season in its rivalry game against Georgia Tech. Both teams ended the season with one loss.

== Key players ==
Halfback Bruce Caldwell was the team's leader on offense. After Caldwell had scored 47 points in early games, Princeton challenged Caldwell's eligibility on grounds that he had played in two games while a freshman at Brown. As a result, Caldwell was not permitted to play in the final two games against Princeton and Harvard.

The line included two players who were consensus first-team picks on the 1927 All-America team: center John Charlesworth and guard Bill Webster. Charlesworth received first-team honors from, among others, Collier's Weekly as selected by Grantland Rice, the Newspaper Enterprise Association (NEA), and the United Press. Webster received the same honors from the All America Board, Associated Press, International News Service selected by Davis Walsh, North American Newspaper Alliance, and NEA.

== Roster ==
- Hubert S. Aldrich
- William J. Barrett
- Frederick Beck
- Louis J. Benton
- Karl F. Billhardt
- Curtis H. Brockelman
- Rufus C. Brown
- Bruce Caldwell
- Ralph W. Carson
- John Charlesworth
- Randolph H. Cook
- Briant S. Cookman
- Duncan B. Cox
- George Crile, Jr.
- Scott J. Dow, Jr.
- Donald C. Dunham
- Maxon H. Eddy
- Donald L. Ferris
- Dwight B. Fishwick
- John P. Flaherty
- Alfred S. Foote
- Marshall W. Forrest
- Edward S. Fowler
- John J. Garvey
- Leonard F. Genz
- Charles F. Gill
- John F. Godman
- Earl Goodwine, Jr.
- Waldo W. Greene
- Samuel L. Gwin, Jr.
- Norman S. Hall
- Robert A. Hall
- William S. Hammersley
- Charles D. Harvey
- John J. Hoben
- Chauncey K. Hubbard
- Francis V. Keesling, Jr.
- Elmer A. Kell, Jr.
- Jacob E. Lampe
- Barton L. Mallory, Jr.
- Euclid Martin
- Frank L. Marting
- Herbert C. Miller, Jr.
- Ralph W. Miner
- Charles B. G. Murphy
- Franklin T. Oldt
- Sidney S. Quarrier
- William Reeves
- Frederick B. Ryan
- Harold C. Sandberg
- Stuart Sanger
- Olin A. Saunders
- Stewart P. Scott
- Robert E. Spiel
- John M. Sprigg
- Knowlton D. Stone
- Louis L. Stott
- Paul F. Switz
- Bill Webster
- John C. West
- Robert F. Wilson
