= 1927 Tufts Jumbos football team =

American college football season

1927 Tufts Jumbos football
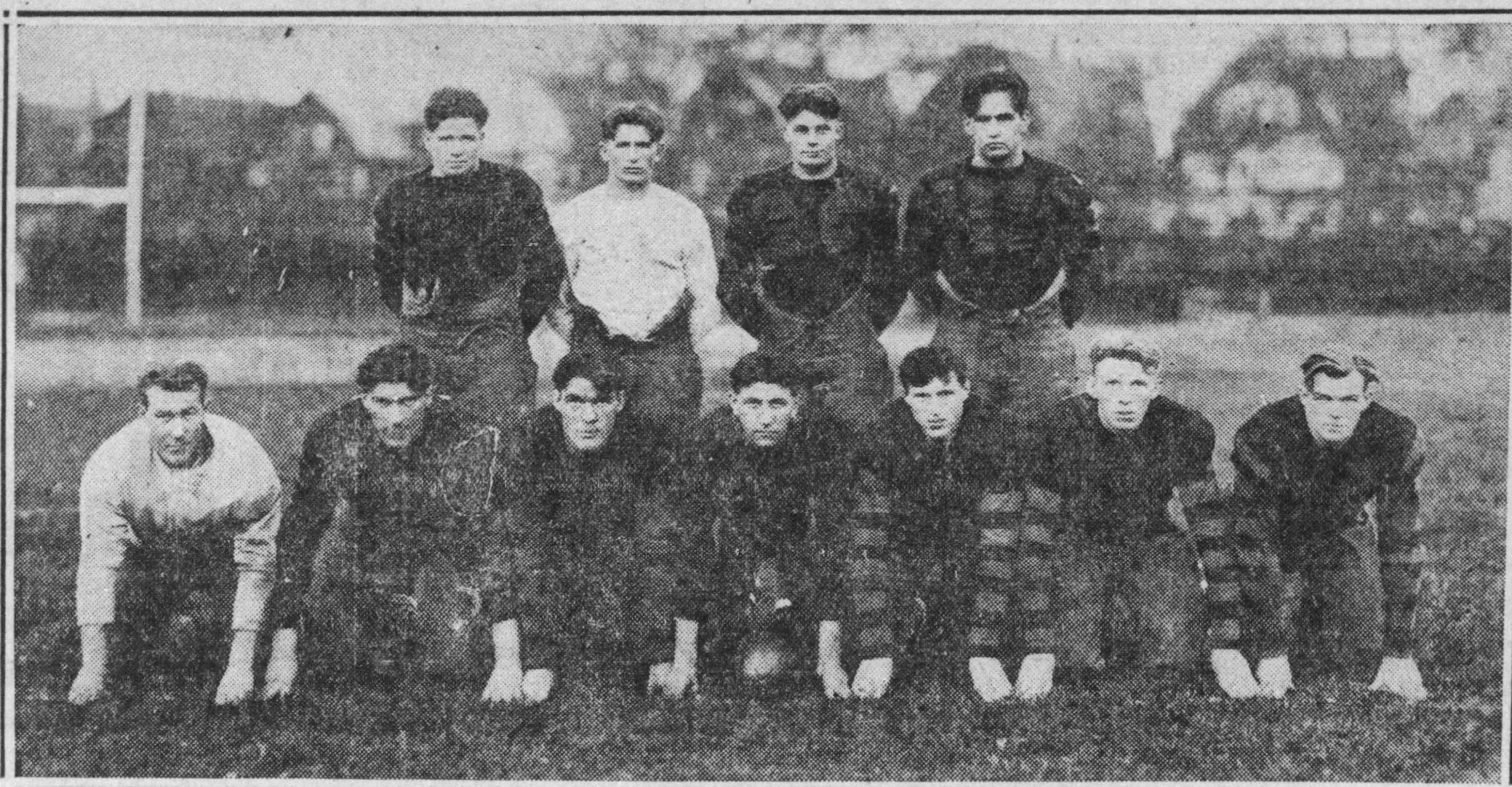
- Conference: Independent
- Record: 8–0
- Head coach: Arthur Sampson (2nd season)
- Captain: Melvin Bowker
- Home stadium: Tufts Oval

1927 Eastern college football independents records
	Conf.			Overall
Team	W	L	T	W		L		T
Tufts		–		8	–	0	–	0
Springfield		–		7	–	0	–	2
Washington & Jefferson		–		7	–	0	–	2
No. 6 Army		–		9	–	1	–	0
No. 2 Pittsburgh		–		8	–	1	–	1
Temple		–		7	–	1	–	0
No. 5 Yale		–		7	–	1	–	0
NYU		–		7	–	1	–	2
Princeton		–		6	–	1	–	0
Villanova		–		6	–	1	–	0
Penn State		–		6	–	2	–	1
Columbia		–		5	–	2	–	2
Bucknell		–		6	–	3	–	1
Colgate		–		4	–	2	–	3
CCNY		–		4	–	2	–	2
Lafayette		–		5	–	3	–	1
Penn		–		6	–	4	–	0
Syracuse		–		5	–	3	–	2
Carnegie Tech		–		5	–	4	–	1
Boston College		–		4	–	4	–	0
Harvard		–		4	–	4	–	0
Rutgers		–		4	–	4	–	0
Cornell		–		3	–	3	–	2
Boston University		–		3	–	4	–	1
Drexel		–		3	–	5	–	1
Fordham		–		3	–	5	–	0
Brown		–		3	–	6	–	1
Vermont		–		2	–	6	–	0
Providence		–		1	–	4	–	2
Franklin & Marshall		–		1	–	7	–	1
Lehigh		–		1	–	7	–	1
Rankings from Dickinson System

The 1927 Tufts Jumbos football team was an American football team that represented Tufts University of Somerville, Massachusetts, as an independent during the 1927 college football season. In their second year under head coach Arthur Sampson, the Jumbos compiled a perfect 8–0 record and outscored opponents by a total of 218 to 19. On defense, they shut out five of eight opponents and gave up an average of only 2.4 points per game. Tufts was the only undefeated and untied team in the East.

Quarterback Fred "Fish" Ellis led the team in scoring with 80 points. Ellis was also rated as "a great punter" and a runner who "in the open field has few equals." Ellis later served as the head coach of Tufts' football team from 1946 to 1953.

Tufts has been playing college football since 1875. The 1927 team was one of only three in Tufts football history to complete a perfect season. The other two were the 1934 and 1979 Tufts football teams.

== Schedule ==
Date	Time	Opponent	Site	Result	Source
October 1		Lowell Textile	Tufts Oval; Medford, MA	W 40–0	
October 8		Bates	Tufts Oval; Medford, MA	W 28–0	
October 15		Middlebury	Tufts Oval; Medford, MA	W 16–7	
October 22		at Vermont	Centennial Field; Burlington, VT	W 22–0	
October 29	2:00 p.m.	Boston University	Tufts Oval; Medford, MA	W 9–6	
November 5	2:00 p.m.	at New Hampshire	Memorial Field; Durham, NH	W 39–0	
November 12		Bowdoin	Tufts Oval; Medford, MA	W 32–0	
November 19		at Massachusetts	Alumni Field; Amherst, MA	W 32–6	
All times are in Eastern time

== Players ==
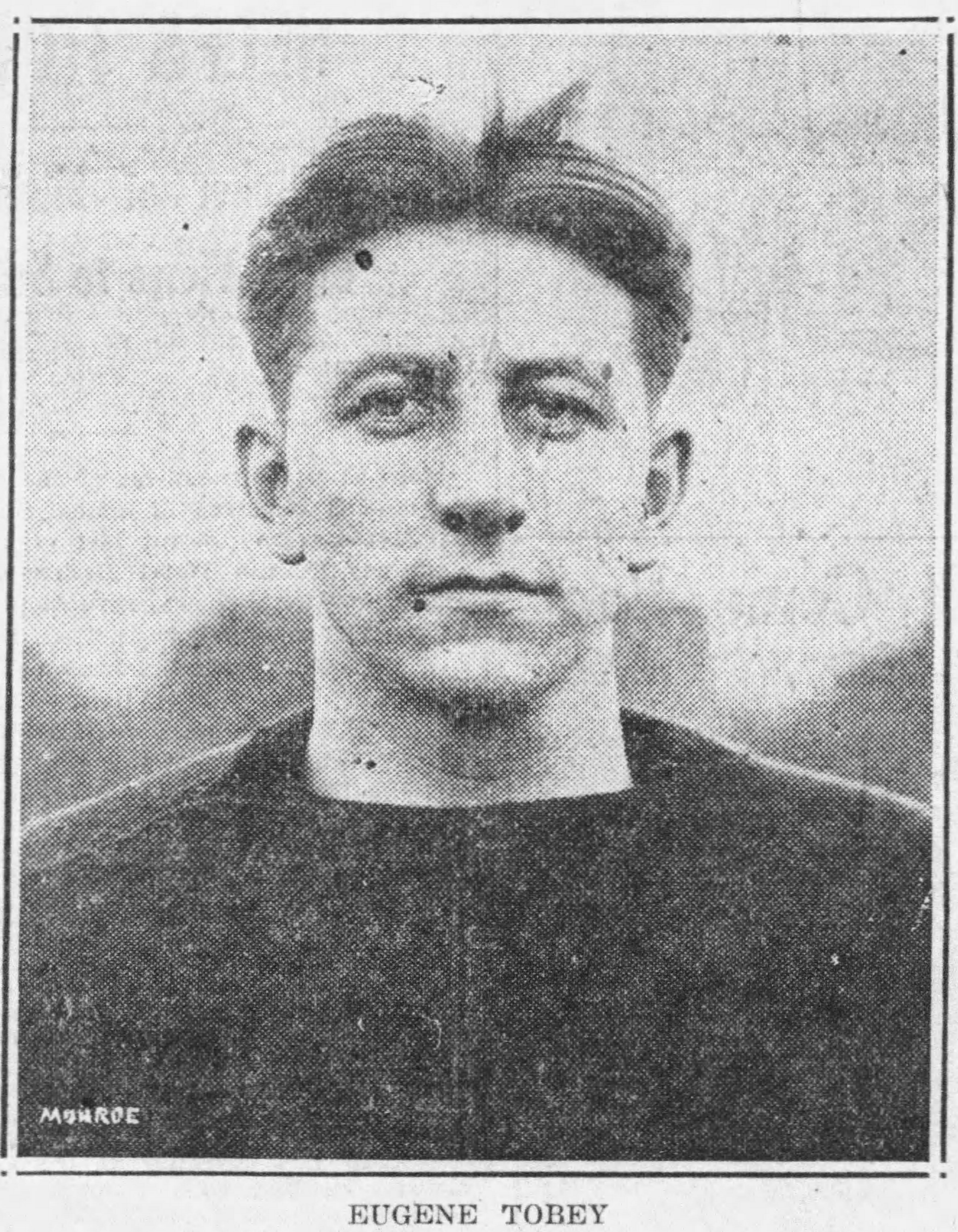
Eugene Toby

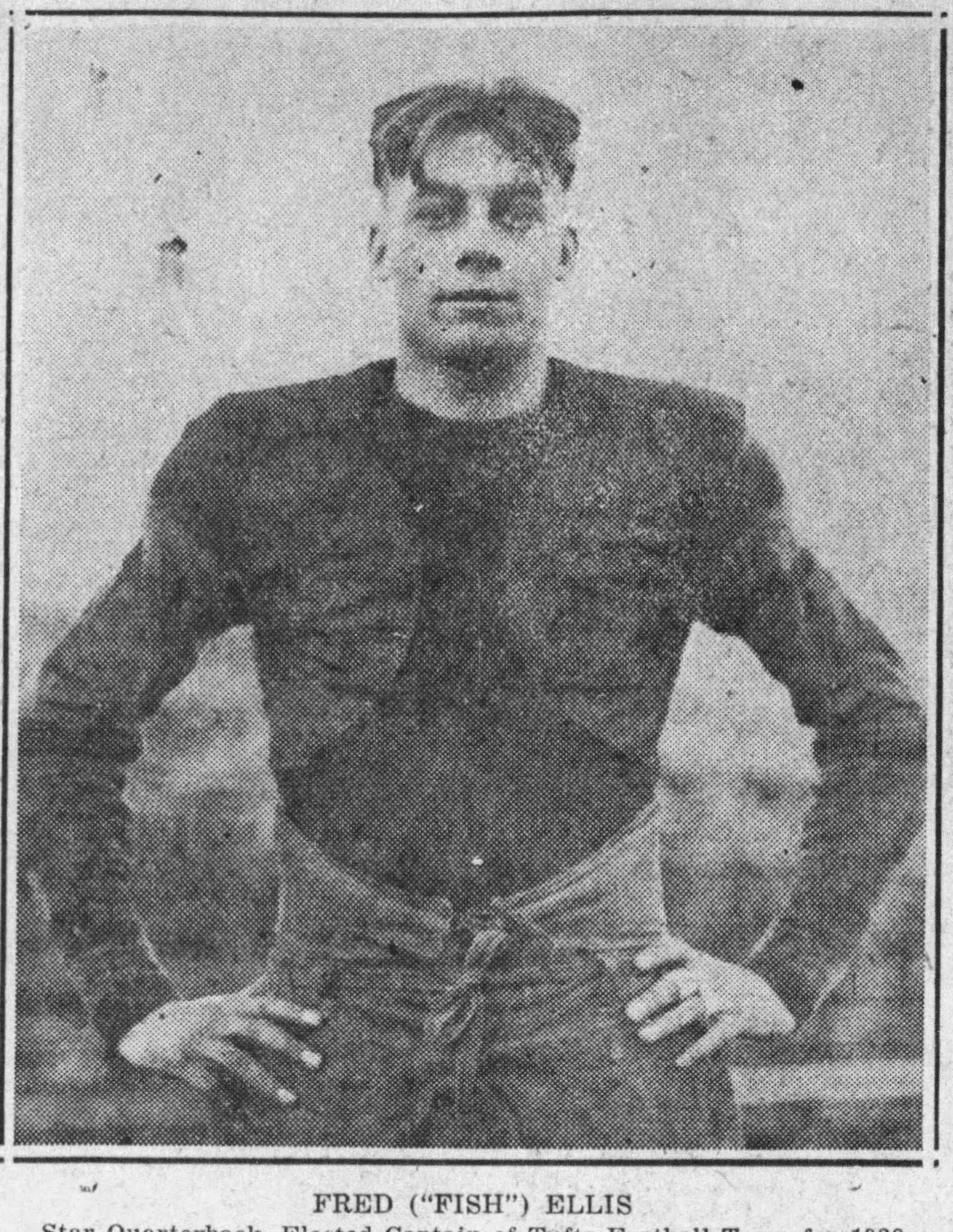
Fred "Fish" Ellis

- Leo Appiani, halfback
- Austin, end
- Mel Bowker, end and captain
- Earnie Brehaut, center
- Fred "Fish" Ellis, quarterback
- Ralph Fellows, halfback
- Jim Fitzgerald, tackle
- Ralph Hanson, tackle/guard
- Charlie Hingston, halfback
- Fred Kennedy, halfback
- Robert "Red" Marshall, fullback
- Melly, guard
- Karl Soule, tackle
- Eugene Tobey, center
