= 1927 Missouri Valley Intercollegiate Athletic Association football season =

- League: Missouri Valley Intercollegiate Athletic Association
- Sport: football
- Duration: September 24–November 26
- Teams: 10

Regular season
- Conference champion: Missouri

Seasons
- 1926 1928 (Big Six); 1928 (MVC)

1927 Missouri Valley Conference football standings
	Conf.					Overall
Team	W		L		T	W		L		T
Missouri $	5	–	1	–	0	7	–	2	–	0
No. 9 Nebraska	4	–	1	–	0	6	–	2	–	0
Oklahoma A&M	2	–	1	–	0	4	–	4	–	0
Iowa State	3	–	2	–	0	4	–	3	–	1
Washington University	2	–	2	–	1	5	–	2	–	2
Kansas	3	–	3	–	1	3	–	4	–	1
Oklahoma	2	–	3	–	0	3	–	3	–	2
Kansas State	2	–	4	–	0	3	–	5	–	0
Drake	1	–	2	–	0	3	–	6	–	0
Grinnell	0	–	5	–	0	0	–	7	–	1
$ – Conference champion; Rankings from Dickinson System

The 1927 Missouri Valley Intercollegiate Athletic Association football season was the 21st season of Missouri Valley Intercollegiate Athletic Association football taking place during the 1927 college football season. The conference consisted of a record 10 member institutions. The champions were Missouri. Missouri had a conference win percentage of .833%. After the season, the conference split into the Big Six Conference, which officially kept the MVIAA name, and the Missouri Valley Conference. Both conferences claim the lineage of the MVIAA.

== Coaches ==
Team	Head coach	Years at school
Drake	Ossie Solem	7th
Grinnell	Lester Watt	1st
Iowa State	C. Noel Workman	2nd
Kansas	Franklin Cappon	2nd
Kansas State	Charlie Bachman	8th
Missouri	Gwinn Henry	5th
Nebraska	Ernest Bearg	3rd
Oklahoma	Adrian Lindsey	1st
Oklahoma A&M	John Maulbetsch	7th
Washington University	Bob Higgins	3rd

== Schedule ==
=== Week one ===
Date	Time	Visiting team	Home team	Site	TV	Result	Attendance	Ref.
September 24		William Penn	Grinnell			T 6–6		
September 24		Hays Teachers	Kansas State	Memorial Stadium • Manhattan, KS		W 30–6		
September 24		Lombard	Washington University	Francis Field • St. Louis, MO		W 6–0		
^{#}Rankings from AP Poll released prior to game.

=== Week two ===
Date	Time	Visiting team	Home team	Site	TV	Result	Attendance	Ref.
October 1		Kansas	Grinnell	Grinnell, IA		KU 19–0		
October 1		Iowa State	Nebraska	Memorial Stadium (Lincoln) • Lincoln, NE		NEB 6–0	10,000	
October 1		Kansas State	Missouri	Memorial Stadium • Columbia, MO		MIZ 13–6		
October 1		Oklahoma	Chicago	Stagg Field • Chicago, IL		W 13–7	25,000	
October 1		Oklahoma A&M	Washington University	Francis Field • St. Louis, MO		WASH U 6–0		
^{#}Rankings from AP Poll released prior to game.

=== Week three ===
Date	Time	Visiting team	Home team	Site	TV	Result	Attendance	Ref.
October 8		Drake	Navy	Farragut Field • Annapolis, MD		L 6–35		
October 8		Simpson	Iowa State	State Field • Ames, IA		W 26–6		
October 8		Wisconsin	Kansas	Memorial Stadium • Lawrence, KS		L 6–26		
October 8	2:30 p.m.	Nebraska	Missouri	Memorial Stadium • Columbia, MO		MIZ 7–6		
October 8		Oklahoma A&M	Minnesota	Memorial Stadium • Minneapolis, MN		L 0–40	35,000	
October 8		Missouri Mines	Washington University	Francis Field • St. Louis, MO		W 13–0		
^{#}Rankings from AP Poll released prior to game.

=== Week four ===
Date	Time	Visiting team	Home team	Site	TV	Result	Attendance	Ref.
October 15		Pittsburgh	Drake	Drake Stadium • Des Moines		L 0–32		
October 15	2:00 p.m.	Grinnell	Nebraska	Memorial Stadium • Lincoln, NE		NEB 58–0		
October 15		Iowa State	Illinois	Memorial Stadium • Champaign, IL		T 12–12	12,000	
October 15		Kansas State	Kansas	Memorial Stadium • Lawrence, KS		KS ST 13–2		
October 15		Missouri	Washington University	Francis Field • St. Louis, MO		MIZ 13–0		
October 15		Crieghton	Oklahoma	Owen Field • Norman, OK		T 13–13		
October 15		Marquette	Oklahoma A&M	Lewis Field • Stillwater, OK		W 8–0		
^{#}Rankings from AP Poll released prior to game.

=== Week five ===
Date	Time	Visiting team	Home team	Site	TV	Result	Attendance	Ref.
October 19		Simpson	Drake	Drake Stadium • Des Moines, IA		W 20–6		
October 22		Drake	Grinnell	Grinnell, IA		DRAKE 26–6		
October 22		Washington University	Kansas	Memorial Stadium • Lawrence, KS		T 21–21		
October 22		Oklahoma	Kansas State	World War I Memorial Stadium • Manhattan, KS		KS ST 20–14		
October 22		Missouri	SMU	Fair Park Stadium • Dallas, TX		L 9–32	12,000	
October 22		Tulsa	Oklahoma A&M	Lewis Field • Stillwater, OK		L 26–28		
^{#}Rankings from AP Poll released prior to game.

=== Week six ===
Date	Time	Visiting team	Home team	Site	TV	Result	Attendance	Ref.
October 29		Drake	Kansas	Memorial Stadium • Lawrence, KS		KU 7–6		
October 29		Grinnell	Marquette	Marquette Stadium • Milwaukee, WI		L 0–31	10,000	
October 29		Kansas State	Iowa State	State Field • Ames, IA		IA ST 12–7		
October 29		Missouri	Northwestern	Dyche Field • Evanston, IL		W 34–19		
October 29		Syracuse	Nebraska	Memorial Stadium • Lincoln, NE		W 21–0		
October 29		Oklahoma	Central State Teachers (OK)	Edmond, OK		T 14–14		
October 29		Creighton	Oklahoma A&M	Lewis Field • Stillwater, OK		W 18–6		
October 29		Westminster (MO)	Washington U	Francis Field • St. Louis, MO		T 6–6		
^{#}Rankings from AP Poll released prior to game.

=== Week seven ===
Date	Time	Visiting team	Home team	Site	TV	Result	Attendance	Ref.
November 5		Iowa State	Drake	Drake Stadium • Des Moines, IA		IA ST 7–6		
November 5		Grinnell	Wisconsin	Camp Randall Stadium • Madison, WI		L 2–20		
November 5		Kansas	Nebraska	Memorial Stadium • Lincoln, NE		NEB 47–13		
November 5		West Virginia	Missouri	Memorial Stadium • Columbia, MO		W 13–0		
November 5		Washington University	Oklahoma	Owen Field • Norman, OK		OU 23–7		
^{#}Rankings from AP Poll released prior to game.

=== Week eight ===
Date	Time	Visiting team	Home team	Site	TV	Result	Attendance	Ref.
November 11		Missouri	Iowa State	State Field • Ames, IA		MIZ 13–6		
November 11		Kansas State	Texas	War Memorial Stadium • Austin, TX		L 7–41		
November 12		Drake	Minnesota	Memorial Stadium • Minneapolis, MN		L 6–27		
November 12		Grinnell	Washington University	Francis Field • St. Louis, MO		WASH U 18–7		
November 12		Kansas	Oklahoma	Owen Field • Norman, OK		OU 26–7		
November 12	1:00 p.m.	Nebraska	Pittsburgh	Pitt Stadium • Pittsburgh, PA		L 13–21		
November 12		Arkansas	Oklahoma A&M	The Hill • Fayetteville, AR		L 20–33		
^{#}Rankings from AP Poll released prior to game.

=== Week nine ===
Date	Time	Visiting team	Home team	Site	TV	Result	Attendance	Ref.
November 19		Notre Dame	Drake	Drake Stadium • Des Moines, IA		L 0–32		
November 19		Grinnell	Iowa State	State Field • Ames, IA		IA ST 14–0		
November 19		Missouri	Kansas	Memorial Stadium • Lawrence, KS		KU 14–7		
November 19	2:00 p.m.	Nebraska	Kansas State	Memorial Stadium • Manhattan, KS		NEB 33–0		
November 19		Oklahoma A&M	Oklahoma	Owen Field • Norman, OK		OA&M 7–13		
^{#}Rankings from AP Poll released prior to game.

=== Week ten ===
Date	Time	Visiting team	Home team	Site	TV	Result	Attendance	Ref.
November 24		Iowa State	Marquette	Marquette Stadium • Milwaukee, WI		L 0–34		
November 24		Oklahoma A&M	Kansas State	Memorial Stadium • Manhattan, KS		OAMU 25–18		
November 24		Oklahoma	Missouri	Memorial Stadium • Columbia, MO		MIZ 7–20		
November 24	2:00 p.m.	NYU	Nebraska	Memorial Stadium • Lincoln, NE		W 27–18	35,000	
November 24	2:00 p.m.	Washington University	Saint Louis	Sportsman's Park • St. Louis, MO		W 21–0	18,739	
November 26		Drake	UCLA	Los Angeles Memorial Coliseum • Los Angeles, CA		W 25–6		
^{#}Rankings from AP Poll released prior to game.

== See also ==
- 1927 All-Missouri Valley Conference football team
