= Senator Jenkins =

Senator Jenkins may refer to:

- Andrew Jenkins (politician) (born 1941), New York State Senate
- Bruce Sterling Jenkins (1927–2023), Utah State Senate
- Clark Jenkins (born 1948), North Carolina State Senate
- Dan Jenkins (politician) (1940–2007), Florida State Senate
- Evan Jenkins (politician) (born 1960), West Virginia State Senate
- George A. Jenkins (1818–1896), Wisconsin State Senate
- John Jenkins (American politician) (born 1952), Maine State Senate
- Lynn Jenkins (born 1963), Kansas State Senate
- Perry W. Jenkins (1867–1955), Wyoming State Senate
- Sam Jenkins (politician) (fl. 2010s–present), Louisiana State Senate
- Scott K. Jenkins (born 1950), Utah State Senate
- Thomas A. Jenkins (1880–1959), Ohio State Senate
- William Jenkins (Northern Ireland politician) (1904–1983), Senate of Northern Ireland
