= Al Paone =

American football player and sports coach

Biographical details
- Born: c. 1942

Playing career

Football
- 1960–1963: Simpson (IA)
- 1965: Des Moines Warriors
- Position: Linebacker

Coaching career (HC unless noted)

Football
- 1966–1968: Dowling Catholic HS (IA) (assistant)
- 1969–1970: Simpson (IA) (DC)
- 1971–1973: Simpson (IA)
- 1975: Colorado State (line)
- 1976: Colorado State (ends)

Baseball
- 1969: Simpson (IA)

Wrestling
- 1966–1969: Dowling Catholic HS (IA)

Head coaching record
- Overall: 9–15–3 (college football); 6–12 (college baseball)

Albert Paone (born c. 1942) is an American former football player and coach of football, baseball, and wrestling. He served as the head football coach at Simpson College in Indianola, Iowa from 1971 to 1973, compiling a record of 9–15–3. Paonoe was also the head baseball coach at Simpson for one season, in 1969, tallying a mark of 6–12. He played a single season of professional football for the Des Moines Warriors of the Professional Football League of America.

A native of Alliance, Ohio, Paone graduated from Simpson College in 1966. He was an assistant football coach and head wrestling coach at Dowling Catholic High School in West Des Moines, Iowa from 1966 until 1969, when he returned to Simpson as defensive coordinator for the football team under head coach John Sullivan. Paone was as an assistant football coach at Colorado State University from 1975 to 1976.

== Head coaching record ==
=== College football ===
Year	Team	Overall	Conference	Standing	Bowl/playoffs
Simpson Redmen (Iowa Conference) (1971–1973)
1971	Simpson	5–4	4–3	5th	
1972	Simpson	2–5–2	1–4–2	6th	
1973	Simpson	2–6–1	1–5–1	7th	
Simpson:		9–15–3	6–12–3		
Total:		9–15–3			
