= 1927 Drake Bulldogs football team =

American college football season

1927 Drake Bulldogs football
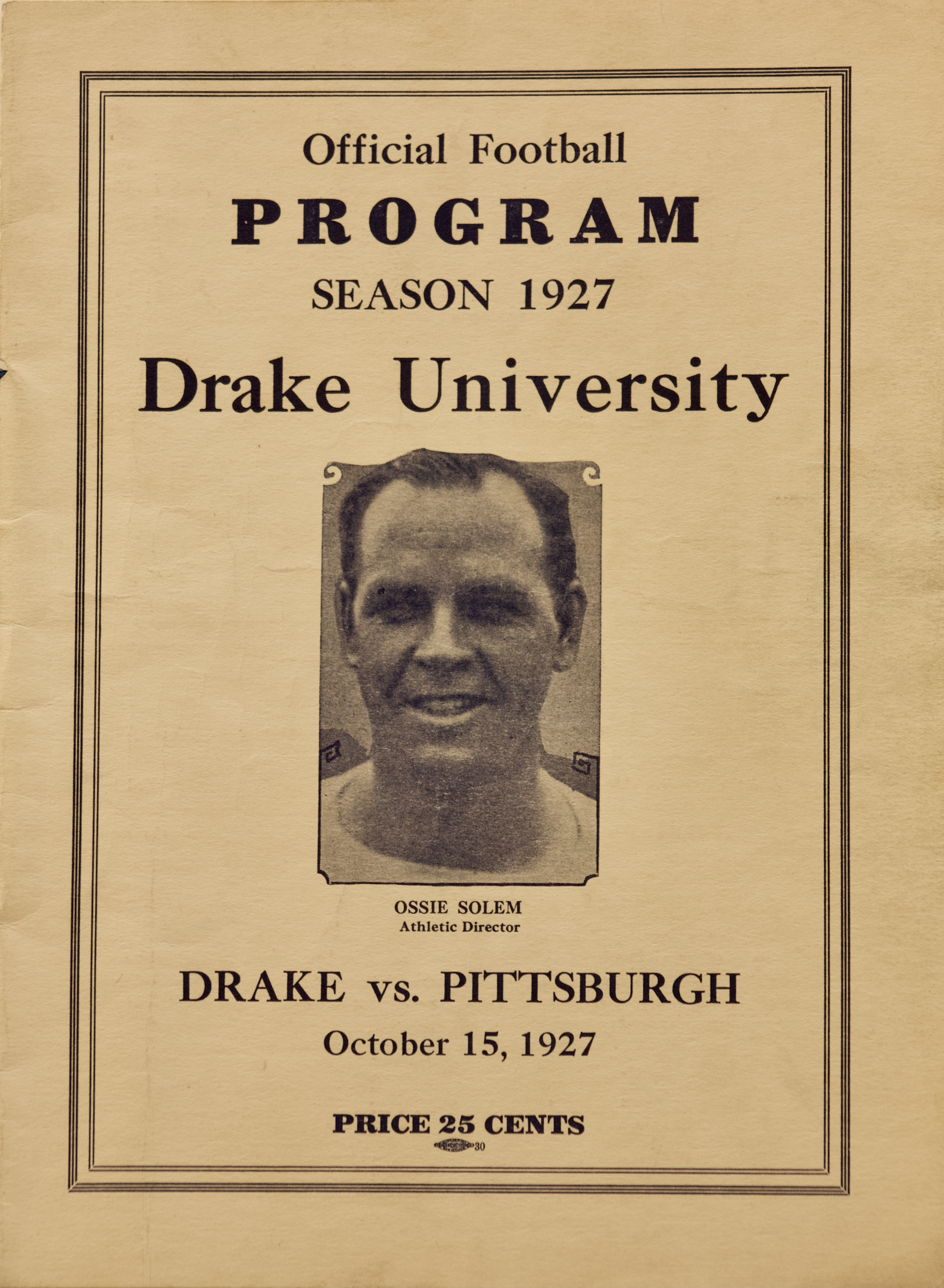
- Poster promoting the Official Football program
- Conference: Missouri Valley Conference
- Record: 3–6 (1–2 MVC)
- Head coach: Ossie Solem (7th season)
- Home stadium: Drake Stadium

1927 Missouri Valley Conference football standings
	Conf.					Overall
Team	W		L		T	W		L		T
Missouri $	5	–	1	–	0	7	–	2	–	0
No. 9 Nebraska	4	–	1	–	0	6	–	2	–	0
Oklahoma A&M	2	–	1	–	0	4	–	4	–	0
Iowa State	3	–	2	–	0	4	–	3	–	1
Washington University	2	–	2	–	1	5	–	2	–	2
Kansas	3	–	3	–	1	3	–	4	–	1
Oklahoma	2	–	3	–	0	3	–	3	–	2
Kansas State	2	–	4	–	0	3	–	5	–	0
Drake	1	–	2	–	0	3	–	6	–	0
Grinnell	0	–	5	–	0	0	–	7	–	1
$ – Conference champion; Rankings from Dickinson System

The 1927 Drake Bulldogs football team was an American football team that represented Drake University as a member of the Missouri Valley Conference (MVC) during the 1927 college football season. In their seventh season under head coach Ossie Solem, the Bulldogs compiled a 3–6 record (1–2 against MVC opponents), finished in ninth place out of ten teams in the MVC, and were outscored by a total of 158 to 89.

== Schedule ==
Date	Opponent	Site	Result	Attendance	Source
October 8	at Navy*	Farragut Field; Annapolis, MD	L 6–35		
October 15	Pittsburgh*	Drake Stadium; Des Moines, IA	L 0–32	7,000	
October 19	Simpson*	Drake Stadium; Des Moines, IA	W 20–6		
October 22	at Grinnell	Grinnell, IA	W 26–6		
October 29	at Kansas	Memorial Stadium; Lawrence, KS	L 6–7		
November 5	Iowa State	Drake Stadium; Des Moines, IA	L 0–7		
November 12	at Minnesota*	Memorial Stadium; Minneapolis, MN	L 6–27	18,000	
November 19	Notre Dame*	Drake Stadium; Des Moines, IA	L 0–32	8,412	
November 26	at UCLA*	Los Angeles Memorial Coliseum; Los Angeles, CA	W 25–6	10,000	
*Non-conference game
