= Heizer =

Heizer (German for "fireman") is a German surname. Notable people with the surname include:

- Ken Heizer (1924-2011), American football player
- Michael Heizer (born 1944), American artist
- Miles Heizer (born 1994), American actor
- Oscar S. Heizer (1868-1956), American diplomat
- Radomír Heizer (born 1987), Slovak ice hockey player
- Robert Heizer (1915-1979), American archaeologist

== See also ==
- Heizer, Kansas, a community in the United States
- Der Heizer, a short story by Franz Kafka
