= 1927 Oklahoma A&M Cowboys football team =

American college football season

1927 Oklahoma A&M Cowboys football
- Conference: Missouri Valley Conference
- Record: 4–4 (2–1 MVC)
- Head coach: John Maulbetsch (7th season)
- Home stadium: Lewis Field

1927 Missouri Valley Conference football standings
	Conf.					Overall
Team	W		L		T	W		L		T
Missouri $	5	–	1	–	0	7	–	2	–	0
No. 9 Nebraska	4	–	1	–	0	6	–	2	–	0
Oklahoma A&M	2	–	1	–	0	4	–	4	–	0
Iowa State	3	–	2	–	0	4	–	3	–	1
Washington University	2	–	2	–	1	5	–	2	–	2
Kansas	3	–	3	–	1	3	–	4	–	1
Oklahoma	2	–	3	–	0	3	–	3	–	2
Kansas State	2	–	4	–	0	3	–	5	–	0
Drake	1	–	2	–	0	3	–	6	–	0
Grinnell	0	–	5	–	0	0	–	7	–	1
$ – Conference champion; Rankings from Dickinson System

The 1927 Oklahoma A&M Cowboys football team represented Oklahoma A&M College—now known as Oklahoma State University–Stillwater—as a member of the Missouri Valley Conference during the 1927 college football season. Led by seventh-year head coach John Maulbetsch, the Cowboys compiled an overall record of 4–4 with a mark of 2–1 in conference play, placing third in the MVC. Oklahoma A&M played home games at Lewis Field in Stillwater, Oklahoma.

== Schedule ==
Date	Opponent	Site	Result	Attendance	Source
October 1	at Washington University	Francis Field; St. Louis, MO	L 0–6		
October 8	at Minnesota*	Memorial Stadium; Minneapolis, MN	L 0–40	35,000	
October 15	Marquette*	Lewis Field; Stillwater, OK	W 8–0	8,000	
October 22	Tulsa*	Lewis Field; Stillwater, OK (rivalry)	L 26–28		
October 29	Creighton*^{†}	Lewis Field; Stillwater, OK	W 18–6		
November 12	at Arkansas*	The Hill; Fayetteville, AR	L 20–33		
November 19	at Oklahoma	Memorial Stadium; Norman, OK (Bedlam)	W 13–7		
November 24	at Kansas State	Memorial Stadium; Manhattan, KS	W 25–18		
*Non-conference game; ^{†}Homecoming
