= 1927 Rice Owls football team =

American college football season

1927 Rice Owls football
- Conference: Southwest Conference
- Record: 2–6–1 (0–4 SWC)
- Head coach: John Heisman (4th season)
- Home stadium: Rice Field

1927 Southwest Conference football standings
	Conf.					Overall
Team	W		L		T	W		L		T
No. 11 Texas A&M $	4	–	0	–	1	8	–	0	–	1
SMU	4	–	1	–	0	7	–	2	–	0
Arkansas	2	–	1	–	0	8	–	1	–	0
Texas	2	–	2	–	1	6	–	2	–	1
TCU	1	–	2	–	2	4	–	3	–	2
Rice	1	–	3	–	0	2	–	6	–	1
Baylor	0	–	5	–	0	2	–	7	–	0
$ – Conference champion; Rankings from Dickinson System

The 1927 Rice Owls football team was an American football team that represented Rice Institute as a member of the Southwest Conference (SWC) during the 1927 college football season. In its fourth and final season under head coach John Heisman, the team compiled a 2–6–1 record (0–4 against SWC opponents) and was outscored by a total of 160 to 64.

== Schedule ==
Date	Opponent	Site	Result	Source
September 24	at Loyola (LA)*	Loyola University Stadium; New Orleans, LA	L 0–13	
October 1	Sam Houston State*	Rice Field; Houston, TX	W 20–13	
October 8	St. Edward's*	Rice Field; Houston, TX	T 0–0	
October 14	at SMU	Ownby Stadium; University Park, TX	L 6–34	
October 22	at Texas	War Memorial Stadium; Austin, TX	L 0–27	
October 29	Southwestern (TX)*	Rice Field; Houston, TX	L 12–14	
November 5	Centenary*	Rice Field; Houston, TX	L 7–35	
November 11	Texas A&M	Rice Field; Houston, TX	L 0–14	
November 24	Baylor	Rice Field; Houston, TX	W 19–12	
*Non-conference game
