= Reed Hoskins =

American football coach (born c. 1983)

Current position
- Title: Head coach
- Team: Simpson (IA)
- Conference: ARC
- Record: 18–22

Biographical details
- Born: c. 1983 (age 42–43); Grinnell, Iowa, U.S.
- Education: Wartburg College (2006)

Playing career
- 2002–2005: Wartburg
- Position: Quarterback

Coaching career (HC unless noted)
- 2006: North Carolina Wesleyan (assistant)
- 2007: St. Cloud State (assistant)
- 2008–2010: Wartburg (PGC/QB/WR)
- 2011–2015: Wisconsin–La Crosse (OC/QB)
- 2016–2022: Illinois Wesleyan (OC/QB)
- 2023–present: Simpson (IA)

Head coaching record
- Overall: 18–22

Reed Hoskins (born c. 1983) is an American college football coach. He is the head football coach for Simpson College, a position he has held since 2023. He also coached for North Carolina Wesleyan, St. Cloud State, Wartburg, Wisconsin–La Crosse, and Illinois Wesleyan. He played college football for Wartburg as a quarterback.

== Head coaching record ==
Year	Team	Overall	Conference	Standing	Bowl/playoffs
Simpson Storm (American Rivers Conference) (2023–present)
2023	Simpson	3–7	2–6	T–6th	
2024	Simpson	5–5	4–4	5th	
2025	Simpson	6–4	5–3	4th	
2026	Simpson	4–6	3–4	5th	
Simpson:		18–22	14–17		
Total:		18–22			
