= 1927 Texas A&M Aggies football team =

American college football season

1927 Texas A&M Aggies football

National champion (Sagarin) SWC champion
- Conference: Southwest Conference
- Record: 8–0–1 (4–0–1 SWC)
- Head coach: Dana X. Bible (10th season)
- Captain: Joel Hunt
- Home stadium: Kyle Field

1927 Southwest Conference football standings
	Conf.					Overall
Team	W		L		T	W		L		T
No. 11 Texas A&M $	4	–	0	–	1	8	–	0	–	1
SMU	4	–	1	–	0	7	–	2	–	0
Arkansas	2	–	1	–	0	8	–	1	–	0
Texas	2	–	2	–	1	6	–	2	–	1
TCU	1	–	2	–	2	4	–	3	–	2
Rice	1	–	3	–	0	2	–	6	–	1
Baylor	0	–	5	–	0	2	–	7	–	0
$ – Conference champion; Rankings from Dickinson System

The 1927 Texas A&M Aggies football team represented the Agricultural and Mechanical College of Texas—now known as Texas A&M University—as a member of the Southwest Conference (SWC) during the 1927 college football season. In their tenth season under head coach Dana X. Bible, the Aggies compiled an 8–0–1 record (4–0–1 against conference opponents), shut out five of nine opponents, and outscored all opponents by a total of 262 to 32.

There was no contemporaneous system in 1927 for determining a national champion. However, Texas A&M was retroactively named as the national champion for 1927 by Jeff Sagarin. Most selectors have named either Illinois or Georgia as the 1927 national champion. The team was ranked No. 11 in the nation in the Dickinson System ratings released in December 1927.

Two persons affiliated with the team were later inducted into the College Football Hall of Fame: coach Bible (inducted 1951); and quarterback Joel Hunt (inducted in 1967). Seven Texas A&M players were selected as first-team players on the 1927 All-Southwest Conference football team: Hunt; end Jules V. Sikes; tackles Lister and Sprott; guards Klepto Holmes and Figari; and center Bartlett.

== Schedule ==
Date	Opponent	Site	Result	Attendance	Source
September 24	Trinity (TX)*	Kyle Field; College Station, TX	W 45–0		
October 1	Southwestern (TX)*	Kyle Field; College Station, TX	W 31–0		
October 8	vs. Sewanee*	Fair Park Stadium; Dallas, TX	W 18–0	6,000	
October 15	Arkansas	Kyle Field; College Station, TX (rivalry)	W 40–6		
October 22	at TCU	Clark Field; Fort Worth, TX (rivalry)	T 0–0	13,000	
October 28	at Texas Tech*	Tech Field; Lubbock, TX (rivalry)	W 47–6		
November 5	SMU	Kyle Field; College Station, TX	W 39–13		
November 11	at Rice	Rice Field; Houston, TX	W 14–0		
November 24	Texas	Kyle Field; College Station, TX (rivalry)	W 28–7	27,000	
*Non-conference game

== Roster ==
- Alsabrook, HB
- Z. W. Bartlett, C
- Hershel Burgess, HB
- Conover, HB
- J. Dorsey, HB
- Figari, G
- Holleron, C
- Klepto Holmes, G
- Joel Hunt, QB
- Jefferies, FB
- W. S. Lister, T
- Thomas Mills, HB
- Petty, E
- Rektorik, G
- Rogers, G
- Jules V. Sikes, E
- Alton C. Sprott, T
- J. R. Varnell, FB
