= 1927 Oklahoma Sooners football team =

American college football season

1927 Oklahoma Sooners football
- Conference: Missouri Valley Conference
- Record: 3–3–2 (2–3 MVC)
- Head coach: Adrian Lindsey (1st season)
- Captain: Granville Norris
- Home stadium: Memorial Stadium

1927 Missouri Valley Conference football standings
	Conf.					Overall
Team	W		L		T	W		L		T
Missouri $	5	–	1	–	0	7	–	2	–	0
No. 9 Nebraska	4	–	1	–	0	6	–	2	–	0
Oklahoma A&M	2	–	1	–	0	4	–	4	–	0
Iowa State	3	–	2	–	0	4	–	3	–	1
Washington University	2	–	2	–	1	5	–	2	–	2
Kansas	3	–	3	–	1	3	–	4	–	1
Oklahoma	2	–	3	–	0	3	–	3	–	2
Kansas State	2	–	4	–	0	3	–	5	–	0
Drake	1	–	2	–	0	3	–	6	–	0
Grinnell	0	–	5	–	0	0	–	7	–	1
$ – Conference champion; Rankings from Dickinson System

The 1927 Oklahoma Sooners football team represented the University of Oklahoma as a member of the Missouri Valley Conference (MVC) during the 1927 college football season. In their first year under head coach Adrian Lindsey, the Sooners compiled am overall of record of 3–3–2 record with a mark of 2–3 in conference play, placing seventh in the MVC, and outscored opponents by a combined total of 117 to 101.

Tackle Granville Norris was recognized as an All-American, and end Roy LeCrone received all-conference honors.

== Schedule ==
Date	Opponent	Site	Result	Attendance	Source
October 1	at Chicago*	Stagg Field; Chicago, IL	W 13–7	25,000	
October 15	Creighton*	Memorial Stadium; Norman, OK	T 13–13		
October 22	at Kansas State	Memorial Stadium; Manhattan, KS	L 14–20		
October 29	at Central State Teachers*	Edmond, OK	T 14–14		
November 5	Washington University	Memorial Stadium; Norman, OK	W 23–7		
November 12	Kansas	Memorial Stadium; Norman, OK	W 26–7		
November 19	Oklahoma A&M	Memorial Stadium; Norman, OK (Bedlam)	L 7–13		
November 24	at Missouri	Memorial Stadium; Columbia, MO (rivalry)	L 7–20		
*Non-conference game

== Roster ==
1927 Oklahoma Sooners Football
Harry Berry; Mart Brown; Jack Carman; Tom Churchill; Sam Clammer; Frank Crider; Bruce Drake; Murray Gordon	W.C. Haller; Bill Hamilton; Summie Kidd; Leroy Lecrone; Ray Lecrone; Victor Marsh; Al Mayhew; Prentiss Mooney	Hal Muldrow; Granville Norris; Martin Philips; Gaciuis Short; Fred Smith; Leon Smith; Ben Taylor; Paul Ward
