= Adrian Lindsey =

American football player and sports coach (1895–1980)

Biographical details
- Born: August 15, 1895; Vienna, Illinois, U.S.
- Died: October 2, 1980 (aged 85); Eudora, Kansas, U.S.

Playing career

Football
- 1914–1916: Kansas
- Positions: Halfback, quarterback

Coaching career (HC unless noted)

Football
- 1919–1921: Kansas (assistant)
- 1922–1926: Bethany (KS)
- 1927–1931: Oklahoma
- 1932: Kansas (assistant)
- 1932–1938: Kansas

Baseball
- 1921: Kansas

Head coaching record
- Overall: 66–64–16 (football); 13–2 (baseball)

Accomplishments and honors

Championships
- 1 KCAC (1925)

Adrian Hobart "Ad" Lindsey (August 15, 1895 – October 2, 1980) was an American football player and coach of football and baseball. He served as the head football coach at Bethany College in Lindsborg, Kansas from 1922 to 1926, at the University of Oklahoma from 1927 to 1931, and at the University of Kansas from 1932 to 1938, compiling a career college football record of 66–64–16. Lindsey was also the head baseball coach at Kansas for one season in 1921, tallying a mark of 13–2.

== Early life ==
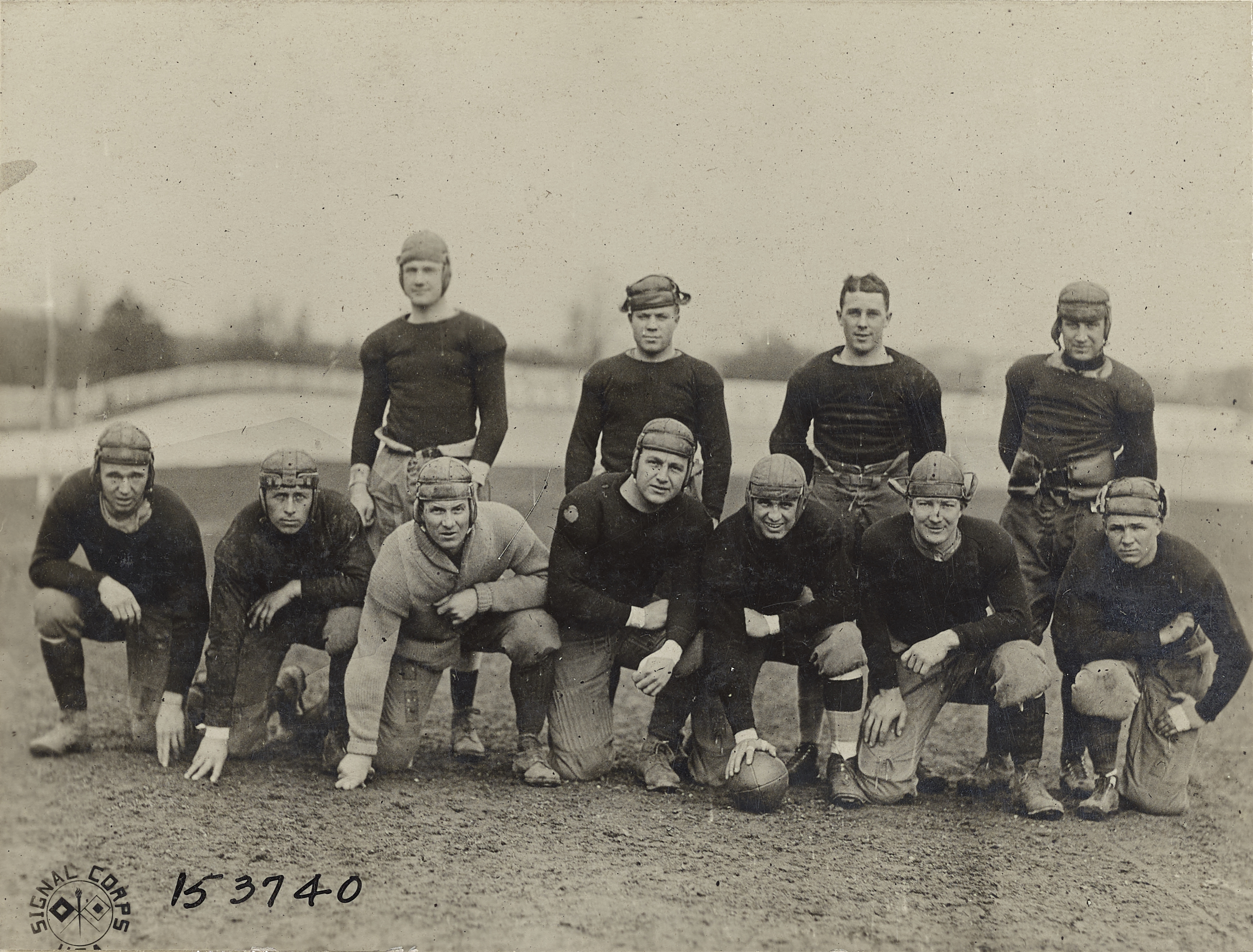
89th Division team, Lindsey at top left

Lindsey played football at the University of Kansas from 1914 to 1916. During World War I, he served as a U.S. Army officer in France. As part of the occupation force after the Armistice, Lindsey played right halfback for the 89th Division squad that won the AEF football championship in March 1919. Bob Higgins, Paul Withington, Charles Gerhardt and George Clark were also members of the squad.

== Coaching career ==
Lindsey began the 1932 season at Kansas as an assistant to Homer Woodson Hargiss. Hargiss was fired as head football coach on October 10, 1932, two days after the Jawhawks lost at home to Oklahoma, 21–6. Lindsey succeeded Hargiss as acting head coach with athletic director and head basketball coach Phog Allen overseeing the football program in a supervisory role.

== Head coaching record ==
=== Football ===
Year	Team	Overall	Conference	Standing
Bethany Terrible Swedes (Kansas Collegiate Athletic Conference) (1922–1926)
1922	Bethany	5–3	5–3	6th
1923	Bethany	2–7	2–7	13th
1924	Bethany	4–3–2	4–3–2	6th
1925	Bethany	7–0	7–0	T–1st
1926	Bethany	6–2	6–1	T–2nd
Bethany:		24–15–2	24–14–2	
Oklahoma Sooners (Missouri Valley Conference / Big Six Conference) (1927–1931)
1927	Oklahoma	3–3–2	2–3	7th
1928	Oklahoma	5–3	3–2	T–2nd
1929	Oklahoma	3–3–2	2–2–1	4th
1930	Oklahoma	4–3–1	3–1–1	2nd
1931	Oklahoma	4–7–1	1–4	T–5th
Oklahoma:		19–19–6	11–12–2	
Kansas Jayhawks (Big Six Conference) (1932–1938)
1932	Kansas	4–2 (Note: The first two games of the season were coached by Homer Woodson Hargiss.)	3–1	T–2nd
1933	Kansas	5–4–1	2–3	4th
1934	Kansas	3–4–3	1–2–2	4th
1935	Kansas	4–4–1	2–2–1	3rd
1936	Kansas	1–6–1	0–5	6th
1937	Kansas	3–4–2	2–1–2	3rd
1938	Kansas	3–6	1–4	6th
Kansas:		23–30–8	11–18–5	
Total:		66–64–16		
National championship Conference title Conference division title or championship game berth

== Baseball ==
Record table
Season	Team	Overall	Conference	Standing	Postseason
Kansas Jayhawks (Missouri Valley Intercollegiate Athletic Association) (1921)
1921	Kansas	13–2			
Kansas:		13–2 (.867)			
Total:		13–2 (.867)			
National champion Postseason invitational champion Conference regular season champion Conference regular season and conference tournament champion Division regular season champion Division regular season and conference tournament champion Conference tournament champion
