= 1927 Missouri Tigers football team =

American college football season

1927 Missouri Tigers football

MVC champion
- Conference: Missouri Valley Conference
- Record: 7–2 (5–1 MVC)
- Head coach: Gwinn Henry (5th season)
- Captain: George Flamank
- Home stadium: Memorial Stadium

1927 Missouri Valley Conference football standings
	Conf.					Overall
Team	W		L		T	W		L		T
Missouri $	5	–	1	–	0	7	–	2	–	0
No. 9 Nebraska	4	–	1	–	0	6	–	2	–	0
Oklahoma A&M	2	–	1	–	0	4	–	4	–	0
Iowa State	3	–	2	–	0	4	–	3	–	1
Washington University	2	–	2	–	1	5	–	2	–	2
Kansas	3	–	3	–	1	3	–	4	–	1
Oklahoma	2	–	3	–	0	3	–	3	–	2
Kansas State	2	–	4	–	0	3	–	5	–	0
Drake	1	–	2	–	0	3	–	6	–	0
Grinnell	0	–	5	–	0	0	–	7	–	1
$ – Conference champion; Rankings from Dickinson System

The 1927 Missouri Tigers football team was an American football team that represented the University of Missouri as a member of the Missouri Valley Conference (MVC) during the 1927 college football season. The team compiled an overall record of 7–2 with a mark of 5–1 against conference opponents, won the MVC title, and outscored all opponents by a combined total of 129 to 90. Gwinn Henry was the head coach for the fifth of nine seasons. The team played its home games at Memorial Stadium in Columbia, Missouri.

== Schedule ==
Date	Opponent	Site	Result	Attendance	Source
October 1	Kansas State	Memorial Stadium; Columbia, MO	W 13–6		
October 8	Nebraska	Memorial Stadium; Columbia, MO (rivalry)	W 7–6		
October 15	at Washington University	Francis Field; St. Louis, MO	W 13–0		
October 22	at SMU*	Fair Park Stadium; Dallas, TX	L 9–32	12,000	
October 29	at Northwestern*	Dyche Stadium; Evanston, IL	W 34–19		
November 5	West Virginia*	Memorial Stadium; Columbia, MO	W 13–0		
November 11	at Iowa State	State Field; Ames, IA (rivalry)	W 13–6		
November 19	at Kansas	Memorial Stadium; Lawrence, KS (rivalry)	L 7–14		
November 24	Oklahoma^{†}	Memorial Stadium; Columbia, MO (rivalry)	W 20–7		
*Non-conference game; ^{†}Homecoming
