= Harold Iddings =

American football player and sports coach (1885–1952)

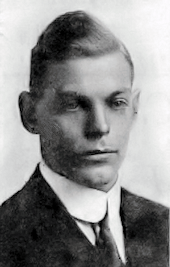
- Iddings at Miami

Biographical details
- Born: May 16, 1885; Merrillville, Indiana, U.S.
- Died: August 25, 1952 (aged 67); Chicago, Illinois, U.S.

Playing career

Football
- 1907–1908: Chicago
- 1915: Canton Bulldogs
- Position: Halfback

Coaching career (HC unless noted)

Football
- 1909–1910: Miami (OH)
- 1911–1913: Simpson (IA)
- 1916: Otterbein
- 1921: Penn (IA)
- 1929–1931: Thornton HS (IL)

Basketball
- 1910–1911: Kentucky
- 1911–1914: Simpson (IA)
- 1916–1917: Otterbein
- 1920–1921: Carnegie Tech
- 1921–1929: Thornton HS (IL)

Track
- 1915: Yankton

Head coaching record
- Overall: 16–26–1 (college football); 36–23 (college basketball); 7–5–2 (high school football); 59–39 (high school basketball)

Harold Jonathan Iddings (May 16, 1885 – August 25, 1952) was an American football player and coach of football, basketball and track and field. A 1909 graduate from the University of Chicago, he served as head football coach at Miami University from 1909 to 1910, at Simpson College from 1911 to 1913, at Otterbein College in 1916, and at Penn College—now known as William Penn University—in Oskaloosa, Iowa, in 1921, compiling a career college football record of 16–26–1. Iddings was also the head basketball coach at the University of Kentucky (1910–1911), Simpson (1911–1914), Otterbein (1916–1917), and the Carnegie Institute of Technology (1920–1921).

== College career ==
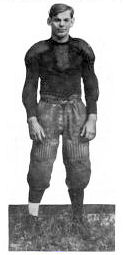
Iddings at University of Chicago

Iddings was an all-Big Ten Conference player at the University of Chicago in 1907 and 1908 under legendary coach Amos Alonzo Stagg. In both years he helped the Maroons to the Big Ten title. In the 1907 and 1908 seasons the Maroons won all nine Big Ten contests and finished with an overall record of 4–1 and 5–0–1, respectively. Iddings was also the co-Big Ten champion in the pole vault in 1907. Both Iddings and Barton Haggard of Drake University reached 11’–4”.

== Professional football ==
Iddings was a member of the Canton Bulldogs for part of the 1915 season. During this era of professional football, it was very common for players to be hired week to week. Teams did not establish rosters and added players depending on the opponent. Iddings was brought in to upgrade the left halfback position against the Detroit Heralds replacing M. J. Truesby. Late in the season, manager Jack Cusack made whole sale changes to the lineup including bringing in Jim Thorpe to take over the starting left halfback position.

== Later life ==
After leaving coaching at the college level, Iddings was the athletic director at Thornton Township High School in Harvey, Illinois. While at Thornton he coached both basketball and football during his tenure. He coached the basketball team from 1921 to 1929 with a 59–39 record including a district title in 1925–26 season. Iddings coached the football team from 1929 to 1931 with a record of 7–5–2. He retired from Thornton in 1946 spending the rest of his life on his farm in Westville, Indiana. He died on August 25, 1952, at St. Luke's Hospital in Chicago.

== Head coaching record ==
=== College football ===
Year	Team	Overall	Conference	Standing	Bowl/playoffs
Miami Redskins (Independent) (1909–1910)
1909	Miami	3–4			
1910	Miami	2–4–1			
Miami:		5–8–1			
Simpson Red and Gold (Independent) (1911–1913)
1911	Simpson	0–5			
1912	Simpson	1–2			
1913	Simpson	4–2			
Simpson:		5–9			
Otterbein Cardinals (Independent) (1916)
1916	Otterbein	5–3			
Otterbein:		5–3			
Penn (Iowa) Quakers (Independent) (1921)
1921	Penn	1–6			
Penn:		1–6			
Total:		16–26–1			

=== College basketball ===
Record table
Season	Team	Overall	Conference	Standing	Postseason
Kentucky Wildcats (Southern Intercollegiate Athletic Association) (1910–1911)
1910–11	Kentucky	5–6			
Kentucky:		5–6			
Simpson Redmen (Independent) (1912–1914)
1911–12	Simpson	10–5			
1912–13	Simpson	10–1			
1913–14	Simpson	8–3			
Simpson:		28–9			
Otterbein Cardinals (Independent) (1916–1917)
1916–17	Otterbein	3–8			
Otterbein:		3–8			
Total:		36–23			
