= 1927 Kansas State Wildcats football team =

American college football season

1927 Kansas State Wildcats football
- Conference: Missouri Valley Conference
- Record: 3–5 (2–4 MVC)
- Head coach: Charlie Bachman (8th season)
- Offensive scheme: Notre Dame Box
- Home stadium: Memorial Stadium

1927 Missouri Valley Conference football standings
| | Conf. | | | | | Overall |
| Team | W | | L | | T | W | | L | | T |
|---|---|---|---|---|---|---|---|---|---|---|
| Missouri $ | 5 | – | 1 | – | 0 | 7 | – | 2 | – | 0 |
| No. 9 Nebraska | 4 | – | 1 | – | 0 | 6 | – | 2 | – | 0 |
| Oklahoma A&M | 2 | – | 1 | – | 0 | 4 | – | 4 | – | 0 |
| Iowa State | 3 | – | 2 | – | 0 | 4 | – | 3 | – | 1 |
| Washington University | 2 | – | 2 | – | 1 | 5 | – | 2 | – | 2 |
| Kansas | 3 | – | 3 | – | 1 | 3 | – | 4 | – | 1 |
| Oklahoma | 2 | – | 3 | – | 0 | 3 | – | 3 | – | 2 |
| Kansas State | 2 | – | 4 | – | 0 | 3 | – | 5 | – | 0 |
| Drake | 1 | – | 2 | – | 0 | 3 | – | 6 | – | 0 |
| Grinnell | 0 | – | 5 | – | 0 | 0 | – | 7 | – | 1 |
$ – Conference champion; Rankings from Dickinson System

The 1927 Kansas State Agricultural College Wildcats football team represented Kansas State Agricultural College in the 1927 college football season.

== Schedule ==
| Date | Opponent | Site | Result | Source |
|---|---|---|---|---|
| September 24 | Hays Teachers* | Memorial Stadium; Manhattan, KS | W 30–6 | |
| October 1 | at Missouri | Memorial Stadium; Columbia, MO | L 6–13 | |
| October 15 | at Kansas | Memorial Stadium; Lawrence, KS (rivalry) | W 13–2 | |
| October 22 | Oklahoma | Memorial Stadium; Manhattan, KS | W 20–14 | |
| October 29 | at Iowa State | State Field; Ames, IA (rivalry) | L 7–12 | |
| November 11 | at Texas* | War Memorial Stadium; Austin, TX | L 7–41 | |
| November 19 | Nebraska^{†} | Memorial Stadium; Manhattan, KS (rivalry) | L 0–33 | |
| November 24 | Oklahoma A&M | Memorial Stadium; Manhattan, KS | L 18–25 | |
*Non-conference game; ^{†}Homecoming
