= 1927 TCU Horned Frogs football team =

American college football season

1927 TCU Horned Frogs football
- Conference: Southwest Conference
- Record: 4–3–2 (1–2–2 SWC)
- Head coach: Matty Bell (5th season)
- Home stadium: Clark Field

1927 Southwest Conference football standings
	Conf.					Overall
Team	W		L		T	W		L		T
No. 11 Texas A&M $	4	–	0	–	1	8	–	0	–	1
SMU	4	–	1	–	0	7	–	2	–	0
Arkansas	2	–	1	–	0	8	–	1	–	0
Texas	2	–	2	–	1	6	–	2	–	1
TCU	1	–	2	–	2	4	–	3	–	2
Rice	1	–	3	–	0	2	–	6	–	1
Baylor	0	–	5	–	0	2	–	7	–	0
$ – Conference champion; Rankings from Dickinson System

The 1927 TCU Horned Frogs football team represented Texas Christian University (TCU) as a member the Southwest Conference (SWC) during the 1927 college football season. Led by fifth-year head coach Matty Bell, the Horned Frogs compiled and overall record of 4–3–2 overall with a mark of 1–2–2 in conference play, placing fifth. TCU played their home games at Clark Field, located on campus in Fort Worth, Texas.

== Schedule ==
Date	Opponent	Site	Result	Attendance	Source
September 24	Daniel Baker*	Clark Field; Fort Worth, TX	W 27–0	5,000	
October 1	at Texas	War Memorial Stadium; Austin, TX (rivalry)	T 0–0	5,000	
October 8	Texas Tech*	Clark Field; Fort Worth, TX (rivalry)	W 16–6	4,000	
October 15	Austin*	Clark Field; Fort Worth, TX	W 20–13	3,000	
October 22	at Texas A&M	Clark Field; Fort Worth, TX (rivalry)	T 0–0	13,000	
October 29	at Baylor	Cotton Palace; Waco, TX (rivalry)	W 14–0	8,000	
November 5	Arkansas	Clark Field; Fort Worth, TX	L 3–10		
November 11	at Centenary*	Centenary College Stadium; Shreveport, LA	L 3–7		
November 24	SMU	Clark Field; Fort Worth, TX (rivalry)	L 6–28	15,000	
*Non-conference game
