= 1927 Nebraska Cornhuskers football team =

American college football season

1927 Nebraska Cornhuskers football
- Conference: Missouri Valley Conference
- Record: 6–2 (4–1 MVC)
- Head coach: Ernest Bearg (3rd season)
- Home stadium: Memorial Stadium

1927 Missouri Valley Conference football standings
	Conf.					Overall
Team	W		L		T	W		L		T
Missouri $	5	–	1	–	0	7	–	2	–	0
No. 9 Nebraska	4	–	1	–	0	6	–	2	–	0
Oklahoma A&M	2	–	1	–	0	4	–	4	–	0
Iowa State	3	–	2	–	0	4	–	3	–	1
Washington University	2	–	2	–	1	5	–	2	–	2
Kansas	3	–	3	–	1	3	–	4	–	1
Oklahoma	2	–	3	–	0	3	–	3	–	2
Kansas State	2	–	4	–	0	3	–	5	–	0
Drake	1	–	2	–	0	3	–	6	–	0
Grinnell	0	–	5	–	0	0	–	7	–	1
$ – Conference champion; Rankings from Dickinson System

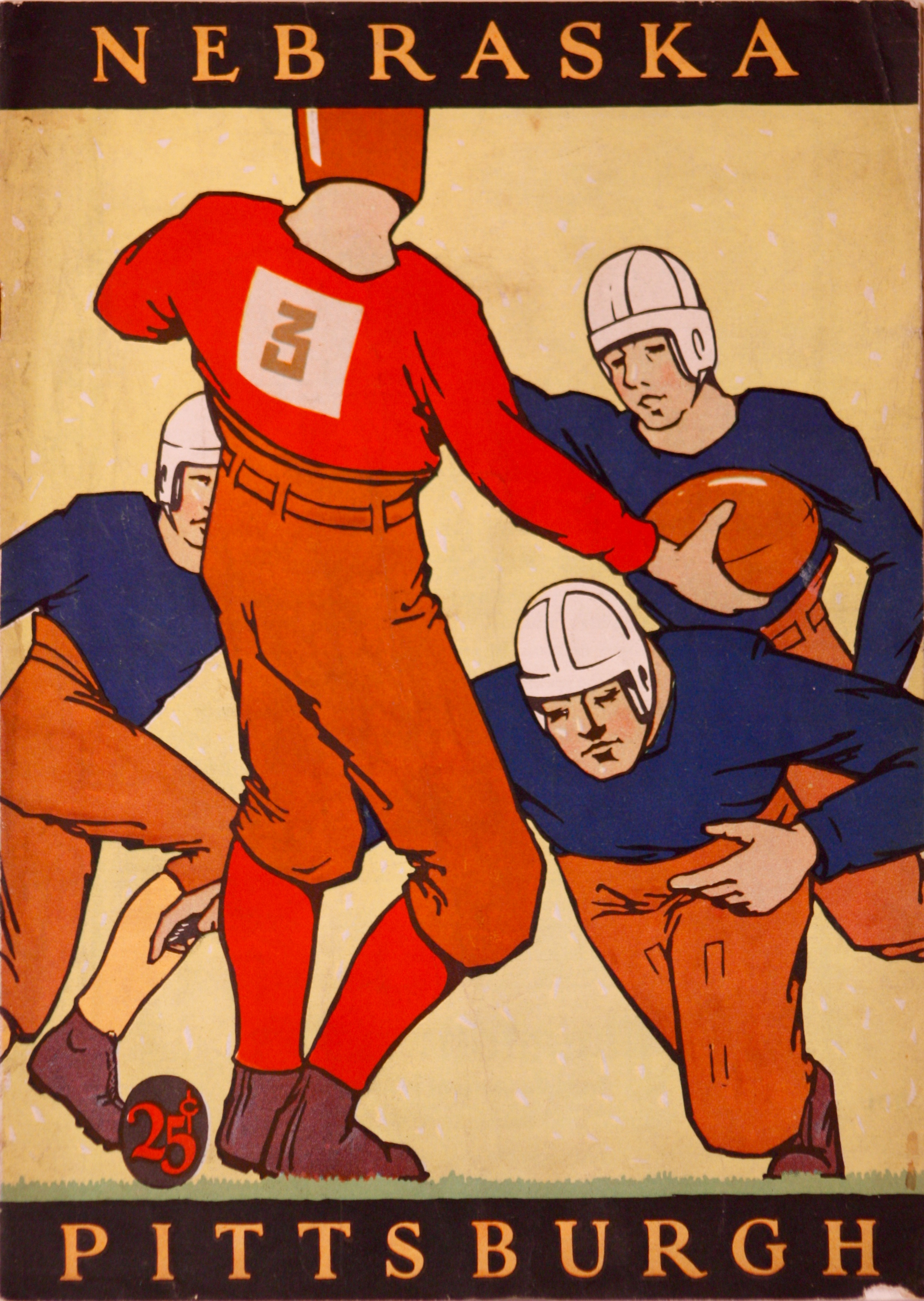
1927 Pitt versus Nebraska Official Souvenir Football Program

The 1927 Nebraska Cornhuskers football team was an American football team that represented the University of Nebraska in the Missouri Valley Conference (MVC) during the 1927 college football season. In its third season under head coach Ernest Bearg, the team compiled a 6–2 record (4–1 against conference opponents), finished second in the MVC, and outscored opponents by a total of 211 to 59. The team was ranked No. 9 in the nation in the Dickinson System ratings released in December 1927. The team played its home games at Memorial Stadium in Lincoln, Nebraska.

== Before the season ==
Coach Bearg's third season began with a reduction from the record 60 players on the Cornhusker squad in 1926, heading into the 1927 season with 45 on the roster. Nebraska had not performed well in Bearg's first season, finishing well down in the conference standings, but had improved to 2nd place in 1926. 1927 seemed as likely as any for Bearg to attain his first conference title.

== Schedule ==
Date	Time	Opponent	Site	Result	Attendance	Source
October 1	2:00 p.m.	Iowa State	Memorial Stadium; Lincoln, NE (rivalry)	W 6–0	10,000	
October 8	2:30 p.m.	at Missouri	Memorial Stadium; Columbia, MO (rivalry)	L 6–7		
October 15	2:00 p.m.	Grinnell	Memorial Stadium; Lincoln, NE	W 58–0		
October 29	2:00 p.m.	Syracuse*	Memorial Stadium; Lincoln, NE	W 21–0	27,000	
November 5	2:00 p.m.	Kansas^{†}	Memorial Stadium; Lincoln, NE (rivalry)	W 47–13		
November 12	1:00 p.m.	at Pittsburgh*	Pitt Stadium; Pittsburgh, PA	L 13–21	30,000–35,000	
November 19	2:00 p.m.	at Kansas State	Memorial Stadium; Manhattan, KS (rivalry)	W 33–0		
November 24	2:00 p.m.	NYU*	Memorial Stadium; Lincoln, NE	W 27–18	35,000	
*Non-conference game; ^{†}Homecoming; All times are in Central time

== Roster ==
Ashburn, Clifford (Unk) E Asmus, Charles (So.) C Beck, Victor (Jr.) FB; Bronson, Willard (Unk) QB; Brown, John (Sr.) QB; Bushee, Charles (So.) G Drath, Walter (Jr.) G Elkins, Fait (So.) QB; Farley, George (So.) HB; Grow, Lloyd (Sr.) C Holm, Elmer (Jr.) G Holt, George (So.) C Howell, Edward (Jr.) HB; Hurd, Clinton (So.) G James, Theodore (Unk) C Jeffries, Ralph (So.) E Krall, Bob (Jr.) E Lawson, Vinton (Sr.) E Lee, Evard (Sr.) E Lewandowski, Adolph (So.) E Lindell, Don (Jr.) QB; Lucas, Leroy (Jr.) T McBride, Clark (So.) HB	McMullen, Dan (Jr.) G Munn, Glenn (So.) T Oehlrich, Arnold (Sr.) FB; Peaker, Harold (Jr.) QB; Presnell, Glenn (Sr.) HB; Raish, Clarence (Sr.) G Randels, Ray (Sr.) T Ray, George (So.) T Reeves, Joe (Jr.) C Richards, Raymond (So.) T Schulz, William (Jr.) G Shaner, George (Sr.) E Simic, Adolph (Jr.) E Sloan, Clair (So.) HB; Sprague, Leon (Sr.) E Still, Joe (Jr.) G Toms, Howard (So.) E Voris, Earl (Jr.) HB; White, Lloyd (So.) G Whitmore, Robert (Sr.) G Witte, Willard (So.) HB; Zuver, Merle (Jr.) C

== Coaching staff ==
Coach	Position	First year	Alma mater
Ernest Bearg	Head coach	1925	Washburn
Leo Sherer	Ends coach	1923	Nebraska
Charlie T. Black	Backfield coach	1926	Kansas
Bunny Oakes	Line coach	1926	Illinois

== Game summaries ==
=== Iowa State ===
Iowa State at Nebraska

Team	1	2	Total
Iowa State			0
• Nebraska			6

- Date: October 1
- Location: Memorial Stadium • Lincoln, Nebraska
- Game attendance: 10,000

Iowa State was first up for the 1927 slate, and coach Bearg made an effort to get all of the new Cornhusker players in the game. Nebraska only scored six in the contest, but still secured the shutout victory to open conference play and advance farther ahead in the series to 17–4–1.

=== Missouri ===
Nebraska at Missouri

Team	1	2	Total
Nebraska			6
• Missouri			7

- Date: October 8
- Location: Faurot Field • Columbia, Missouri

Although Nebraska racked up impressive statistics and seemed at times to move the ball with ease, time and time again the Missouri squad held back the Cornhuskers. Nebraska HB Presnell rolled up more yards on the day then the entire Missouri team combined, but it was the Tigers that emerged the winner by one point, marking their third straight victory over the Cornhuskers. Those three straight wins accounted for half of all of Missouri's wins against Nebraska since the beginning of the series in 1892, and they gained slightly on the series by pulling up to 6–14–1.

=== Grinnell ===
Grinnell at Nebraska

Team	1	2	Total
Grinnell			0
• Nebraska			58

- Date: October 15
- Location: Memorial Stadium • Lincoln, Nebraska

Nebraska responded severely to the continued frustration dealt to them by Missouri the previous week by absolutely smashing Grinnell in Lincoln with a shutout 58–0 performance, which was the most points they had scored against an opponent since the 66–0 downing of South Dakota in 1922. Grinnell and Nebraska had shared conference affiliations since 1919, but this was the first time the teams had met on the field since 1908. It was also the last meeting of the teams, ending one of the oldest series in the Nebraska program's history dating back to 1894, with Nebraska in command at 7–2.

=== Syracuse ===
Syracuse at Nebraska

Team	1	2	Total
Syracuse			0
• Nebraska			21

- Date: October 29
- Location: Memorial Stadium • Lincoln, Nebraska

Three years had passed since the Cornhuskers had last taken a shot at the Orangemen, and Nebraska was aiming to cut the 2-game series lead held by Syracuse. The success of the previous game was extended as the Cornhuskers played an additional four quarters of football without being scored upon, sending the eastern team home as recipients of a 0–21 blanking in Lincoln. The win brought Nebraska up to within one game of tying the series, to 2–3 all-time against Syracuse.

=== Kansas ===
Kansas at Nebraska

Team	1	2	Total
Kansas			13
• Nebraska			47

- Date: November 5
- Location: Memorial Stadium • Lincoln, Nebraska

The Cornhuskers were on a roll, after recording two consecutive shutouts since the bitter loss to Missouri, and ran over Kansas with minimal effort. Though the shutout streak was broken, the margin of victory was indicative of the offensive production put forth by the Nebraska team. Even with the 1-point loss to the Tigers in the second game, the Cornhuskers had outscored their opponents 138–20 during the season so far. Nebraska improved their series lead with Kansas to 23–9–2.

=== Pittsburgh ===
Nebraska at Pittsburgh

Team	1	2	Total
Nebraska			13
• Pittsburgh			21

- Date: November 12
- Location: Pitt Stadium • Pittsburgh, Pennsylvania

The Cornhuskers journeyed to Pittsburgh to face the Panthers for only the second time ever, the previous meeting a Pitt victory in 1921. Undefeated Pittsburgh scored first, but was soon matched by an answering score from Nebraska. The match was a close contest which remained in doubt until late in the game, but ultimately Nebraska returned to Lincoln winless against Pitt all-time despite the honorable effort.

=== Kansas State ===
Nebraska at Kansas State

Team	1	2	Total
• Nebraska			33
Kansas State			0

- Date: November 19
- Location: Memorial Stadium • Manhattan, Kansas

The Kansas State Aggies had played Nebraska close in the previous two seasons, pulling down a tie and a three-point loss for their efforts, and today seemed like it might be another fight as halftime arrived and Nebraska was ahead with a weak 6–0 edge. The second half was a different story, however, as Nebraska piled on the points and kept the Aggies scoreless for the duration of the game. Kansas State sent the Cornhuskers home, but were left harboring a bitter, winless 0–11–1 record against Nebraska to date.

=== New York University ===
New York University at Nebraska

Team	1	2	Total
New York University			18
• Nebraska			27

- Date: November 24
- Location: Memorial Stadium • Lincoln, Nebraska
- Game attendance: 35,000

For the second time of the season, Nebraska met an undefeated eastern team when NYU arrived in Lincoln. Although the Cornhuskers scored first and held a respectable 19–6 lead by the half, the Violets stormed back to pull within one point after the half. Nebraska then buckled down as the stands came to life with spectators on their feet, as the Cornhuskers rolled off an additional eight unanswered points and defeated the visiting NYU squad in glorious fashion to end the season with victory. This was the second and last game between NYU and Nebraska, with both contests recorded as Cornhusker victories

== After the season ==
Coach Bearg's third season was another moderate success, although the conference title once again eluded him, as his career record improved to 16–6–2 (.708). The program's overall record edged up slightly to 213–73–19 (.730), but Nebraska's conference record slipped a touch down to 49–8–5 (.831). Despite the two losses that marred the undefeated season, Nebraska's strength of schedule resulted in a final #9 national ranking under the Dickinson System.

The Missouri Valley Intercollegiate Athletic Association was fractured following the 1927 season, as Drake, Grinnell, Oklahoma A&M, and Washington (MO) departed the MVIAA to form the Missouri Valley Conference. The larger remaining schools, Iowa State, Kansas, Kansas State, Missouri, Nebraska, and Oklahoma remained in the MVIAA and became informally known as the Big Six.
