= Archie Kirk =

American football player and coach

Biographical details
- Born: July 9, 1890
- Education: Iowa (1915)

Playing career
- 1912–1914: Iowa
- Position: Tackle

Coaching career (HC unless noted)
- 1915: Simpson (IA)

Head coaching record
- Overall: 2–6

Accomplishments and honors

Awards
- All-Western (1913)

Archie Raymond "Bunt" Kirk (born July 9, 1890) was an American football player and coach. He served as the head football coach at Simpson College in Indianola, Iowa in 1915, compiling a record of 2–6. Kirk was a 1915 graduate of the University of Iowa, where played college football as a tackle and was a member of the Sigma Alpha Epsilon fraternity.

== Head coaching record ==
Year	Team	Overall	Conference	Standing	Bowl/playoffs
Simpson Red and Gold (Independent) (1915)
1915	Simpson	2–6			
Simpson:		2–6			
Total:		2–6			
