= Jim Glogowski =

American football coach (born c. 1973)

Current position
- Title: Head coach
- Team: Sioux Falls
- Conference: NSIC
- Record: 24–19

Biographical details
- Born: c. 1973 (age 52–53)
- Education: University of South Dakota (1996)

Playing career
- 1992–1995: South Dakota
- Positions: Strong safety, outside linebacker

Coaching career (HC unless noted)
- 1996: South Dakota (SA)
- 1997–1998: Augustana (SD) (GA)
- 1999–2000: Allegheny (ST/LB)
- 2001: Clarion (ST/LB)
- 2002–2003: Allegheny (DC)
- 2004–2005: South Dakota (assistant)
- 2006–2007: South Dakota (DC)
- 2008–2015: Simpson (IA)
- 2016–2022: Minnesota State (DC)
- 2023–present: Sioux Falls

Head coaching record
- Overall: 61–62

Accomplishments and honors

Awards
- First Team All-NCC (1995); Coyote Hall of Fame (2013)

Jim Glogowski (born c. 1973) is an American college football coach. He is the head football coach for the University of Sioux Falls, a position he has held since 2023. He also was the head coach for the Simpson Storm football team from 2008 to 2015. He also coached for South Dakota, Augustana (SD), Allegheny, Clarion, and Minnesota State. He played college football for South Dakota as a strong safety and outside linebacker.

== Head coaching record ==
Year	Team	Overall	Conference	Standing	Bowl/playoffs
Simpson Storm (Iowa Intercollegiate Athletic Conference) (2008–2015)
2008	Simpson	7–3	5–3	T–3rd	
2009	Simpson	3–7	2–6	T–7th	
2010	Simpson	2–8	2–6	T–7th	
2011	Simpson	5–5	5–3	5th	
2012	Simpson	6–4	4–3	T–2nd	
2013	Simpson	7–3	5–2	2nd	
2014	Simpson	3–7	0–7	8th	
2015	Simpson	4–6	3–4	T–4th	
Simpson:		37–43	26–34		
Sioux Falls Cougars (Northern Sun Intercollegiate Conference) (2023–present)
2023	Sioux Falls	3–8	3–7	9th	
2024	Sioux Falls	8–3	7–3	T–2nd	
2025	Sioux Falls	7–4	6–4 / 3–3	T–6th / T–4th (South)	
2026	Sioux Falls	6–4	6–3 / 2–3		
Sioux Falls:		24–19	22–17		
Total:		61–62			
