= 1927 Iowa State Cyclones football team =

American college football season

1927 Iowa State Cyclones football
- Conference: Missouri Valley Conference
- Record: 4–3–1 (3–2 MVC)
- Head coach: C. Noel Workman (2nd season)
- Captain: Walter Weiss
- Home stadium: State Field

1927 Missouri Valley Conference football standings
	Conf.					Overall
Team	W		L		T	W		L		T
Missouri $	5	–	1	–	0	7	–	2	–	0
No. 9 Nebraska	4	–	1	–	0	6	–	2	–	0
Oklahoma A&M	2	–	1	–	0	4	–	4	–	0
Iowa State	3	–	2	–	0	4	–	3	–	1
Washington University	2	–	2	–	1	5	–	2	–	2
Kansas	3	–	3	–	1	3	–	4	–	1
Oklahoma	2	–	3	–	0	3	–	3	–	2
Kansas State	2	–	4	–	0	3	–	5	–	0
Drake	1	–	2	–	0	3	–	6	–	0
Grinnell	0	–	5	–	0	0	–	7	–	1
$ – Conference champion; Rankings from Dickinson System

The 1927 Iowa State Cyclones football team represented Iowa State College of Agricultural and Mechanic Arts (later renamed Iowa State University) in the Missouri Valley Conference during the 1927 college football season. In their second season under head coach C. Noel Workman, the Cyclones compiled a 4–3–1 record (3–2 against conference opponents), finished in fourth place in the conference, and were outscored by opponents by a combined total of 78 to 77. They played their home games at State Field in Ames, Iowa.

Walter Weiss was the team captain. Harry Lindblom was selected as a first-team all-conference player. The Cyclones garnered a 12-12 tie against 1927 national co-champion Illinois.

== Schedule ==
Date	Time	Opponent	Site	Result	Attendance	Source
October 1	2:00 pm	at Nebraska	Memorial Stadium; Lincoln, NE (rivalry)	L 0–6	10,000	
October 8	2:30 pm	Simpson*	State Field; Ames, IA	W 26–6		
October 15	2:30 pm	at Illinois*	Memorial Stadium; Champaign, IL	T 12–12	12,000	
October 29	2:00 pm	Kansas State^{†}	State Field; Ames, IA (rivalry)	W 12–7		
November 5	2:00 pm	at Drake	Drake Stadium; Des Moines, IA	W 7–0		
November 11	2:00 pm	Missouri	State Field; Ames, IA (rivalry)	L 6–13		
November 19	2:00 pm	Grinnell	State Field; Ames, IA	W 14–0		
November 24	2:00 pm	at Marquette*	Marquette Stadium; Milwaukee, WI	L 0–34	15,000	
*Non-conference game; ^{†}Homecoming; All times are in Central time
