= 1927 Washington University Bears football team =

American college football season

1927 Washington University Bears football
- Conference: Missouri Valley Conference
- Record: 5–2–2 (2–2–1 MVC)
- Head coach: Bob Higgins (3rd season)
- Home stadium: Francis Field

1927 Missouri Valley Conference football standings
| | Conf. | | | | | Overall |
| Team | W | | L | | T | W | | L | | T |
|---|---|---|---|---|---|---|---|---|---|---|
| Missouri $ | 5 | – | 1 | – | 0 | 7 | – | 2 | – | 0 |
| No. 9 Nebraska | 4 | – | 1 | – | 0 | 6 | – | 2 | – | 0 |
| Oklahoma A&M | 2 | – | 1 | – | 0 | 4 | – | 4 | – | 0 |
| Iowa State | 3 | – | 2 | – | 0 | 4 | – | 3 | – | 1 |
| Washington University | 2 | – | 2 | – | 1 | 5 | – | 2 | – | 2 |
| Kansas | 3 | – | 3 | – | 1 | 3 | – | 4 | – | 1 |
| Oklahoma | 2 | – | 3 | – | 0 | 3 | – | 3 | – | 2 |
| Kansas State | 2 | – | 4 | – | 0 | 3 | – | 5 | – | 0 |
| Drake | 1 | – | 2 | – | 0 | 3 | – | 6 | – | 0 |
| Grinnell | 0 | – | 5 | – | 0 | 0 | – | 7 | – | 1 |
$ – Conference champion; Rankings from Dickinson System

The 1927 Washington University Bears football team represented Washington University in St. Louis as a member of the Missouri Valley Conference (MVC) during the 1927 college football season. In its third and final season under head coach Bob Higgins, the team compiled a 5–2–2 record and outscored opponents by a total of 98 to 70. The team played home games at Francis Field in St. Louis.

== Schedule ==
| Date | Time | Opponent | Site | Result | Attendance | Source |
|---|---|---|---|---|---|---|
| September 24 | | Lombard* | Francis Field; St. Louis, MO | W 6–0 | | |
| October 1 | | Oklahoma A&M | Francis Field; St. Louis, MO | W 6–0 | | |
| October 8 | 2:30 p.m. | Missouri Mines* | Francis Field; St. Louis, MO | W 13–0 | | |
| October 15 | | Missouri | Francis Field; St. Louis, MO | L 0–13 | | |
| October 22 | | at Kansas | Memorial Stadium; Lawrence, KS | T 21–21 | | |
| October 29 | | Westminster (MO)* | Francis Field; St. Louis, MO | T 6–6 | | |
| November 5 | | at Oklahoma | Memorial Stadium; Norman, OK | L 7–23 | | |
| November 12 | | Grinnell^{†} | Francis Field; St. Louis, MO | W 18–7 | 3,500 | |
| November 24 | 2:00 p.m. | at Saint Louis* | Sportsman's Park; St. Louis, MO | W 21–0 | 18,739 | |
*Non-conference game; ^{†}Homecoming; All times are in Central time
