= 1927 Baylor Bears football team =

American college football season

1927 Baylor Bears football
- Conference: Southwest Conference
- Record: 2–7 (0–5 SWC)
- Head coach: Morley Jennings (2nd season)
- Captain: Wesley F. Weed
- Home stadium: Carroll Field; Cotton Palace

1927 Southwest Conference football standings
	Conf.					Overall
Team	W		L		T	W		L		T
No. 11 Texas A&M $	4	–	0	–	1	8	–	0	–	1
SMU	4	–	1	–	0	7	–	2	–	0
Arkansas	2	–	1	–	0	8	–	1	–	0
Texas	2	–	2	–	1	6	–	2	–	1
TCU	1	–	2	–	2	4	–	3	–	2
Rice	1	–	3	–	0	2	–	6	–	1
Baylor	0	–	5	–	0	2	–	7	–	0
$ – Conference champion; Rankings from Dickinson System

The 1927 Baylor Bears football team represented Baylor University in the Southwest Conference (SWC) during the 1927 college football season. In their second season under head coach Morley Jennings, the Bears compiled a 2–7 record (0–5 against conference opponents), finished in last place in the conference, and were outscored by opponents by a combined total of 139 to 74. They played their home games at Carroll Field and the Cotton Palace in Waco, Texas. Wesley F. Weed was the team captain.

== Schedule ==
Date	Opponent	Site	Result	Source
September 24	Southwestern (TX)*	Carroll Field; Waco, TX	L 6–19	
September 30	at Trinity (TX)*	Yoakum Field; Waxahachie, TX	W 20–12	
October 8	at Arkansas	The Hill; Fayetteville, AR	L 6–13	
October 15	St. Edward's*	Carroll Field; Waco, TX	W 12–6	
October 22	Centenary*	Cotton Palace; Waco, TX	L 6–9	
October 29	TCU^{†}	Cotton Palace; Waco, TX (rivalry)	L 0–14	
November 5	at Texas	War Memorial Stadium; Austin, TX (rivalry)	L 12–13	
November 12	at SMU	Ownby Stadium; University Park, TX	L 0–34	
November 24	at Rice	Rice Field; Houston, TX	L 12–19	
*Non-conference game; ^{†}Homecoming
