= 1927 Arkansas Razorbacks football team =

American college football season

1927 Arkansas Razorbacks football
- Conference: Southwest Conference
- Record: 8–1 (2–1 SWC)
- Head coach: Francis Schmidt (6th season)
- Captain: Eusell Coleman
- Home stadium: The Hill

1927 Southwest Conference football standings
	Conf.					Overall
Team	W		L		T	W		L		T
No. 11 Texas A&M $	4	–	0	–	1	8	–	0	–	1
SMU	4	–	1	–	0	7	–	2	–	0
Arkansas	2	–	1	–	0	8	–	1	–	0
Texas	2	–	2	–	1	6	–	2	–	1
TCU	1	–	2	–	2	4	–	3	–	2
Rice	1	–	3	–	0	2	–	6	–	1
Baylor	0	–	5	–	0	2	–	7	–	0
$ – Conference champion; Rankings from Dickinson System

The 1927 Arkansas Razorbacks football team represented the University of Arkansas in the Southwest Conference (SWC) during the 1927 college football season. In their sixth year under head coach Francis Schmidt, the Razorbacks compiled an 8–1 record (2–1 against SWC opponents), finished in third place in the SWC, and outscored all opponents by a combined total of 218 to 76. The team's only loss came against Texas A&M by a 40–6 score.

== Schedule ==
Date	Opponent	Site	Result	Attendance	Source
October 1	Ozarks*	The Hill; Fayetteville, AR	W 32–0		
October 8	Baylor	The Hill; Fayetteville, AR	W 13–6		
October 15	at Texas A&M	Kyle Field; College Station, TX (rivalry)	L 6–40		
October 22	Missouri Mines*	The Hill; Fayetteville, AR	W 34–0		
October 29	vs. LSU*	State Fair Stadium; Shreveport, LA (rivalry)	W 28–0	12,000	
November 5	at TCU	Clark Field; Fort Worth, TX	W 10–3		
November 12	Oklahoma A&M*^{†}	The Hill; Fayetteville, AR	W 33–20		
November 19	Austin*	The Hill; Fayetteville, AR	W 42–0		
November 26	Hendrix*	Kavanaugh Field; Little Rock, AR	W 20–7		
*Non-conference game; ^{†}Homecoming
