= 1927 Texas Longhorns football team =

American college football season

1927 Texas Longhorns football
- Conference: Southwest Conference
- Record: 6–2–1 (2–2–1 SWC)
- Head coach: Clyde Littlefield (1st season)
- Captain: Ox Higgins
- Home stadium: War Memorial Stadium

1927 Southwest Conference football standings
	Conf.					Overall
Team	W		L		T	W		L		T
No. 11 Texas A&M $	4	–	0	–	1	8	–	0	–	1
SMU	4	–	1	–	0	7	–	2	–	0
Arkansas	2	–	1	–	0	8	–	1	–	0
Texas	2	–	2	–	1	6	–	2	–	1
TCU	1	–	2	–	2	4	–	3	–	2
Rice	1	–	3	–	0	2	–	6	–	1
Baylor	0	–	5	–	0	2	–	7	–	0
$ – Conference champion; Rankings from Dickinson System

The 1927 Texas Longhorns football team was an American football team that represented the University of Texas (now known as the University of Texas at Austin) as a member of the Southwest Conference (SWC) during the 1927 college football season. In their first year under head coach Clyde Littlefield, the Longhorns compiled an overall record of 6–2–1, with a mark of 2–2–1 in conference play, and finished fourth in the SWC.

== Schedule ==
Date	Opponent	Site	Result	Attendance	Source
September 24	Southwestern State (OK)*	War Memorial Stadium; Austin, TX	W 43–0		
October 1	TCU	War Memorial Stadium; Austin, TX (rivalry)	T 0–0	5,000	
October 8	Trinity (TX)*	War Memorial Stadium; Austin, TX	W 20–6		
October 15	vs. Vanderbilt*	Fair Park Stadium; Dallas, TX	W 13–6	18,000	
October 22	Rice	War Memorial Stadium; Austin, TX (rivalry)	W 27–0		
October 29	at SMU	Ownby Stadium; University Park, TX	L 0–14	22,000	
November 5	Baylor	War Memorial Stadium; Austin, TX (rivalry)	W 13–12		
November 11	Kansas State*	War Memorial Stadium; Austin, TX	W 41–7		
November 24	at Texas A&M	Kyle Field; College Station, TX (rivalry)	L 7–28	27,000	
*Non-conference game
