= 1927 SMU Mustangs football team =

American college football season

1927 SMU Mustangs football
- Conference: Southwest Conference
- Record: 7–2 (4–1 SWC)
- Head coach: Ray Morrison (8th season)
- Captains: Gerald Mann; Robert E. Tatum
- Home stadium: Ownby Stadium, Fair Park Stadium

1927 Southwest Conference football standings
	Conf.					Overall
Team	W		L		T	W		L		T
No. 11 Texas A&M $	4	–	0	–	1	8	–	0	–	1
SMU	4	–	1	–	0	7	–	2	–	0
Arkansas	2	–	1	–	0	8	–	1	–	0
Texas	2	–	2	–	1	6	–	2	–	1
TCU	1	–	2	–	2	4	–	3	–	2
Rice	1	–	3	–	0	2	–	6	–	1
Baylor	0	–	5	–	0	2	–	7	–	0
$ – Conference champion; Rankings from Dickinson System

The 1927 SMU Mustangs football team was an American football team that represented the Southern Methodist University (SMU) as a member of the Southwest Conference (SWC) during the 1927 college football season. In its eighth season, under head coach Ray Morrison, the team compiled a 7–2 record and outscored opponents by a total of 267 to 81.

== Schedule ==
Date	Opponent	Site	Result	Attendance	Source
September 24	North Texas State Teachers*	Ownby Stadium; University Park, TX (rivalry)	W 68–0		
October 1	Howard Payne*	Ownby Stadium; University Park, TX	W 32–0		
October 8	at Centenary*	Centenary College Stadium; Shreveport, LA	L 12–21		
October 14	Rice	Ownby Stadium; University Park, TX (rivalry)	W 34–6		
October 22	Missouri*	Fair Park Stadium; Dallas, TX	W 32–9	12,000	
October 29	Texas	Ownby Stadium; University Park, TX	W 14–0		
November 5	at Texas A&M	Kyle Field; College Station, TX	L 13–39		
November 12	Baylor	Ownby Stadium; University Park, TX	W 34–0		
November 24	at TCU	Clark Field; Fort Worth, TX (rivalry)	W 28–6	15,000	
*Non-conference game
