= Ernest Bearg =

American football and basketball coach (1893–1971)

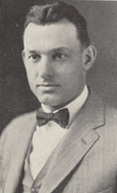
- Bearg from 1927 Cornhusker

Biographical details
- Born: July 20, 1893; Moray, Kansas, U.S.
- Died: August 24, 1971 (aged 78); Minneapolis, Minnesota, U.S.

Coaching career (HC unless noted)

Football
- 1918–1919: Washburn
- ?: Illinois (assistant)
- 1925–1928: Nebraska
- 1929–1935: Washburn

Basketball
- 1925–1926: Nebraska

Administrative career (AD unless noted)
- 1919–1921: Washburn
- 1929–1936: Washburn

Head coaching record
- Overall: 70–41–7 (football); 8–10 (basketball)

Accomplishments and honors

Championships
- Football; 1 Big Six (1928); 2 CIC (1930–1931)

Ernest Elmer Bearg (July 20, 1893 – August 24, 1971) was an American football and basketball coach. He served as the head football coach at Washburn University from 1918 to 1919 and again from 1929 to 1935 and the University of Nebraska–Lincoln from 1925 to 1928, compiling a career college football record of 71–40–7. Bearg also spent one year as Nebraska's men's basketball coach (1925–1926) and posted an 8–10 mark. Before coming to Nebraska, he also served as an assistant coach at the University of Illinois at Urbana–Champaign under Robert Zuppke

== Early life ==
Bearg was a 1916 graduate of Washburn University, where he was a member of the Kansas Beta chapter of Phi Delta Theta. During his senior year at Washburn, he was elected senior class president.

== Coaching career ==
=== Washburn ===
Bearg was the 15th and then the 20th head football coach for the Washburn Ichabods. He first held the position for two seasons in 1918 and 1919 and again for seven more seasons from 1929 until 1935. Bearg's overall record at Washburn was 47–33–4.

After coaching for four seasons at Nebraska, Bearg led the Ichabods to a 36–31 record and the 1931 Central Intercollegiate Conference championship. Two of his team's three losses during the 1931 season came to the Kansas and Kansas State.

=== Nebraska ===
Under Bearg's leadership, Nebraska won its first Big Six Conference title in 1928 when his team went 7–1–1. The Cornhuskers were conference runners-up in 1926 and 1927 According to Nebraska's official athletics website, Bearg fielded powerful team during his four years at the helm but "fans criticized him for not using strategy and deception, which eventually led to his resignation." After four seasons in Lincoln, Bearg was replaced by future College Football Hall of Fame coach, Dana X. Bible.

== Honors ==
Bearg was inducted into the Washburn Athletics Hall of Fame in 1973–74, and earned a spot as a coach in the Nebraska Football Hall of Fame in 1988.

== Head coaching record ==
=== Football ===
Year	Team	Overall	Conference	Standing	Bowl/playoffs
Washburn Ichabods (Kansas Collegiate Athletic Conference) (1918–1919)
1918	Washburn	4–1			
1919	Washburn	7–1–1	7–1	3rd	
Nebraska Cornhuskers (Missouri Valley Intercollegiate Athletic Association/Big Six Conference) (1925–1928)
1925	Nebraska	4–2–2	2–2–1	5th	
1926	Nebraska	6–2	5–1	2nd	
1927	Nebraska	6–2	4–1	2nd	
1928	Nebraska	7–1–1	5–0	1st	
Nebraska:		23–7–3	16–4–1		
Washburn Ichabods (Central Intercollegiate Conference) (1929–1934)
1929	Washburn	5–6	4–2	2nd	
1930	Washburn	8–2	6–0	1st	
1931	Washburn	7–3	5–1	T–1st	
1932	Washburn	6–3–1	4–1–1	T–2nd	
1933	Washburn	4–6–1	2–3–1	4th	
1934	Washburn	2–6–1	2–3	T–4th	
Washburn Ichabods (Missouri Valley Conference) (1935)
1935	Washburn	4–6	1–2	T–5th	
Washburn:		47–34–4			
Total:		70–41–7			
National championship Conference title Conference division title or championship game berth
