= John Sullivan (American football coach) =

American football player and coach (1938–2010)

Biographical details
- Born: May 10, 1938; Spencer, Iowa, U.S.
- Died: November 27, 2010 (aged 72); Ames, Iowa, U.S.

Playing career
- 1956–1959: Iowa State Teachers

Coaching career (HC unless noted)
- 1961–1965: Ellsworth
- 1966–1970: Simpson (IA)

Head coaching record
- Overall: 30–11–3 (college); 29–9–2 (junior college)

Accomplishments and honors

Championships
- 1 Iowa Conference (1969)

Awards
- Iowa Conference Coach of the Year (1969)

John Louis Sullivan (May 10, 1938 – November 27, 2010) was an American football player and coach. He served as the head football coach at Simpson College in Indianola, Iowa from 1966 to 1970, compiling a record of 30–11–3. He was also instrumental in reviving the football program at Ellsworth Community College in Iowa Falls, Iowa.

Sullivan then became a teacher after his football career.

== Head coaching record ==
=== College ===
Year	Team	Overall	Conference	Standing	Bowl/playoffs
Simpson Redmen (Iowa Conference) (1966–1970)
1966	Simpson	3–5	2–5	6th	
1967	Simpson	7–1–1	6–1	2nd	
1968	Simpson	6–1–2	5–0–2	2nd	
1969	Simpson	8–2	6–1	1st	
1970	Simpson	6–2	5–2	3rd	
Simpson:		30–11–3	24–9–2		
Total:		30–11–3			
National championship Conference title Conference division title or championship game berth
