= Perry W. Jenkins =

American coach and politician

Biographical details
- Born: April 5, 1867; Mount Carmel, Indiana, U.S.
- Died: June 19, 1955 (aged 88); Salt Lake City, Utah, U.S.

Playing career
- 1886–1889: Miami (OH)
- Position: Quarterback

Coaching career (HC unless noted)
- 1895: Simpson (IA)

Head coaching record
- Overall: 1–1–1

Perry Wilson Jenkins (April 5, 1867 – June 19, 1955) was an American college football player and coach, college president, and state senator. He served as the head football coach at Simpson College in Indianola, Iowa in 1895, compiling a record of 1–1–1. Prior to that, Jenkins was a started quarterback at Miami University in Oxford, Ohio.

Jenkins served as the president of Amity College in College Springs, Iowa in the mid-1890s. He later served as the President of the Wyoming State Senate in 1927. He is nicknamed "The Father of Sublette County, Wyoming".

== Head coaching record ==
Year	Team	Overall	Conference	Standing	Bowl/playoffs
Simpson Red and Gold (Independent) (1895)
1895	Simpson	1–1–1			
Simpson:		1–1–1			
Total:		1–1–1			
