= C. Noel Workman =

Biographical details
- Born: May 26, 1897
- Died: August 29, 1975 (aged 78); Ramsey County, Minnesota, U.S.

Playing career

Football
- 1920–1921: Ohio State
- Position: End

Coaching career (HC unless noted)

Football
- 1923–1925: Simpson (IA)
- 1926–1930: Iowa State

Basketball
- 1923–1926: Simpson (IA)

Baseball
- 1923: Simpson (IA)
- 1929–1930: Iowa State

Head coaching record
- Overall: 33–30–5 (football); 29–22 (basketball); 15–27 (baseball)

Accomplishments and honors

Championships
- Football; 3 IIAC (1923–1925)

Charles Noel Workman (May 26, 1897 – August 29, 1975) was an American football player and coach of football, basketball, and baseball. He was the head football coach at Simpson College from 1923 to 1925 and also at Iowa State University from 1926 to 1930, compiling a career college football coaching record of 33–30–5. Workman was also the head basketball coach at Simpson from 1923 to 1926, tallying a mark of 29–22, and the head baseball coach at Simpson in 1923 and at Iowa State from 1929 to 1930, amassing a career college baseball coaching record of 15–27.

Workman graduated from Ohio State University in 1923. He was the older brother of Hoge Workman, who was his teammate at Ohio State.

== Head coaching record ==
=== Football ===
Year	Team	Overall	Conference	Standing	Bowl/playoffs
Simpson Red and Gold (Iowa Conference) (1923–1925)
1923	Simpson	8–1	7–1	1st	
1924	Simpson	8–0–1	7–0–1	1st	
1925	Simpson	6–2–1	5–1	T–1st	
Simpson:		22–3–2	19–2–1		
Iowa State Cyclones (Missouri Valley Intercollegiate Athletic Association / Big Six Conference) (1926–1930)
1926	Iowa State	4–3–1	3–3–1	T–6th	
1927	Iowa State	4–3–1	3–2	4th	
1928	Iowa State	2–5–1	2–2–1	4th	
1929	Iowa State	1–7	0–5	6th	
1930	Iowa State	0–9	0–5	6th	
Iowa State:		11–27–3	8–17–2		
Total:		33–30–5			
National championship Conference title Conference division title or championship game berth
