= Ken Heizer =

American football player and coach (1924–2011)

Biographical details
- Born: February 8, 1924; Las Animas, Colorado, U.S.
- Died: February 17, 2011 (aged 87); Longmont, Colorado, U.S.

Playing career
- 1942: Daniel Field
- 1946–1948: Western State (CO)
- Position: Center

Coaching career (HC unless noted)
- 1962–1965: Simpson (IA)

Head coaching record
- Overall: 14–22

Kenneth Edwin Heizer (February 8, 1924 – February 17, 2011) was an American football player and coach. He served as the head football coach at Simpson College in Indianola, Iowa from 1962 to 1965, compiling a record of 14–22. Heizer played college football at Western State College of Colorado—now known as Western Colorado University—in Gunnison, Colorado. He also served as a scout for the Denver Broncos of the National Football League (NFL).

== Head coaching record ==
Year	Team	Overall	Conference	Standing	Bowl/playoffs
Simpson Redmen (Iowa Conference) (1962–1965)
1962	Simpson	0–9	0–9	9th	
1963	Simpson	5–4	5–4	3rd	
1964	Simpson	6–3	5–3	3rd	
1965	Simpson	3–6	2–5	7th	
Simpson:		14–22	12–21		
Total:		14–22			
