= 1927 Kansas Jayhawks football team =

American college football season

1927 Kansas Jayhawks football
- Conference: Missouri Valley Conference
- Record: 3–4–1 (3–3–1 MVC)
- Head coach: Franklin Cappon (2nd season)
- Captain: Barrett Hamilton
- Home stadium: Memorial Stadium

1927 Missouri Valley Conference football standings
	Conf.					Overall
Team	W		L		T	W		L		T
Missouri $	5	–	1	–	0	7	–	2	–	0
No. 9 Nebraska	4	–	1	–	0	6	–	2	–	0
Oklahoma A&M	2	–	1	–	0	4	–	4	–	0
Iowa State	3	–	2	–	0	4	–	3	–	1
Washington University	2	–	2	–	1	5	–	2	–	2
Kansas	3	–	3	–	1	3	–	4	–	1
Oklahoma	2	–	3	–	0	3	–	3	–	2
Kansas State	2	–	4	–	0	3	–	5	–	0
Drake	1	–	2	–	0	3	–	6	–	0
Grinnell	0	–	5	–	0	0	–	7	–	1
$ – Conference champion; Rankings from Dickinson System

The 1927 Kansas Jayhawks football team represented the University of Kansas in the Missouri Valley Conference during the 1927 college football season. In their second and final season under head coach Franklin Cappon, the Jayhawks compiled a 3–4–1 record (3–3–1 against conference opponents), finished in fifth place in the conference, and were outscored by opponents by a combined total of 146 to 89. They played their home games at Memorial Stadium in Lawrence, Kansas; the stadium's capacity was increased to 35,000 in 1927 with completion of the north bowl. Barrett Hamilton was the team captain.

== Schedule ==
Date	Opponent	Site	Result	Attendance	Source
October 1	at Grinnell	Grinnell, IA	W 19–0		
October 8	Wisconsin*	Memorial Stadium; Madison, WI	L 6–26		
October 15	Kansas State	Memorial Stadium; Lawrence, KS (rivalry)	L 2–13		
October 22	Washington University	Memorial Stadium; Lawrence, KS	T 21–21		
October 29	Drake	Memorial Stadium; Lawrence, KS	W 7–6		
November 5	at Nebraska	Memorial Stadium; Lincoln, NE (rivalry)	L 13–47		
November 12	at Oklahoma	Memorial Stadium; Norman, OK	L 7–26		
November 19	Missouri^{†}	Memorial Stadium; Lawrence, KS (rivalry)	W 14–7		
*Non-conference game; ^{†}Homecoming
