= Bob Higgins (American football) =

American football player and coach (1893–1969)

Biographical details
- Born: November 24, 1893; Corning, New York, U.S.
- Died: June 6, 1969 (aged 75); Bellefonte, Pennsylvania, U.S.

Playing career
- 1914–1917: Penn State
- 1919: Penn State
- 1920–1921: Canton Bulldogs
- Position: End

Coaching career (HC unless noted)
- 1920: West Virginia Wesleyan
- 1922–1924: West Virginia Wesleyan
- 1925–1927: Washington University
- 1928–1929: Penn State (assistant)
- 1930–1948: Penn State

Head coaching record
- Overall: 123–83–16
- Bowls: 1–0–1

Accomplishments and honors

Awards
- 2× Consensus All-American (1915, 1919)
- College Football Hall of Fame; Inducted in 1954 (profile)

Robert A. Higgins (November 24, 1893 – June 6, 1969) was an American football player and coach. He played college football at Pennsylvania State University, where he was a three-time All-American. He then played professionally with the Canton Bulldogs from 1920 to 1921. Higgins served as the head football coach at West Virginia Wesleyan College (1920, 1922–1924), Washington University in St. Louis (1925–1927), and Pennsylvania State University, compiling a career college football record of 123–83–16. He was inducted into the College Football Hall of Fame as a coach in 1954.

== Playing career ==
=== Collegiate ===
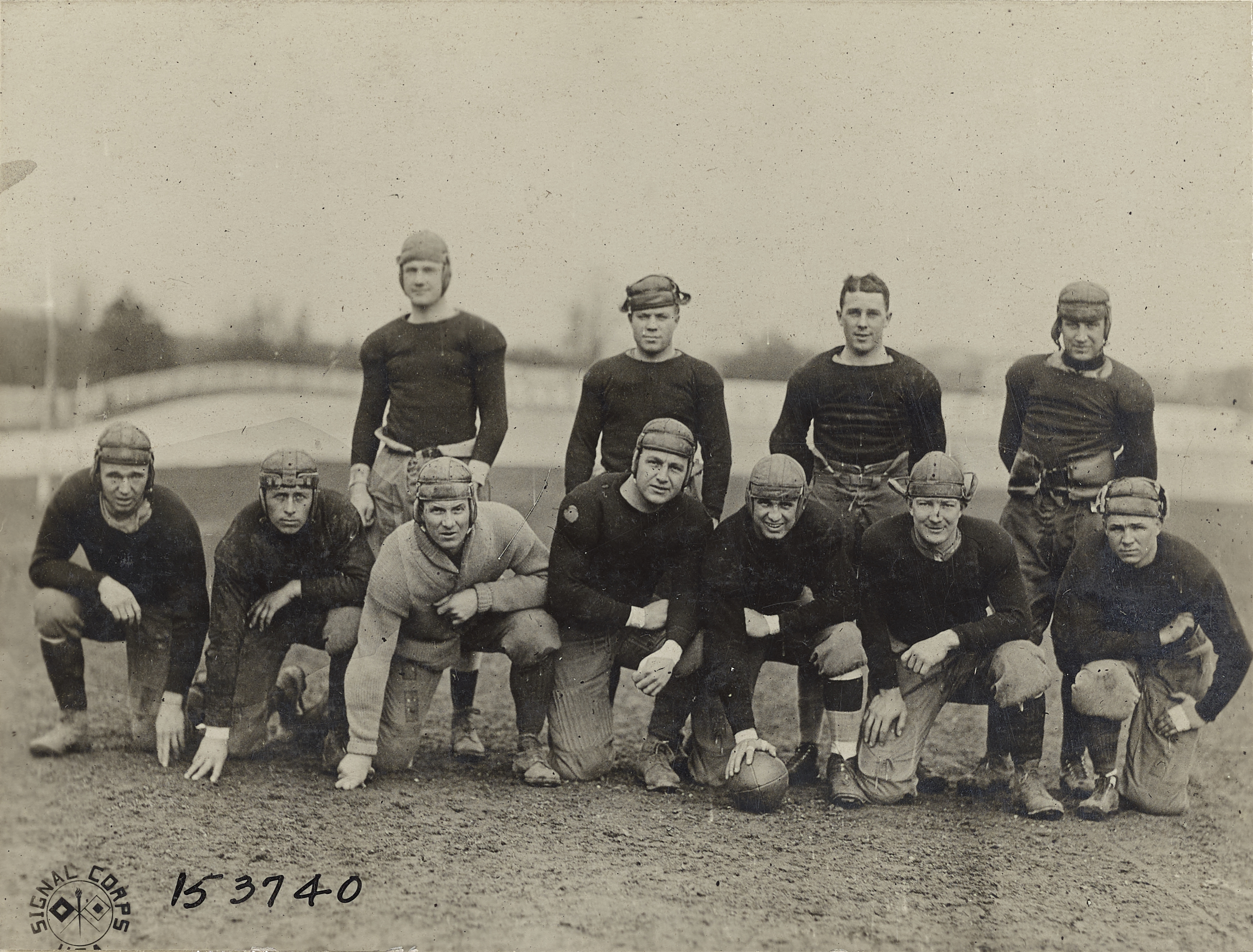
89th Division team, Higgins in front row at left

Higgins played at Penn State from 1914 to 1917, and was named an All-American in 1915. During World War I, he left Penn State to serve as a U.S. Army officer in France. As part of the occupation force after the Armistice, Higgins played right end for the 89th Division squad that won the AEF football championship in March 1919. After being discharged, he returned to captain Penn State, earning All-America honors again in 1919. In a 20–0 victory over Pittsburgh that season, Higgins caught a pass from Walter Hess and turned it into a thrilling 92-yard touchdown and was immortalized in Knute Rockne's "Great Football Plays."

=== Professional ===
In 1920 and 1921, Higgins played end for the Canton Bulldogs of the National Football League.

== Coaching career ==
Higgins coached four seasons at West Virginia Wesleyan (1920, 1922–1924), and three seasons at Washington University in St. Louis. He returned to Penn State in 1928, first as an assistant coach, before becoming head coach in 1930. He served as head coach there for the next 19 seasons. He led the Nittany Lions to only the second unbeaten season in the school's history, culminating in a tie versus Southern Methodist University in the 1948 Cotton Bowl Classic. It marked only the second time that Penn State had played in a bowl game.

Ill health forced Higgins' retirement after the 1948 season, but he remained at Penn State as a special assistant in the Physical Education Department until his retirement in November 1951. His overall coaching record was 123–83–16. He was inducted into the College Football Hall of Fame in 1954.

== Family ==
Higgins was a brother of Margaret Sanger, famed campaigner for birth control, family planning and social reform. His youngest daughter, Nancy, married James J. Dooley Jr., who was a second-team All-American center in 1952 at Penn State. Their son, James J. Dooley III, played football at Penn State from 1979 to 1981. Their other son, Peter Dooley, was on the cross country and track and field teams at Penn State from 1982 to 1984. Higgin's eldest grandson, Robert Lyford, son of Higgins eldest daughter Mary Ann, played basketball at Penn State during the late 1960s.

Higgins' daughter Virginia ("Ginger") married All-American guard and fellow College Football Hall of Fame inductee Steve Suhey. He is the maternal grandfather of Penn State standouts Paul Suhey, Larry Suhey, and former Chicago Bears fullback, Matt Suhey. More recently, Paul's son, Kevin, and Matt's son, Joe, have played for the Nittany Lions. The Higgins-Suhey family has been called the "first family of Penn State football", with 90 years of involvement with the program.

== Head coaching record ==
Year	Team	Overall	Conference	Standing	Bowl/playoffs	AP^{#}
West Virginia Wesleyan Bobcats (Independent) (1920)
1920	West Virginia Wesleyan	4–4–1				
West Virginia Wesleyan Bobcats (Independent) (1922–1924)
1922	West Virginia Wesleyan	8–2				
1923	West Virginia Wesleyan	3–4–1				
1924	West Virginia Wesleyan	9–2			W Dixie Classic	
West Virginia Wesleyan:		24–12–2				
Washington University Pikers/Bears (Missouri Valley Conference) (1925–1927)
1925	Washington University	2–5–1	1–4–1	9th		
1926	Washington University	1–7	0–6	10th		
1927	Washington University	5–2–2	2–2–1	T–5th		
Washington University:		8–14–3	3–12–2			
Penn State Nittany Lions (Independent) (1930–1948)
1930	Penn State	3–4–2				
1931	Penn State	2–8				
1932	Penn State	2–5				
1933	Penn State	3–3–1				
1934	Penn State	4–4				
1935	Penn State	4–4				
1936	Penn State	3–5				
1937	Penn State	5–3				
1938	Penn State	3–4–1				
1939	Penn State	5–1–2				
1940	Penn State	6–1–1				
1941	Penn State	7–2				
1942	Penn State	6–1–1				19
1943	Penn State	5–3–1				
1944	Penn State	6–3				
1945	Penn State	5–3				
1946	Penn State	6–2				
1947	Penn State	9–0–1			T Cotton	4
1948	Penn State	7–1–1				18
Penn State:		91–57–11				
Total:		123–83–16				
^{#}Rankings from final AP Poll.

== See also ==
- List of College Football Hall of Fame inductees (coaches)
