= Simpson Storm football =

College football team

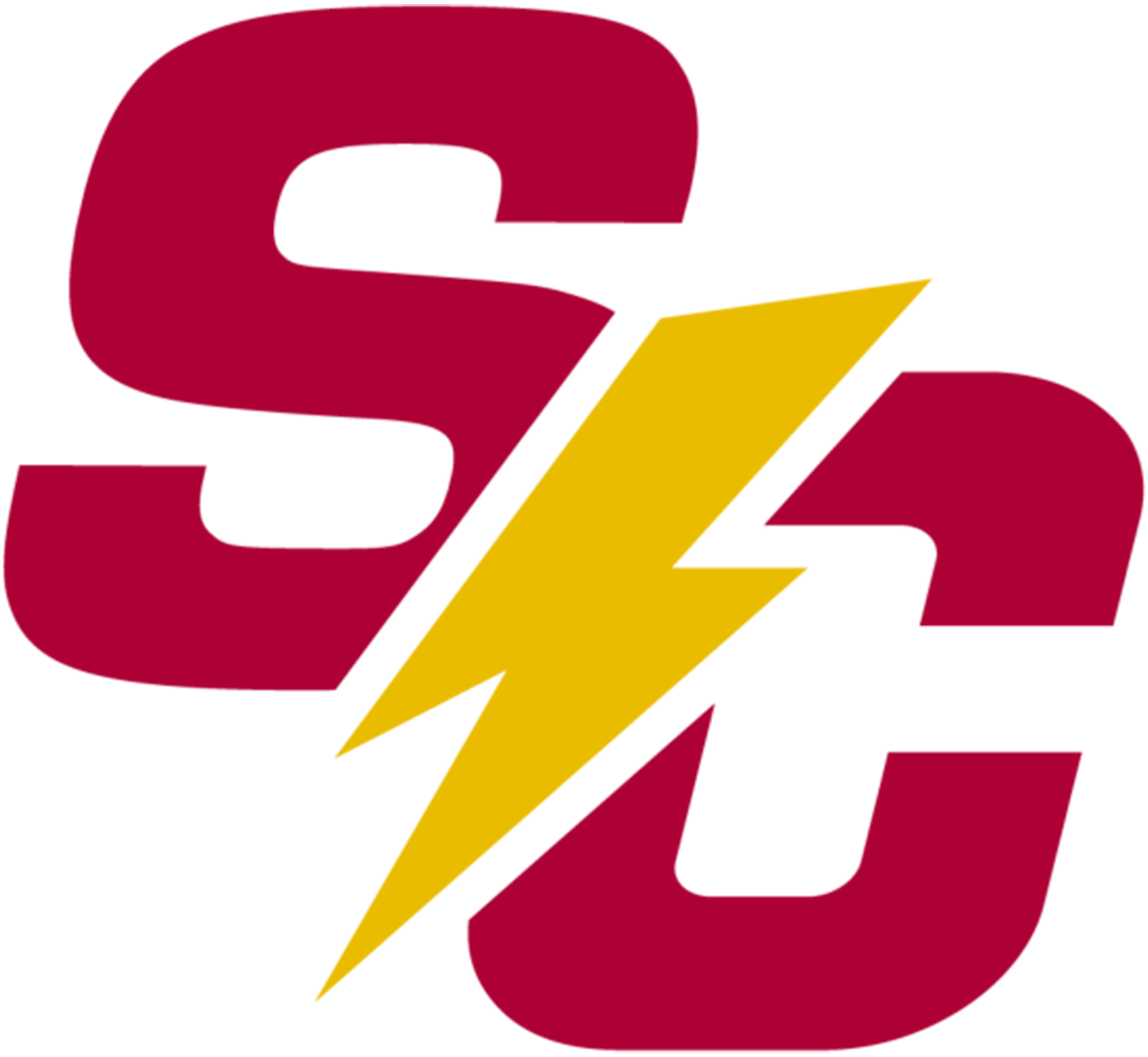
- First season: 1893; 133 years ago
- Athletic director: Marty Bell
- Head coach: Reed Hoskins; 3rd season, 14–16 (.467)
- Location: Indianola, Iowa
- Stadium: Bill Buxton Stadium (capacity: 5,000)
- NCAA division: Division III
- Conference: ARC
- Colors: Red and Gold
- All-time record: 498–559–36 (.472)
- Bowl record: 0–1 (.000)

Conference championships
- 12
- Rivalries: Central
- Mascot: Storm
- Website: athletics.central.edu

The Simpson Storm football team represents Simpson College in college football at the NCAA Division III level. The Storm are members of the American Rivers Conference (ARC), fielding its team in the ARC since 1923 when it was named the Iowa Intercollegiate Athletic Conference (IIAC). The Storm play their home games at Bill Buxton Stadium in Indianola, Iowa. Bill Buxton Stadium was previously known as Neff Field from 1949 until it was renamed in 1998. Prior to 1949, the team played at Buxton Park.

Their head coach is Reed Hoskins, who took over the position for the 2023 season.

== Conference affiliations ==
- Iowa Intercollegiate Athletic Conference (1922–2017; rebranded)
- American Rivers Conference (2018–present)

== Championships ==
=== Conference championships ===
Simpson claims 12 conference titles, the most recent of which came in 1997.

Year	Conference	Overall Record	Conference Record	Coach
1923	Iowa Intercollegiate Athletic Conference	8–1	7–0	C. Noel Workman
1924	Iowa Intercollegiate Athletic Conference	8–0–1	7–0–1	C. Noel Workman
1925†	Iowa Intercollegiate Athletic Conference	6–2–1	5–1	C. Noel Workman
1931	Iowa Intercollegiate Athletic Conference	7–3	6–0	Lloyd Dean
1933	Iowa Intercollegiate Athletic Conference	7–2–1	6–0–1	Lloyd Dean
1934	Iowa Intercollegiate Athletic Conference	3–5–2	3–2–1	Lloyd Dean
1949	Iowa Intercollegiate Athletic Conference	8–1	6–0	R. G. Miller
1969	Iowa Intercollegiate Athletic Conference	8–2	6–1	John Sullivan
1988	Iowa Intercollegiate Athletic Conference	9–2	8–0	Jim Williams
1991	Iowa Intercollegiate Athletic Conference	10–1	8–0	Jim Williams
1996	Iowa Intercollegiate Athletic Conference	10–1	8–0	Jim Williams
1997	Iowa Intercollegiate Athletic Conference	12–1	8–0	Jim Williams

† Co-champions

== Postseason games ==
=== Division III playoff games ===
The Storm have appeared in the Division III playoffs six times with an overall record of 2–6.

Season	Coach	Playoff	Opponent	Result
1988	Jim Williams	First round	Wisconsin–Whitewater	L 27–29
1989	Jim Williams	First round	Saint John's (MN)	L 35–42
1991	Jim Williams	First round	Wisconsin–La Crosse	L 13–28
1996	Jim Williams	First round	Saint John's (MN)	L 18–21
1997	Jim Williams	First round Quarterfinals; Semifinals	Wisconsin–Whitewater; Augsburg; Mount Union	W 34–31; W 61–21; L 7–54
2003	Jay Niemann	First round	St. Norbert	L 20–26 ^{2OT}

=== Bowl games ===
Simpson has participated in one bowl game, and has a record of 0–1.

Season	Coach	Bowl	Opponent	Result
1969	John Sullivan	Mineral Water Bowl	Saint John's (MN)	L 0–21

== List of head coaches ==
=== Key ===
Key to symbols in coaches list
General		Overall		Conference		Postseason (Note: Although the first Rose Bowl Game was played in 1902, it has been continuously played since the 1916 game, and is recognized as the oldest bowl game by the NCAA. "—" indicates any season prior to 1916 when postseason games were not played.)	
No.	Order of coaches (Note: A running total of the number of head coaches, with coaches who served separate tenures being counted only once. Interim head coaches are represented with "Int" and are not counted in the running total. "—" indicates the team played but either without a coach or no coach is on record. "X" indicates an interim year without play.)	GC	Games coached	CW	Conference wins	PW	Postseason wins
DC	Division championships	OW	Overall wins	CL	Conference losses	PL	Postseason losses
CC	Conference championships	OL	Overall losses	CT	Conference ties	PT	Postseason ties
NC	National championships	OT	Overall ties (Note: Overtime rules in college football were introduced in 1996, making ties impossible in the period since.)	C%	Conference winning percentage		
†	Elected to the College Football Hall of Fame	O%	Overall winning percentage (Note: When computing the win–loss percentage, a tie counts as half a win and half a loss.)				

=== Coaches ===
List of head football coaches showing season(s) coached, overall records, conference records, postseason records, championships and selected awards
No.	Name	Season(s)	GC	OW	OL	OT	O%	CW	CL	CT	C%	PW	PL	PT	DC	CC	NC	Awards
1	Charles Cheney	1893	5	5	0	0	1.000	–	–	–	–	–	–	–	–	–	–	–
2	unknown	1894; 1897	10	4	5	1	0.450	–	–	–	–	–	–	–	–	–	–	–
3	Perry W. Jenkins	1895	3	1	1	1	0.500	–	–	–	–	–	–	–	–	–	–	–
4	J. M. Jackson	1896	5	2	3	0	0.400	–	–	–	–	–	–	–	–	–	–	–
5	Hal McNeil	1898–1899	13	8	5	0	0.615	–	–	–	–	–	–	–	–	–	–	–
6	Paul Coldren	1900	9	6	2	1	0.722	–	–	–	–	–	–	–	–	–	–	–
7	John Griffith	1901	9	7	1	1	0.833	–	–	–	–	–	–	–	–	–	–	–
8	Graham Reid	1902–1905	27	10	17	0	0.370	–	–	–	–	–	–	–	–	–	–	–
9	R. N. Post	1908	6	5	1	0	0.542	–	–	–	–	–	–	–	–	–	–	–
10	Carroll N. Kirk	1909–1910	14	9	5	0	0.643	–	–	–	–	–	–	–	–	–	–	–
11	Harold Iddings	1911–1913	14	5	9	0	0.357	–	–	–	–	–	–	–	–	–	–	–
12	Arthur Aston	1914	7	2	4	1	0.357	–	–	–	–	–	–	–	–	–	–	–
13	Archie Kirk	1915	8	2	6	0	0.250	–	–	–	–	–	–	–	–	–	–	–
14	Chester C. Dillon	1916–1917	13	2	10	1	0.192	–	–	–	–	–	–	–	–	–	–	–
15	Nile Graves	1918–1920	21	8	12	1	0.405	–	–	–	–	–	–	–	–	–	–	–
16	Cecil Cushman	1921–1922	15	6	8	1	0.433	–	–	–	–	–	–	–	–	–	–	–
17	C. Noel Workman	1923–1925	27	22	3	2	0.852	20	1	1	0.932	–	–	–	–	3	–	–
18	Hoge Workman	1926–1930	43	21	19	3	0.523	19	8	3	0.683	–	–	–	–	–	–	–
19	Lloyd Dean	1931–1934	40	22	14	4	0.600	19	3	3	0.820	–	–	–	–	3	–	–
20	Frank Casey	1935–1939; 1942–1947	87	22	60	5	0.282	14	30	2	0.326	–	–	–	–	–	–	–
21	Bob Waldorf	1940–1941	18	4	12	2	0.278	2	8	1	0.227	–	–	–	–	–	–	–
22	R. G. Miller	1948–1957	83	34	47	2	0.422	26	30	3	0.466	–	–	–	–	1	–	–
23	E.G. Booth	1958–1961	34	3	30	1	0.103	2	29	1	0.078	–	–	–	–	–	–	–
24	Ken Heizer	1962–1965	36	14	22	0	0.389	12	21	0	0.364	–	–	–	–	–	–	–
25	John Sullivan	1966–1970	44	30	11	3	0.716	24	9	2	0.714	0	1	0	–	1	–	–
26	Al Paone	1971–1973	27	9	15	3	0.389	6	12	3	0.357	–	–	–	–	–	–	–
27	Larry Johnson	1974	9	2	6	1	0.278	2	5	0	0.286	–	–	–	–	–	–	–
28	Maury Waugh	1975–1979	45	15	30	0	0.333	10	25	0	0.286	–	–	–	–	–	–	–
29	Alex Glann	1980–1984	45	17	28	0	0.378	10	25	0	0.286	–	–	–	–	–	–	–
30	Lloyd Krumlauf	1985–1986	18	4	14	0	0.222	4	11	0	0.267	–	–	–	–	–	–	–
31	Jim Williams	1987–2001	155	106	48	1	0.687	93	34	0	0.732	2	5	0	–	4	–	–
32	Jay Niemann	2002–2007	61	32	29	0	0.525	26	23	0	0.531	0	1	0	–	–	–	–
33	Jim Glogowski	2008–2015	80	37	43	0	0.463	26	34	0	0.433	–	–	–	–	–	–	–
34	Matt Jeter	2016–2022	61	22	39	0	0.361	18	31	0	0.367	–	–	–	–	–	–	–
35	Reed Hoskins	2023–present	30	14	16	0	0.467	11	13	0	0.458	–	–	–	–	–	–	–

== Year-by-year results ==
National champions	Conference champions	Bowl game berth	Playoff berth

Season	Year	Head coach	Association	Division	Conference	Record							Postseason	Final ranking
Season	Year	Head coach	Association	Division	Conference	Overall			Conference				Postseason	Final ranking
Season	Year	Head coach	Association	Division	Conference	Win	Loss	Tie	Finish	Win	Loss	Tie	Postseason	Final ranking
Simpson Red and Gold
1893	1893	Charles Cheney	—	—	—	5	0	0	–	–	–	–	—	—
1894	1894	unknown	—	—	—	3	3	1	–	–	–	–	—	—
1895	1895	Perry W. Jenkins	—	—	—	1	1	1	–	–	–	–	—	—
1896	1896	J. M. Jackson	—	—	—	2	3	0	–	–	–	–	—	—
1897	1897	unknown	—	—	—	1	2	0	–	–	–	–	—	—
1898	1898	Hal McNeil	—	—	—	3	3	0	–	–	–	–	—	—
1899	1899	Hal McNeil	—	—	—	5	2	0	–	–	–	–	—	—
1900	1900	Paul Coldren	—	—	—	6	2	1	–	–	–	–	—	—
1901	1901	John Griffith	—	—	—	7	1	1	–	–	–	–	—	—
1902	1902	Graham Reid	—	—	—	5	3	0	–	–	–	–	—	—
1903	1903	Graham Reid	—	—	—	1	4	0	–	–	–	–	—	—
1904	1904	Graham Reid	—	—	—	1	5	0	–	–	–	–	—	—
1905	1905	Graham Reid	IAAUS	—	—	3	5	0	–	–	–	–	—	—
Sport dropped 1906–1907
1908	1908	R. N. Post	IAAUS	—	—	5	1	0	–	–	–	–	—	—
1909	1909	Carroll N. Kirk	IAAUS	—	—	5	2	0	–	–	–	–	—	—
1910	1910	Carroll N. Kirk	NCAA	—	—	4	3	0	–	–	–	–	—	—
1911	1911	Harold Iddings	NCAA	—	—	0	5	0	–	–	–	–	—	—
1912	1912	Harold Iddings	NCAA	—	—	1	2	0	–	–	–	–	—	—
1913	1913	Harold Iddings	NCAA	—	—	4	2	0	–	–	–	–	—	—
1914	1914	Arthur Aston	NCAA	—	—	2	4	1	–	–	–	–	—	—
1915	1915	Archie Kirk	NCAA	—	—	2	6	0	–	–	–	–	—	—
1916	1916	Chester C. Dillon	NCAA	—	—	2	3	0	–	–	–	–	—	—
1917	1917	Chester C. Dillon	NCAA	—	—	0	7	1	–	–	–	–	—	—
1918	1918	Nile Graves	NCAA	—	—	4	3	0	–	–	–	–	—	—
1919	1919	Nile Graves	NCAA	—	—	3	3	1	–	–	–	–	—	—
1920	1920	Nile Graves	NCAA	–	—	1	6	0	–	–	–	–	—	—
1921	1921	Cecil Cushman	NCAA	–	—	2	5	0	–	–	–	–	—	—
1922	1922	Cecil Cushman	NCAA	–	—	4	3	1	–	–	–	–	—	—
1923	1923	C. Noel Workman	NCAA	–	IIAC	8	1	0	1st	7	0	0	IIAC champion	—
1924	1924	C. Noel Workman	NCAA	–	IIAC	8	0	1	1st	7	0	1	IIAC champion	—
1925	1925	C. Noel Workman	NCAA	–	IIAC	6	2	1	t–1st	6	1	0	IIAC champion	—
1926	1926	Hoge Workman	NCAA	–	IIAC	4	3	1	3rd	3	1	1	—	—
1927	1927	Hoge Workman	NCAA	–	IIAC	5	3	0	3rd	4	1	0	—	—
1928	1928	Hoge Workman	NCAA	–	IIAC	4	4	1	8th	4	2	1	—	—
1929	1929	Hoge Workman	NCAA	–	IIAC	5	4	0	6th	5	2	0	—	—
Simpson Redmen
1930	1930	Hoge Workman	NCAA	–	IIAC	3	5	1	7th	3	2	1	—	—
1931	1931	Lloyd Dean	NCAA	–	IIAC	7	3	0	1st	6	0	0	IIAC champion	—
1932	1932	Lloyd Dean	NCAA	–	IIAC	5	4	1	4th	4	1	1	—	—
1933	1933	Lloyd Dean	NCAA	–	IIAC	7	2	1	1st	6	0	1	IIAC champion	—
1934	1934	Lloyd Dean	NCAA	–	IIAC	3	5	2	6th	3	2	1	IIAC champion	—
1935	1935	Frank Casey	NCAA	–	IIAC	1	8	0	10th	1	5	0	—	—
1936	1936	Frank Casey	NCAA	–	IIAC	3	6	0	8th	2	4	0	—	—
1937	1937	Frank Casey	NCAA	–	IIAC	0	9	0	13th	0	6	0	—	—
1938	1938	Frank Casey	NCAA	–	IIAC	1	8	0	12th	1	4	0	—	—
1939	1939	Frank Casey	NCAA	–	IIAC	1	8	0	11th	1	5	0	—	—
1940	1940	Bob Waldorf	NCAA	–	IIAC	1	7	1	11th	1	4	1	—	—
1941	1941	Bob Waldorf	NCAA	–	IIAC	3	5	1	10th	1	4	0	—	—
1942	1942	Frank Casey	NCAA	–	IIAC	4	3	0	4th	4	1	0	—	—
1943	1943	Frank Casey	NCAA	–	IIAC	1	3	0	— (Note: No IIAC play due to WWII)				—	—
1944	1944	Frank Casey	NCAA	–	IIAC	3	1	2	—				—	—
1945	1945	Frank Casey	NCAA	–	IIAC	2	5	0	5th	1	2	0	—	—
1946	1946	Frank Casey	NCAA	–	IIAC	3	5	1	7th	2	2	0	—	—
1947	1947	Frank Casey	NCAA	–	IIAC	3	4	2	6th	2	1	2	—	—
1948	1948	R. G. Miller	NCAA	–	IIAC	2	7	0	10th	2	4	0	—	—
1949	1949	R. G. Miller	NCAA	–	IIAC	8	1	0	1st	6	0	0	IIAC champion	—
1950	1950	R. G. Miller	NCAA	–	IIAC	3	6	0	4th (South)	1	4	0	—	—
1951	1951	R. G. Miller	NCAA	–	IIAC	2	7	0	4th (South)	1	4	0	—	—
1952	1952	R. G. Miller	NCAA	–	IIAC	3	5	0	3rd (South)	2	2	0	—	—
1953	1953	R. G. Miller	NCAA	–	IIAC	0	8	0	5th (South)	0	4	0	—	—
1954	1954	R. G. Miller	NCAA	–	IIAC	1	5	2	8th	0	4	2	—	—
1955	1955	R. G. Miller	NCAA	College Division	IIAC	6	2	0	3rd	5	2	0	—	—
1956	1956	R. G. Miller	NCAA	College Division	IIAC	5	2	1	3rd	5	2	1	—	—
1957	1957	R. G. Miller	NCAA	College Division	IIAC	4	4	0	4th	4	4	0	—	—
1958	1958	E.G. Booth	NCAA	College Division	IIAC	2	5	1	7th	2	5	1	—	—
1959	1959	E.G. Booth	NCAA	College Division	IIAC	0	8	0	9th	0	8	0	—	—
1960	1960	E.G. Booth	NCAA	College Division	IIAC	0	9	0	9th	0	8	0	—	—
1961	1961	E.G. Booth	NCAA	College Division	IIAC	1	8	0	9th	0	8	0	—	—
1962	1962	Ken Heizer	NCAA	College Division	IIAC	0	9	0	9th	0	9	0	—	—
1963	1963	Ken Heizer	NCAA	College Division	IIAC	5	4	0	3rd	5	4	0	—	—
1964	1964	Ken Heizer	NCAA	College Division	IIAC	6	3	0	3rd	5	3	0	—	—
1965	1965	Ken Heizer	NCAA	College Division	IIAC	3	6	0	7th	2	5	0	—	—
1966	1966	John Sullivan	NCAA	College Division	IIAC	3	5	0	6th	2	5	0	—	—
1967	1967	John Sullivan	NCAA	College Division	IIAC	7	1	1	2nd	6	1	0	—	—
1968	1968	John Sullivan	NCAA	College Division	IIAC	6	1	2	2nd	5	0	2	—	—
1969	1969	John Sullivan	NCAA	College Division	IIAC	8	2	0	1st	6	1	0	L Mineral Water Bowl	—
1970	1970	John Sullivan	NCAA	College Division	IIAC	6	2	0	3rd	5	2	0	—	—
1971	1971	Al Paone	NCAA	College Division	IIAC	5	4	0	5th	4	3	0	—	—
1972	1972	Al Paone	NCAA	College Division	IIAC	2	5	2	6th	1	4	2	—	—
1973	1973	Al Paone	NCAA	Division III	IIAC	2	6	1	7th	1	5	1	—	—
1974	1974	Larry Johnson	NCAA	Division III	IIAC	2	6	1	6th	2	5	0	—	—
1975	1975	Maury Waugh	NCAA	Division III	IIAC	2	7	0	8th	1	6	0	—	—
1976	1976	Maury Waugh	NCAA	Division III	IIAC	4	5	0	6th	3	4	0	—	—
1977	1977	Maury Waugh	NCAA	Division III	IIAC	2	7	0	7th	2	5	0	—	—
1978	1978	Maury Waugh	NCAA	Division III	IIAC	4	5	0	6th	2	5	0	—	—
1979	1979	Maury Waugh	NCAA	Division III	IIAC	3	6	0	6th	2	5	0	—	—
1980	1980	Alex Gann	NCAA	Division III	IIAC	5	4	0	5th	3	4	0	—	—
1981	1981	Alex Gann	NCAA	Division III	IIAC	3	6	0	6th	2	5	0	—	—
1982	1982	Alex Gann	NCAA	Division III	IIAC	4	5	0	6th	2	5	0	—	—
1983	1983	Alex Gann	NCAA	Division III	IIAC	3	6	0	6th	2	5	0	—	—
1984	1984	Alex Gann	NCAA	Division III	IIAC	2	7	0	t–7th	1	6	0	—	—
1985	1985	Lloyd Krumlauf	NCAA	Division III	IIAC	3	6	0	6th	3	4	0	—	—
1986	1986	Lloyd Krumlauf	NCAA	Division III	IIAC	1	8	0	7th	1	7	0	—	—
1987	1987	Jim Williams	NCAA	Division III	IIAC	3	6	0	6th	3	5	0	—	—
1988	1988	Jim Williams	NCAA	Division III	IIAC	9	2	0	1st	8	0	0	L NCAA Division III First Round	—
1989	1989	Jim Williams	NCAA	Division III	IIAC	8	3	0	2nd	7	1	0	L NCAA Division III First Round	—
1990	1990	Jim Williams	NCAA	Division III	IIAC	8	2	0	3rd	6	2	0	—	—
1991	1991	Jim Williams	NCAA	Division III	IIAC	10	1	0	1st	8	0	0	L NCAA Division III First Round	—
1992	1992	Jim Williams	NCAA	Division III	IIAC	6	2	1	2nd	6	2	0	—	—
Simpson Storm
1993	1993	Jim Williams	NCAA	Division III	IIAC	5	5	0	4th	5	3	0	—	—
1994	1994	Jim Williams	NCAA	Division III	IIAC	5	5	0	4th	5	3	0	—	—
1995	1995	Jim Williams	NCAA	Division III	IIAC	7	3	0	3rd	6	2	0	—	—
1996	1996	Jim Williams	NCAA	Division III	IIAC	10	1	0	1st	8	0	0	L NCAA Division III First Round	—
1997	1997	Jim Williams	NCAA	Division III	IIAC	12	1	0	1st	8	0	0	L NCAA Division III Semifinals	—
1998	1998	Jim Williams	NCAA	Division III	IIAC	7	3	0	t–3rd	7	3	0	—	—
1999	1999	Jim Williams	NCAA	Division III	IIAC	6	4	0	t–4th	6	4	0	—	—
2000	2000	Jim Williams	NCAA	Division III	IIAC	6	4	0	t–4th	6	4	0	—	—
2001	2001	Jim Williams	NCAA	Division III	IIAC	4	6	0	t–5th	4	5	0	—	—
2002	2002	Jay Niemann	NCAA	Division III	IIAC	6	4	0	4th	6	3	0	—	—
2003	2003	Jay Niemann	NCAA	Division III	IIAC	9	2	0	2nd	7	1	0	L NCAA Division III First Round	23
2004	2004	Jay Niemann	NCAA	Division III	IIAC	5	5	0	6th	4	4	0	—	—
2005	2005	Jay Niemann	NCAA	Division III	IIAC	5	5	0	6th	3	5	0	—	—
2006	2006	Jay Niemann	NCAA	Division III	IIAC	3	7	0	6th	3	5	0	—	—
2007	2007	Jay Niemann	NCAA	Division III	IIAC	4	6	0	t–6th	3	5	0	—	—
2008	2008	Jim Glogowski	NCAA	Division III	IIAC	7	3	0	t–3rd	5	3	0	—	—
2009	2009	Jim Glogowski	NCAA	Division III	IIAC	3	7	0	t–7th	2	6	0	—	—
2010	2010	Jim Glogowski	NCAA	Division III	IIAC	2	8	0	t–7th	2	6	0	—	—
2011	2011	Jim Glogowski	NCAA	Division III	IIAC	5	5	0	5th	5	3	0	—	—
2012	2012	Jim Glogowski	NCAA	Division III	IIAC	6	4	0	t–2nd	4	3	0	—	—
2013	2013	Jim Glogowski	NCAA	Division III	IIAC	7	3	0	2nd	5	2	0	—	—
2014	2014	Jim Glogowski	NCAA	Division III	IIAC	3	7	0	8th	0	7	0	—	—
2015	2015	Jim Glogowski	NCAA	Division III	IIAC	4	6	0	t–4th	3	4	0	—	—
2016	2016	Matt Jeter	NCAA	Division III	IIAC	3	7	0	t–7th	2	6	0	—	—
2017	2017	Matt Jeter	NCAA	Division III	IIAC	5	5	0	t–4th	4	4	0	—	—
2018	2018	Matt Jeter	NCAA	Division III	A-R-C	7	3	0	t–2nd	6	2	0	—	—
2019	2019	Matt Jeter	NCAA	Division III	A-R-C	5	5	0	t–5th	4	4	0	—	—
2020–21	2020–21	Matt Jeter	NCAA	Division III	A-R-C	0	1	0	— (Note: Official standings unavailable due to COVID-19)	0	1	0	—	—
2021	2021	Matt Jeter	NCAA	Division III	A-R-C	1	9	0	8th	1	7	0	—	—
2022	2022	Matt Jeter	NCAA	Division III	A-R-C	1	9	0	8th	1	7	0	—	—
2023	2023	Reed Hoskins	NCAA	Division III	A-R-C	3	7	0	t–6th	2	6	0	—	—
2024	2024	Reed Hoskins	NCAA	Division III	A-R-C	5	5	0	5th	4	4	0	—	—
2025	2025	Reed Hoskins	NCAA	Division III	A-R-C	6	4	0	4th	5	3	0	—	—
