= Bob Barrabee =

American football player (1905–1984)

No. 10
- Position: End

Personal information
- Born: January 23, 1905; Malden, Massachusetts, U.S.
- Died: June 3, 1984 (aged 79); Wall Township, New Jersey, U.S.
- Listed height: 5 ft 9 in (1.75 m)
- Listed weight: 190 lb (86 kg)

Career information
- High school: Malden; Cushing Academy (Ashburnham, Massachusetts)
- College: NYU (1925–1928)

Career history

Playing
- Staten Island Stapletons (1931)

Coaching
- Eastside HS (NJ) (1929) Line coach; Plainfield HS (NJ) (1929) Assistant coach; Newport HS (VT) (1933) Assistant coach

Awards and highlights
- Second-team All-American (1928); Second-team All-Eastern (1928)

Career NFL statistics
- Games played: 10
- Games started: 7
- Stats at Pro Football Reference

Robert Sidney Barrabee (January 23, 1905 – June 3, 1984) was an American professional football player, businessman, educator, and civic leader. He played college football for the NYU Violets from 1925 to 1928, followed by one season in the National Football League (NFL) for the Staten Island Stapletons in 1931.

== Early life ==
Robert Sidney Barrabee was born on January 23, 1905, in Malden, Massachusetts. He attended Malden High School, where he played football under head coach Jack Macdonald. After serving in a reserve role in 1921, Barrabee "was at his best and was a big cog in that Macdonald machine" in 1922. Listed as a 147 lb (67 kg) left end, he also played ice hockey and baseball at Malden.

Barrabee later attended the Cushing Academy in Ashburnham, Massachusetts, where he continued playing all three sports. In 1924, he helped the football team compile a 5–3 record as "one of the foremost preparatory school teams in New England" under the tutelege of first-year head coach Arthur S. Fox. Barrabee was named a first-team all-prep school selection at left end by The Boston Globe. According to the Globe, Barrabee "continued to improve so fast that he ranked with the best schoolboy ends in the Bay State." While in high school, he nearly drowned while trying to save a friend, Abraham Huberman, from drowning in a pond in Saugus, Massachusetts. Huberman, who was 17, died in the ordeal.

== College career ==
In 1925, Barrabee enrolled at the New York University (NYU) School of Commerce. He joined the NYU Violets football team that year as a star end on the freshman squad, being listed at 5 ft 9 1/2 in (1.77 m) and 165 lb (75 kg). Barrabee helped the team beat his former prep school, Cushing Academy, in a game that November. He took part in spring practices with the varsity squad the following April under head coach Chick Meehan, and then made the 37-man final roster.

Barrabee was the starting left end in the 1926 season opener, a 34–0 shutout win over Niagara on September 25. Early in the 1927 season, he replaced incumbent starter Mike Riordan. On October 15, Barrabee caught a pass from team captain Jack Connor and ran 45 yards for a touchdown in a 32–0 win over Fordham, with The Lincoln Daily Star writing that he "justified Meehan's confidence in him" with his performance. He caught another touchdown the following week in a 60–6 blowout win over Rutgers. On November 12, Barrabee blocked and recovered a 12-yard would-be game-winning field goal by Johnny Roepke to preserve a 12–12 tie against Penn State. In the season finale on November 24, he caught a 56-yard touchdown pass in a 27–18 loss to Nebraska. Barrabee was named a first-team Jewish All-American at right end by the Jewish Telegraphic Agency.

"Strong's success at passing against Carnegie Tech was due, in great part, to Bob Barrabee's outstanding play at end. Here is a really great end, a speed demon, and possessing a pair of hands that would be the envy of any big league infielder. Barrabee speared those heaves of Strong's out of the air Saturday like Young Griffo could nail flies." – The Standard Union after a game against Carnegie Tech in 1928

=== Later college career and legacy ===
After being hampered by injuries for two seasons, Barrabee played a key role for the Violets as a senior in 1928. He once again earned a starting spot at end ahead of the season opener, despite facing intense competition at the position. By this time, Barrabee was listed at 5 ft 10 in (178 cm) and "just over" 170 lb (77 kg). He was also described by The Yonkers Statesman as "remarkably alert and expert at snagging passes." On October 6, Barrabee recovered a blocked punt and "rolled across the line for a touchdown" in a 26–7 victory over West Virginia Wesleyan. On October 20, he caught a touchdown pass from Ken Strong in a 48–0 blowout of Rutgers, with The Brooklyn Citizen commenting that he "seem[ed] sure of his end position on the strength of his consistent work". The next week, Barrabee caught two more touchdown passes from Strong in a 47–6 rout of Colgate, one of which was, according to The Brooklyn Daily Eagle, "probably the most thrilling of its kind ever staged on the Yankee field." On November 10, he caught a 50-yard touchdown pass from Strong in a 71–0 romp of Alfred. Barrabee caught two touchdown passes from Strong in a 27–13 win over Carnegie Tech on November 24. He played his final collegiate game five days later, starting in a 25–13 defeat to Oregon State.

Barrabee led the nation in scoring among ends with seven touchdowns. He was named a second-team All-American by the International News Service and a third-team All-American by the Newspaper Enterprise Association. Barrabee also collected second-team All-Eastern accolades from both the Associated Press and the United Press, and repeated as a first-team Jewish All-American selection. He was invited to play in the East–West Shrine Game in San Francisco along with Strong. They were originally granted permission from NYU, but it was later revoked due to the pair cutting classes. According to Meehan: "Strong and Barrabee became social lions right after the season was over... Fraternities and clubs ran after them and no event was a social success unless they were present," adding that they "ruined their own parade."

Aside from football, Barrabee was a member of NYU's first ice hockey team and played in their inaugural game, a 3–0 loss to Clarkson Tech at the Brooklyn Ice Palace on January 28, 1927. He was one of five football players on the roster. Barrabee also reportedly played baseball at NYU.

Barrabee was later named to the all-time NYU football team by The Pittsburgh Press in 1935.

== Professional career ==
In December 1928, following his senior season at NYU, Barrabee spoke to The Brooklyn Daily Eagle about continuing his career: "After the last game, I was glad it was over. No more football forever. Just easy living. That was two or three weeks ago. I feel differently now. I'd like to play in another year." Despite having reservations about the increasing professionalization of the sport, he praised the play of the Frankford Yellow Jackets and the Staten Island Stapletons, saying he "hears that these are two teams that are putting up the best football exhibitions, the real hard, stiff games we play in college."

In September 1929, Barrabee was reported to have signed with the Staten Island Stapletons of the National Football League (NFL), joining Ken Strong and several other former college teammates on the team. However, he did not appear on the team's roster for the 1929 NFL season.

In September 1931, Barrabee was once again announced to have joined the Stapletons, this time ahead of the 1931 NFL season. He made his professional debut on September 20, 1931, starting in a scoreless exhibition draw against the independent Viking-Bulldogs at the second West Side Park in Jersey City, New Jersey. Barrabee started in the Stapletons' NFL season opener, a 9–7 win over the Brooklyn Dodgers on October 4. He played in 10 games for Staten Island. The team finished with a 4–6–1 record and finished seventh in the league standings.

== Later life and personal life ==
Barrabee was Jewish. In February 1929, he underwent surgery on his nose, which was injured during the previous college football season. Barrabee graduated from NYU with a Bachelor of Science degree in June 1929. He had a noticeable Boston accent.

"Bob Barrabee continued talking in that quiet, soft way of his, his words seeming almost strange from a football player. That broad, smooth pronunciation of the first letter of the alphabet was just exactly the sort one does not expect from football players. It smacked more of Beacon Hill than a gridiron." – Ralph Trost of The Brooklyn Daily Eagle

Following his graduation from NYU, Barrabee joined a "prominent rubber firm" and was subsequently sent to learn the trade at a tire establishment in Paterson, New Jersey. While there, he briefly served as the line coach at Eastside High School. Later that year, Barrabee was hired as a salesman at Firestone in North Plainfield, New Jersey, where he also served as an assistant football coach at Plainfield High School. In February 1931, the Paterson Morning Call reported that he was "learning how to raise tobacco in a place called Caguey, Cuba." The following year, Barrabee was reportedly working for the General Cigar Co. In 1933, he volunteered as an assistant football coach at Newport High School in Newport, Vermont while visiting family. According to The Caledonian-Record, "Under his skillful management the team soon struck a winning gait and defeated some of the strongest elevens in northern Vermont."

In January 1935, Barrabee married Doris Dickens Webster, whom he had met on a trip to visit his sister in Vermont. The couple went to live in New York City, where Barrabee worked as the section manager of a large laundry company. They later moved to Bradley Beach, New Jersey, before settling in Ocean Township, New Jersey, in 1938. The couple had two children: Bruce and Brian.

Barrabee operated his own business, Ever Ready Diaper Service, for 10 years. In 1949, he established the Bob Barrabee Athletic Club and Day Camp, which he administered for 20 years. Barrabee served two terms on the Ocean Township Board of Education and became chairman of the athletic committee in 1952. He also served on the Ocean Township Planning Board, becoming chairman in 1963. Barrabee taught English at Monmouth College–now known as Monmouth University–while earning his master's degree at the institution. He also taught physical education at Ranney School for 11 years, as well as ninth-grade classes at Henry Hudson Regional High School, before retiring from teaching in 1979.

Barrabee died on June 3, 1984, at a nursing home in Wall Township, New Jersey.
