= 1927 All-Eastern football team =

American all-star college football team

The 1927 All-Eastern football team consists of American football players chosen by various selectors as the best players at each position among the Eastern colleges and universities during the 1927 college football season.

Four players received first-team All-Eastern honors and were also consensus first-team All-Americans: halfback Gibby Welch of Pittsburgh; tackle Ed Hake of Penn; guard Bill Webster; and center John Charlesworth of Yale. Sprague was later inducted into the College Football Hall of Fame.

== All-Eastern selections ==
=== Quarterbacks ===
- Jack Connor, NYU (AP-1, UP-1)
- Robert B. MacPhail, Dartmouth (AP-2, UP-2)

=== Halfbacks ===
- Gibby Welch, Pittsburgh (AP-1, UP-1)
- Alton Marsters, Dartmouth (AP-1, UP-1)
- Eddie Wittmer, Princeton (AP-2, UP-2)
- Paul Scull, Penn (AP-2)
- Chris Cagle, Army (UP-2)

=== Fullbacks ===
- Bill Amos, Washington & Jefferson (AP-1, UP-1)
- Mike Miles, Princeton (AP-2)
- Frank Briante, NYU (UP-2)

=== Ends ===
- Stewart Scott, Yale (AP-1, UP-1)
- George Cole, Dartmouth (AP-1)
- Charles F. Born, Army (UP-1)
- Charles R. Moeser, Princeton (AP-2)
- Delph, Penn State (AP-2)
- Joseph Lenzer, Penn (UP-2)
- Dwight Fishwick, Yale (UP-2)

=== Tackles ===
- Bud Sprague, Army (AP-1, UP-1)
- Ed Hake, Penn (AP-1, UP-1)
- Jim Fitzgerald, Tufts (AP-2, UP-2)
- Bill Kern, Pittsburgh (AP-2)
- Sidney S. Quarrier, Yale (UP-2)

=== Guards ===
- Bill Webster, Yale (AP-1, UP-1)
- August Cervini, Holy Cross (AP-2, UP-1)
- Bruce Dumont, Colgate (AP-1)
- Woerner, Navy (AP-2)
- Miller, Amherst (UP-2)
- Edward Burke, Navy (UP-2)

=== Centers ===
- Claude Grigsby, Georgetown (AP-1, UP-2)
- John Charlesworth, Yale (AP-2, UP-1)

== Key ==
- AP = Associated Press, selected from opinions of 56 critics, sport writers, and officials in the East
- UP = United Press

== See also ==
- 1927 College Football All-America Team
