= Admiral Burke =

Admiral Burke may refer to:

- Arleigh Burke (1901–1996), U.S. Navy admiral
- Edward Burke (American football) (1907–1967), U.S. Navy rear admiral
- Robert P. Burke (born 1962), U.S. Navy admiral

== See also ==
- Burke (surname)
- Burke (disambiguation)
