= Edwin J. Messinger =

American Army general (1907–1965)

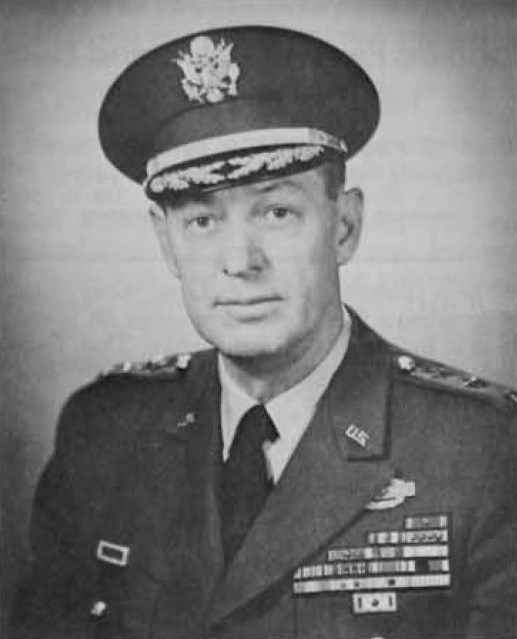
- Born: 1 March 1907; Kingston, New York
- Died: 28 January 1965 (aged 57); Washington, D.C.
- Military career
- Allegiance: United States
- Branch: United States Army
- Service years: 1931–1965
- Rank: Lieutenant General
- Commands: 25th Infantry Division; 9th Infantry, 2nd Infantry Division; 23rd Infantry, 2nd Infantry Division; Battalion, 23rd Infantry Regiment; 17th Airborne Division Artillery (Acting)
- Conflicts: World War II; Korean War
- Awards: Distinguished Service Cross (2); Silver Star Medal (2); Legion of Merit (5); Bronze Star Medal (3)

Edwin John Messinger (1 March 1907 – 28 January 1965) was a United States Army lieutenant general. During the Korean War, he was awarded the Distinguished Service Cross twice for his actions as commander of the 9th Infantry Regiment in 1951. Messinger later served as the commanding general of the 25th Infantry Division.

== Early life and education ==
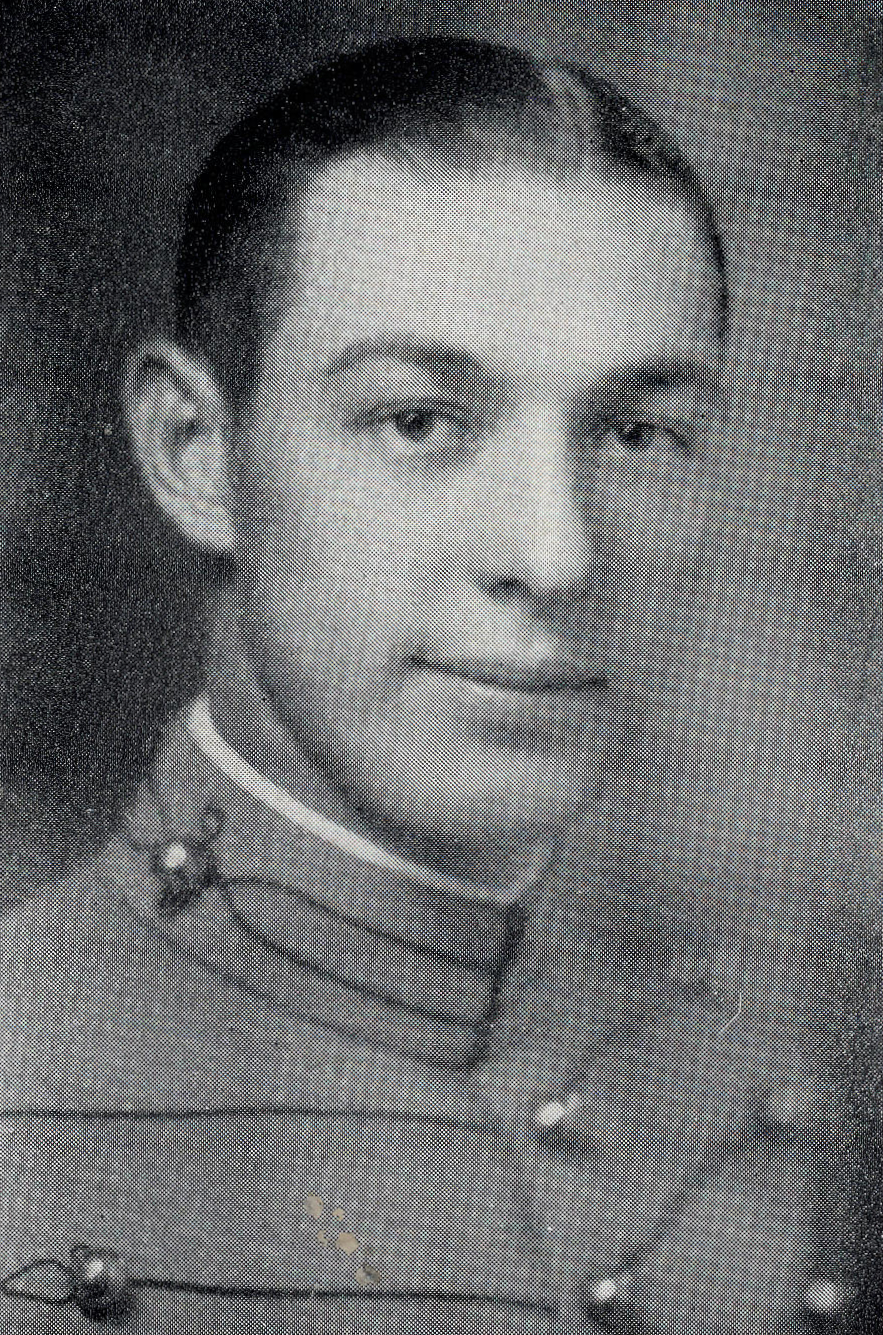
Messinger as a United States Military Academy cadet c. 1931

Born and raised in Kingston, New York, Messinger graduated from Kingston High School. He entered the United States Military Academy in July 1927, where he played end on the football team. Messinger was selected All-American in 1928 and All-Eastern in 1928 and 1930. After graduating on 11 June 1931, he was commissioned in the infantry. Messinger graduated from the Infantry School Regular Course in June 1936, the Command and General Staff School in March 1943, the Armed Forces Staff College in July 1949 and the National War College in 1952. He also studied Latin American affairs at the University of Michigan Post Hostilities School from November 1945 to May 1946.

== Military career ==
Messinger served with the 28th Infantry at Fort Niagara, New York from September 1931 to August 1935. He next served with the 15th Infantry in Tianjin, China from November 1936 to March 1938. Messinger then traveled with his regiment to Fort Lewis, Washington, serving there until May 1939.

Messinger returned to West Point to teach physical education and serve as Assistant Master of the Sword from May 1939 to November 1942. He received a temporary promotion to captain in September 1940, permanent promotion to captain in June 1941, temporary promotion to major in February 1942 and temporary promotion to lieutenant colonel in October 1942.

After leaving West Point, Messinger joined the 17th Airborne Division at Camp Mackall, North Carolina as assistant chief of staff for operations G-3. He traveled with the division to England and then into combat in Central Europe. In March 1945, Messinger received a temporary promotion to colonel and led troops across the Rhine River to help capture Essen, Germany. In May 1945, he briefly served as the division artillery commander. Messinger was awarded the Silver Star Medal, Legion of Merit and two Bronze Star Medals for his World War II service.

After the war, Messinger served as chief of the U.S. Military Mission in San José, Costa Rica from June 1946 to December 1948. His temporary rank was reduced to lieutenant colonel in July 1947 and made permanent in July 1948. In August 1949, Messinger joined the 23rd Infantry, 2nd Infantry Division at Fort Lewis, Washington as a battalion commander and then executive officer.

After his regiment was sent to Korea in 1950, Messinger became its commanding officer. He received a second temporary promotion to colonel in September 1950. After leading combat operations, Messinger was transferred to the 9th Infantry as its commander. In 1951, the regiment participated in Operation Killer and the Battle of the Soyang River. Messinger was subsequently awarded the Distinguished Service Cross twice for his actions during each of these engagements. He also earned a second Silver Star, two more awards of the Legion of Merit and a third Bronze Star for his Korean War service.

In April 1953, Messinger received a temporary promotion to brigadier general. He subsequently served as assistant commander of the 24th Infantry Division in South Korea. His permanent rank was increased to colonel in August 1953. From 1954 to 1956, Messinger served as commandant of cadets at the Military Academy. From 1956 to 1957, he served as commanding general of the 25th Infantry Division at Schofield Barracks, Hawaii. His temporary promotion to major general was approved in May 1956. From 1957 to 1959, Messinger served in the office of the Commander in Chief, Army in the Pacific as deputy chief of staff for foreign military and civil affairs, logistics and administration. His permanent rank was increased to brigadier general in January 1958.

From 1959 to 1961, Messinger served in the office of the Joint Chiefs of Staff as director of military assistance affairs. His permanent rank was increased to major general in June 1960. From 1961 to 1963, he was chief of the Joint U.S. Military Mission for Military Affairs in Turkey. From 1963 to 1964, Messinger briefly served as assistant deputy chief of staff for logistics at the Department of the Army.

In April 1964, Messinger received a temporary promotion to lieutenant general and became deputy commanding general of the Continental Army Command at Fort Monroe, Virginia. While serving in this post, he died at the Walter Reed General Hospital on 28 January 1965. Messinger was buried at West Point Cemetery two days later.

== Personal ==
Messinger was the son of Jacob L. Messinger and Caroline K. (Rundel) Messinger.

On 13 June 1931 at First Lutheran Church, Paterson, New Jersey, Messinger married Emily C. Nelson (11 July 1907 – 1 January 1976). They had two daughters and a son.
