= Ed Hake =

American football player (1904–1978)

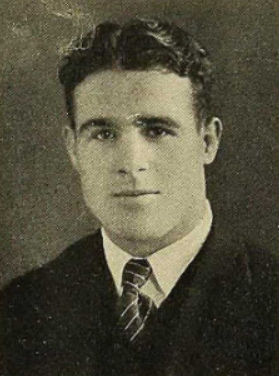

Profile
- Position: Tackle

Personal information
- Born: April 7, 1904; Michigan, U.S.
- Died: September 12, 1978 (aged 74); Perkiomenville, Pennsylvania, U.S.
- Listed height: 6 ft 0 in (1.83 m)
- Listed weight: 190 lb (86 kg)

Career information
- High school: West Catholic Prep (Philadelphia, Pennsylvania)
- College: Penn Quakers (1926–1927)

Awards and highlights
- Consensus All-American (1927); First-team All-Eastern (1927)

Edward William Hake (April 7, 1904 – September 12, 1978) was an American college football player.

Hake was born in Michigan in 1904. He attended West Catholic Preparatory High School in Philadelphia. He was a star tackle on West Catholic's football team.

Hake attended the University of Pennsylvania where he played football for the Penn Quakers football teams in 1926 and 1927. He was a consensus selection at the tackle position on the 1927 All-America team. He was also elected as the captain of the 1927 Penn Quakers football team. At the conclusion of the 1927 season, Penn head coach Lou Young said of Hake:

His courage, aggressiveness and determination to lead his fellow players to victory, made him stand out as one of the greatest football players that ever attired himself in a football uniform of the University of Pennsylvania. His excellent tackling and defensive work . . . paved the way for Pennsylvania to emerge victorious . . ."

Hake also competed in wrestling and boxing at Penn.

In 1940, Hake was employed as an insurance broker and was living in Philadelphia with his wife, Celeste, their daughter, Nedine, and their son, Tucker. He died of a heart attack, on September 12, 1978, in Perkiomenville, Pennsylvania, at the age of 74.
