= 1928 All-Eastern football team =

American all-star college football team

The 1928 All-Eastern football team consists of American football players chosen by various selectors as the best players at each position among the Eastern colleges and universities during the 1928 college football season.

== All-Eastern selections ==
=== Quarterbacks ===
- Howard Harpster, Carnegie Tech (AP-1)

=== Halfbacks ===
- Chris Cagle, Army (AP-1)
- Ken Strong, NYU (AP-1)

=== Fullbacks ===
- Paul Scull, Penn (AP-1)

=== Ends ===
- Theodore Rosenzweig, Carnegie Tech (AP-1)
- Edwin Messinger, Army (AP-1)

=== Tackles ===
- Bud Sprague, Army (AP-1)
- Afred "Al" Lassman, NYU (AP-1)

=== Guards ===
- Edward Burke, Navy (AP-1)
- Bruce Dumont, Colgate (AP-1)

=== Centers ===
- Charles Howe, Princeton (AP-1)

== Key ==
- AP = Associated Press

== See also ==
- 1928 College Football All-America Team
