= 1928 All-Pacific Coast football team =

American all-star college football team

The 1928 All-Pacific Coast football team consists of American football players chosen by various organizations for All-Pacific Coast teams for the 1928 college football season. The organizations selecting teams in 1934 included the Associated Press (AP), the Newspaper Enterprise Association, and the United Press (UP).

== All-Pacific Coast selections ==
=== Quarterback ===
- Don Williams, USC (NEA-1; UP-1)
- Howard Maple, Oregon State (AP-1)

=== Halfbacks ===
- Benny Lom, California (AP-1; NEA-1; UP-1)
- Chuck Carroll, Washington (AP-1; NEA-1; UP-1 [fullback]) (College Football Hall of Fame)

=== Fullback ===
- Lloyd Thomas, USC (AP-1; NEA-1; UP-1 [halfback])

=== Ends ===
- Irvine Phillips, California (AP-1; NEA-1; UP-1)
- Malcolm Franklan, St. Mary's (AP-1; UP-1)
- Lawrence McCaslin, USC (NEA-1)

=== Tackles ===
- Steve Bancroft, California (AP-1; NEA-1; UP-1)
- Mel Dressel, Washington State (AP-1; NEA-1; UP-1)

=== Guards ===
- Don Robesky, Stanford (AP-1; NEA-1; UP-1)
- Seraphim Post, Stanford (AP-1; NEA-1; UP-1)

=== Centers ===
- George Stadelman, Oregon (NEA-1; UP-1)
- Nate Barragar, USC (AP-1)

== Key ==
AP = Associated Press

NEA = Newspaper Enterprise Association

UP = United Press

Bold = Consensus first-team selection by at least two of the AP, NEA and UP

== See also ==
- 1928 College Football All-America Team
