= Howard Maple =

American football and baseball player (1903–1970)

- Maple with the Washington Senators, c. 1932
- Catcher
- Born: July 20, 1903; Adrian, Missouri, U.S.
- Died: November 9, 1970 (aged 67); Portland, Oregon, U.S.
- Batted: Left Threw: Right

MLB debut
- May 19, 1932, for the Washington Senators

Last MLB appearance
- September 18, 1932, for the Washington Senators

MLB statistics
- Batting average: .244
- RBI: 7
- Home runs: 0
- Stats at Baseball Reference

Teams
- Washington Senators (1932)

Howard Albert Maple (July 20, 1903 – November 9, 1970) was an American professional athlete. He played football for the Chicago Cardinals of the National Football League (NFL) in 1930 and baseball for the Washington Senators of Major League Baseball (MLB) in 1932. He was a college athlete at then-Oregon State Agricultural College.

== Biography ==
Maple played college football and college baseball for the Oregon State Aggies (now the Oregon State Beavers). As a quarterback, he led the team to an overall 16–7–1 record for the seasons of 1926 through 1928, and was named a 1928 All-American. Maple is the university's only alumnus to play in both the NFL and MLB. He was inducted to the Oregon Sports Hall of Fame in 1981, and the athletics hall of fame at Oregon State University in 1990.

In 1930, Maple played in eight games for the Chicago Cardinals of the NFL. The NFL's website lists him as a wingback.

Maple played in minor league baseball from 1930 through 1935, appearing in over 400 minor league games. Listed at 5 feet 7 inches (1.70 m) and 175 pounds (79 kg), he batted left-handed and threw right-handed. Maple appeared 44 major league games, all with the 1932 Washington Senators. He posted a .244 batting average (10-for-41) with seven RBIs. His best offensive game came on August 31, when he went 3-for-4 with an RBI and a run scored against pitcher Sam Gray, as the Senators defeated the St. Louis Browns, 7–6. Maple appeared in 41 games defensively, all as a catcher, handling 39 total chances without an error for a 1.000 fielding percentage.

Maple was born in 1903 in Adrian, Missouri, and graduated from Peoria High School in Illinois. He coached basketball, football, and baseball at Willamette University from the early 1930s through 1941. During World War II, he served in the United States Army. He worked in several jobs after the war, and went on to manage the Oregon State Fair from 1957 to 1967. He was married, and had one daughter and a foster son. Maple died in 1970 in Portland, Oregon, and is interred in Salem, Oregon.

== See also ==
- 1928 All-Pacific Coast football team
- List of athletes who played in Major League Baseball and the National Football League
