= 1927 All-Pacific Coast football team =

American all-star college football team

The 1927 All-Pacific Coast football team consists of American football players chosen by various organizations for All-Pacific Coast teams for the 1927 college football season. The organizations selecting teams in 1934 included the Associated Press (AP) and the United Press (UP).

== All-Pacific Coast selections ==
=== Quarterback ===
- Morley Drury, USC (AP-1; UP-1)

=== Halfbacks ===
- Richard Hyland, Stanford (AP-1; UP-1)
- Chuck Carroll, Washington (AP-1; UP-1)

=== Fullback ===
- Biff Hoffman, Stanford (AP-1; UP-1)

=== Ends ===
- Irvine Phillips, California (AP-1; UP-1)
- Leroy Schuh, Washington (AP-1)
- John Preston, Stanford (UP-1)

=== Tackles ===
- Fritz Coltrin, California (AP-1; UP-1)
- Jesse Hibbs, USC (AP-1; UP-1)

=== Guards ===
- William Wright, Washington (AP-1; UP-1)
- Seraphim Post, Stanford (AP-1)
- Vernon Eilers, Oregon Aggies (UP-1)

=== Centers ===
- Larry Bettencourt, St. Mary's (AP-1) (College Football Hall of Fame)
- John H. "Hal" McCreery, Stanford (UP-1)

== Key ==
AP = Associated Press

UP = United Press

Bold = Consensus first-team selection by the AP and UP

== See also ==
- 1927 College Football All-America Team
