= Irvine Phillips =

American football player (1905–1999)

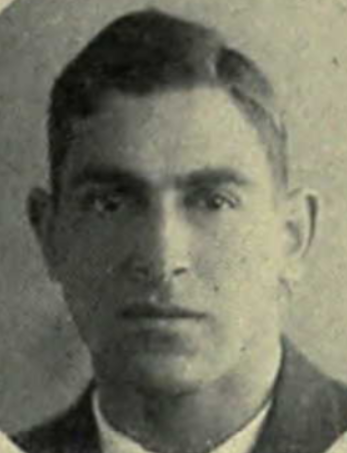
- Phillips from "The Blue and Gold" (1929)

California Golden Bears
- Position: End

Personal information
- Born: June 10, 1905
- Died: April 4, 1999 (aged 93)

Career information
- College: California (1926–1928)

Awards and highlights
- Consensus All-American (1928); Third-team All-American (1927); 2× First-team All-PCC (1927, 1928)

Irvine Lewis Phillips Sr. (June 10, 1905 – April 4, 1999) was an American football player. He played college football at University of California, Berkeley and was a consensus selection at the end position on the 1928 College Football All-America Team.

Phillips was raised in Salinas, California. He enrolled at the University of California in the Class of 1929. While at Berkeley, Phillips was a member of Sigma Alpha Epsilon, Skull and Keys, Theta Tau, Winged Helmet, Beta Beta, the Big "C" Society, the Athletic Council, the Vigilance Committee, and the Senior Peace Committee. He was also a member of the football and track teams, receiving three varsity letters in each sport and serving as captain of the football team in his senior year. After the 1927 season, Phillips was selected as a second-team All-American by the Central Press Association, and a third-string All-American by the Associated Press. Following his senior year, he was also selected as a consensus first-team All-American\.

After graduating from Berkeley, Phillips was married and lived in Pajaro, California, with his wife Marion. In 1930, he was employed as a farm superintendent. Irvine and his wife had four children: Irvine L., Jr. (born c. 1932), Sara (born c. 1935), Marion Adeline (born c. 1937) and Delphine (born 1939). By 1940, Phillips and his family had moved to Long Beach, California, where Phillips was employed as a public school teacher.

Phillips lived in Carmel, California, in his later years. He died in 1999, aged 93.
