= Bill Webster (American football) =

American football player (1903–1981)

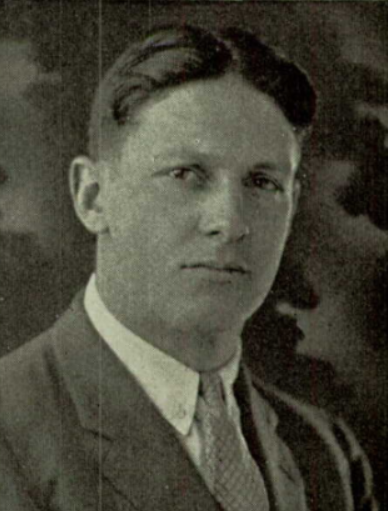
- Webster from 1924 Hotchkiss yearbook

Yale Bulldogs
- Positions: Guard, tackle

Personal information
- Born: July 28, 1903; Fairfield County, Connecticut, U.S.
- Died: May 1981 (aged 77); Tucson, Arizona, U.S.
- Listed height: 6 ft 0 in (1.83 m)
- Listed weight: 200 lb (91 kg)

Career information
- High school: Shelton High School; Hotchkiss School
- College: Yale Bulldogs (1925–1927)

Awards and highlights
- National champion (1927); Consensus All-American (1927); First-team All-Eastern (1927)

William Adam Hall Webster (July 28, 1903 – May 1981) was an American college football player. He played at Yale University and was a consensus first-team All-American at the guard position in 1927.

Webster was raised in Fairfield County, Connecticut, and attended Shelton High School and preparatory school at the Hotchkiss School in Lakeville, Connecticut. As a senior at the Hotchkiss School during the 1923-24 school year, he was captain of the football team and a member of the Olympian gym team, dramatic association, class hockey team, debating union, St. Luke's board, track team and baseball team.

Webster next enrolled at Yale University. He played for the Yale Bulldogs football team from 1925 to 1927 at the guard and tackle positions. During the 1925 season, he was injured and saw only limited action as a substitute at the tackle position. In September 1926, he again suffered an injury that limited his time with the team. He returned to the team in mid-October 1926 and played at the right tackle position. As a senior, Webster was captain of the 1927 Yale football team that compiled a 7–1 record and was recognized as the national champion by the College Football Researchers Association. Despite a further injury in November 1927, Webster became a consensus first-team selection at the guard position on the 1927 College Football All-America Team. In 1928, he became an assistant coach to the Yale football team.

After graduating from Yale, Webster was employed by the firm of Guggenheim Brothers in New York. He was married in September 1931 to Frances Mary Gamble.
