= Chuck Carroll =

American football player and attorney (1906–2003)

King County Prosecuting Attorney
- In office January 1, 1949 – January 3, 1971
- Preceded by: Lloyd W. Shorett
- Succeeded by: Chris Bayley

Personal details
- Born: Charles Oliver Carroll; August 13, 1906 Seattle, Washington, U.S.
- Died: June 23, 2003 (aged 96) Seattle, Washington, U.S.
- Football career

Washington Huskies
- Position: Halfback

Career information
- High school: Garfield High School
- College: Washington (1927–1928)

Awards and highlights
- Consensus All-American (1928); Third-team All-American (1927); 2× Consensus All-Pacific-Coast (1927, 1928); Washington Huskies No. 2 retired
- College Football Hall of Fame

Charles Oliver Carroll (August 13, 1906 – June 23, 2003) was an American football player and attorney in the state of Washington. He was the King County Prosecuting Attorney between 1949 and 1971.

== Early life ==
Carroll was born on August 13, 1906, in Seattle, Washington. He was one of five children of Thomas J. Carroll, who founded Carroll's Fine Jewelry, and Maude Carroll. He attended Madrona Grammar School. He graduated from Garfield High School in 1925, where he was editor of the school newspaper and played football under coach Leon Brigham, earning 16 varsity letters. He later married Alyce Grangaard and the couple had two children: Chuck Jr. and Kathleen.

=== Football career ===
He attended the University of Washington (UW), where he was a running back and linebacker for the Washington Huskies football team, at a time when teams had to play both offensive and defensive positions. He was coached by Enoch Bagshaw, who had led the school to its first two appearances at the Rose Bowl in 1924 and 1926. In his junior year, he scored fifteen touchdowns and in a game on October 22, 1927 against the school's rival, Washington State University, he scored two touchdowns while rushing for 136 yards.

During Carroll's senior year, he had six touchdowns against the College of Puget Sound, scoring 36 points, a UW record for points in a game by a single player. In 1928, he scored a total of 17 touchdowns, which was the school record until it was beaten by Corey Dillon in 1996. At a game against the Stanford University Cardinals on November 17, 1928, the Huskies lost by 0–12 but Carroll was carried off the field on the shoulders of the Stanford players, urged by President-elect Herbert Hoover. Stanford's coach, Pop Warner, said he had never seen "a greater football player." Following the game, Warner named Carroll to his All-America first team. He was also named to eleven other All-America teams in 1928, including the Associated Press, United Press, Saturday Evening Post and the All-America Board.

Carroll was the leading scorer in his junior and senior years for the Pacific Coast Conference. He played for all but six minutes of his three-year collegiate career, being nicknamed the "Iron Man". He received the Flaherty Medal for most inspirational player in his senior year. His jersey, no. 2, is one of only three numbers retired by the UW football program, along with the jerseys of George Wilson and Roland Kirkby. Former UW wide receivers Aaron Williams, Kasen Williams and Aaron Fuller were allowed to wear the retired jersey. Carroll would go on to earn a place in the College Football Hall of Fame in 1964, the National Football Foundation Hall of Fame in 1964, and was the first inductee to the University of Washington Husky Football Hall of Fame in 1979. He was selected by his high school in 1950 as its Athlete of the First Half Century, was inducted into the Helms Athletic Foundation's hall of fame in 1958 and was selected for the UW's All-Time Team in 1950 as a first-teamer.

== Legal career ==
After graduation, Carroll chose not to play professional football. He attended the University of Washington School of Law, graduating in 1932. He then became a private practice attorney in Seattle. He was in the Judge Advocate General's Corps for the U.S. Army during World War II where he was stationed in the Presidio in San Francisco, California. He reached rank of colonel during his five years in the service. In 1948, he was appointed as the King County Prosecuting Attorney by three members of the county commission. He immediately announced that he would investigate rumors of illegal gambling. He held the position for 22 years. In 1957, he prosecuted powerful Teamster leader Dave Beck for grand larceny.

He was powerful in Republican politics, gaining the power to approve all political appointees. He lost re-election to be the prosecuting attorney in 1970, losing in a close Republican primary to Christopher Bayley. Following his loss, he was indicted for failing to prosecute police corruption, when Seattle police officers were accused of accepting bribes from tavern owners in exchange for not investigating illegal gambling. The indictment was ultimately dismissed by Judge W. R. Cole. He rejoined private practice until his retirement in 1985.

== Death and legacy ==
He died on June 23, 2003, at Swedish Hospital in Seattle at the age of 96.

== See also ==
- Washington Huskies football statistical leaders

Legal offices
Preceded by Lloyd W. Shorett	King County Prosecuting Attorney; 1949–1971	Succeeded by Chris Bayley
