= Seraphim Post =

American football player (1904–1975)

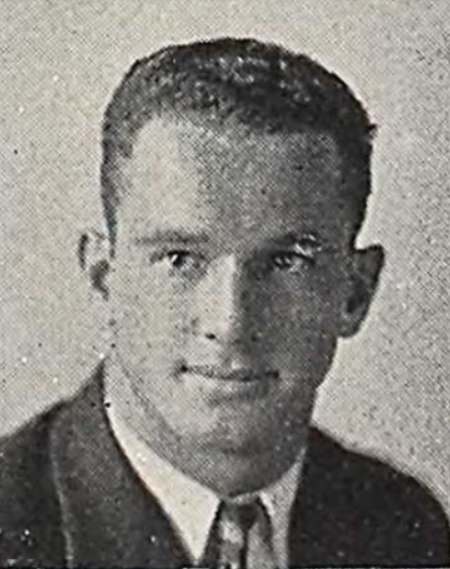
- Post from "The Stanford Quad" (1929)

Profile
- Position: Guard

Personal information
- Born: August 1, 1904
- Died: August 13, 1975 (aged 71); Stanford, California, U.S.

Career information
- College: Stanford (1927–1929)

Awards and highlights
- Consensus All-American (1928); 2× First-team All-PCC (1927, 1928)

Seraphim Fred "Dynamite" Post (August 1, 1904 – August 13, 1975) was an American college football guard who played at Stanford University. He was a consensus All-American in 1928.

== Early life ==
Seraphim Fred Post was born on August 1, 1904. He was a consensus All-American in 1928. Stanford guard Don Robesky was also a consensus All-American in 1928. Post's Stanford profile states that "Seraphim “Dynamite” Post teamed with Don Robesky to form college football’s most dominating pair of offensive guards." Post was a member of Stanford's 1927 Rose Bowl team. He also earned Associated Press first-team All-PCC honors in both 1927 and 1928. He was later inducted into the Stanford Athletics Hall of Fame.

== Later life ==
Post was an administrator at Stanford until retiring in 1969. He lived in Menlo Park, California. He died on August 13, 1975, at Stanford Medical Center following a surgery.
