= Don Robesky =

American football player (1906–2002)

Profile
- Position: Guard

Personal information
- Born: May 15, 1906; Iowa, U.S.
- Died: February 25, 2002 (aged 95); Bakersfield, California, U.S.

Career information
- High school: Bakersfield (CA) Kern Union
- College: Stanford (1926–1928)

Awards and highlights
- National champion (1926); Consensus All-American (1928); First-team All-PCC (1928)

Donald A. Robesky (May 15, 1906 – February 25, 2002) was an American college football guard who played at Stanford University. He was a consensus All-American in 1928.

== Early life ==
Donald A. Robesky was born on May 15, 1906, in Iowa. He attended Kern County Union High School in Bakersfield, California. He was a tackle on two state title-winning teams in high school.

Robesky was a three-year letterman at Stanford from 1926 to 1928 and a consensus All-American in 1928 along with Stanford line-mate Seraphim Post. He earned Associated Press first-team All-PCC honors in 1928.

Robesky as a Stanford sophomore in 1926.

Robesky played in the 1927 and 1928 Rose Bowls.

== Post-playing career ==
Robesky was the line coach at Bakersfield College from 1934 to 1942 before serving in the United States Navy from 1943 to 1945, earning the rank of Lieutenant commander. He was later the Chairman of the Social Studies Department at Bakersfield High School.

He was elected to the Stanford Athletics Hall of Fame in 1958 and the Bob Elias Kern County Hall of Fame on February 16, 1967.

He died on February 25, 2002, in Bakersfield.
