= Nate Barragar =

American football player (1907–1985)

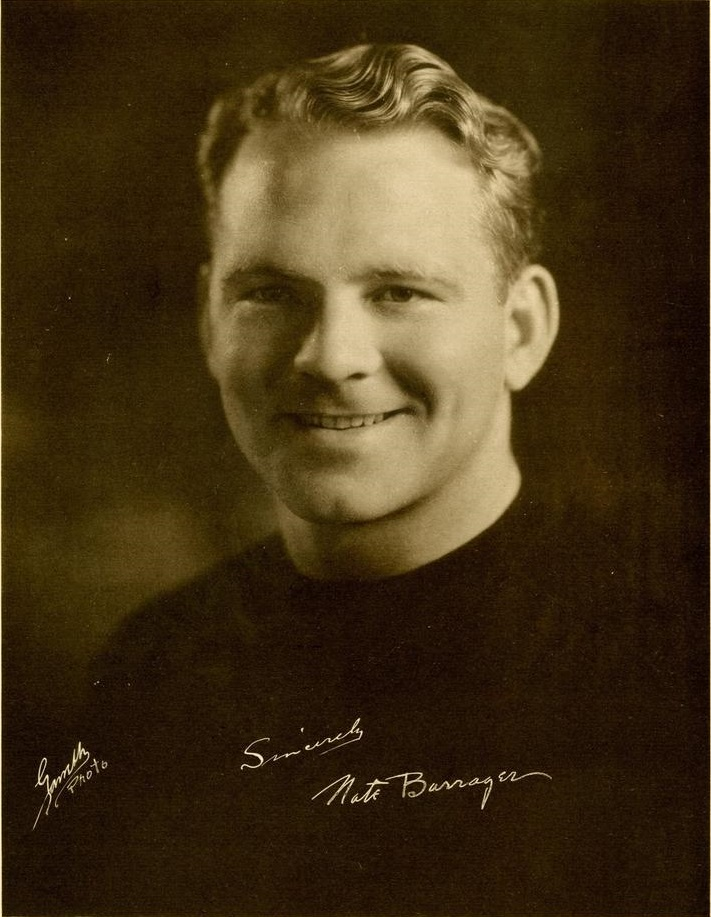

Profile
- Position: C

Personal information
- Born: June 3, 1907; Dearing, Kansas, U.S.
- Died: August 10, 1985 (aged 78); Santa Monica, California, U.S.
- Listed height: 6 ft 0 in (1.83 m)
- Listed weight: 212 lb (96 kg)

Career information
- College: USC

Career history
- Minneapolis Red Jackets (1930); Frankford Yellow Jackets (1930–1931); Green Bay Packers (1931–1935)

Awards and highlights
- 2× Second-team All-American (1928, 1929); 2× First-team All-PCC (1928, 1929)
- Stats at Pro Football Reference

Nathan Robert Barragar (June 3, 1907 – August 10, 1985) was an American collegiate and professional football player.

== Biography ==
Barragar was the only son of Nathaniel Hawthorne Barragar (1872–1943), a clergyman, and Olive Jan (Littleton) Barragar (1875–1955). The family moved to Yakima, Washington, then eventually settled in Los Angeles. Nathan played high school football in San Fernando.

== Football career ==
Barragar was an All-American at USC (1929), where he played as an offensive lineman. While at USC he was a member of Phi Sigma Kappa fraternity.

He was an All-Pro for the Green Bay Packers (1931–1932, 1934–1935), he also played for the Minneapolis Red Jackets (1930), and the Frankford Yellow Jackets (1930, 1931). Inducted into the USC Athletic Hall of Fame in 2003, and the Green Bay Packers Hall of Fame in 1979.

== Military service ==
Barragar served in the United States Army during World War II, attaining the rank of Sergeant.

== Motion picture and television career ==
He began working in films while playing pro football. His credits as a motion picture and television director, production manager, and producer include Gunga Din, Hondo, and Sands of Iwo Jima, and on such television series as The Gene Autry Show, The Roy Rogers Show, Adventures of Superman, Have Gun – Will Travel, Gunsmoke, and Julia.

== Personal life ==
On 29 November 1935, Barragar married Seattle socialite Jeanette Edris, who left him less than three months later. She married her fourth husband, Winthrop Rockefeller, in 1956. He remained married to his second wife, Dorothea Earle, until his death.
