= Gibby Welch =

American football player (1904–1984)

- Welch in 1927

No. 16, 3
- Position: Halfback

Personal information
- Born: December 24, 1904; Parkersburg, West Virginia, U.S.
- Died: February 10, 1984 (aged 79); Pittsburgh, Pennsylvania, U.S.
- Listed height: 5 ft 11 in (1.80 m)
- Listed weight: 178 lb (81 kg)

Career information
- College: Pittsburgh

Career history
- New York Yankees (1928); Providence Steam Roller (1929)

Awards and highlights
- Unanimous All-American (1927); First-team All-Eastern (1927)

Career statistics
- Games played: 25
- Starts: 22
- Touchdowns: 14; Other stats incomplete
- Stats at Pro Football Reference

Gilbert Laverne "Gibby" Welch (December 24, 1904 – February 10, 1984) was an American football player who played college football for the University of Pittsburgh. He broke Red Grange's single-season yardage record in 1926 and was an All-American in 1927. He later played professionally in the National Football League (NFL) for the New York Yankees in 1928 and the Providence Steam Roller in 1929.

== Biography ==
=== Early life ===
Welch was born in Parkersburg, West Virginia, and attended Parkersburg High School, where he was successful in football, basketball and track. Welch next attended Bellefont Academy, before enrolling at the University of Pittsburgh in 1924. He played three seasons of football at Pitt from 1925–1927, including the first game ever played at Pitt Stadium. Welch also ran track for Pitt in 1926, 1927 and 1928. He was one of the country's leading college discus throwers, and also competed in the shot put, javelin and broad jump.

Welch played left halfback in the single-wing offense run by coach Jock Sutherland in 1926 and 1927.

"We used the single-wing attack and the ball was usually snapped back to me — the tailback — or the fulllback," Welch later recalled. "The quarterback was a blocker more than anything else. I called signals in my junior and senior seasons. We had an unbalanced line, with two tackles on the right or left, depending on which way we were running. You'd have the guard and the center on the weak side."

In 1926, Welch broke the single-season yardage record set by Red Grange, gaining 1,964 yards in just nine games. Welch was described as "one of the most dazzling open field sprinters in the collegiate ranks," an athlete whose "sensational runs are aided by his excellent use of twirls and pivots through an open field."

=== 1927 season ===
Welch was the captain of the football and track teams as a senior. He was unanimously selected as an All-American at the halfback position in 1927 by, among others, the Associated Press, United Press, Collier's Weekly, Central Press Association, Hearst newspapers, New York Sun, Billy Evans, and the Walter Camp Football Foundation.

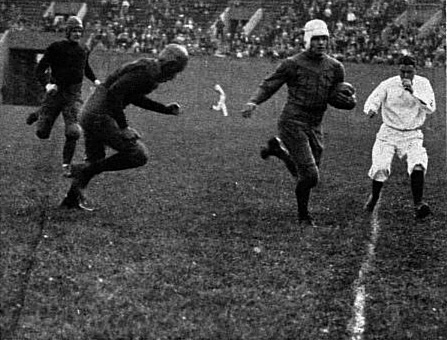
Welch (with ball) tied a Pittsburgh school record with this 105-yard kickoff return against West Virginia in 1927. Pitt won the game 40–0.

Highlights of Welch's 1927 All-American season include the following:

- In a 21-13 win over Nebraska, Welch took the opening kickoff and ran 84 yards for a touchdown. In the second quarter of the same game, Welch caught a long forward pass and then "twisted and squirmed his way 71 yards down the field for another score."
- Welch also had a 105-yard kickoff return for a touchdown against West Virginia in 1927. His 105-yard return was the longest run of the year in college football.
- In late November 1927, Welch had another big game in a 30-0 win over Penn State. One newspaper writer noted that Welch "ripped the Penn State line to shreds, bent the Lion ends almost double with his wide sweeping runs, and kicked and passed in almost uncanny form when necessary."
- Welch also led Pitt to their first bowl game, the 1928 Rose Bowl game against Stanford. In a 7-6 Stanford win, Welch was held to 50 yards, as one reporter noted: "Gibby Welch, Pitt's All-American halfback, was a tower of strength for his alma mater, but Stanford had been coached to watch the stocky halfback who made eastern grid circles buzz this season."

=== Professional football ===
Welch also played professional football for the New York Yankees in 1928 and the Providence Steam Roller in 1929. Welch earned the princely sum of $300 per game with the Yankees — near the top of the wage scale for the era — although team finances were shaky. "They still owe me $700," he later joked. Nearlhy as important to Welch as the paycheck were the perks that came through his Yankees football uniform — he was able to meet Babe Ruth, Lou Gehrig, and other heroes of the baseball Yankees during his season in Gotham.

He signed with the Steam Roller after the Yankees disbanded. A newspaper story announcing his signing by the Steam Roller noted:

"'Gibby', who was once known to have been addressed as Gilbert, functions effectively as a punter, pass dispatcher or receiver, line perforator and broken field runner. It is understood that the Roller management was forced to quote the highest figures ever whispered into a pro football player's ears before Welch affixed his signature to a contract. 'Gibby' was thrown on the open market by the recent dissolution of the New York Yankees."

=== Later life ===
After leaving professional football, Welch worked as a football coach at Morris Harvey College in 1931. He later became a leading real estate man and businessman in Parkersburg, West Virginia.

In 1948, Welch gained attention when he was charged with felonious assault with intent to kill with a deadly weapon. Welch was charged with beating his third wife, Gladys Welch, after two months of marriage in November 1948.

=== Death and legacy ===
Welch made his home during his final years in the Beechview neighborhood of southwestern Pittsburgh. He died February 10, 1984, at St. Francis General Hospital in Pittsburgh. He was 79 years old at the time of his death.

In 1956, the Charleston Daily Mail called Welch "one of the most fabulous characters ever produced in West Virginia athletics." Welch's career total of 4,108 total yards remained a school record at Pitt for more than half a century, until it was finally broken by Tony Dorsett in 1976.

== Head coaching record ==
Year	Team	Overall	Conference	Standing	Bowl/playoffs
Morris Harvey Golden Eagles (West Virginia Athletic Conference) (1931)
1931	Morris Harvey	5–5	4–5	3rd	
Morris Harvey:		5–5	4–5		
Total:		5–5			
