= Jesse Hibbs =

American film director

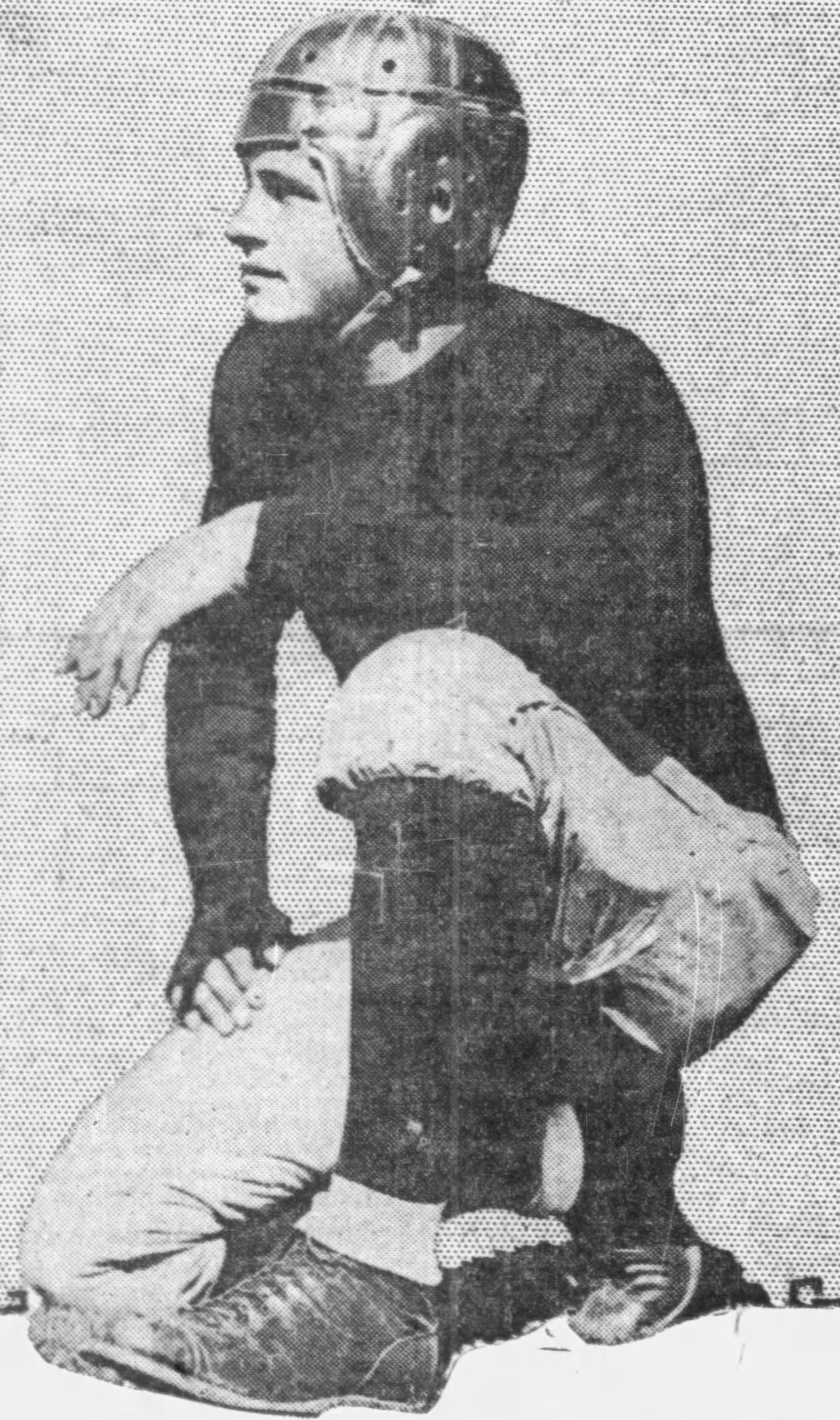
- Hibbs in 1928

Profile
- Position: Tackle

Personal information
- Born: January 11, 1906; Normal, Illinois, U.S.
- Died: February 4, 1985 (aged 79); Ojai, California, U.S.
- Listed height: 6 ft 0 in (1.83 m)
- Listed weight: 195 lb (88 kg)

Career information
- High school: Lake Forest (IL)
- College: USC

Career history
- Chicago Bears (1931)

Awards and highlights
- Consensus All-American (1927); First-team All-American (1928); 2× First-team All-PCC (1926, 1927)
- Stats at Pro Football Reference

Jesse John Hibbs (January 11, 1906 – February 4, 1985) was an American film and television director and football player. He played college football for the USC Trojans, earning consensus All-American honors as a tackle in 1927 and 1928.

== Football career ==
Born in Normal, Illinois, Hibbs graduated from the select Lake Forest Academy and subsequently enrolled at the University of Southern California (USC), where he was the captain of USC's first national championship team, in 1928. Among his 1926 teammates was Marion Morrison, later known as John Wayne.

Hibbs played professionally in the National Football League (NFL) with the Chicago Bears in 1931.

== Hollywood ==
Like several other USC players of the 1920s and 1930s, including Wayne, Ward Bond, Cotton Warburton and Aaron Rosenberg, Hibbs entered the film industry and became an assistant director. He got his first opportunity to direct in 1953, on the Tony Curtis football drama The All American. He went on to work primarily in westerns; seven of his eleven features were within the genre, along with much of his television work. He also worked regularly with Audie Murphy – on the westerns Ride Clear of Diablo, Walk the Proud Land, and Ride a Crooked Trail, as well as the film version of Murphy's life story To Hell and Back, the boxing film World in My Corner, Shining Victory, and Joe Butterfly.

In later years Hibbs worked mainly in television, directing 43 episodes of Perry Mason, 28 episodes of The F.B.I., 20 episodes of Gunsmoke as well as multiple episodes of several other TV series.

== Death and honors ==
Hibbs died at age 79 in Ojai, California. He was inducted into the USC Athletic Hall of Fame in 1999.
