= Eunice Katherine M. Ernst =

American nurse midwife (1926–2021)

Eunice Katherine Macdonald "Kitty" Ernst (July 21, 1926 – December 28, 2021) was an American nurse midwife and leader in the nurse-midwife movement in the United States.

== Biography ==
Kitty Ernst was born in Waltham, Massachusetts, on July 21, 1926, to John D. and Esther C. Macdonald.

Ernst earned her bachelor's degree in education from Hunter College in 1957, and her master's degree in public health from Columbia University in 1959. She was also awarded an honorary Doctor of Science from Case Western Reserve University.

Ernst began working as a nurse-midwife at the Frontier Nursing Service in rural Kentucky in 1951. Her next job was at the Maternity Center Association where she worked as a nurse-midwife and trained health workers to be midwives. Later, she was employed on the Columbia University Faculty of Medicine then went on to be self-employed. On her own, she educated parents, did lectures, and consulting. After she started her own family, and was a field consultant, she "developed family-centered maternity care provided by an obstetrician nurse-midwife team at the Salvation Army Booth Maternity Center in Philadelphia." She was the president of American College of Nurse-Midwives (ACNM) from 1961 to 1963 and again from 2007 to 2008.

She received the 1981 Martha Mae Eliot Award, presented by the Maternal and Child Health Section of the American Public Health Association. “The Martha May Eliot Award, established in 1964, honors unusual and exceptional achievement in the field of maternal and child health.” Along with the Martha Mae Elliot Award, she received the Hatti Hemschemeyer Award from the American College of Nurse-Midwives and the Maternity Center Medal for Distinguished Service. Ernst helped to establish delivery systems, alternative birthing centers, and nurse-midwifery services where none previously existed. She expanded the nurse-midwife field, and by the end of the 1970s, a total of 21 basic nurse-midwifery educational programs had been established.

On December 28, 2021, Ernst died at her home in Perkiomenville, Pennsylvania. She was predeceased by her husband Albert T. Ernst, Sr. on February 2, 2011, and her five brothers and three sisters.
