= Perkiomenville, Pennsylvania =

Unincorporated community in Pennsylvania, US

- Unincorporated community
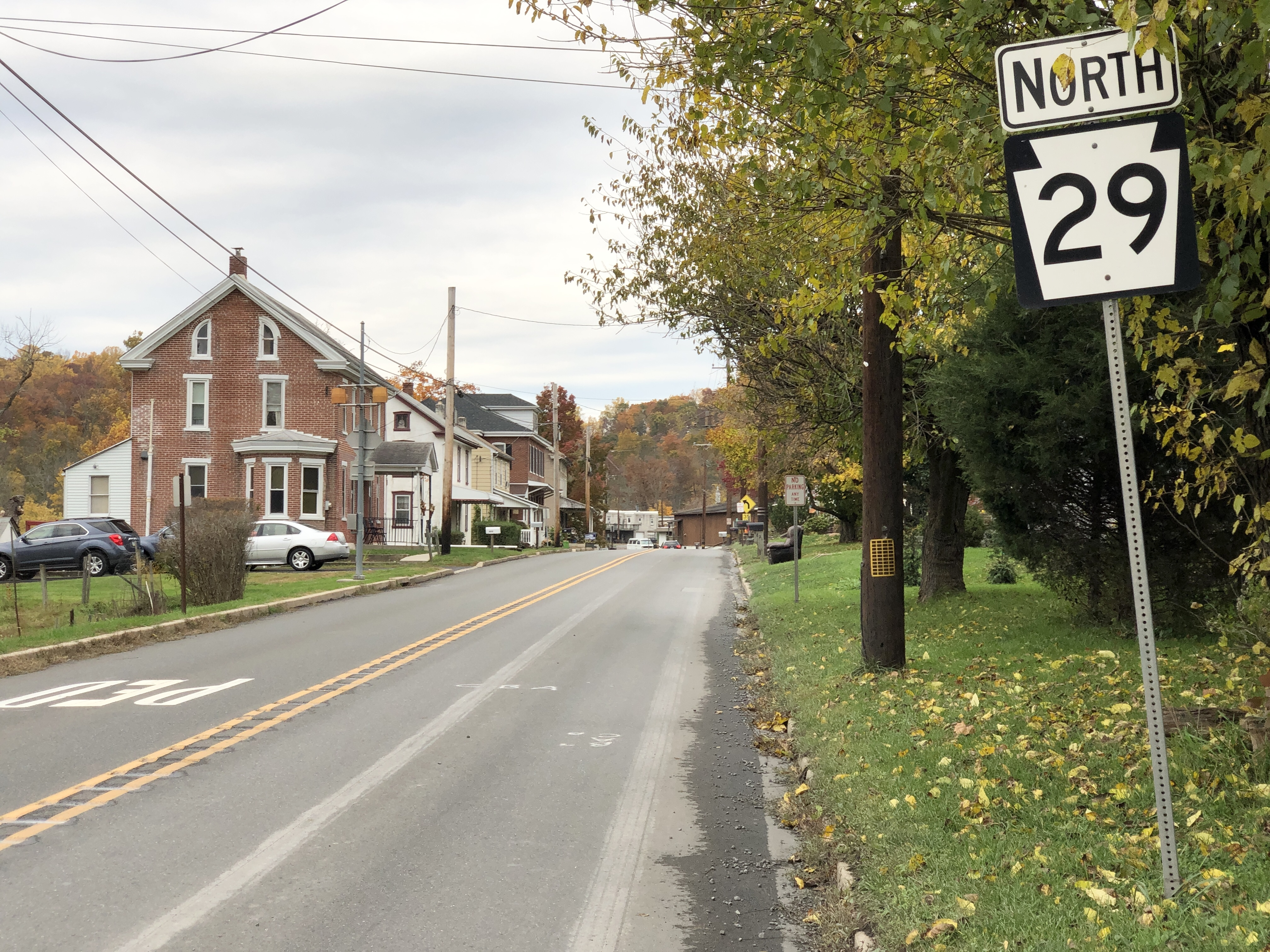
- Perkiomenville along PA 29

- Location within Pennsylvania Location within the United States
- Coordinates: 40°19′26.4″N 75°28′40.8″W
- Country: United States
- State: Pennsylvania
- County: Montgomery
- Township: Marlborough
- Elevation: 203 ft (62 m)
- Time zone: UTC-5 (Eastern (EST))
  - Summer (DST): UTC-4 (EDT)
- ZIP Code: 18074
- Area codes: 215, 267 and 445
- GNIS feature ID: 1183592

Perkiomenville is an unincorporated community that is located in the north-west section of Montgomery County, Pennsylvania, United States.

== History ==
The community takes its name from nearby Perkiomen Creek.

== Geography ==
Situated in the Philadelphia metropolitan area of the Northeastern United States, this community's boundary follows its postal delivery area. Perkiomenville straddles both sides of the Perkiomen Creek, which separates Marlborough Township and Upper Frederick Township. The community is bordered by Green Lane, PA to the north and Zieglerville, PA to the south along Route 29. This community is part of the Eastern Standard time zone.

== Sites ==
- Perkiomenville Hotel - retired
- Bridge 99 - now part of the Perkiomen Trail
- Green Lane Park
- Perkiomenville Auction & Flea Market

== Notable people ==
- Paul Collins, American writer
- John William Ditter Jr., former U.S. federal judge
- Eunice Katherine M. Ernst, pioneer of the nurse midwife movement
- God Lives Underwater, electronic music artists
- Ed Hake, football player
- Sasha Siemel, jungle hunter and adventurer
- Stella James Sims, biologist at Bluefield State College
