= Mike Getto =

American football player and coach (1905–1960)

Profile
- Position: Tackle

Personal information
- Born: September 18, 1905; Irwin, Pennsylvania, U.S.
- Died: August 27, 1960 (aged 54); Lawrence, Kansas, U.S.

Career information
- College: Pittsburgh

Career history
- 1928: Pittsburgh (assistant)
- 1929–1938: Kansas (assistant)
- 1940: Kansas
- 1947–1950: Kansas (assistant)
- 1942: Brooklyn Dodgers

Awards and highlights
- Consensus All-American (1928)
- Coaching profile at Pro Football Reference

Michael J. Getto (September 18, 1905 – August 27, 1960) was a professional football coach in the National Football League for the Brooklyn Dodgers in 1942. That season, he coached Brooklyn to a 3–8 record. Prior to his coaching career, Getto played college football while attending the University of Pittsburgh, where he earned All-American honors in 1928. After graduating from Pitt, Getto remained with the school as a football coach for the freshman team. He then worked as an assistant football coach from 1929 to 1939 and again in 1947 to 1950 at the University of Kansas. While at Kansas, Getto inspired his hometown of Jeannette, Pennsylvania to adopt the Jayhawk mascot for their high school athletic teams.
