= Howard Harpster =

American football player and coach (1907–1980)

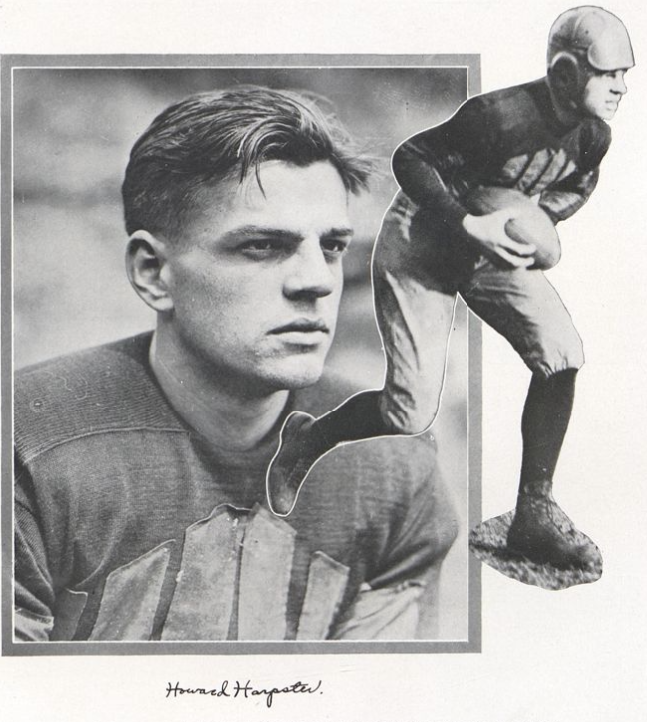

Biographical details
- Born: May 14, 1907; Salem, Ohio, U.S.
- Died: March 9, 1980 (aged 72); Pittsburgh, Pennsylvania, U.S.

Playing career
- 1926–1928: Carnegie Tech
- Position: Quarterback

Coaching career (HC unless noted)
- 1930–1932: Geneva
- 1933–1936: Carnegie Tech

Head coaching record
- Overall: 34–25–5

Accomplishments and honors

Championships
- 2 Tri-State (1930–1931)

Awards
- Consensus All-American (1928); First-team All-Eastern (1928)
- College Football Hall of Fame; Inducted in 1956 (profile)

Howard Harpster (May 14, 1907 – April 9, 1980) was an American college football player and coach. He played football as a quarterback at the Carnegie Institute of Technology—now known as Carnegie Mellon University—from 1926 to 1928. He was consensus selection to the 1928 College Football All-America Team. Harpster served as the head football coach at Geneva College in Beaver Falls, Pennsylvania from 1930 to 1932 and at his alma mater, Carnegie Tech, from 1933 to 1936, compiling a career coaching record of 34–25–5. He was inducted into the College Football Hall of Fame as a player in 1956.

== Playing career ==
Harpster played quarterback for the Carnegie Mellon University (then called "Carnegie Tech") from 1926 until 1928. The College Football Hall of Fame states that he was known as "one of the great Eastern quarterbacks of the late 1920s." In 1926, Carnegie Tech's football team beat Knute Rockne's Notre Dame Fighting Irish. The game was ranked the fourth-greatest upset in college football history by ESPN.

Harpster was one of 11 All-American football players to appear in the 1930 film Maybe It's Love.

== Coaching career ==
=== Geneva ===
Harpster was the 15th head football coach at Geneva College in Beaver Falls, Pennsylvania and he held that position for three seasons, from 1930 until 1932. His coaching record at Geneva was 22–6–2.

Geneva College fans generally consider him among the best coaches in the history of the school. His teams were considered among the leading small college teams in the country at the time.

=== Carnegie Tech ===
In 1933, Harpster returned to Carnegie Tech and coached for four years. His teams produced a record of 12–19–3.

== Head coaching record ==
Year	Team	Overall	Conference	Standing	Bowl/playoffs
Geneva Covenanters (Tri-State Conference) (1930–1932)
1930	Geneva	9–1	3–0	1st	
1931	Geneva	6–2–2	3–0	1st	
1932	Geneva	7–3	3–1	2nd	
Geneva:		22–6–2	9–1		
Carnegie Tech Tartans (Independent) (1933–1936)
1933	Carnegie Tech	4–3–2			
1934	Carnegie Tech	4–5			
1935	Carnegie Tech	2–5–1			
1936	Carnegie Tech	2–6			
Carnegie Tech:		12–19–3			
Total:		34–25–5			
National championship Conference title Conference division title or championship game berth
