= Chris Cagle (American football) =

American football player (1905–1942)

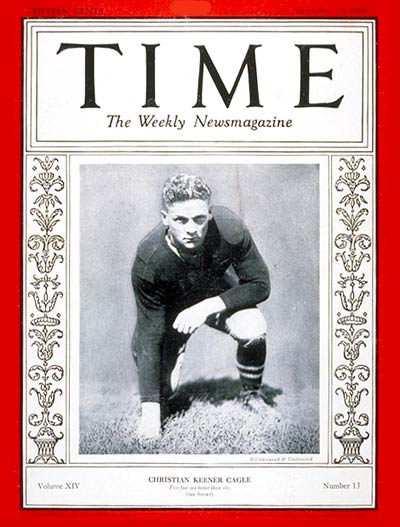
- Cagle on the cover of Time magazine

No. 12
- Positions: Halfback, Quarterback

Personal information
- Born: May 1, 1905; Merryville, Louisiana, U.S.
- Died: December 26, 1942 (aged 37); New York, New York, U.S.
- Listed height: 5 ft 10 in (1.78 m)
- Listed weight: 174 lb (79 kg)

Career information
- High school: Merryville (LA)
- College: Southwestern Louisiana (1922–1925); Army (1926–1929)

Career history

Playing
- New York Giants (1930–1932); Brooklyn Dodgers (1933–1934)

Coaching
- Mississippi A&M (1930) Head coach

Operations
- Brooklyn Dodgers (1933–1934) Co-owner

Awards and highlights
- Unanimous All-American (1928); 2× Consensus All-American (1927, 1929); 2× First-team All-Eastern (1928, 1929)

Career NFL statistics
- Rushing yards: 391
- Rushing average: 2.7
- Rushing touchdowns: 2
- Receptions: 13
- Receiving yards: 194
- Receiving touchdowns: 2
- TD–INT: 6–18
- Passing yards: 749
- Stats at Pro Football Reference

Head coaching record
- Career: 2–7 (.222)
- College Football Hall of Fame

Christian Keener "Red" Cagle (May 1, 1905 – December 26, 1942) was an American professional football player in the National Football League (NFL). He was a three-time All-American playing college football for the Army Black Knights A star halfback, Cagle's prominence landed him on the cover of Time magazine in 1929.

For five seasons, running from 1930 to 1934, Cagle played professional football in the NFL. His 1932 salary with the New York Football Giants was second highest in the entire league. The following year Cagle became a co-owner of the new Brooklyn Dodgers NFL franchise, for which he also played, selling his stake upon his retirement in 1934.

Cagle was inducted into the College Football Hall of Fame in 1954.

== College career ==
Cagle first starred at the University of Louisiana at Lafayette (then named Southwestern Louisiana Institute or SLI) from 1922 to 1925, where he earned a degree in arts and sciences. In his career at Southwestern Louisiana, he scored 235 points from touchdowns, extra points and field goals, a school record that lasted until 1989. His time at Southwestern Louisiana has him placed among the all-time greats of early Southern football. Besides being the football captain (1925), he also was a star in basketball and track and field sports at Southwestern Louisiana, where he received a degree in arts and sciences.

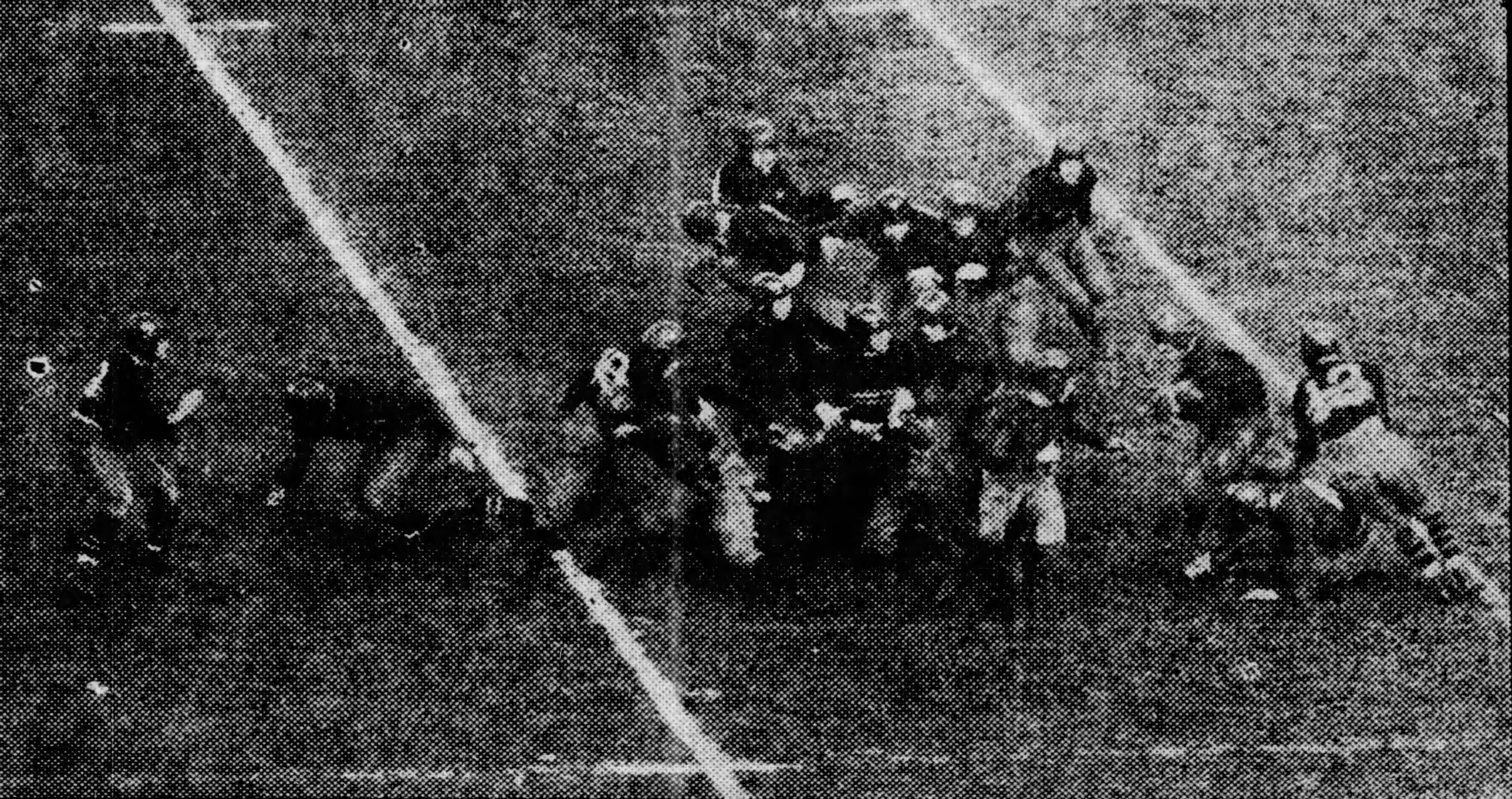
Cagle being tackled during October 30, 1926, game against Yale Bulldogs at the Yale Bowl

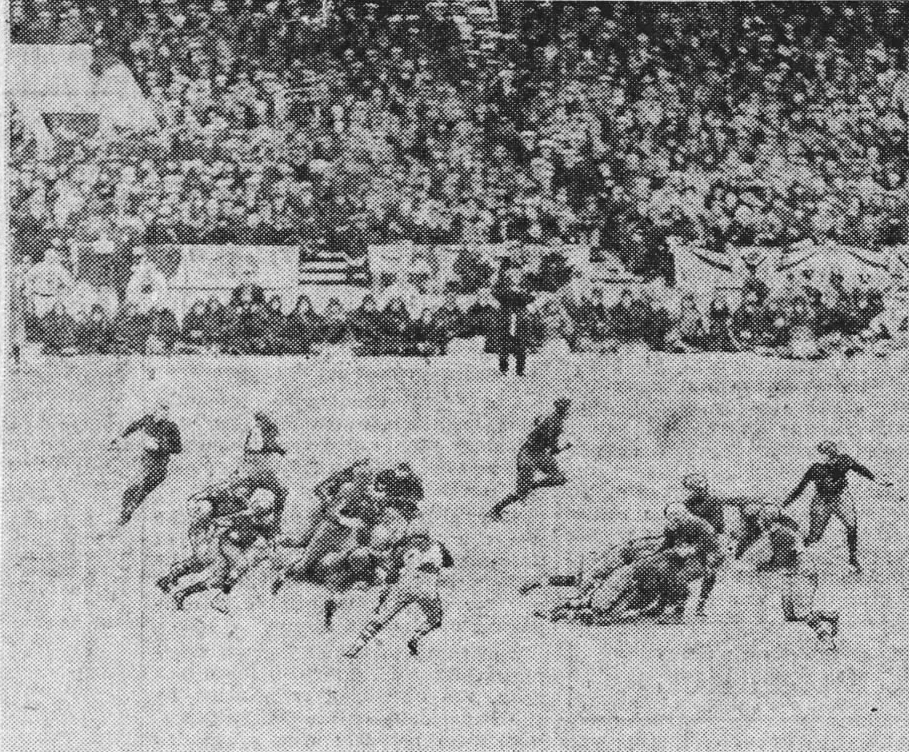
Cagle running the ball during the 1926 Army–Navy Game at Soldier Field

Cagle then played football for four years in the Army football team at the United States Military Academy, from 1926 to 1929, but did not graduate because he had secretly married in August 1928 in violation of academy rules. He was forced to resign in May 1930. Known as the "Red Thunderbolt of West Point," he was an All-American halfback for the last three years.His longest runs were 75 yards against Yale, 1928; 70 yards against Ohio Wesleyan, and 65 yards against Yale, 1929. In four years at Army he scored 169 points, averaged 6.4 yards per attempt in rushing and 26.4 yards on kickoff returns. During the 1926 and 1927 Army football seasons, Cagle paired with Harry Wilson to form one of the greatest duo of halfbacks in college football history.

As the team captain in 1929, he was featured on the September 23 cover of Time magazine of that same year. Cagle was noted for playing with the chin strap loose from his helmet, and sometimes without helmet. Sportswriters liked to refer to him as "Onward Christian" because of his ability to advance the ball.

== Professional career ==
Cagle played professional football for five seasons, including the New York Giants from 1930 to 1932. During his final year with the Giants Cagel was the highest paid member of the team, earning a handsome $500 per game — second in the entire league to the $550 per game earned by superstar halfback Red Grange of the Chicago Bears. By way of comparison, most of his teammates on the 1932 Giants squad earned barely over $100 per game.

In 1933, he and fellow former New York Giants player John Simms Kelly became co-owners of the NFL's Brooklyn Dodgers franchise, with Cagle continuing to play for the club in 1933 and 1934. Millionaire tinplate heir Dan Topping bought Cagle's half of the team in 1934.

== Personal life ==
Born in Merryville, Louisiana, he was one of eight children, including five brothers and two sisters. Cagle was named after an uncle, who in turn was named after the late Bishop Christian Keener of the Methodist church. He attended high school in Merryville, a small community about 20 miles (30 km) southwest of De Ridder. According to local legend, he was known for getting off the school bus and racing it to school, a race that he quite often won. The football field at Merryville High School is named Keener Cagle Field in his honor.

He secretly married Marian Haile in 1928 after meeting her at Louisiana-Lafayette.

Cagle died on December 26, 1942, at 37 years of age. He was believed to have tripped down a flight of stairs at the Fulton Street station of the New York City Subway on December 23. According to The Advertiser report, "Cagle tripped and fell the full length of a flight of subway steps." He died three days later of a fractured skull. At the time of his death he had lived in a Queens apartment house with his wife and was employed by an insurance company.

== Head coaching record ==
Year	Team	Overall	Conference	Standing	Bowl/playoffs
Mississippi A&M Aggies (Southern Conference) (1930)
1930	Mississippi A&M	2–7	2–3	14th	
Mississippi A&M:		2–7	2–3		
Total:		2–7			
