= Brooklyn Dodgers (NFL) =

American football team in the National Football League (1930–1943)

Logo

General information
- Founded: 1930
- Folded: 1945, Players assigned to Boston Yanks
- Stadium: Ebbets Field (1930–1944); Yankee Stadium (1945)
- Headquartered: Brooklyn, New York, United States
- Colors: Blue, silver, white (1930–1937) Red, blue, silver, white (1937–1943) Burnt orange, black, white (1944)

Personnel
- Owners: Bill Dwyer & Jack Depler (1930–1933); Chris Cagle & John Simms "Shipwreck" Kelly (1934); John Simms "Shipwreck" Kelly & Dan Topping (1934–1945)
- General manager: Tom Gallery (1944)
- Head coach: Jack Depler (1930–1931); Benny Friedman (1932); Cap McEwan (1933–1934); Paul Schissler (1935–1936); Potsy Clark (1937–1939); Jock Sutherland (1940–1941); Mike Getto (1942); Pete Cawthon (1943–1944); Ed Kubale (1944); Frank Bridges (1944)

Team history
- Brooklyn Dodgers (1930–1943); Brooklyn Tigers (1944); Yanks (1945)

League / conference affiliations
- National Football League; Eastern Division

The Brooklyn Dodgers were an American football team that played in the National Football League from 1930 to 1943, and in 1944 as the Brooklyn Tigers. The team played its home games at Ebbets Field, the home of the National League baseball team of the same name. In 1945, because of financial difficulties and the increasing scarcity of major league-level players because of the war-time defense requirements at the height of World War II, the team was merged with the Boston Yanks and were known as the Yanks for that season.

This franchise was not related to the earlier (second incarnation) American Football League II with a franchise that played as the Brooklyn Tigers for the first half of the 1936 season before moving to Rochester, New York and playing as the Rochester Tigers. Another NFL team that played in the Brooklyn borough was the Brooklyn Lions (which became the Brooklyn Horsemen after merging with a team from an earlier first incarnation AFL of the same name) in 1926.

In 1946, co-owner and partner Dan Topping (1912–1974) pulled the Tigers team out of the NFL and placed it in the newly established rival professional league – the All-America Football Conference, which shortly lasted until 1949, until three teams from the AAFC merged with and entered a reorganized NFL in 1950.

== History ==
=== Early years ===
The team began play in 1930 after two Brooklyn businessmen bought the Dayton Triangles for $2,500 and moved the NFL franchise to Ebbets Field. These two individuals were Bill Dwyer, a past owner of the New York Americans and Pittsburgh Pirates of the National Hockey League, and Jack Depler, a player-coach for the NFL's Orange Tornadoes. Dwyer and Depler then renamed the Triangles the Brooklyn Dodgers, borrowing the former name of the Brooklyn Robins, Brooklyn's major league baseball team, who had been named the Brooklyn Trolley Dodgers in 1911 and 1912. The Brooklyn baseball team would again adopt the name Brooklyn Dodgers in 1932.

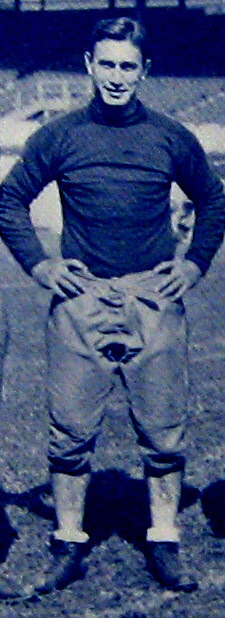
Benny Friedman

While operating under the Triangles franchise, the Dodgers were essentially a new team. The roster was dominated by players from the 1929 Tornadoes, with most of the 1929 Triangles roster riding the bench. Many former Triangles were unable to relocate their families during the Great Depression. The Dodgers finished fourth in the NFL with a 7–4–1 record, a massive improvement upon the Triangles' disastrous final seasons in Dayton. Indeed, the seven wins were two more than the Triangles had managed in the previous seven seasons combined.

The high point of their season consisted of a 7–6 upset over the New York Giants at the end of November. The Dodgers star back was Jack McBride, a former Giant. He led the league in scoring with a total of 56 points in 1930. The 1931 season saw the Dodgers significantly regress to a 2–12 record. Once the season ended, Benny Friedman was brought in as the team's new player-coach.

The 1932 season started off promising with wins over the Staten Island Stapletons and the new Boston Braves (later renamed the Redskins). The team soon hit a five-game losing streak. The streak ended with a 3–0 win over the Chicago Cardinals, followed by four more losses. They ended the season 3–9.

=== Post-Dwyer era ===
At the end of the 1932 season, Bill Dwyer had enough of professional football. His three years with the Dodgers had cost him an estimated $30,000. The Dodgers were then purchased by two former New York Giants players, Chris Cagle and John Simms Kelly for $25,000. Cap McEwen, a successful college football coach, was then brought in to replace Friedman, who would continue to play tailback for the Dodgers through half of the upcoming season. The 1933 season also saw the NFL split into two divisions. The Dodgers were placed in the Eastern Division and had a chance for first place, by posting a 5–2–1 record. A 10–0 loss to the Giants in front of 28,000 Brooklyn fans at Ebbets Field ended that chance in November.

The following season, Dan Topping bought Chris Cagle's half of the team. Topping would later become an owner and president of baseball's New York Yankees. Meanwhile, Cagle continued to play in the Brooklyn backfield. Brooklyn signed Ralph Kercheval, who later became one of the great NFL kickers. He returned to play for Brooklyn for the next seven seasons and scored every Dodgers point in their last six games as they finished with a 4–7 record.

In 1935, Paul Schissler. the former coach of the Chicago Cardinals, took over as the Dodgers coach. Stars Cagle, Friedman, and Kelly all retired. As a result, the Dodgers line-up consisted of 15 rookies. The 1935 season did show the team posting a 5–6–1 record and second place in the Eastern Division. Over the next four seasons, the Dodgers placed either in the fourth or third place in the Eastern standings. Several of the star players to wear a Dodgers uniform during this time included Harold "Bunker" Hill, Bob Wilson, and Bill Lee. The roster also included future Hall of Famers, Red Badgro and Ace Parker. Both men had played professional baseball in the majors. Badgro played for the St. Louis Browns before playing in the NFL for the Giants and Yankees. Meanwhile, Parker played under Connie Mack, while as a member of the Philadelphia Athletics. He is best known for hitting a home run his first time at bat as a pinch hitter, becoming the first player in American League history to do so. Another future Hall of Famer joined the team in 1938, Frank Kinard. Kinard would play for Brooklyn for the rest of the franchise's history.

The Dodgers made NFL history on October 22, 1939. That day, at Ebbets Field, the Dodgers played the Philadelphia Eagles in the first NFL game shown on television. The Dodgers won the game 23–14.

=== Jock Sutherland era ===
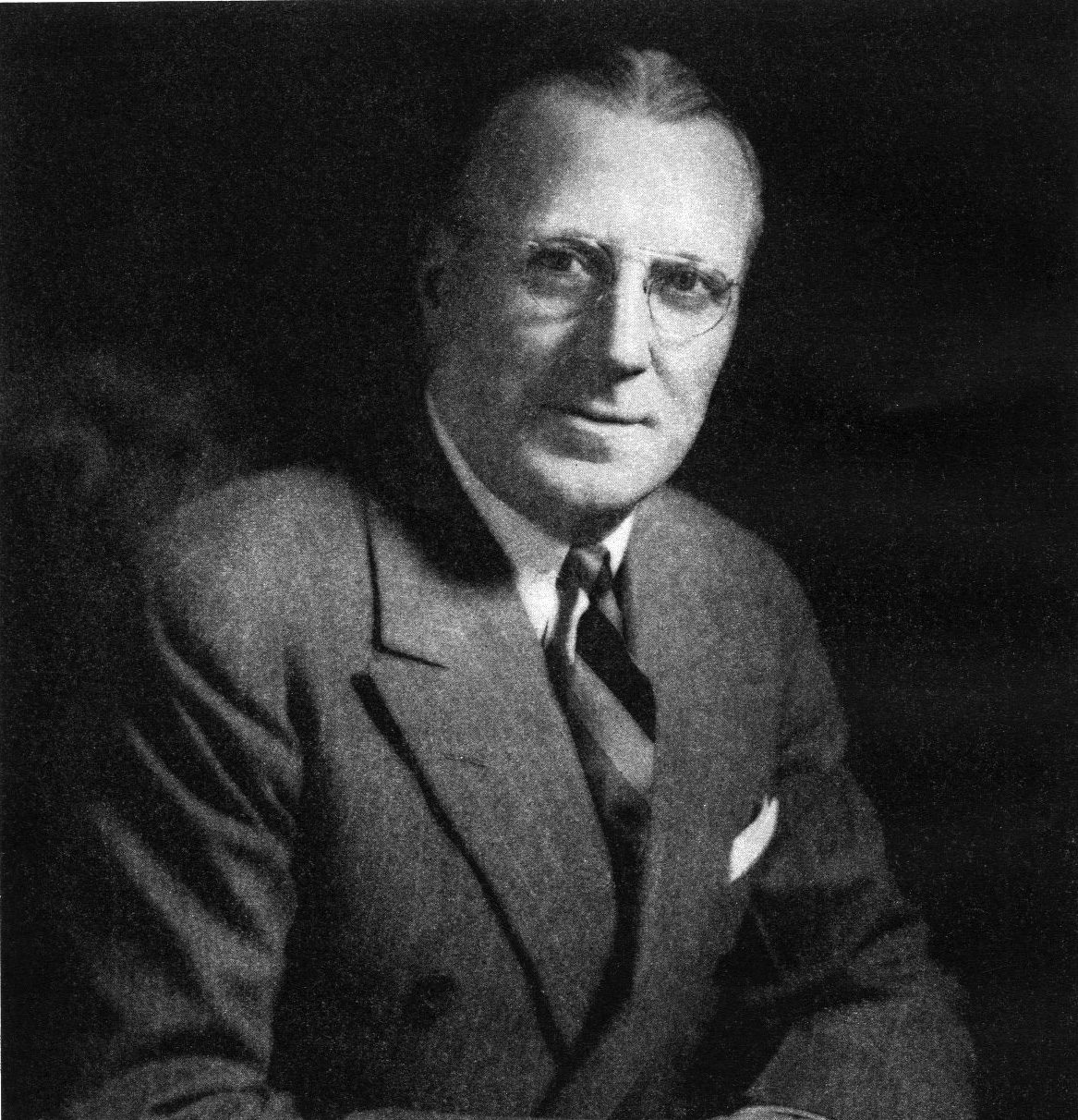
Dr. John B. "Jock" Sutherland, coach of the Dodgers from 1940.

In 1940, the Dodgers chose Jock Sutherland as their team's next coach. Sutherland brought to Brooklyn the Single-wing formation, which he had used at Lafayette College and Pitt. Under Sutherland, Brooklyn finished in second place in the Eastern standings behind the Redskins. Meanwhile, Parker was awarded the Joseph Carr Trophy as the league's Official Most Valuable Player. During this time, Dodger staples Mike Gussie All American from West Virginia University, Dick Cassiano and Ben Kish, who played for Sutherland at Pitt; George Cafego and Banks McFadden were signed by the team.

Game program from Brooklyn's penultimate season as the "Tigers".

In 1941, the team again landed in second place of the Eastern Division, behind only the Giants. Dodger Clarence "Pug" Manders won the NFL rushing title that season with 486 yards. His title still represents the smallest number of yards carried to ever win this title. Warren Alfson and Merlyn Condit joined the team that season. Sutherland's 1940 and 1941 campaigns would be the most successful during the franchise's history.

=== Decline ===
Beginning in 1942, the team went into a steep decline, as World War II caused a shortage of players and fans. Coach Sutherland, along with Ace Parker and several other players left the team to join the military and Mike Getto took over as coach. With the core of the team gone, the Dodgers sank to a 3–8–0 record. A year later, they won only two games. In 1944, Dan Topping chose Tom Gallery to run the team while he was serving in the armed forces.

In 1944, the team was renamed the Tigers, but suffered an 0–10 regular season record. In a desperate attempt for survival, the team merged with the Boston Yanks for the 1945 season. The merged team played four home games in Boston and one in New York, but fans from neither city cared as they finished with a 3–6–1 record. The merger occurred on April 10, 1945 after the 1945 NFL draft.

== Topping, the Dodgers and the AAFC ==
In December 1945, Topping announced his intentions to accept the All-America Football Conference's New York franchise. In response to this defection, the NFL immediately cancelled his NFL team franchise, and all of its players were assigned to Boston.

Meanwhile, the AAFC planted another team in Brooklyn called the Dodgers, and the two teams would merge in 1949. Topping's Yankees employed several former Dodgers players in 1946 and 1947 such as Parker, Kinard and Manders, and the Yankees reached the AAFC Championship Game in both years (being beaten by the Cleveland Browns in both games).

== Indirect ties to the Indianapolis Colts ==
The sequence of events begun by the demise of the Brooklyn Dodgers NFL team eventually resulted in the creation of what is now the Indianapolis Colts.

The Boston Yanks moved to New York as the Bulldogs in 1949. After the 1949 season the NFL added three teams from the AAFC. The AAFC Yankees players were split between the Giants and Bulldogs. The Bulldogs renamed themselves the New York Yanks in the same season.

After the 1951 season, Yanks owner Ted Collins sold the franchise back to the league. The NFL then sold it to a new owner, Giles Miller, who moved the team to Dallas and renamed it the Dallas Texans. Miller returned his franchise to the league in the middle of the 1952 season, and the NFL operated it as a traveling team before folding it at the end of the season. In 1953, the NFL granted an expansion franchise to a Baltimore-based group and awarded it the remains of the Texans organization. The team, named the Colts, relocated to Indianapolis in 1984. The NFL does not consider the Colts a continuation of the Dodgers.

== First-round draft selections ==
Year	Pick	Player	College	Position	Notes
1936	4	Dick Crayne	Iowa	Fullback	
1937	2	Ed Goddard	Washington State	Back	
1938	3	Boyd Brumbaugh	Duquesne	Back	
1939	5	Bob MacLeod	Dartmouth	Back	
1940	4	Banks McFadden	Clemson	Back	
1941	8	Dean McAdams	Washington	Halfback	
1942	7	Bobby Robertson	Southern California	Runningback	
1943	4	Paul Governali	Columbia	Quarterback	
1944	3	Creighton Miller	Notre Dame	Halfback	
1945	3	Joe Renfroe	Tulane	Back	

== Pro Football Hall of Famers ==
Brooklyn Dodgers/Tigers Hall of Famers
Players
No.	Name	Position	Tenure	Inducted
17	Morris "Red" Badgro	End	1936	1981
—	Benny Friedman	QB/Coach	1932–1934	2005
—	Frank "Bruiser" Kinard	T	1938–1944	1971
—	Clarence "Ace" Parker	QB/HB	1937–1941	1972

== Multi-time Pro Bowlers ==
The Dodgers are the only defunct franchise to send a player to the Pro Bowl/All-Star Game multiple times apart from the New York Yanks' Brad Ecklund.

- Frank "Bruiser" Kinard (5 times)
- Perry Schwartz (4 times)
- Clarence "Pug" Manders (3 times)

== Season-by-season ==
Brooklyn Tigers logo

	Year	W	L	T	Finish	Coach
Brooklyn Dodgers	1930	7	4	1	4th	Jack Depler
Brooklyn Dodgers	1931	2	12	0	9th	Jack Depler
Brooklyn Dodgers	1932	3	9	0	6th	Benny Friedman
Brooklyn Dodgers	1933	5	4	1	2nd East	Cap McEwen
Brooklyn Dodgers	1934	4	7	0	3rd East	Cap McEwen
Brooklyn Dodgers	1935	5	6	1	2nd East	Paul J. Schissler
Brooklyn Dodgers	1936	3	8	1	4th East	Paul J. Schissler
Brooklyn Dodgers	1937	3	7	1	4th East	Potsy Clark
Brooklyn Dodgers	1938	4	4	3	3rd East	Potsy Clark
Brooklyn Dodgers	1939	4	6	1	3rd East	Potsy Clark
Brooklyn Dodgers	1940	8	3	0	2nd East	Jock Sutherland
Brooklyn Dodgers	1941	7	4	0	2nd East	Jock Sutherland
Brooklyn Dodgers	1942	3	8	0	4th East	Mike Getto
Brooklyn Dodgers	1943	2	8	0	4th East	Pete Cawthon
Brooklyn Tigers	1944	0	10	0	5th East	Pete Cawthon, Ed Kubale, Frank Bridges
Yanks (merged with Boston Yanks)	1945	3	6	1	3rd East	Herb Kopf
Total	1930–1945	63	106	10		
