= Paul Scull =

American football player (1907–1997)

- Paul Scull, 1928–1929, varsity basketball player

Penn Quakers
- Positions: Halfback, Punter

Personal information
- Born: September 4, 1907; Merchantville, New Jersey, U.S.
- Died: December 11, 1997 (aged 90); Charlotte, North Carolina, U.S.
- Listed weight: 185 lb (84 kg)

Career information
- College: Penn (1926–1928)

Awards and highlights
- Consensus All-American (1928); First-team All-Eastern (1928)

Paul Thomas "Butterball" Scull, Sr. (September 4, 1907 – December 11, 1997) was an American football player. Considered a triple-threat man while playing for Penn from 1926 to 1928, he was a consensus first-team All-American halfback in 1928.

== Early life ==
Born in New Jersey, Scull moved with his family to Lower Merion, Pennsylvania as a boy. He played high school football at Lower Merion High School from 1922 to 1924, helping lead the team to a 26-0-1 record during his three years as a player.

== Penn ==
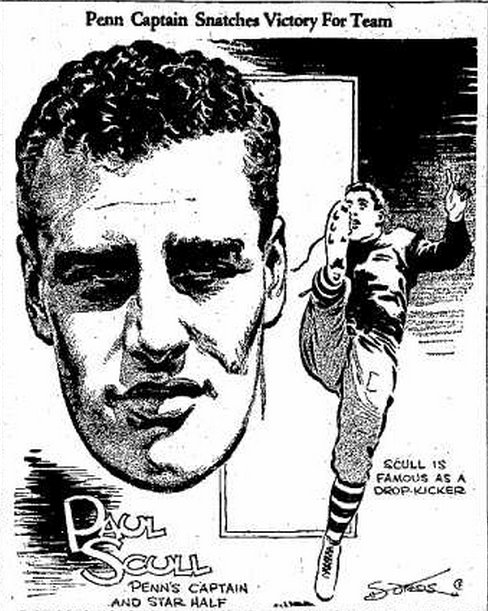
Newspaper cartoon of Scull, November 1928

Scull played at the halfback and punter positions for the University of Pennsylvania from 1926 to 1928. In November 1927, he was elected to serve as the captain of Penn's 1928 football team. He was a consensus first-team All-American in 1928. He holds Penn's all-time record with 312 all-purpose yards in a game.

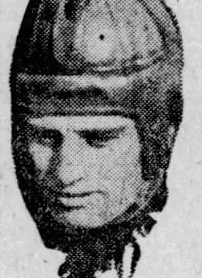
Image of Scull playing football in 1926

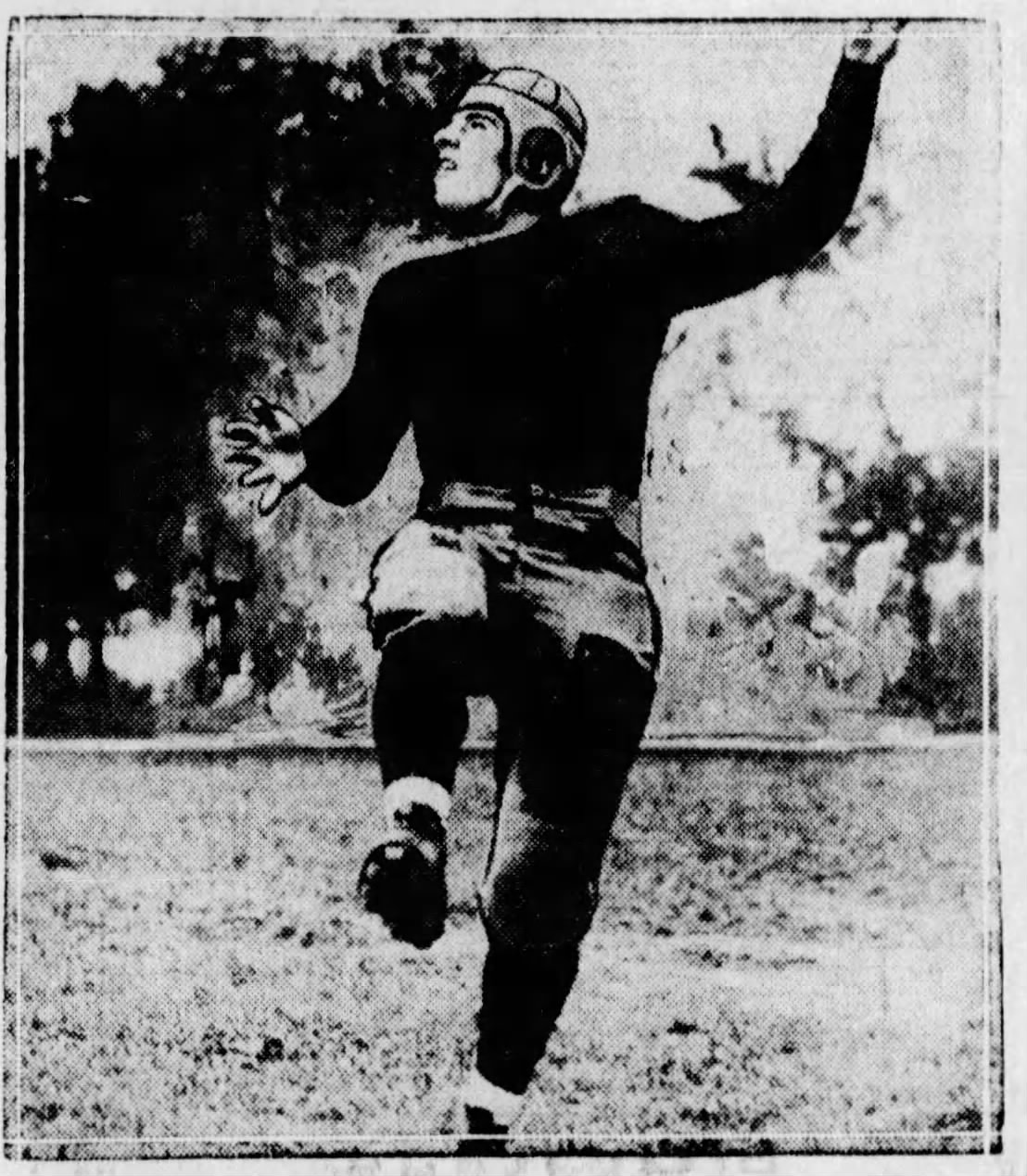
Image of Scull playing football in 1928

Scull was a member of the Kappa chapter of Theta Chi fraternity. In 1929, Scull was selected as the inaugural recipient of Theta Chi fraternity's Reginald E.F. Colley Award, the highest award for a collegiate member which recognizes service to alma mater, fraternity, and chapter.

== Later life ==
Scull was one of 11 All-American football players to appear in the 1930 film "Maybe It's Love".

He became a physical education instructor at Penn after graduating. In 1964, he was selected as a second-team halfback on the All-Time Philadelphia All Scholastic Team. He was inducted into the University of Pennsylvania Athletic Hall of Fame in 2003. In his later years, Scull lived in North Carolina. He was employed for 36 years in the personnel department of Hercules Inc. He died in 1997 at Charlotte, North Carolina.
