= Mike Riordan (American football) =

American football player (1906–1989)

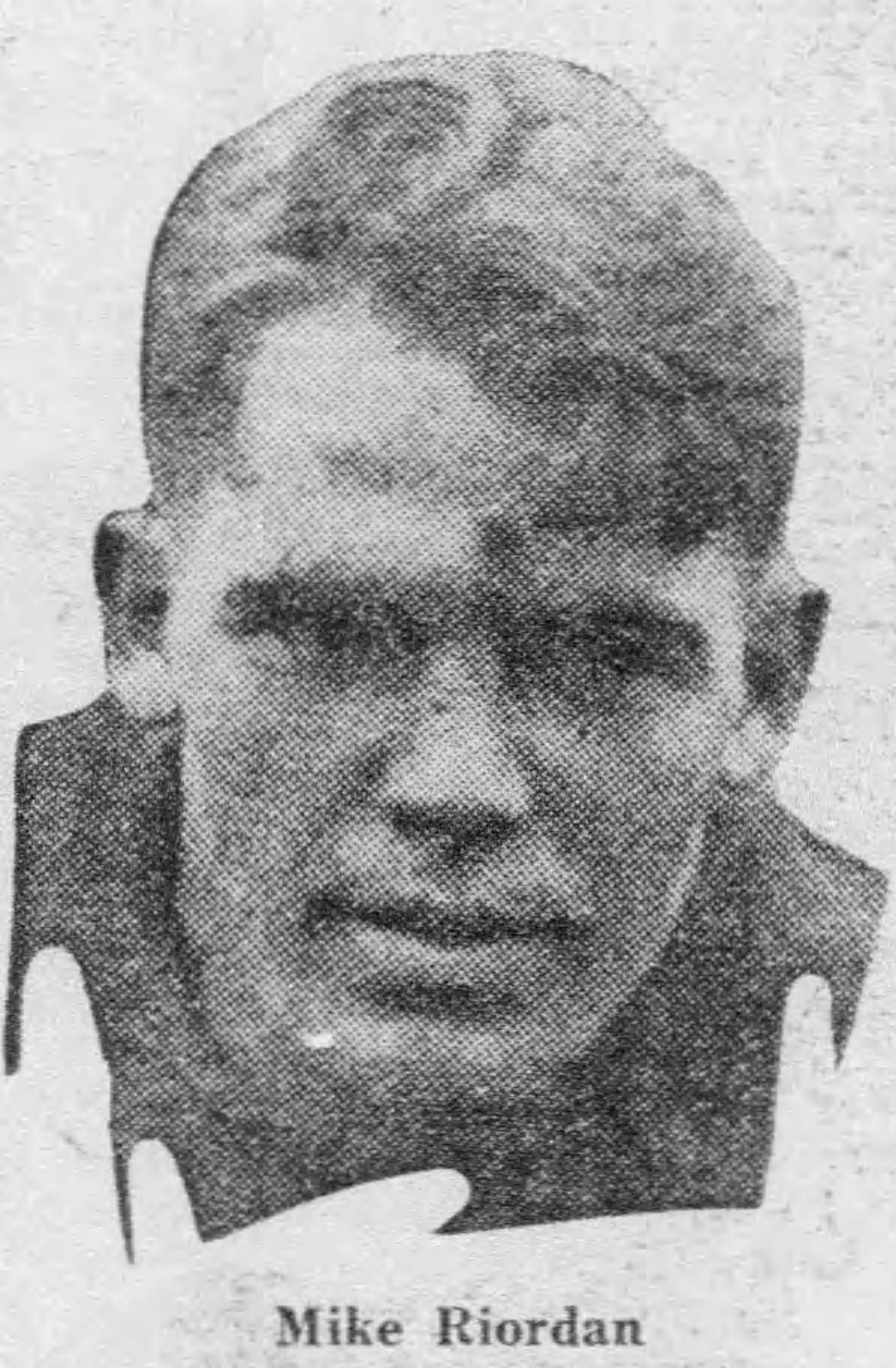
- Mike Riordan, 1928

Profile
- Position: Fullback

Personal information
- Born: September 4, 1906; Bristol, Connecticut
- Died: February 14, 1989 (aged 82); Trenton, New Jersey
- Listed height: 5 ft 11 in (1.80 m)
- Listed weight: 195 lb (88 kg)

Career information
- High school: Bristol Central High School
- College: NYU

Career history
- Staten Island Stapletons (1929)

Charles J. "Iron Mike" Riordan (September 4, 1906 – February 14, 1989) was an American football fullback. He played college football for NYU and professional football in the National Football League (NFL) for the Staten Island Stapletons. He appeared in nine NFL games, six as a starter, during the 1929 season. He scored two touchdowns in a September 29 game against Millville.
