= Edward Burke (American football) =

American football player and US Navy officer (1907–1967)

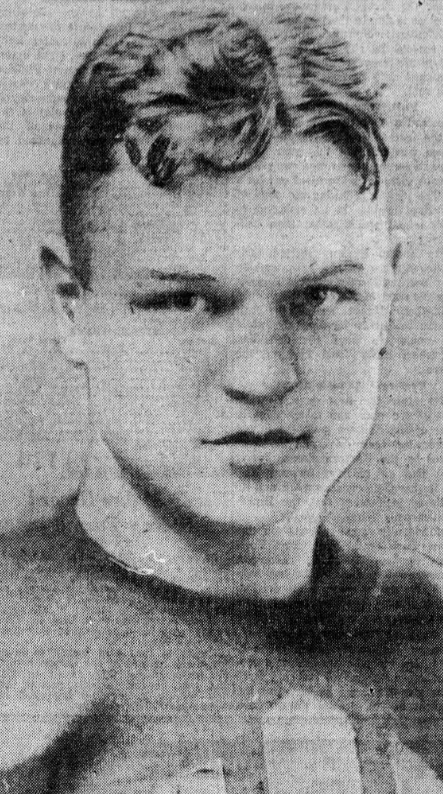
- Burke in 1927

Navy Midshipmen
- Position: Guard

Personal information
- Born: November 2, 1907; Larksville, Pennsylvania, U.S.
- Died: August 19, 1967 (aged 59)

Career information
- College: Navy (1926–1928)

Awards and highlights
- Consensus All-American (1928); First-team All-Eastern (1928)

Other information
- Military career
- Burial place: Arlington National Cemetery
- Spouse: Adele
- Children: 1
- Rank: Rear admiral
- Commands: USS Simpson; USS Plunkett; USS Des Moines
- Conflicts: World War II
- Awards: Navy Cross; Legion of Merit

Edward Joseph Burke (November 2, 1907 – August 19, 1967) was an American football player and officer in the United States Navy. He played college football at the United States Naval Academy and was a consensus first-team All-American guard in 1928. He thereafter served in the United States Navy, was the commanding officer of two destroyers during World War II, and attained the rank of rear admiral.

== Early life ==
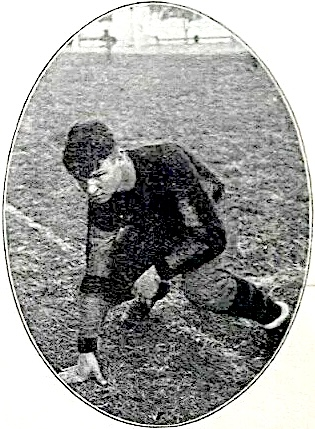
1926 football portrait of Burke

Burke was born in Larksville, Pennsylvania. Burke was raised in Wilkes-Barre, Pennsylvania, and was appointed to the United States Naval Academy in 1925. At the Academy, he played at the guard position for the Navy Midshipmen football team from 1926 to 1928. He was captain of the team in 1928. He was a consensus first-team selection to the 1928 College Football All-America Team. Burke graduated from the Naval Academy in 1929.

== Career ==
Burke spent his entire career in active service with the U.S. Navy. During World War II, he was the commander of two destroyers, USS Simpson and USS Plunkett. He received the Legion of Merit for his actions while commander of the USS Plunkett to rescue survivors from a burning hospital ship during the 1943 invasion of Italy. He received the Navy Cross for heroism during operations at Anzio, Italy in 1944. From 1946 to 1947, Burke was deputy navy advisor at the Office of Military Government for Germany in Berlin.

Burke was a professor of naval science at College of the Holy Cross. In 1959, Burke was assigned as director of enlisted personnel at the Bureau of Naval Personnel. He later became commander of the USS Des Moines. He attained the rank of rear admiral in 1959 upon retirement.

== Personal life ==
Burke married Adele. They had a daughter, Mrs. Patricia Gipple. Later in life, he lived in Sarasota, Florida.

Burke died on August 19, 1967. He was buried at Arlington National Cemetery.
