= 1928 All-America college football team =

Official list of the best college football players of 1928

The 1928 All-America college football team is composed of college football players who were selected as All-Americans by various organizations and writers that chose All-America college football teams in 1928. The seven selectors recognized by the NCAA as "official" for the 1928 season are (1) Collier's Weekly, as selected by Grantland Rice, (2) the Associated Press, (3) the United Press, (4) the All-America Board, (5) the International News Service (INS), (6) the Newspaper Enterprise Association (NEA), and (7) the North American Newspaper Alliance (NANA).

== Consensus All-Americans ==
Following the death of Walter Camp in 1925, there was a proliferation of All-American teams in the late 1920s. For the year 1929, the NCAA recognizes seven published All-American teams as "official" designations for purposes of its consensus determinations. The following chart identifies the NCAA-recognized consensus All-Americans and displays which first-team designations they received. Army halfback Red Cagle was the only player to be unanimously selected by all seven selectors as a first-team All-American.

Name	Position	School	Number	Selectors First-team selections
Red Cagle	Halfback	Army	7/7	AAB, AP, CO, INS, NANA, NEA, UP
Wes Fesler	End	Ohio State	5/7	AAB, CO, INS, NEA, UP
Seraphim Post	Guard	Stanford	5/7	AAB, AP, CO, INS, NEA
Peter Pund	Center	Georgia Tech	5/7	AAB, CO, INS, NEA, UP
Paul Scull	Halfback	Penn	5/7	AAB, CO, INS, NANA, NEA
Ken Strong	Fullback	NYU	5/7	AP, CO, INS, NEA, UP
Otto Pommerening	Tackle	Michigan	4/7	AP, CO, INS, UP
Mike Getto	Tackle	Pitt	4/7	AAB, CO, NANA, NEA
Howard Harpster	Quarterback	Carnegie Tech	4/7	AAB, CO, NEA, UP
Irvine Phillips	End	California	3/7	AAB, NANA, UP
Chuck Carroll	Halfback	Washington	3/7	AAB, AP, UP
Don Robesky	Guard	Stanford	2/7	NANA, UP
Edward Burke	Guard	Navy	2/7	AP, CO

== All-American selections for 1928 ==
=== Key ===
Bold – NCAA "consensus" All-Americans

Selectors recognized by NCAA in its consensus All-American determinations:

- AAB = All America Board
- AP = Associated Press
- COL = Collier's Weekly, as selected by Grantland Rice with assistance from Knute Rockne, Glenn Warner, Jesse Hawley, Fielding H. Yost, Robert Zuppke, Lou Young, Bill Roper, Wallace Wade, Dan McGugin and Clarence M. Price.
- NEA = Newspaper Enterprise Association
- UP = United Press, as selected by United Press sports editor Frank Getty, with advice from "coaches and officials throughout the country."
- INS = International News Service
- NANA = North American Newspaper Alliance

Other selectors:

- CP = Central Press Association, billed as the "Real" All-American team
- PAB = Pan-American Bank
- WC = Walter Camp Football Foundation
- 1 – First Team Selection
- 2 – Second Team Selection
- 3 – Third Team Selection
- Utility Selection – Only Grantland Rice in Collier's Weekly used this designation for three players in addition to those at eleven specified positions.
- HM – Honorable Mention Selection – Used by Frank Getty in the United Press All-America Team.

=== Ends ===
- **Irvine Phillips**, California (UP-1, WC-1, AAB, NANA, PAB, AP-2)
- **Wes Fesler**, Ohio State (College Football Hall of Fame) (CO-1, INS, NEA-1, UP-1, WC-1, AAB, AP-2, CP-2)
- Dale Van Sickel, Florida (College Football Hall of Fame) (AP-1, NEA-1, CO-Utility, UP-HM)
- Malcolm Franklin, St. Mary's (AP-1, UP-2)
- Ken Haycraft, Minnesota (CO-1, NANA, UP-2)
- Dick Abernathy, Vanderbilt (CP-1, UP-3)
- Theodore Rosenzweig, Carnegie Tech (CP-1, INS, NEA-2, UP-HM)
- Edwin Messinger, Army (PAB, CP-2, AP-3)
- Miller Brown, Missouri (AP-3)
- George Barna, Hobart (UP-3)

=== Tackles ===
- **Otto Pommerening**, Michigan (AP-1, CO-1, INS, UP-1, NEA-3)
- **Mike Getto**, Pittsburgh (CO-1, NANA, NEA-1, WC-1, AP-2, UP-2, AAB)
- Forrest Douds, Washington & Jefferson (UP-1, CO-Utility)
- Jesse Hibbs, USC (CP-1, NEA-1, UP-3)
- Gordy Brown, Texas (CP-1, AP-2, UP-3)
- Butch Nowack, Illinois (WC-1, UP-2, AP-3, AAB, NANA)
- Russell Crane, Illinois (CP-1)
- Frank Speer, Georgia Tech (AP-1)
- Alfred "Al" Lassman, New York Univ. (CP-2, NEA-2)
- Bud Sprague, Army (CP-2)
- Jimmy Steele, Florida (NEA-2)
- Melvyl Dressell, Washington State (AP-3)
- Steve Bancroft, California (PAB)
- Fred Miller, Notre Dame (INS, PAB)

=== Guards ===
- **Seraphim Post**, Stanford (AP-1, CO-1, CP-1, INS, NEA-1, WC-1, AAB)
- **Don Robesky**, Stanford (UP-1, NANA, NEA-2)
- **Edward Burke**, Navy (AP-1, CO-1, CP-2, NEA-2)
- George Gibson, Minnesota (UP-1, WC-1, AP-2, NEA-3, AAB)
- Danny McMullen, Nebraska (AP-2, INS, NEA-3, UP-3, PAB)
- Leroy Wietz, Illinois (NANA)
- Bill McRae, Florida (UP-2)
- Bull Brown, Vanderbilt (UP-2)
- Bruce Dumont, Colgate (AP-3)
- Choc Sanders, SMU (AP-3, UP-3)
- Waldo Wittenmeyer Greene, Yale (CP-2)
- John Dreshar, Carnegie Tech (PAB)

=== Centers ===
- **Peter Pund**, Georgia Tech (College Football Hall of Fame) (CO-1, INS, NEA-1, UP-1, WC-1, CP-2, AP-3, AAB)
- Charles Howe, Princeton (AP-1, CP-1, NEA-2, UP-2, NANA; PAB)
- Nate Barragar, USC (AP-2)
- Tim Moynihan, Notre Dame (UP-3)

=== Quarterbacks ===
- **Howard Harpster**, Carnegie Tech (College Football Hall of Fame) (CO-1, CP-1, NEA-1, UP-1, WC-1, AP-3, PAB, AAB)
- Dutch Clark, Colorado College (College and Pro Football Hall of Fame) (AP-1)
- Howard Maple, Oregon State (AP-2, UP-3)
- Frederick L. Hovde, Minnesota (CP-2)
- Don Williams, USC (NANA, UP-2)

=== Halfbacks ===
- **Chris Cagle**, Army (College Football Hall of Fame) (AP-1, CO-1, CP-1, INS, NANA, NEA-1, UP-1, WC-1, PAB, AAB)
- **Chuck Carroll**, Washington (AP-1, UP-1 [fb], WC-1, NEA-2, AAB)
- **Paul Scull**, Penn (CO-1, INS, NANA, NEA-1, WC-1, AP-2, UP-2 [fb], AAB)
- Warner Mizell, Georgia Tech (AP-2, CP-2, INS, NANA, NEA-2, UP-2)
- Clyde Crabtree, Florida (AP-3, NEA-3, UP-3 [fb])
- Willis Glassgow, Iowa (CP-2, AP-3, NEA-3)
- Bill Banker, Tulane (College Football Hall of Fame) (UP-2)
- Lloyd Brazil, Univ. of Detroit (CO-Utility, UP-3)
- Redman Hume, Southern Methodist (UP-3)
- Lloyd Thomas, Univ. South. Calif. (NEA-2, PAB)

=== Fullbacks ===
- **Ken Strong**, New York Univ. (AP-1, CO-1, CP-1 [hb], INS, NEA-1, UP-1 [hb])
- Blue Howell, Nebraska (CP-1)
- Clifford Hoffman, Stanford (AP-2)
- Gerald Snyder, Maryland (AP-3)
- Herschel Burgess, Texas A&M (CP-2)
- Mayes McLain, Iowa (PAB)

== See also ==
- 1928 All-Big Six Conference football team
- 1928 All-Big Ten Conference football team
- 1928 All-Pacific Coast Conference football team
- 1928 All-Southern football team
- 1928 All-Southwest Conference football team
