= The County Chairman =

The County Chairman may refer to:

- The County Chairman (1935 film), a 1935 comedy film
- The County Chairman (1914 film), a lost 1914 silent film drama
- The County Chairman (play), a 1903 comedy play by George Ade
