= Nathaniel D. Mann =

American composer

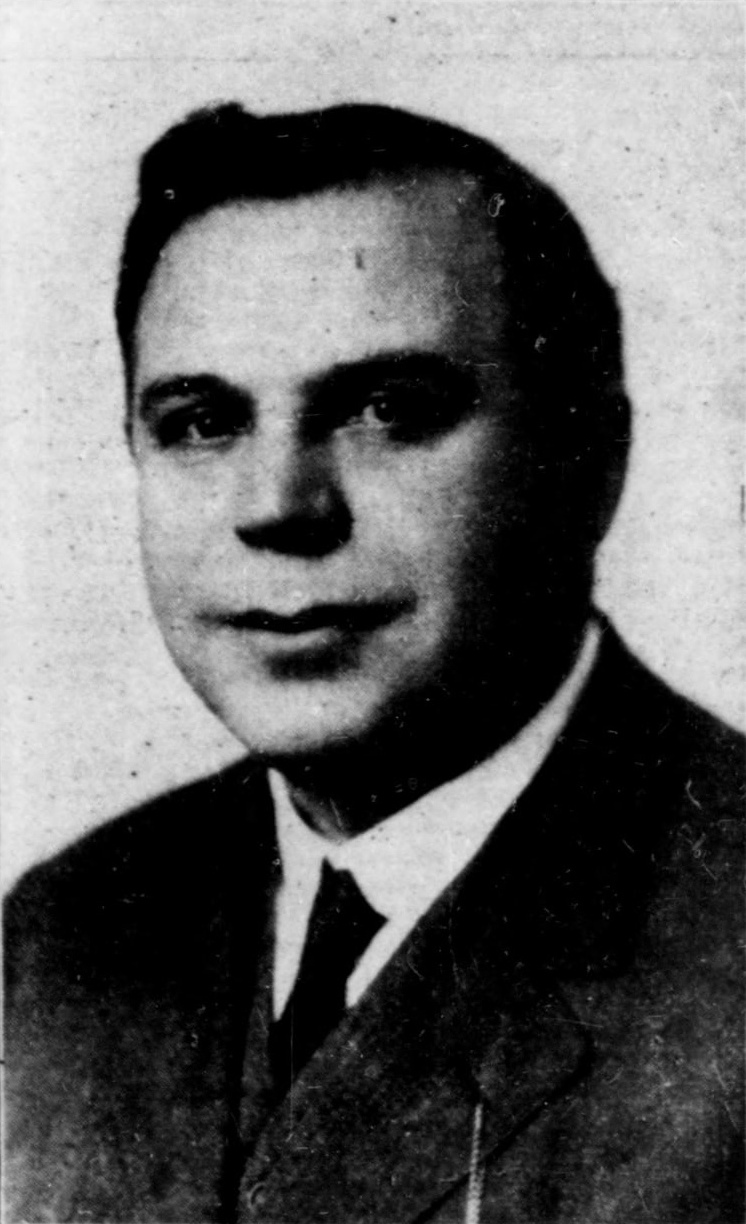
Nat D. Mann

Nathaniel D. Mann (1866–1915) was an American composer best known for his work with L. Frank Baum. He composed at least two songs with Baum, "Different Ways of Making Love" and "It Happens Ev'ry Day," and another with John Slavin, "She Didn't Really Mind the Thing at All," for The Wizard of Oz stage musical in 1902, and in 1908, composed the first original film score (27 cues) for The Fairylogue and Radio-Plays, one of the earliest feature-length fiction films (and the earliest film adaptations of the novels The Wonderful Wizard of Oz, The Marvelous Land of Oz, Ozma of Oz, John Dough and the Cherub, and Dorothy and the Wizard in Oz, presented by Baum himself), which debuted September 24, 1908. With Baum, he also composed the musical The King of Gee-Whiz (dated February 23, 1905), which went through various titles such as Montezuma (November 1902), King Jonah XIII (September 1903), and The Son of the Sun (1905). This was collaboration with and based on a novel by Emerson Hough, which was never completed and the extant scenario published in 1969.

His other works The Mayor of Tokio with William Frederick Peters (1905), The Alaskan with R. F. Carroll (1909), Imam : A Mohammedan Serenade (1912), and the one-act ballet, La Naissance de la Rose (Opus 52) (1914). He also contributed one song, "My Sulu Lulu Loo", to the operetta The Sultan of Sulu (1902) whose score was written by Alfred G. Wathall and its libretto by George Ade. For the singer Christie MacDonald he wrote the song "Moon, Moon," which she sang in The Toreador (1902). Much of his work consisted of coon songs.

He was a brother of actors Louis Mann and Sam Mann. He died in San Francisco on April 12, 1915.

== Published Songs ==
- "What Right has he on Broadway?" March song and chorus. Words by Harry Dillon, M. Witmark & Sons, 1895.
- "Climb de Golden Fence : (oh my! wicked piccaninny)", lyrics by Hattie Starr, M. Witmark & Sons, 1895, interpolated into a production of C.W. Taylor's 1852 stage adaptation of Uncle Tom's Cabin.
- "The Niagara": Respectfully dedicated to Nova A. Lanham, published by M. Witmark & Sons, 1896.
- "Katy - did, she did". lyrics by Roy L'McArdell
- "You would like to hug and kiss (Res-te-la)" words by Edgar Smith, from The Girl from Paris (1897)
- "I'm a Gwine to Save yo' Soul : Salvation song", lyrics by Edward S. Abeles, 1897.
- "Honey! You'se ma Lady Love: A Coonlet Courtship." sung by Maxwell & Simpson, M. Witmark & Sons, 1897.
- "Open Your Mouth and Shut Your Eyes." (1898)
- "Jean, Jane, Jennie, Jeannette : Chansonette" (1901)
- "Thoughts of Love (Pense d'Amour) : Valse Sentimental" M. Witmark & Sons, 1903.
- "Just to Remind You," lyrics by Alfred Anderson, 1908, sung by Manuel Romain on Edison Records.
- "In the Same Old Way," V. Kremer, 1910.
- "My Little 'Lasses Candy Coon : Mammy's Sweetness" (Witmark) (recorded on the album Mobile Minstrels from Victor in 1913)
- "That Old Quartet," lyrics by Ring Lardner, Jos. W. Stern & Co., 1913
