= Golden Age of Indiana Literature =

Time period of 1880–1920

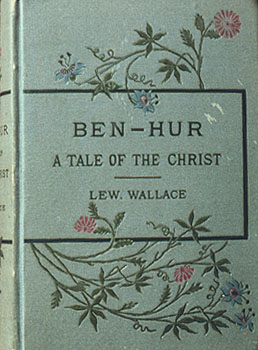
First edition cover of Ben Hur, 1880

The Golden Age of Indiana Literature is a period from 1880 to 1920 when many nationally and internationally acclaimed literary works were created by natives of the state of Indiana. During this time, many of the United States' most popular authors came from Indiana. Maurice Thompson, George Ade, Booth Tarkington, Theodore Dreiser, Edward Eggleston, Frank McKinney Hubbard, George Barr McCutcheon, Meredith Nicholson, Gene Stratton Porter, Lew Wallace, and James Whitcomb Riley were foremost among the Hoosier authors.

Wallace's Ben Hur: A Tale of the Christ became the best-selling book of the 19th century, and Riley became the most prominent poet of the age, writing poems that included "Little Orphant Annie". Tarkington, Thompson, and Nicholson each wrote several best-selling novels, including The Gentleman from Indiana (Tarkington), Alice of Old Vincennes (Thompson), and The House of a Thousand Candles (Nicholson).

Ade, a writer, syndicated newspaper columnist, and playwright, is best known for his use of street language and slang to describe urban life in "Stories of the Streets and of the Town", his newspaper column for the Chicago Record, and his fables in slang, humorous stories that featured vernacular speech and the liberal use of capitalization. Ade's fables were published in his syndicated newspaper column, in magazines, and as a series of books, which earned him the nickname of the "Aesop of Indiana". Ade also wrote several plays produced for the Broadway stage from 1900 to 1910, including The County Chairman (1903) and The College Widow (1904), his best-known theatrical works, which were adapted into motion pictures. He also wrote other film scripts and one-act plays.

Stratton-Porter was a best-selling novelist and author of nature studies, poetry, short stories, and children's books. A Girl of the Limberlost (1909) remains her best-known work. Stratton-Porter was also a columnist for national magazines such as McCall's and Good Housekeeping. Eight of her novels have been adapted into motion pictures.

The period corresponded to growth in other cultural areas including the creation of the Hoosier Group of landscape painters, and prominence of Indiana music composers like Paul Dresser. During the decades of the age, Indiana ranked second among states in the production of best-selling books.
