= Charles J. Stine =

American actor

Charles Jacob Stine (19 August 1864 – 5 January 1934) was an American silent film actor.

Charles J. Stine was born on 19 August 1864 in Freeport, Illinois.

After a long stage career starting in 1878, Stine began acting with Essanay Studios in Chicago in 1913. The short films in which he appeared include The Fable of the Roistering Blades (1915) written by George Ade and starring Wallace Beery.

Stine died on 5 January 1934 in Bay Shore, Long Island, New York.

== Partial filmography ==
- The Ups and Downs (1914) with Wallace Beery
- His New Job (1915) with Charles Chaplin and Gloria Swanson (uncredited)
- The Fable of the Roistering Blades (1915) with Wallace Beery
- Captain Jinks of the Horse Marines (1916)
- The Misleading Lady (1916)
