= George Ade House =

Historic house in Indiana, United States

- U.S. National Register of Historic Places
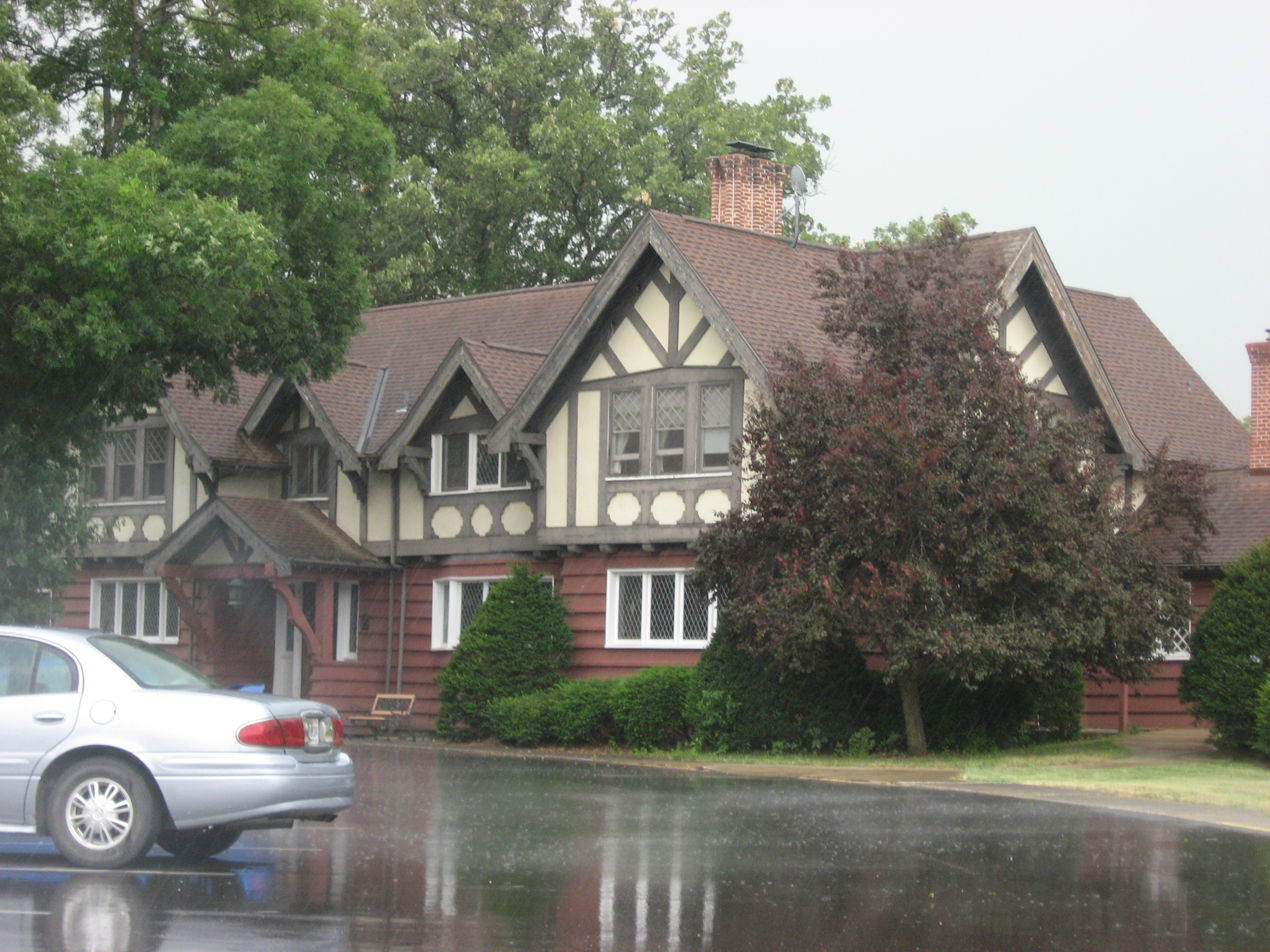
- George Ade House, June 2012

- Location within Indiana Location within the United States
- Location: East of Brook off State Road 16, Iroquois Township, Newton County, Indiana
- Coordinates: 40°51′50″N 87°19′21″W
- Area: 1 acre (0.40 ha)
- Built: 1904
- Architect: Mann, Billy
- Architectural style: Tudor Revival
- NRHP reference No.: 76000014
- Added to NRHP: September 27, 1976

George Ade House, also known as Hazelden, is a two-story, fourteen-room, Tudor Revival-style home in Iroquois Township, Newton County, Indiana. Chicago architect Billie Mann designed the frame dwelling, built in 1904, George Ade (1866–1944), a syndicated newspaper columnist, author, humorist, and playwright. Ade named the property Hazelden, after his English grandparents' home.

== History ==
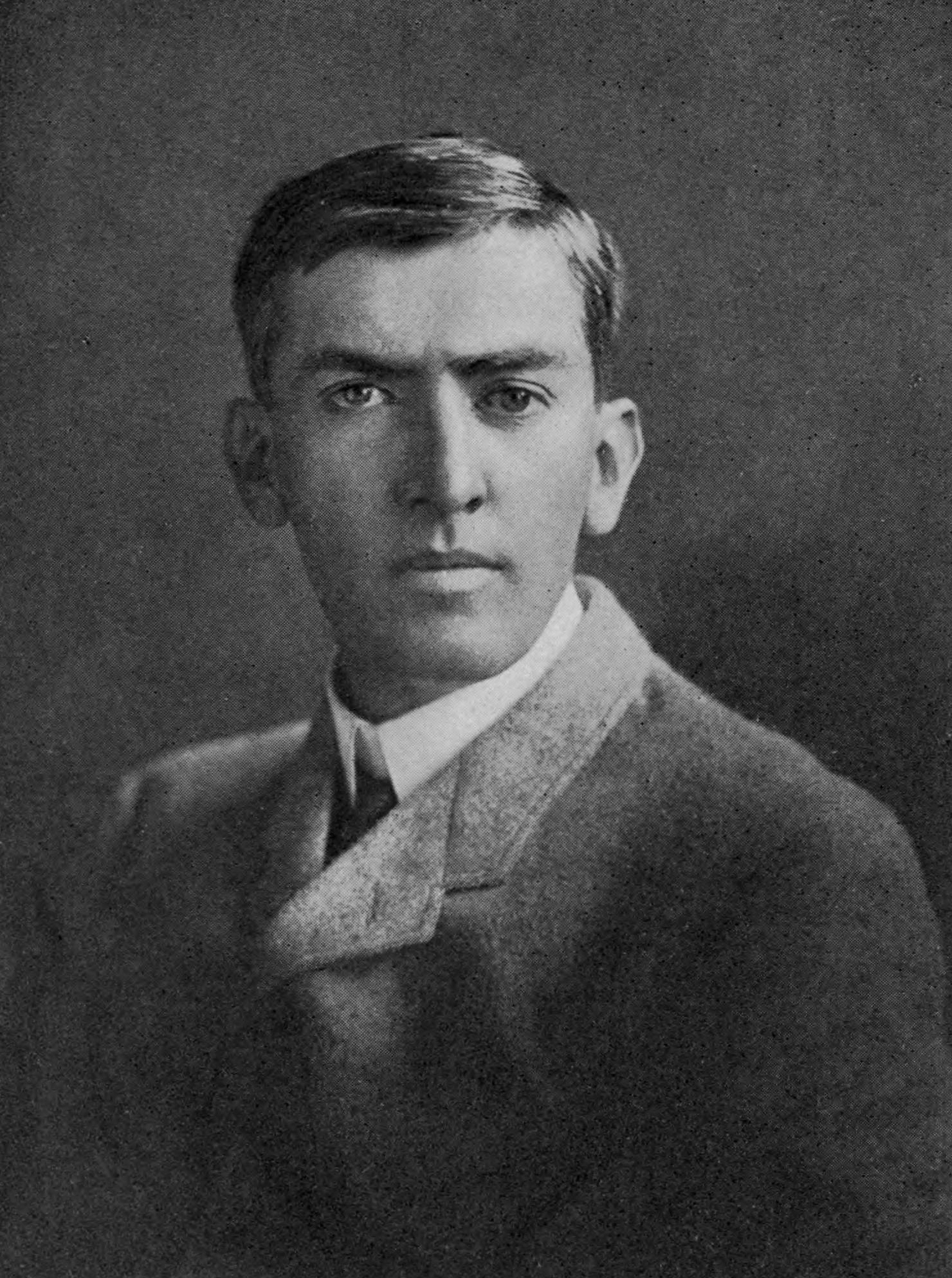
George Ade, 1903

By the early 1900s, after twelve years of working as a newspaper reporter and columnist in Chicago, Illinois, George Ade (1866–1944) decided to return to Indiana and retire to a life in the country. Ade was born and raised in Kentland, another farming community in Newton County, Indiana. He gained national notoriety as a newspaper columnist writing "Stories of the Streets and of the Town" for the Chicago Daily News (which later became the Chicago Morning News and the Chicago Record) at the turn of the twentieth century. Collections of articles from his columns were also published as books. In addition, Ade wrote a syndicated weekly newspaper column and a book series of fables in slang, which were humorous stories that featured vernacular speech and the liberal use of capitalization. Ade was also a playwright for the Broadway stage whose best-known plays, The County Chairman and The College Widow, and some of his other literary works were adapted into motion pictures. Using the earnings from his writing career, Ade invested in Newton County, Indiana, farmland, eventually owning about 2,400 acres (970 hectares).

In 1902, William Ade (George's brother) purchased on George's behalf a 417-acre (169-hectare) site of wooded land along the Iroquois River near the town of Brook in Newton County, Indiana. Ade named the property Hazelden, after his English grandparents' home, and had a two-story, fourteen-room home built on the site. He moved from Chicago into the newly built residence in 1904 and owned the home for the remainder of his life.

Following Ade's death in 1944, ownership of Hazelden was transferred to Purdue University (Ade's alma mater). The university relinquished the property to the State of Indiana when it could no longer afford its upkeep. The state government, also unable to maintain the home, turned it over to Newton County, Indiana, officials. In 1962, the George Ade Memorial Association raised funds to acquire, renovate, and restore the home, which was listed on the National Register of Historic Places in 1976.

== Description ==
Ade initially planned to build a summer cottage, but Chicago architect Billie Mann, one of Ade's Sigma Chi fraternity brothers, designed a country manor for the site. Ade's two-story, fourteen-room, Tudor Revival-style home was constructed in 1904 at an estimated cost of US$25,000. The frame dwelling features half-timbering and stucco on the upper floor, leaded glass windows, and beamed and vaulted ceilings. Ade made additional improvements to property that included landscaped grounds, a swimming pool, greenhouse, barn, and caretaker's cottage, among other outbuildings. He also added an adjacent golf course and country club in 1910.

== Use ==
Ade frequently entertained at Hazelden, where he usually spent the summers, and vacationed during the winter months at a rented home in Miami, Florida. He was also a world traveler. In addition to serving as his summer home, and his permanent residence beginning in 1905, Hazelden was used for political gatherings and community events. In 1908, William Howard Taft announced his candidacy for president of the United States at Hazelden. In 1912, Hazelden was the site of a political rally for Theodore Roosevelt's Bull Moose Party, and, in 1924, it served as a venue for an address from vice presidential candidate Charles W. Dawes. Ade also hosted a homecoming party for soldiers and sailors on July 4, 1919, as well as parties and gatherings for the community, local children, alumni of Purdue University, his Sigma Chi fraternity brothers, members of the Indiana Society of Chicago, and golf tournaments.

The George Ade Memorial Association, the group that raised funds to acquire and renovate the home, disbanded in 2018. As of 2019, Newton county officials are assessing the home's condition and plans for restoring it for use as a historic site open to the public and an events venue.
