= The Ups and Downs (1914 film) =

1914 film

- Produced by: Essanay Film Manufacturing Company
- Starring: Wallace Beery; Charles J. Stine
- Production company: Essanay Film Manufacturing Company
- Distributed by: General Film Company
- Release date: 1914
- Country: United States
- Languages: Silent; English intertitles

The Ups and Downs is a 1914 American silent Western film starring Wallace Beery and Charles J. Stine. The silent short was produced by the Essanay Film Manufacturing Company and distributed by the General Film Company.

== Cast ==
- Wallace Beery
- Charles J. Stine
