= The Fable of the Roistering Blades =

1915 short film by Richard Foster Baker

The Fable of the Roistering Blades is a 1915 short film directed by Richard Foster Baker, based upon a story by George Ade, and starring Wallace Beery and Charles J. Stine. The silent short was produced by the Essanay Film Manufacturing Company and distributed by the General Film Company. Beery was thirty years old at the time of filming.

== Cast ==
- Wallace Beery as Milt
- Charles J. Stine as Henry
