= The Fable of the Busy Business Boy and the Droppers-In =

1914 short film by George Ade

The Fable of the Busy Business Boy and the Droppers-In is a 1914 short film directed by George Ade and starring Wallace Beery, produced by the Essanay Film Manufacturing Company. The director, Ade, a popular writer, at the time of the production was working actively with the Essanay company.
