= Arthur W. Bates =

American actor (1883–1972)

Arthur W. Bates (1883 – August 16, 1972) was an American silent film actor.

He was born in 1883 in Chicago, Illinois. He was acting with Essanay Studios in Chicago by 1915. After the studio closed down, he worked for the Chicago Transit Authority.

Bates died in Chicago on August 16, 1972.

== Partial filmography ==
- His New Job (1915)
- The Alster Case (1915)
- The Strange Case of Mary Page (1916)
- The Phantom Buccaneer (1916)
- Uneasy Money (1918)
