= Brook, Indiana =

- Town
- Town of Brook
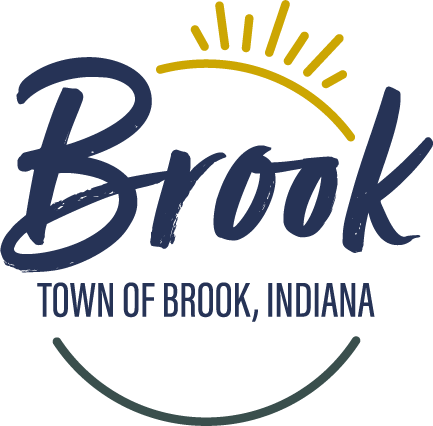
- Logo

- Location of Brook in Newton County, Indiana.
- Coordinates: 40°51′59″N 87°21′49″W
- Country: United States
- State: Indiana
- County: Newton
- Township: Iroquois

Area
  - Total: 0.69 sq mi (1.78 km^{2})
  - Land: 0.68 sq mi (1.75 km^{2})
  - Water: 0.0077 sq mi (0.02 km^{2})
- Elevation: 653 ft (199 m)

Population (2020)
  - Total: 939
  - Density: 1,386.3/sq mi (535.24/km^{2})
- Time zone: UTC-6 (Central (CST))
  - Summer (DST): UTC-5 (CDT)
- ZIP code: 47922
- Area code: 219
- FIPS code: 18-07966
- GNIS ID: 431563
- Website: townofbrook.in.gov

Brook is a town in Iroquois Township, Newton County, in the U.S. state of Indiana. As of the 2020 census, Brook had a population of 939.

== History ==
Brook was laid out in 1866. A post office has been in operation at the town since 1859.

The George Ade House was listed on the National Register of Historic Places in 1976.

== Geography ==
Brook is located in northwestern Indiana, on State Route 16, about 6 miles (9.7 km) west of Interstate 65.

According to the 2010 census, Brook has a total area of 0.67 square miles (1.74 km^{2}), of which 0.66 square miles (1.71 km^{2}) (or 98.51%) is land and 0.01 square miles (0.03 km^{2}) (or 1.49%) is water.

== Demographics ==
Historical population
| Census | Pop. | Note | %± |
|---|---|---|---|
| 1900 | 677 | | — |
| 1910 | 1,067 | | 57.6% |
| 1920 | 975 | | −8.6% |
| 1930 | 815 | | −16.4% |
| 1940 | 888 | | 9.0% |
| 1950 | 915 | | 3.0% |
| 1960 | 845 | | −7.7% |
| 1970 | 919 | | 8.8% |
| 1980 | 926 | | 0.8% |
| 1990 | 899 | | −2.9% |
| 2000 | 1,062 | | 18.1% |
| 2010 | 997 | | −6.1% |
| 2020 | 939 | | −5.8% |
U.S. Decennial Census

=== 2010 census ===
As of the 2010 census, there were 997 people, 383 households, and 274 families living in the town. The population density was 1,510.6 inhabitants per square mile (583.2/km^{2}). There were 422 housing units at an average density of 639.4 per square mile (246.9/km^{2}). The racial makeup of the town was 92.1% White, 0.1% African American, 0.7% Native American, 0.2% Asian, 0.2% Pacific Islander, 5.9% from other races, and 0.8% from two or more races. Hispanic or Latino of any race were 10.0% of the population.

There were 383 households, of which 34.5% had children under the age of 18 living with them, 53.3% were married couples living together, 11.0% had a female householder with no husband present, 7.3% had a male householder with no wife present, and 28.5% were non-families. 25.1% of all households were made up of individuals, and 13.6% had someone living alone who was 65 years of age or older. The average household size was 2.60 and the average family size was 3.05.

The median age in the town was 40.5 years. 24.8% of residents were under the age of 18; 7.3% were between the ages of 18 and 24; 24.6% were from 25 to 44; 25.9% were from 45 to 64; and 17.2% were 65 years of age or older. The gender makeup of the town was 48.4% male and 51.6% female.

=== 2000 census ===
As of the 2000 census, there were 1,062 people, 397 households, and 292 families living in the town. The population density was 1,607.2 inhabitants per square mile (620.5/km^{2}). There were 423 housing units at an average density of 640.2 per square mile (247.2/km^{2}). The racial makeup of the town was 96.05% White, 0.28% African American, 0.19% Native American, 2.92% from other races, and 0.56% from two or more races. Hispanic or Latino of any race were 8.66% of the population.

There were 397 households, out of which 34.8% had children under the age of 18 living with them, 58.2% were married couples living together, 10.6% had a female householder with no husband present, and 26.2% were non-families. 21.4% of all households were made up of individuals, and 12.1% had someone living alone who was 65 years of age or older. The average household size was 2.68 and the average family size was 3.09.

In the town, the population was spread out, with 28.8% under the age of 18, 8.5% from 18 to 24, 27.5% from 25 to 44, 22.2% from 45 to 64, and 13.0% who were 65 years of age or older. The median age was 34 years. For every 100 females, there were 91.0 males. For every 100 females age 18 and over, there were 91.9 males.

The median income for a household in the town was $34,881, and the median income for a family was $38,958. Males had a median income of $31,339 versus $18,750 for females. The per capita income for the town was $14,826. About 4.6% of families and 7.9% of the population were living below the poverty line, including 12.1% of those under the age of 18 and 8.7% of those ages 65 and older.

== Culture ==
The Iroquois Conservation Club hosts an annual fishing contest for children under the age of 16 and their parents.

== Education ==
Grades kindergarten through 12 attend South Newton Schools in Kentland.

The town has a lending library, the Brook-Iroquois Township Public Library .

== Notable people ==
- George Ade, journalist and writer
- Don R. Berlin, aircraft design engineer
- Warren T. McCray, 30th Governor of Indiana
- Lester Spangler, Indy car driver
