= David Edward Ross =

David Edward Ross (August 25, 1871 – June 28, 1943) was a Purdue University graduate who helped advance the university through his generous donations and years of service on the board of trustees.

== Early life ==
David E. Ross was the second child of George Ross and Susanna Booth. He was born in Lafayette, Indiana, but moved to Brookston at the age of two. In 1876, Ross began attending primary school.

During this time in his life, Ross began to show an interest in engineering. While on a steamboat ride with his parents, Ross made his way to the engine room and became fascinated with the machinery. Another incident occurred at his uncle's house when Ross attempted to manipulate the furnace.

During his senior year of high school, Ross decided to attend college and learn about engineering. Despite his father's disapproval, Ross enrolled in Purdue University in 1889. This decision was made possible thanks to another uncle, Will, who offered to house Ross during his time in college and pay for books and tuition.

== College ==
In 1893, Ross graduated from Purdue as a mechanical engineer. His life at college was “quiet”. Despite his inventive mind, he received only a passing grade in most of his classes, including machine design, mathematics, and physics.

== Life after college ==
Around 1905, Ross invented his first automotive steering gear. He eventually patented 88 inventions and was involved in founding four companies related to building materials and automotive mechanisms.

=== Purdue University ===
Ross became a member of the Purdue Alumni Committee in 1921. His first project involved raising money to build the Purdue Memorial Union that would honor Purdue graduates that died during World War I. After donating a large contribution of his own, Ross began persuading alumni in the area to donate as well. He would promise them the building would be “the finest thing of the kind in the United States”. Partially because of his persistence, alumni donated almost half of the one million dollars that paid for the Union.

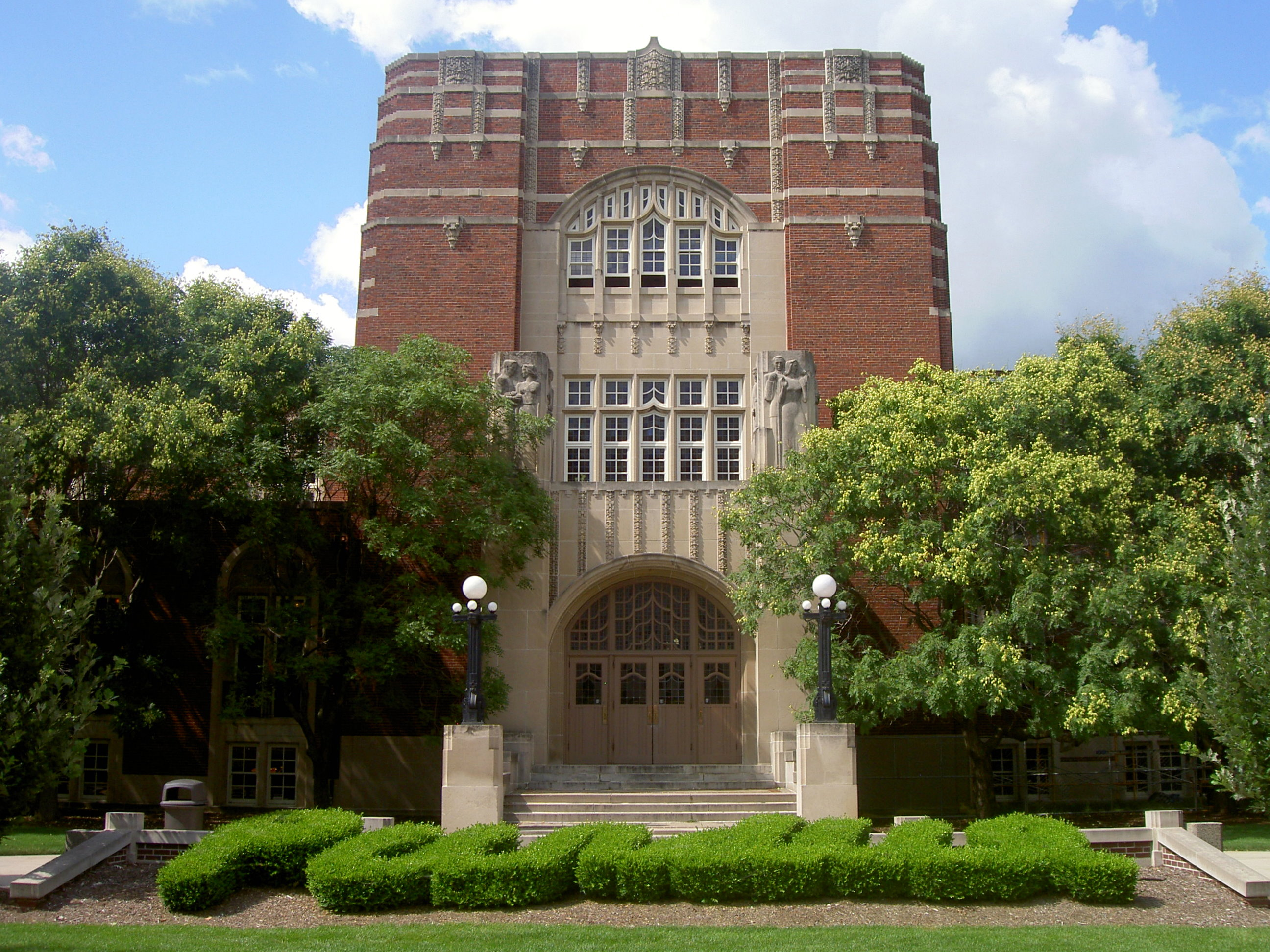
Purdue Memorial Union

Ross's next project was the design of a new football stadium to help promote the athletics of the school. He met with George Ade, another well-known Purdue graduate, on a 65-acre farm and proposed the financing of the new stadium. The two men became business partners and friends, and funded what came to be called the Ross–Ade Stadium. Ross also helped build the Lambert Fieldhouse by donating $100,000 and land.

Ross became president of the Purdue Board of Trustees in 1927. With his new role, he was able to push for the creation of the Purdue Research Foundation, which was successfully founded in 1930. He personally donated $25,000 towards its formation. He believed research was an essential part of the learning process and led to innovation and discovery. This belief in the power of research led to $453,00 of fellowship funds from 1930 to 1940.

Ross was also a believer in the need for aeronautical engineering at Purdue. He bought 157 acres of land that would eventually grant Purdue the distinction of having one of the country's first operational airports.

== Later life ==
=== Death ===
Ross died on June 28, 1943. He is buried northwest of the Slayter Center of Performing Arts, on a piece of land overlooking the main campus of Purdue University that he had donated as part of the Purdue Research Foundation. He is one of four people buried on campus, the others being John Purdue, and Steven and Jane Beering. Ross was quoted as saying "I'm hoping the time may never come when I'm not identified with Purdue".

Most of Ross's estate was left to the Purdue Research Foundation. The sum total of money, stocks, and land that Ross donated to the university amounted to nearly $3,000,000.
