= His New Job =

1915 film by Charlie Chaplin

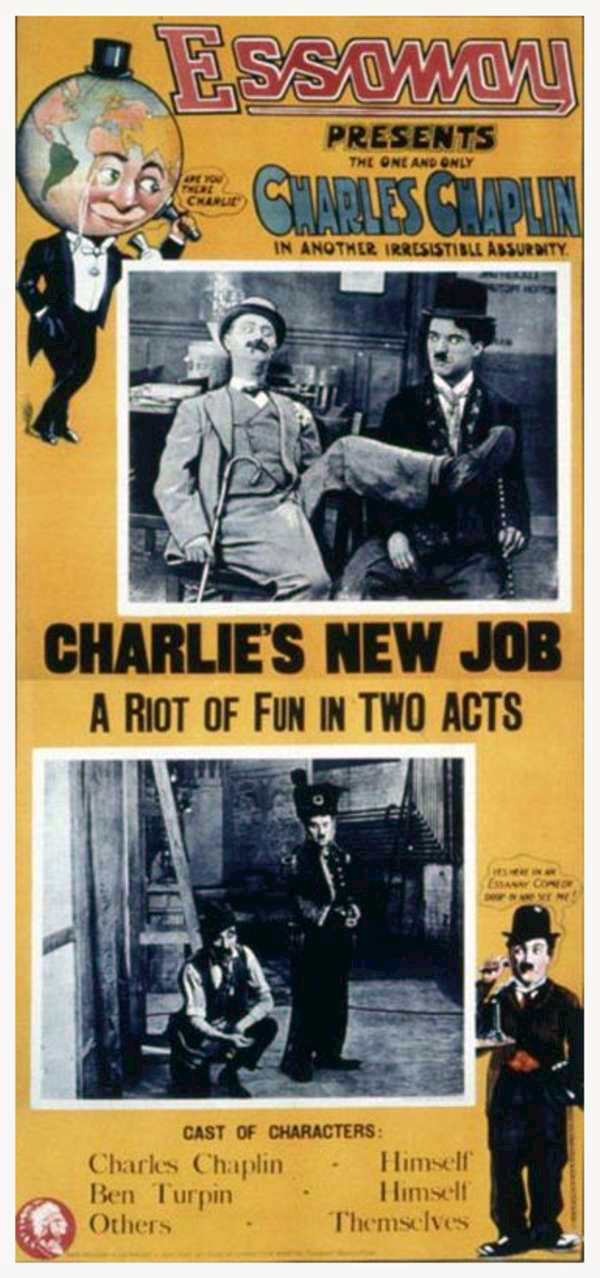
- Theatrical release poster
- Directed by: Charlie Chaplin
- Written by: Charlie Chaplin; Louella Parsons
- Produced by: Jess Robbins
- Starring: Charlie Chaplin; Ben Turpin; Charlotte Mineau; Leo White; Robert Bolder; Charles J. Stine; Arthur W. Bates; Jess Robbins
- Edited by: Bret Hampton; Charlie Chaplin
- Distributed by: Essanay Studios
- Release date: February 1, 1915
- Running time: 32 minutes
- Country: United States
- Language: Silent (English intertitles)

His New Job

His New Job is a 1915 American short silent comedy film written by, directed by, and starring Charlie Chaplin. Gloria Swanson appears as an uncredited extra. The title is an inside reference to this being Chaplin's first film after leaving Keystone Studios for Essanay Studios. It was also the only film Chaplin shot at Essanay's Chicago studio. He found the facilities and climate (His New Job was shot in mid-winter) not to his liking, and Chaplin soon relocated back to California.

== Plot ==
Charlie sits in an audition queue for Lodestone Motion Picture Co. The girl next to him is interviewed first and gets a contract immediately. A strange looking man enters and jumps the queue for the next interview. A further man enters and they fight over who is next.

Charlie twice walks onto set while they are filming. The director sends him to work with the carpenter. In the props store he becomes obsessed by a classical female statue.

When one of the actors playing a Prussian officer in full uniform is fired, Charlie is asked to replace the actor. Charlie dons a somewhat less elegant uniform and is on his way to the set when he is distracted by the carpenter playing dice. They start gambling.

When he finally gets to act, he ruins his scene, accidentally destroys the set, and uses the skirt of the star of the movie to wipe his face.

== Cast ==
- Charlie Chaplin as Film Extra
- Ben Turpin as His squint rival
- Charlotte Mineau as The Leading Lady (the Filmstar)
- Tom Nelson as the Star
- Leo White as Actor, Hussar Officer / Studio Clerk
- Robert Bolder as Studio President
- Charles J. Stine as Director
- Arthur W. Bates as Carpenter
- Jess Robbins as Cameraman
- Agnes Ayres as Extra, Secretary (uncredited)
- Gloria Swanson as Extra, Stenographer (uncredited)
- Billy Armstrong as Film Extra (uncredited)

== Production ==
The movie's title, His New Job, had a subtle second meaning, as it was Chaplin's first film for Essanay after his contract with Keystone Studios expired at the end of 1914. The use of the name "Lockstone" for the silent film studio was an obvious humorous jab by Chaplin directed at Keystone.

The movie was filmed at Essanay's Chicago studio in the dead of winter in January 1915. Chaplin found the city's frigid weather so objectionable that he quickly relocated his operations to balmy southern California.

This was the first Chaplin film to be photographed by Rollie Totheroh who began a remarkable 40-year working association with Chaplin.

A young Gloria Swanson—she was not quite 16 years old—appears in the background as a stenographer. She received no screen credit for this part.

== Review ==
A reviewer for the motion picture trade publication Biograph glowingly wrote, "There is probably no film comedian in the world more popular with the average picture theater audience than that famous fun-maker Charles Chaplin, whose services have recently been secured by the Essanay Company. The art of Charles Chaplin defies analysis and disarms the critic. Just why he is so funny, it is almost impossible to say, and very probably he could not tell you himself. He possesses a naturally comic personality and its humor is accentuated by the originality of the innumerable bits of 'business,' with which his work is so profoundly interspersed. Scarcely a moment passes while he is on the screen, but he is up to some wild piece of mischief or committing some ludicrous folly."

== Preservation ==
A print of the film is preserved at the George Eastman House and is now in the public domain.
