= Foresman, Indiana =

- Unincorporated community
- Location within Indiana Location within the United States
- Coordinates: 40°51′58″N 87°17′42″W
- Country: United States
- State: Indiana
- County: Newton
- Township: Iroquois
- Elevation: 653 ft (199 m)
- Time zone: UTC-6 (Central (CST))
  - Summer (DST): UTC-5 (CDT)
- ZIP code: 47922
- Area code: 219
- FIPS code: 18-23890
- GNIS feature ID: 434645

Foresman is an unincorporated community in Iroquois Township, Newton County, in the U.S. state of Indiana.

== History ==
Foresman was laid out as a town in 1882 by John B. Foresman, and named for him. A post office was established at Foresman in 1883, and remained in operation until it was discontinued in 1934.
