= Meredith Nicholson =

American author and politician

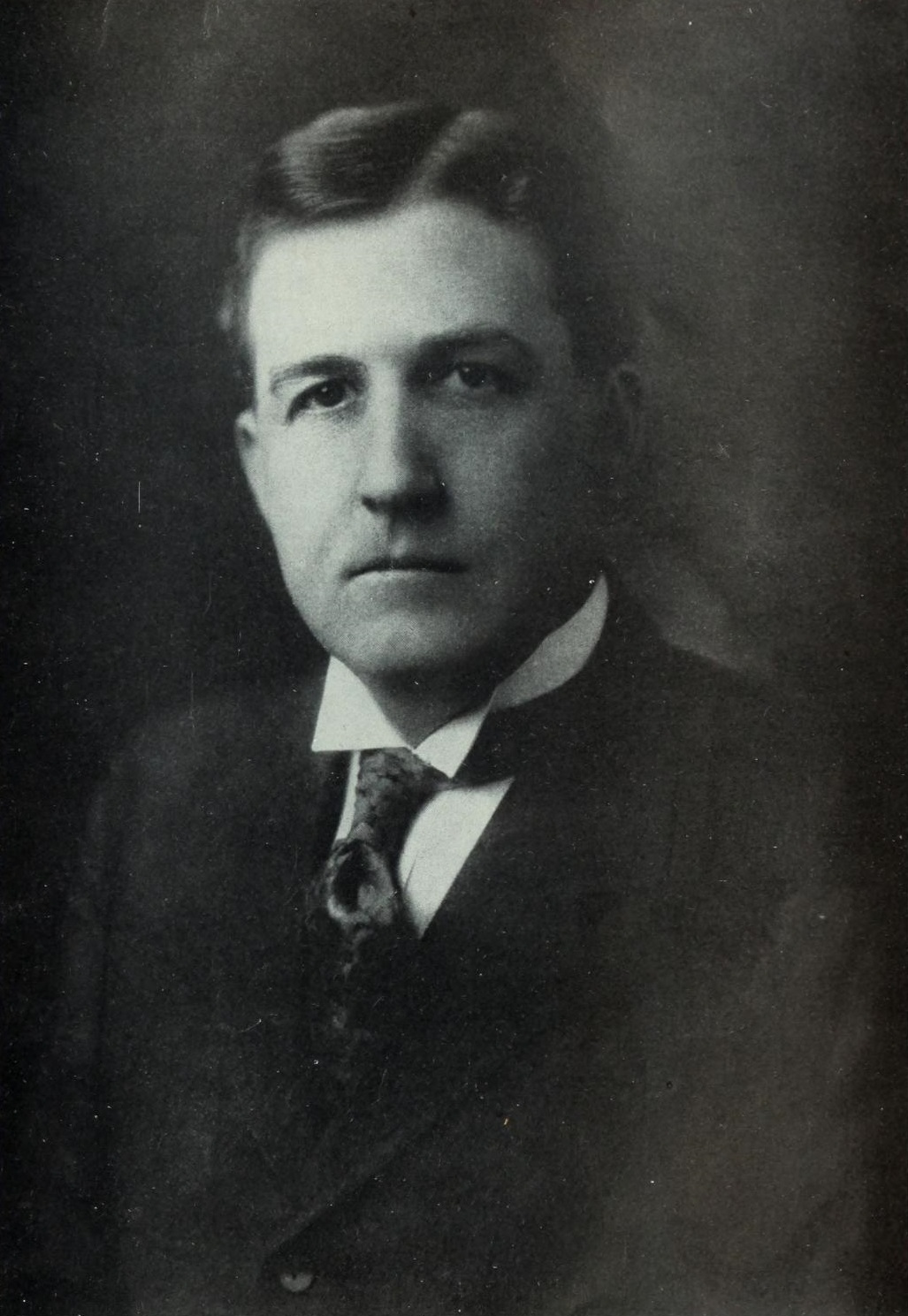

United States Minister to Nicaragua
- In office June 9, 1938 – February 27, 1941
- President: Franklin D. Roosevelt
- Preceded by: Boaz Long
- Succeeded by: Pierre de Lagarde Boal

United States Minister to Venezuela
- In office April 22, 1935 – April 14, 1938
- President: Franklin D. Roosevelt
- Preceded by: George T. Summerlin
- Succeeded by: Antonio C. Gonzalez

United States Minister to Paraguay
- In office October 30, 1933 – February 3, 1935
- President: Franklin D. Roosevelt
- Preceded by: Post Wheeler
- Succeeded by: Findley Burtch Howard

Personal details
- Born: December 9, 1866 Crawfordsville, Indiana
- Died: December 21, 1947 (aged 81) Indianapolis, Indiana
- Resting place: Crown Hill Cemetery and Arboretum, Section 4, Lot 6; 38.8364098°N 86.1746174°W
- Party: Democratic

Meredith Nicholson (December 9, 1866 – December 21, 1947) was American writer, politician, and diplomat.

== Biography ==
Nicholson was born on December 9, 1866, in Crawfordsville, Indiana, to Edward Willis Nicholson and the former Emily Meredith. Largely self-taught, Nicholson began a newspaper career in 1884 at the Indianapolis Sentinel. He moved to the Indianapolis News the following year, where he remained until 1897.

He wrote Short Flights in 1891, and continued to publish extensively, both poetry and prose until 1928. During the first quarter of the 20th century, Nicholson, along with Booth Tarkington, George Ade, and James Whitcomb Riley helped to create a Golden Age of literature in Indiana. Three of his books from that era were national bestsellers: The House of a Thousand Candles (#4 in 1906), The Port of Missing Men (#3 in 1907), and A Hoosier Chronicle (#5 in 1912).

In 1928, Nicholson entered Democratic party politics, and served for two years as a city councillor in Indianapolis. He rose through the ranks of the Democratic party and was rewarded with appointments as envoy to Paraguay, Venezuela, and Nicaragua.

Nicholson was married first to Eugenie Clementine Kountze, daughter of Herman Kountze, and then to Dorothy Wolfe Lannon, whom he later divorced.

Nicholson died on December 21, 1947, in Indianapolis, aged 81, and is buried in the Crown Hill Cemetery.

== Chronological bibliography ==
1891: Short Flights, The Bowen-Merrill Co.
1900: The Hoosiers, The Macmillan Company
1903: The Main Chance, The Bobbs-Merrill Company
1904: Zelda Dameron, The Bobbs-Merrill Company
1905: The House of a Thousand Candles, The Bobbs-Merrill Company
1906: Poems The Bobbs-Merrill Company
1907: The Port of Missing Men, The Bobbs-Merrill Company
......... Rosalind at Red Gate, The Bobbs-Merrill Company
1908: The Little Brown Jug at Kildare, The Bobbs-Merrill Company
1909: The Lords of High Decision, Doubleday, Page & Company
1910: The Siege of the Seven Suitors, Houghton Mifflin Company
1911: Style and the Man, The Bobbs-Merrill Company
1912: A Hoosier Chronicle, Houghton Mifflin Company
......... The Provincial American and Other Papers, Houghton Mifflin Company
1913: Otherwise Phyllis, Houghton Mifflin Company
1914: The Poet, Houghton Mifflin Company
1916: The Proof of the Pudding, Houghton Mifflin Company
1917: The Madness of May, Charles Scribner's Sons
......... A Reversible Santa Claus, Houghton Mifflin Company
1918: The Valley of Democracy, Charles Scribner's Sons
1919: Lady Larkspur, Charles Scribner's Sons
1920: Blacksheep! Blacksheep!, Charles Scribner's Sons
1921: The Man in the Street, Charles Scribner's Sons
1922: Best Laid Schemes, Charles Scribner's Sons
......... Broken Barriers, Charles Scribner's Sons
1923: Honor Bright: A Comedy in Three Acts (with Kenyon Nicholson), Samuel French
......... The Hope of Happiness, Charles Scribner's Sons
1925: And They Lived Happily Ever After!, Charles Scribner's Sons
1928: The Cavalier of Tennessee, The Bobbs-Merrill Company
1929 Old Familiar Faces, The Bobbs-Merrill Company

== Filmography ==
- The Port of Missing Men, directed by Francis Powers (1914, based on the novel The Port of Missing Men)
- The House of a Thousand Candles, directed by Thomas N. Heffron (1915, based on the novel The House of a Thousand Candles)
- Langdon's Legacy, directed by Otis Turner (1916)
- The Lords of High Decision, directed by Jack Harvey (1916, based on the novel The Lords of High Decision)
- The Hopper, directed by Thomas N. Heffron (1918, based on the short story The Hopper)
- Haunting Shadows, directed by Henry King (1919, based on the novel The House of a Thousand Candles)
- Broken Barriers, directed by Reginald Barker (1924, based on the novel Broken Barriers)
- The House of a Thousand Candles, directed by Arthur Lubin (1935, same title as the novel The House of a Thousand Candles, entirely different cast and story)
- Jack Marshall Can't Do This, produced by Screen 14 Pictures on YouTube (2017, based on the novel The House of a Thousand Candles)

== Sources ==
- "Meredith Nicholson Collection, 1890–1942, Collection Guide" (PDF). Indiana Historical Society. May 11, 2004.
- Russo, Dorothy Ritter and Sullivan, Thelma Lois. "Meredith Nicholson" (pp. 69–172) in Bibliographical studies of seven authors of Crawfordsville, Indiana, Indianapolis : Indiana Historical Society, 1952.

Diplomatic posts
Preceded by Post Wheeler	United States Minister to Paraguay; 30 October 1933–3 February 1935	Succeeded by Findley B. Howard
Preceded by George R. Summerlin	United States Minister to Venezuela; April 22, 1935 – April 14, 1938	Succeeded by Antonio C. Gonzalez
Preceded by Boaz Long	United States Minister to Nicaragua; June 9, 1938 – February 27, 1941	Succeeded by Pierre de Lagarde Boal
