= Willis P. Sweatnam =

American actor (1854–1930)

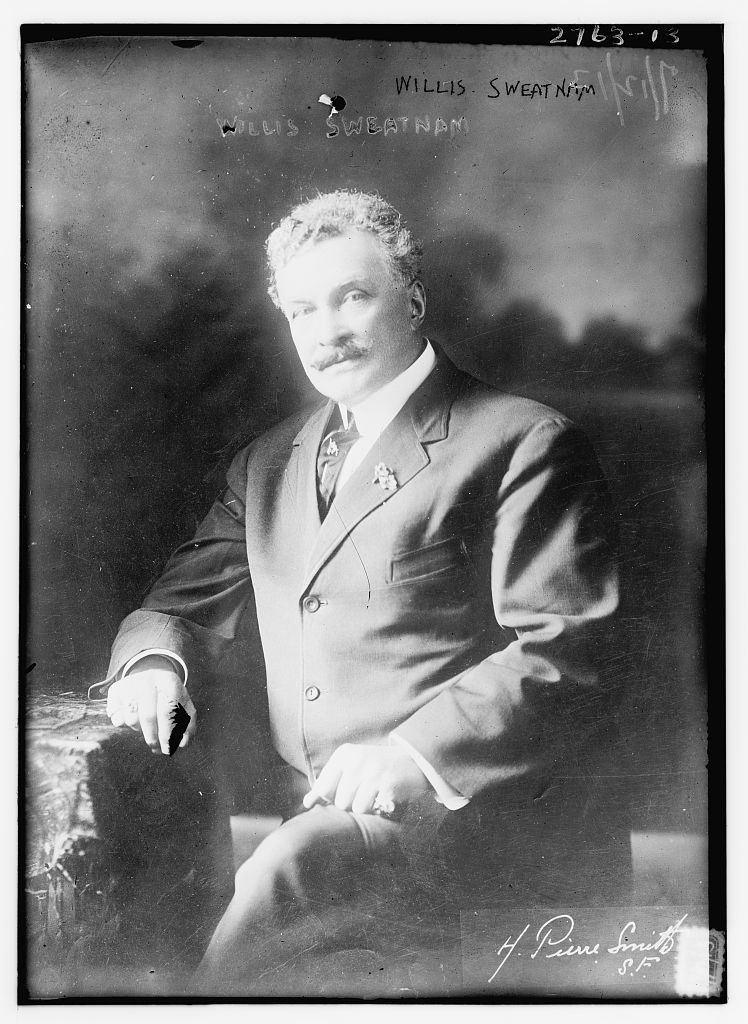
Willis P. Sweatnam

Willis Palmer Sweatnam, Sr. (1854 - November 25, 1930) was a Broadway show actor and minstrel show performer.

== Biography ==
He was born in Zanesville, Ohio, in 1854. He had a son, Willis Palmer Sweatnam, Jr. (1887-?)

When down on his luck in 1903, George Ade created a blackface role for Sweatnam in his new play The County Chairman, and Sweatnam proved to be one of the stars of the show.

He died on November 25, 1930, at the Lambs Club.
