= Iroquois Township, Newton County, Indiana =

Iroquois Township
- Township
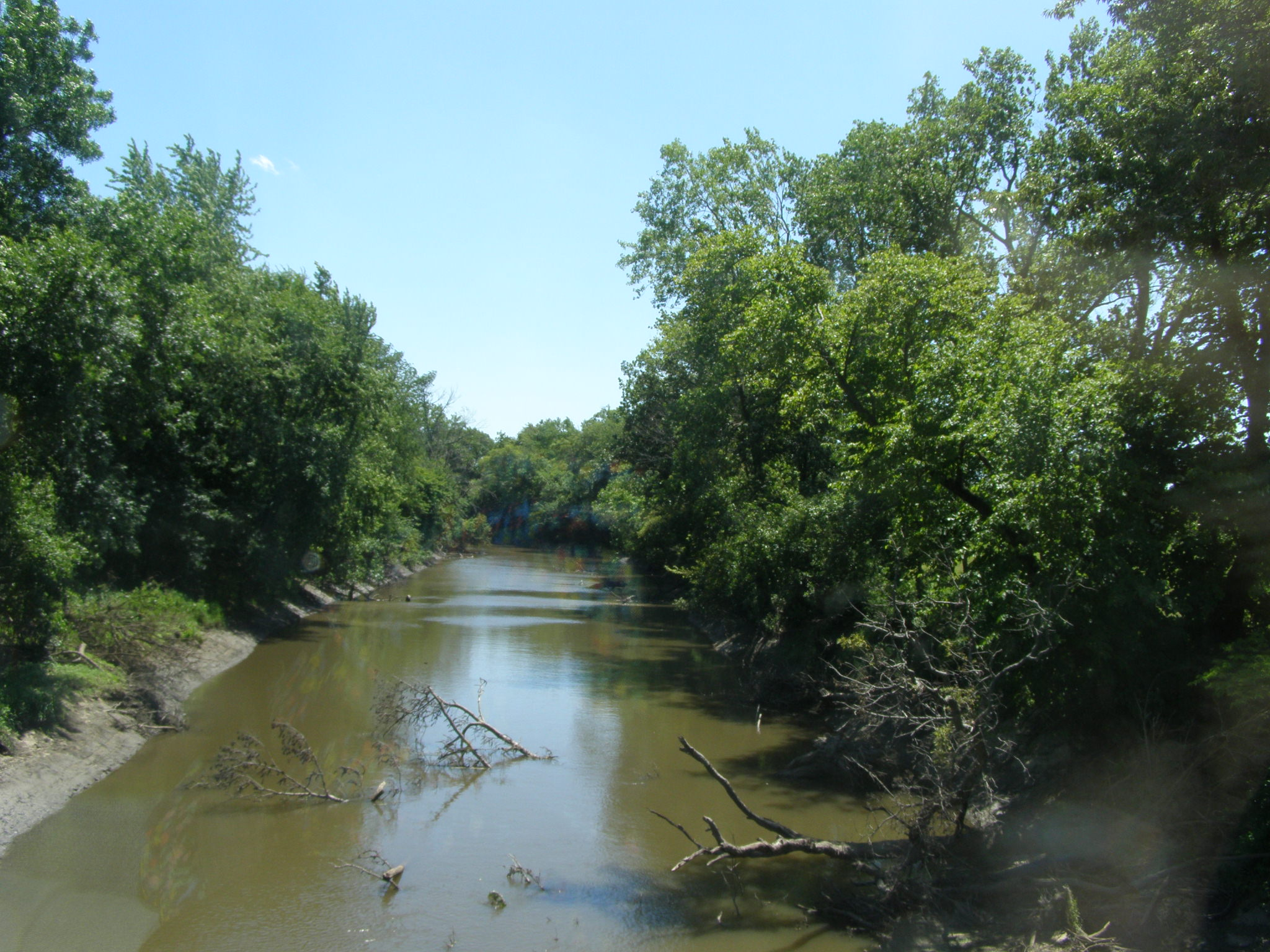
- Iroquois River in Brook, Indiana.

- Location in Newton County
- Coordinates: 40°52′09″N 87°19′41″W
- Country: United States
- State: Indiana
- County: Newton

Government
  - Type: Indiana township

Area
  - Total: 36.8 sq mi (95 km^{2})
  - Land: 36.71 sq mi (95.1 km^{2})
  - Water: 0.09 sq mi (0.23 km^{2}) 0.24%
- Elevation: 646 ft (197 m)

Population (2020)
  - Total: 1,250
  - Density: 34.1/sq mi (13.1/km^{2})
- Time zone: UTC-6 (Central (CST))
  - Summer (DST): UTC-5 (CDT)
- ZIP codes: 47922, 47948, 47951
- Area code: 219
- GNIS feature ID: 453428

Iroquois Township is one of ten townships in Newton County, Indiana, United States. As of the 2020 census, its population was 1,250 and it contained 530 housing units.

Historical population
Census	Pop.	Note	%±
1890	1,003		—
1900	1,590		58.5%
1910	1,828		15.0%
1920	1,603		−12.3%
1930	1,416		−11.7%
1940	1,482		4.7%
1950	1,463		−1.3%
1960	1,386		−5.3%
1970	1,389		0.2%
1980	1,359		−2.2%
1990	1,341		−1.3%
2000	1,428		6.5%
2010	1,358		−4.9%
2020	1,250		−8.0%
Source: US Decennial Census

== History ==
The George Ade House was listed on the National Register of Historic Places in 1976.

== Geography ==
According to the 2010 census, the township has a total area of 36.8 square miles (95 km^{2}), of which 36.71 square miles (95.1 km^{2}) (or 99.76%) is land and 0.09 square miles (0.23 km^{2}) (or 0.24%) is water.

=== Cities, towns, villages ===
- Brook

=== Unincorporated towns ===
- Foresman at 40.866149°N 87.295024°W

(This list is based on USGS data and may include former settlements.)

=== Lakes ===
- Riverside Lake

== Education ==
- South Newton School Corporation

Iroquois Township is served by the Brook-Iroquois Township Public Library.

== Political districts ==
- Indiana's 1st congressional district
- State House District 15
- State Senate District 6
