= The County Chairman (1935 film) =

1935 film by John G. Blystone

- Directed by: John G. Blystone
- Written by: Gladys Lehman; Sam Hellman
- Based on: The County Chairman by George Ade
- Produced by: Edward Butcher
- Starring: Will Rogers; Evelyn Venable; Kent Taylor; Mickey Rooney; Stepin Fetchit
- Cinematography: Hal Mohr
- Music by: Arthur Lange
- Production company: Fox Film Corporation
- Distributed by: Fox Film Corporation
- Release date: January 11, 1935
- Running time: 80 minutes
- Country: United States
- Language: English

The County Chairman is a 1935 American comedy film directed by John G. Blystone and starring Will Rogers, Evelyn Venable and Kent Taylor. It was produced and distributed by the Fox Film Corporation. It is based on the 1903 play of the same name by George Ade which had previously been adapted into a 1914 silent film The County Chairman.

== Plot ==
A political party boss in Wyoming must decide to either do what's right and lose the election or do what's wrong and win it.

== Cast ==
- Will Rogers as Jim Hackler
- Evelyn Venable as Lucy Rigby
- Kent Taylor as Ben Harvey
- Louise Dresser as Mrs. Rigby
- Mickey Rooney as Freckers
- Berton Churchill as Elias Rigby
- Frank Melton as Hy Cleaver
- Robert McWade as Tom Craden
- Russell Simpson as Vance Jimmison
- William V. Mong as Uncle Eck
- Jan Duggan as Abigail
- Gay Seabrook as Lorna Craden
- Charles Middleton as Riley Cleaver
- Erville Alderson as Wilson Prewitt
- Stepin Fetchit as Sass
- Carmencita Johnson as Schoolgirl
- Marcia Mae Jones as Schoolgirl
- Francis Ford as Cattle Rancher

== Production ==
The railroad scenes were filmed on the Sierra Railroad in Tuolumne County, California.
