= The County Chairman (1914 film) =

1914 film by Allan Dwan

The Country Chairman
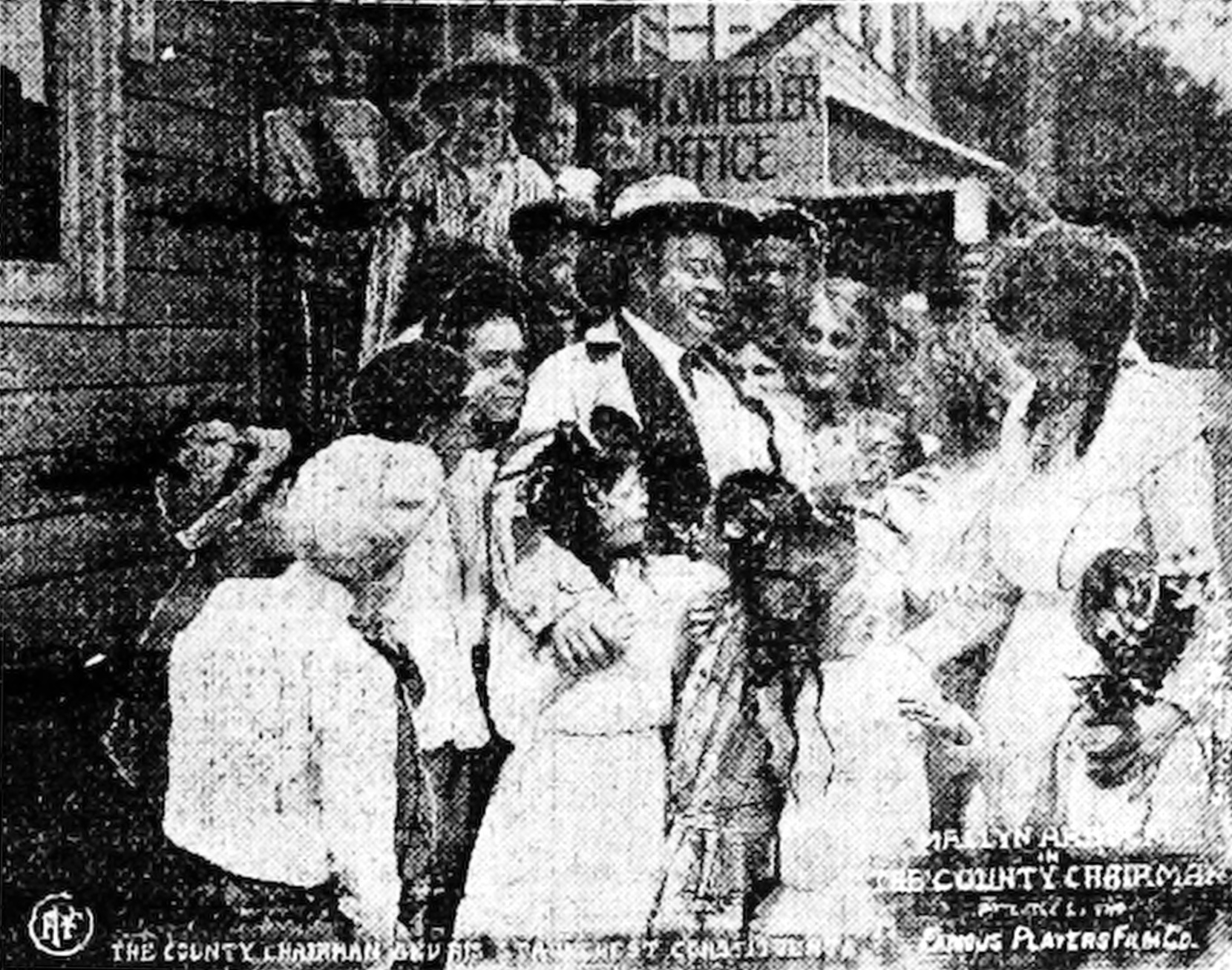
- Scene published in a contemporary newspaper
- Directed by: Allan Dwan
- Written by: Allan Dwan (screenplay/scenario)
- Based on: The County Chairman by George Ade
- Produced by: Adolph Zukor
- Starring: Maclyn Arbuckle; Harold Lockwood
- Cinematography: H. Lyman Broening
- Distributed by: Paramount Pictures
- Release date: October 19, 1914
- Running time: 5 reels
- Country: United States
- Language: Silent film (English intertitles)

The County Chairman is a lost 1914 silent film drama directed by Allan Dwan, produced by the Famous Players Film Company and distributed through Paramount Pictures. It is based on the 1903 stage play by George Ade that starred Maclyn Arbuckle, who reprises his role in this film. Also starring alongside Arbuckle is up-and-coming heartthrob Harold Lockwood. The story is typical of the stage plays (and its star) Adolph Zukor brought to films for his Famous Players Company in its earliest years. This film was remade by Fox in 1935 with Will Rogers.

== Cast ==
- Maclyn Arbuckle - The Honorable Jim Hackler, The County Chairman (*Arbuckle's role in 1903 play)
- Harold Lockwood - Tillford Wheeler
- Willis P. Sweatnam - Sassafras Livingston (*Sweatnam's role in 1903 play)
- William Lloyd - Elias Rigby
- Daisy Jefferson - Lucy Rigby
- Helen Aubrey - Mrs. Rigby
- Mabel Wilbur - Lorena Watkins
- Wellington A. Playter - Joseph Whitaker

unbilled

- Amy Summers - Chick
