= Alfred G. Wathall =

American composer (1880–1938)

Alfred George Wathall (30 January 1880, Bulwell – 14 November 1938, Chicago) was an English-born American composer, music arranger, orchestrator, violinist, and music educator. He is best remembered as a composer of operettas of which his most successful were The Sultan of Sulu (1902) and Sinbad the Sailor (1911). The Sultan of Sulu was staged on Broadway at Wallack's Theatre where it had a successful run in 1902–1903. It used a libretto by George Ade and was produced by Henry W. Savage. He was also a composer of several Christian hymns.

Wathall was educated at Northwestern University School of Music (now Bienen School of Music) where he was a pupil of Peter Lutkin (music theory and composition). A violinist, he later taught on the faculty of that institution as a professor of violin. A longtime resident of Chicago since the age of 12, he was employed as a music arranger and orchestrator for WGN (AM) in Chicago for many years.
