= The Sultan of Sulu =

1902 Sultan musical extravaganza

- A Musical Comedy
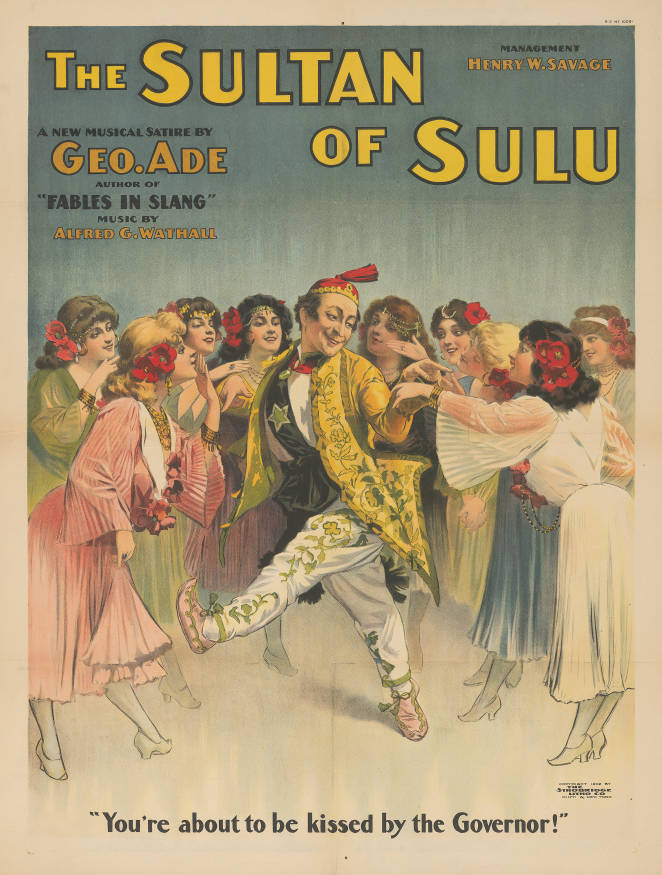
- Music: Alfred G. Wathall
- Lyrics: George Ade
- Book: George Ade
- Productions: 1902 Chicago; 1902 Broadway

The Sultan of Sulu is described as an original satire in two acts. The music is by Alfred G. Wathall and the lyrics by George Ade. It was first produced by the Castle Square Opera Co. under the direction of Henry W. Savage, at the Studebaker Theatre, Chicago, on March 11th 1902. The first Boston performance was at the Tremont Theatre, on December 1st, 1902. On December 29th, 1902 the show opened at New York City's Wallack's Theatre, then moving to the Grand Opera House, running for a total of 200 performances. The show continued to tour professionally until 1909.

== Plot synopsis ==
The curtain rises to the natives singing of the glories of the Sultan and his brother the Sun, with the Sultan a little ahead. Six of the wives of Ki-Ram appear for the morning roll-call, and Hadji, the private secretary, checks off their names. He then informs them that their uncle, the Datto Mandi of Parang, is encamped near the city, and that it is his intention to recapture them. They reply that they would be delighted to be recaptured, in fact, that it was only because they were offered their choice between marriage with Ki-Ram and a miserable death that they reluctantly chose to be his brides.

Lieut. Hardy, of the Regulars, with a detachment of soldiers, next arrives. He announces his mission, which is the annexation of the islands to the great country of the Americans. While the Sultan, shut in his palace, is declaring that he will rather die than surrender Colonel Budd arrives. The Colonel is a military hero whose goal is Congress. He is accompanied by his daughter, Henrietta Budd, Miss Pamela Frances Jackson, the four Boston schoolm'ams, and Wakeful M. Jones. They are told that the Sultan is within making his will, whereupon Jones rushes into the palace to talk life insurance to the Sultan, disregarding Chiquita's warning that it is sudden death to go into the presence of the potentate unannounced.

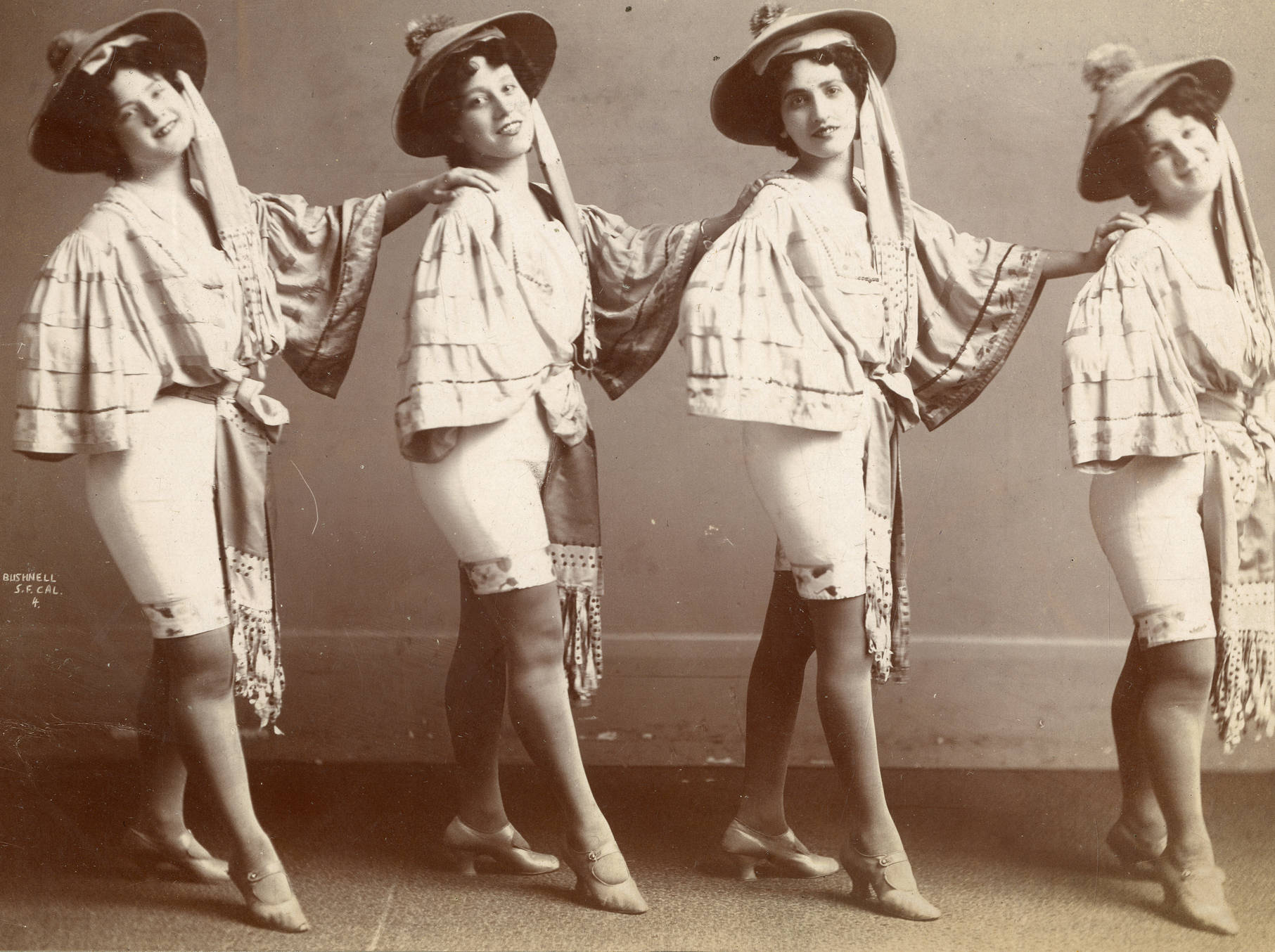

Ki-Ram appears clad in deep black. He is the picture of woe, and announces that he expects to die. Colonel Budd informs him that they have come to take possession of the island and emancipate the natives. Ki-Ram capitulates, seeing that resistance is useless in the face of so many loaded Krag-Jorgensons. The Sultan's attention is now drawn to the charming Boston schoolm'ams, and he is favorably impressed with the new schemes for education. The next important step of the campaign committee is to change Ki-Ram from a sultan into a governor. Under the influence of several cocktails, which Colonel Budd has told him is the national drink of America, he proposes to Miss Jackson, who not only refuses him, but threatens to make him, in her capacity of Judge Advocate, give up all his wives. Ki-Ram is interrupted in his love-making towards the four schoolm'ams by preparations for the inauguration ceremonies. He is presented with a silk hat as the insignia of office, and as the band plays "The Star-spangled Banner" the curtain falls.

The second act takes place in the hanging gardens of the palace. The natives are singing to their Sultan/Governor, and presently he appears on the balcony, showing very plainly the effects of drinking 33 cocktails, the day before. Ki-Ram's dejected condition is not improved by the news that Miss Jackson, as Judge Advocate, has granted divorces to seven of his wives, and that he may keep only one. He is trying to make up his mind which one to keep when Henrietta Budd arrives in a stunning costume, and he decides to let them all go. When the Sultan makes love to her the girl warns him, as a titled foreigner, that she is not an heiress. "Henrietta," reproachfully replies Ki-Ram, "you wrong me-I am Sulu, not English."

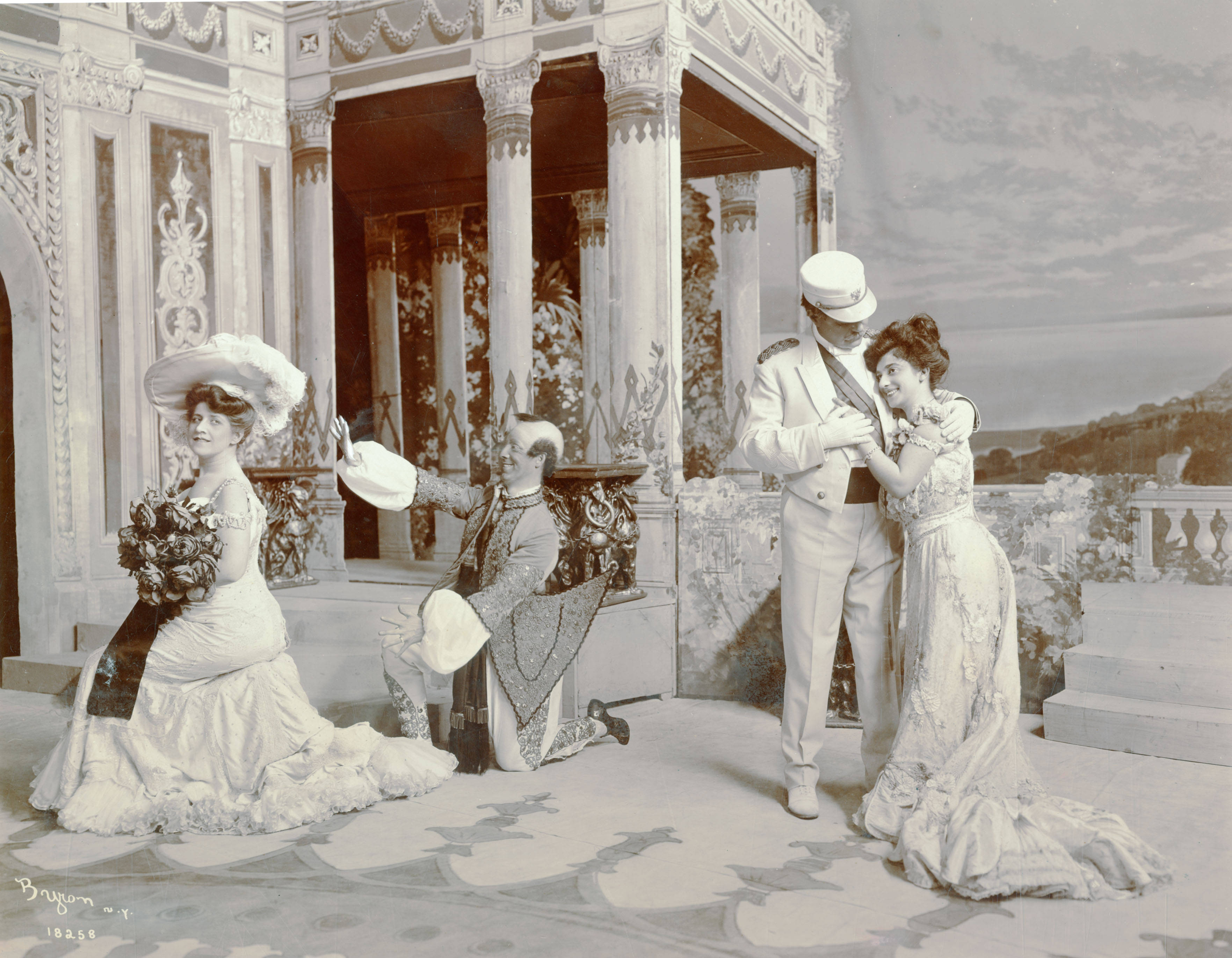

Ki-Ram is informed that he will have to keep one wife, and that that one must be the first, who is Galula, his pet aversion. He is further overcome by the information that according to law he will have to pay each wife alimony equal in amount to one-half of his income. Hadji, the secretary, suggests that as a way out of the pecuniary difficulty thus presented Ki-Ram may permit Datto Mandi to recapture the wives. This pleases the anxious Sultan, who immediately appoints Hadji as an unwilling messenger to Mandi, to notify him that while the Imperial Guards are over at the north wall of the royal castle, repulsing an imaginary foe, he may come in by the south gate and get his nieces. Soon after Hadji has left rifle shots are heard, and he is brought back by two marines somewhat dejected, the traitorous message having been found on his person by the Americans. Ki-Ram denies having sent it, but Miss Jackson's legal mind suspects him. Reminding him that he owes for alimony she has the Sultan handcuffed to Hadji and sent to the guard-house. The monarch and his secretary seize the opportunity to plan a way by which the superfluous wives may all be married off to someone else. Budd and Chiquita fall into the trap, and the members of the harem pair off with soldiers of the Imperial Guard. They are all looking for somebody to perform the ceremony when they are informed by the ubiquitous Miss Jackson that a divorcée cannot marry within the year. The Sultan is attacked by the ferocious Datto Mandi, and his life is saved by Wakeful M. Jones, who has just insured the Sultan-Governor for fifty thousand pesos.

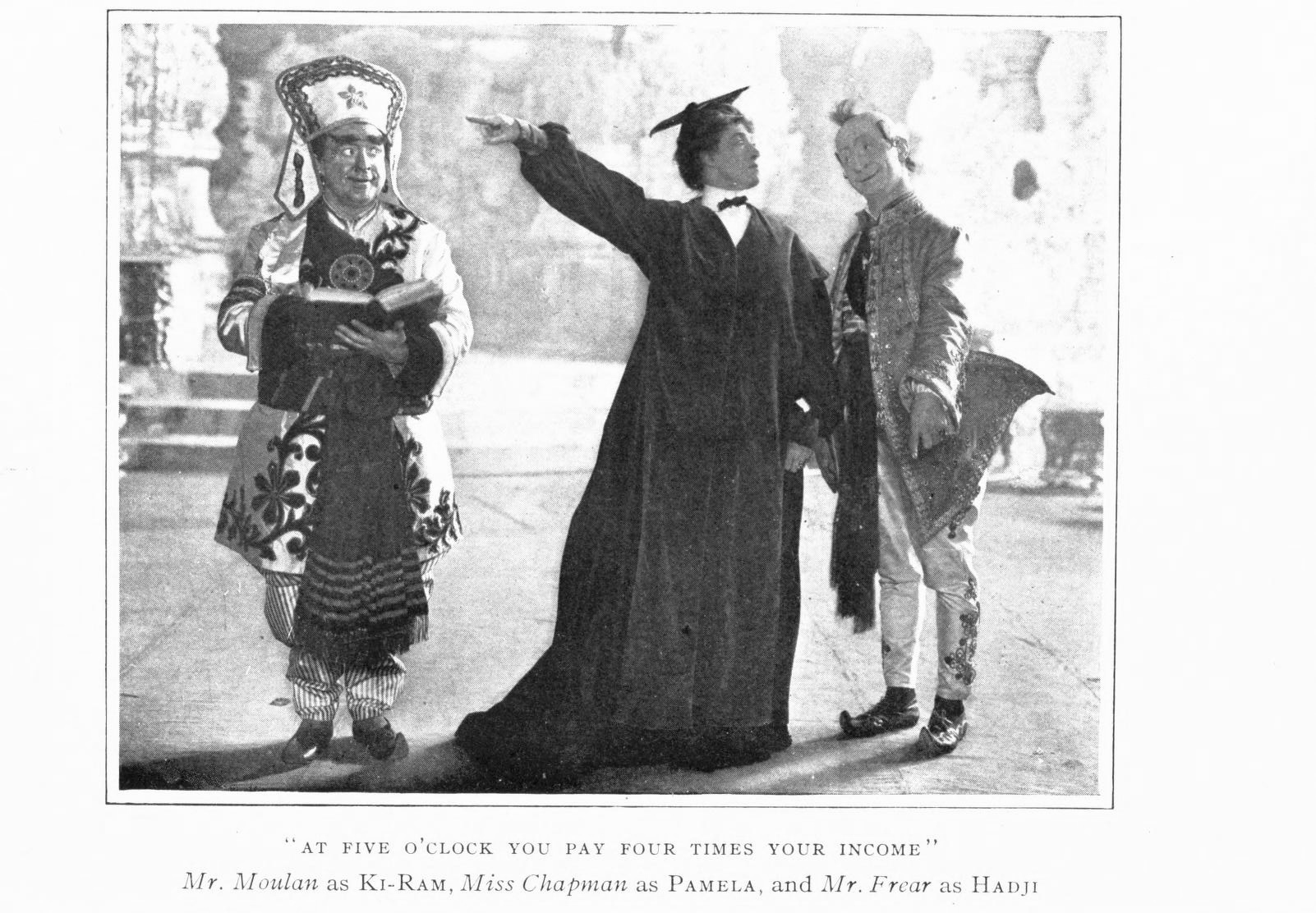

The Democratic and Republican marching clubs suddenly arrive, presenting their rival candidates, the Sultan's slaves. Disgusted with the state of affairs, Ki-Ram is about to go to jail for the rest of his natural existence, when a dispatch boat arrives with the information that by a decision of the Supreme Court the Constitution follows the flag only on Mondays, Wednesdays and Fridays, in which case the Sultan is no longer convict number 47. He is the reigning sovereign once more, and his first official act as such is to order Miss Pamela Frances Jackson back to Boston.

== Characters and original cast ==
The 1902 Chicago cast consisted of:

Role and comments from program	Cast member
Ki-Ram, The Sultan of Sulu	George A . Beane
Colonel Jefferson Budd	Robert Lett
William Hardy	Mr. Reginald Roberts
Hadji Tanton, Private Secretary	Fred Frear
Datto Mandi	William H. Hatter
Wakeful Jones	James F. McDonald
Henrietta Budd, Colonel's daughter	Margaret McKinney
Pamela Frances Jackson, Judge Advocate	Blanche Chapman
Chiquita	Gertrude Quintan

The 1902 Broadway cast consisted of:

Role and comments from program	Cast member
Ki-Ram, The Sultan of Sulu	Frank Moulan
Colonel Jefferson Budd	George H. Shields
William Hardy	Tempter Saxe
Hadji Tanton, Private Secretary	Fred Frear
Datto Mandi	Frank Rainger
Wakeful Jones	Paul Nicholson
Henrietta Budd, Colonel's daughter	Maude Lillian Berri
Pamela Frances Jackson, Judge Advocate	Blanche Chapman
Chiquita	Gertrude Quintan

== Song list ==
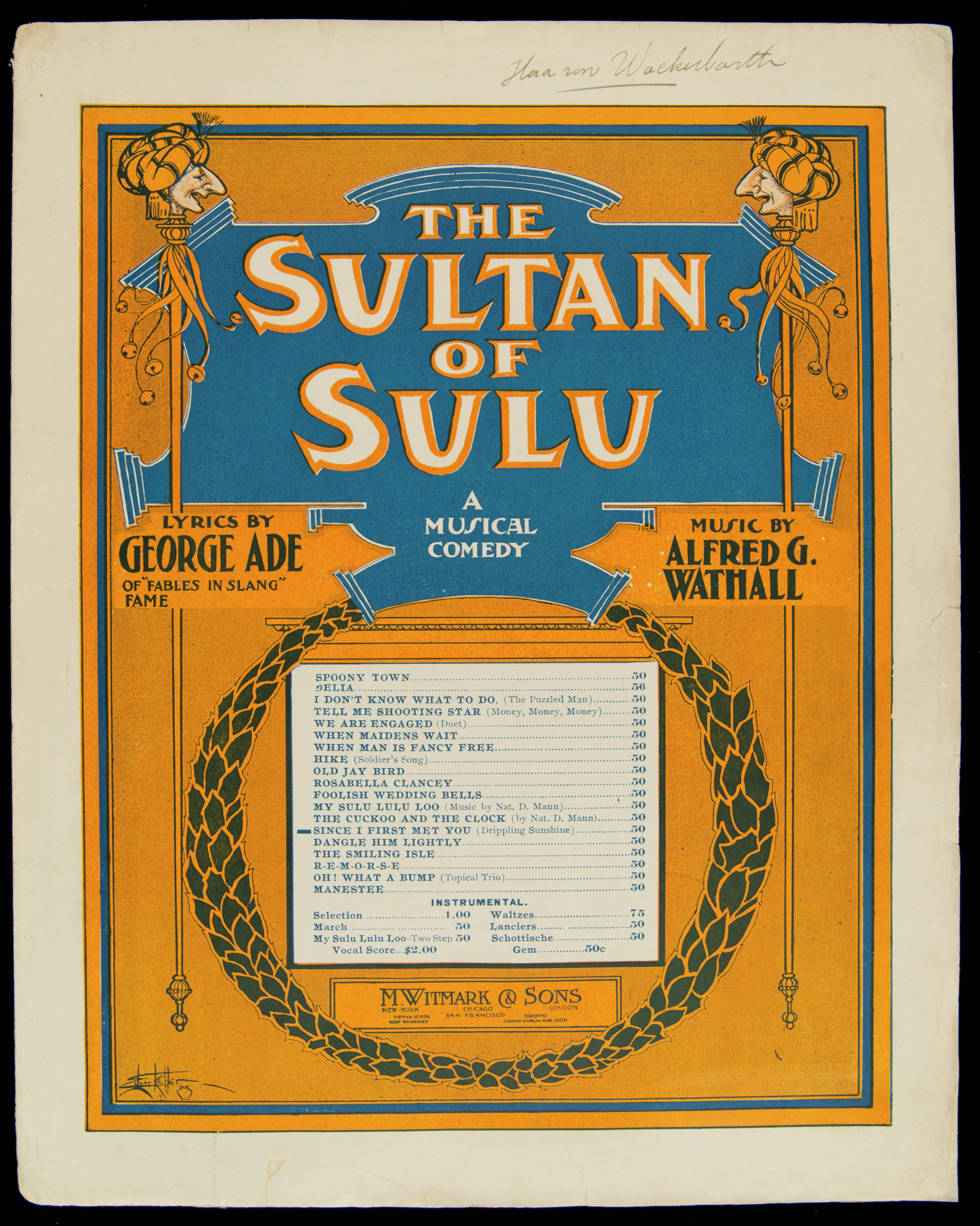

Act One

- Overture
- The Dawning Day
- (Man, Man,) Fickle Man (Later replaced by The Queer Little Ostrich & Every Animal In The Zoo)
- Hike!
- Welcome Chrous
- Palm Branches Waving (Later replaced by In the U.S.A. (originally played where "Hike!" was) & Dangle Him Lightly)
- Entrance to Col. Budd / Chorus to Sultan
- Smiling Isle of Sulu
- From The Land of the Cerebellum
- Oh! What a Bump
- We Are Engaged [Engaged in a Sort of Way]
- When Man is Fancy Free (Cut after Chicago but later replaced by If I But Knew, The Message Of The Red, Red Rose, & A Song of Yesterday)
- In Our Little School!
- My Sulu Lulu Loo
- Act One Finale [Till the Volunteers Return]

Act Two

- Act Two Opening (Tell Me Shooting Star, then replaced by Slumber Song)
- R-e-m-o-r-s-e
- Imperial Guards March
- Old Jay Bird

The Clang of the Forge was added to a later revival

- A Job For A Puzzled Man [I Don’t Know What To Do]
- Since I First Met You
- Always Late
- Allah! Strike for Thee
- Rosabella Clancу / Manistee / Delia
- Spooney Town
- Loudly We Shout
- Carmena (Later replaced by When Maidens Wait, but sometimes Carmena would be brough back in.)
- Foolish Wedding Bells
- Act Two Finale

Songs Cut Before Broadway

- When Man is Fancy Free
- The Cuckoo and the Clock
- My Texas Rosebud
- The Flag
- Flying Fish
- I Sing to thee alone
- Carmena

== Post World War II revivals ==
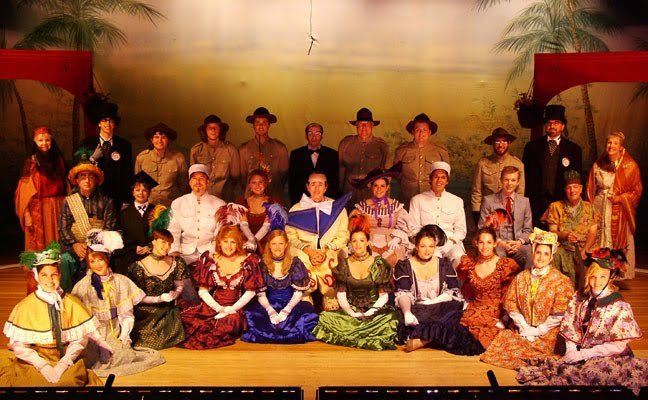
Cast of the 2009 Sultan of Sulu Revival

The first post World War II revival took place in Canton, Ohio. The Canton Comic Opera Company revived the piece on July 16-19, 2009 at the Canton Jewish Community Center Auditorium. The show had a cast of 30, and a 28 piece orchestra. The last time the piece was performed in Canton, Ohio was 1922 by the Canton Operatic Club. The family of the Sultan in Sulu, reportedly asked the production videotape recording to be shared to classrooms in Sulu.

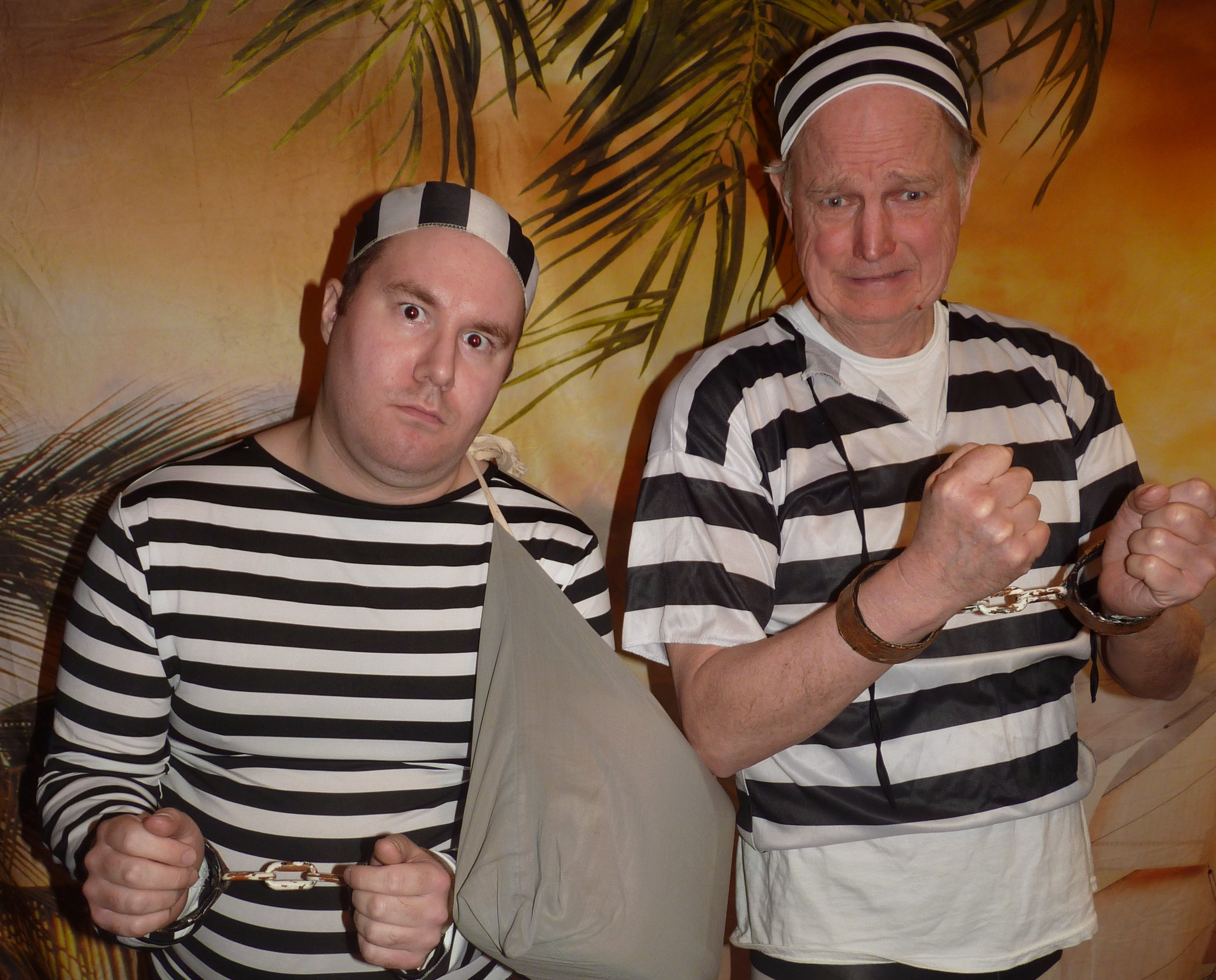
Hadji (Silas Green) and The Sultan (Bart Bales) in prison outfits from the 2026 revival by Offsite Connecticut Theatre.

Golden Age Theatricals and Offsite Connecticut Theatre is set to revive the work after tackling musical revivals such as the 1903 Wizard of Oz, The Woggle Bug and The Gingerbread Man. The show is set to open June 27, 2026 at the Farmington Library. This show has included new creative consultants (some even from the Philippines) as well as a revised book and a new framing device.
