= The County Chairman (play) =

1903 comedy play by George Ade

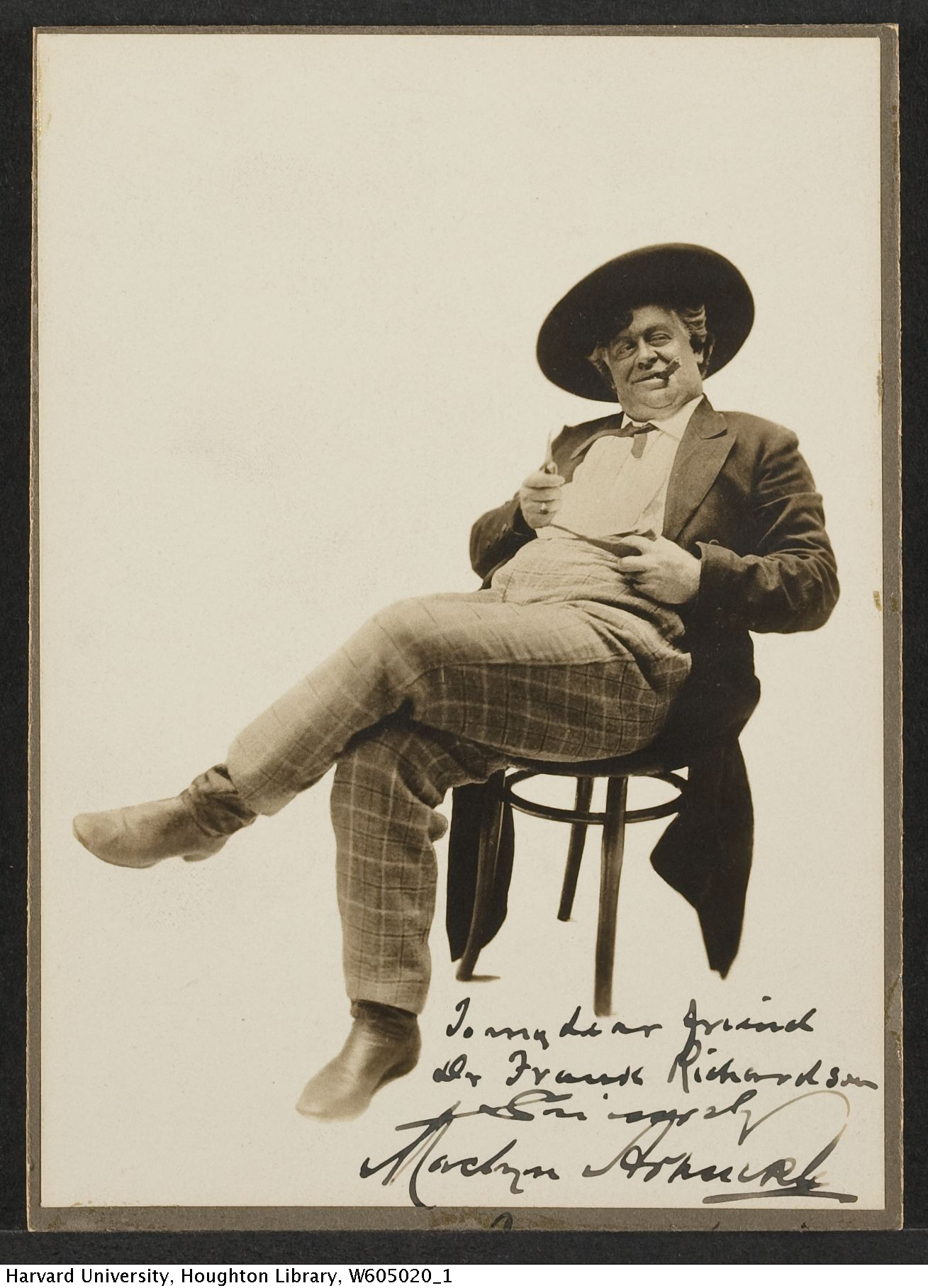
- Maclyn Arbuckle as Hon. Jim Hackler in the play (circa 1904)
- Original language: English
- Written by: George Ade
- Genre: Comedy

Premiere
- Date: 24 November 1903 (Broadway)
- Place: Wallack's Theatre

The County Chairman is a 1903 comedy play by George Ade, which was one of his greatest successes. Produced by Henry W. Savage, it played for 222 performances on Broadway at Wallack's Theatre. It was also adapted to film in 1914 and 1935.

== Play ==
The County Chairman was Ade's first attempt at non-musical comedy. The play was first performed at the Auditorium in South Bend, Indiana, on August 29, 1903, and also played for a number of weeks at the Studebaker Theatre in Chicago. It opened on Broadway on Tuesday, November 24, 1903, and played for 222 performances. The reviews of the play were also positive. Maclyn Arbuckle, playing the local politician Jim Hackler, starred both on Broadway and on the road, playing the role for four years. Reviewers also praised Willis P. Sweatnam's blackface role. Sweatnam was an old minstrel performer who Ade worked into the play after finding he had fallen on hard times. (Black actor Stepin Fetchit played the former blackface role in the 1935 film.)

The play closed for the season at Wallack's on June 4, 1904, but returned for 44 more performances in the fall before going on the road. It was also revived in 1936 for eight performances at the National Theatre, with Charles Coburn playing Hackler, but did not draw large audiences.

Ade later recounted that he took the names of many of play's characters from a list of tax delinquents posted in the courthouse of Vicksburg, Mississippi, a "grand roster of good old Anglo-Saxon names" which fit the "undiluted American 'types' to be found in Antioch", the location of the play.

The County Chairman was included in Burns Mantle's Best Plays of 1899-1909 volume published in 1944.

A study of Ade's work published in 1964 concluded that The County Chairman had been "largely ignored in histories of American drama," despite being "the worthiest of Ade's plays."

== Original Broadway cast ==
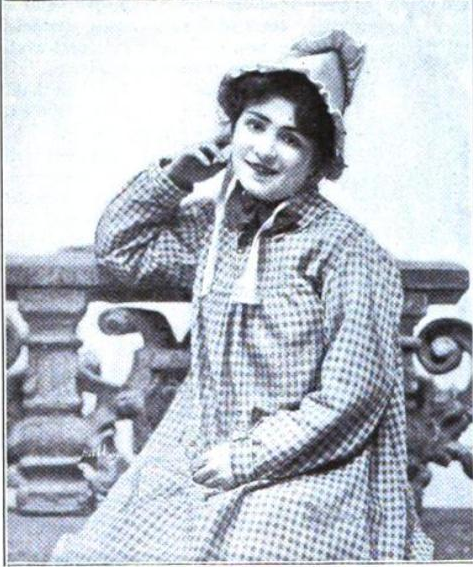
Anna Buckley in the role of Chick Elzey

- The Honorable Jim Hackler ... Maclyn Arbuckle
- Tillford Wheeler ... Earle Browne
- Elias Rigby ... Charles Fisher
- Riley Cleaver ... Fred Bock
- Wilson Prewitt ... Harry Holman
- Jupiter Pettaway ... George Ricketts
- Sassafras Livingston ... Willis P. Sweatnam
- Jefferson Briscoe ... Edward Chapman
- Uncle Eck Millbury ... W.J. Gross
- Vance Jimmison ... J. Sydney Macy
- Joe Whittaker ... E.R. Phillips
- Cal Barcus ... Claude C. Boyer
- "Chub" Tolliver ... Fred Santley
- Amos Whitney ... Roy Richards
- Clabe Overton ... Howard Cuyler
- Dawson Montgomery ... John J. Meehan
- Lucy Rigby ... Miriam Nesbitt
- Mrs. Elias Rigby ... Christine Blessing
- Mrs. Jefferson Briscoe ... Rose Beaudet
- Lorena Watkins ... Grace Fisher
- "Chick" Elzey ... Anna Buckley
- Tilly .... Nina Ainscoe

== Adaptations ==
The play first adapted to a film of the same name in 1914, with Arbuckle and Sweatnam returning to their original roles. It was again adapted to film in 1935.
