= List of Arkansas Razorbacks men's basketball seasons =

This is a list of seasons completed by the Arkansas Razorbacks men's college basketball team.

== Seasons ==
Statistics overview
Season	Coach	Overall	Conference	Standing	Postseason
Francis Schmidt (Southwest Conference) (1923–1929)
1923–24	Francis Schmidt	17–11	3–9	7th	
1924–25	Francis Schmidt	21–5	9–3	5th	
1925–26	Francis Schmidt	23–2	11–1	1st	
1926–27	Francis Schmidt	14–2	8–2	1st	
1927–28	Francis Schmidt	19–1	12–0	1st	
1928–29	Francis Schmidt	19–1	11–1	1st	
Francis Schmidt:		113–22	54–16		
Charles Bassett (Southwest Conference) (1929–1933)
1929–30	Charles Bassett	16–7	10–2	1st	
1930–31	Charles Bassett	14–9	7–5	T–3rd	
1931–32	Charles Bassett	18–6	8–4	3rd	
1932–33	Charles Bassett	14–7	6–6	4th	
Charles Bassett:		62–29	31–17		
Glen Rose (Southwest Conference) (1933–1942)
1933–34	Glen Rose	16–8	6–6	3rd	
1934–35	Glen Rose	14–5	9–3	T–1st	
1935–36	Glen Rose	24–3	11–1	1st	
1936–37	Glen Rose	12–6	8–4	2nd	
1937–38	Glen Rose	19–3	11–1	1st	
1938–39	Glen Rose	18–5	9–3	2nd	
1939–40	Glen Rose	12–10	6–6	4th	
1940–41	Glen Rose	20–3	12–0	1st	NCAA Final Four
1941–42	Glen Rose	19–4	10–2	T–1st	
Glen Rose:		154–47	82–26		
Eugene Lambert (Southwest Conference) (1942–1949)
1942–43	Eugene Lambert	19–7	8–4	3rd	
1943–44	Eugene Lambert	16–8	11–1	T–1st	NCAA tournament^{[Note A]}
1944–45	Eugene Lambert	17–9	9–3	2nd	NCAA Final Four
1945–46	Eugene Lambert	16–7	9–3	2nd	
1946–47	Eugene Lambert	14–10	8–4	T–2nd	
1947–48	Eugene Lambert	16–8	8–4	3rd	
1948–49	Eugene Lambert	15–11	9–3	T–1st	NCAA Elite Eight
Eugene Lambert:		113–60	62–22		
Presley Askew (Southwest Conference) (1949–1952)
1949–50	Presley Askew	12–12	8–4	T–1st	
1950–51	Presley Askew	13–11	7–5	4th	
1951–52	Presley Askew	10–14	4–8	T–6th	
Presley Askew:		35–37	19–17		
Glen Rose (Southwest Conference) (1952–1966)
1952–53	Glen Rose	10–11	4–8	T–5th	
1953–54	Glen Rose	13–9	6–6	T–3rd	
1954–55	Glen Rose	14–9	8–4	T–2nd	
1955–56	Glen Rose	11–12	9–3	2nd	
1956–57	Glen Rose	11–12	5–7	5th	
1957–58	Glen Rose	17–10	9–5	T–1st	NCAA University Division Sweet Sixteen
1958–59	Glen Rose	9–14	6–8	T–5th	
1959–60	Glen Rose	12–11	7–7	T–4th	
1960–61	Glen Rose	16–7	9–5	3rd	
1961–62	Glen Rose	14–10	5–9	6th	
1962–63	Glen Rose	13–11	8–6	4th	
1963–64	Glen Rose	9–14	6–8	6th	
1964–65	Glen Rose	9–14	5–9	5th	
1965–66	Glen Rose	13–10	7–7	4th	
Glen Rose:		171–154 (325–201)	94–92 (176–118)		
Duddy Waller (Southwest Conference) (1966–1970)
1966–67	Duddy Waller	6–17	4–10	T–7th	
1967–68	Duddy Waller	10–14	7–7	5th	
1968–69	Duddy Waller	10–14	4–10	8th	
1969–70	Duddy Waller	5–19	3–11	8th	
Duddy Waller:		31–64	18–38		
Lanny Van Eman (Southwest Conference) (1970–1974)
1970–71	Lanny Van Eman	5–21	1–13	8th	
1971–72	Lanny Van Eman	8–18	5–9	6th	
1972–73	Lanny Van Eman	16–10	9–5	T–2nd	
1973–74	Lanny Van Eman	10–16	6–8	5th	
Lanny Van Eman:		39–65	21–35		
Eddie Sutton (Southwest Conference) (1974–1985)
1974–75	Eddie Sutton	17–9	11–3	2nd	
1975–76	Eddie Sutton	19–9	9–7	4th	
1976–77	Eddie Sutton	26–2	16–0	1st	NCAA Division I First Round
1977–78	Eddie Sutton	32–4	14–2	T–1st	NCAA Division I Final Four
1978–79	Eddie Sutton	25–5	13–3	T–1st	NCAA Division I Elite Eight
1979–80	Eddie Sutton	21–8	13–3	2nd	NCAA Division I First Round
1980–81	Eddie Sutton	24–8	13–3	1st	NCAA Division I Sweet Sixteen
1981–82	Eddie Sutton	23–6	12–4	1st	NCAA Division I First Round
1982–83	Eddie Sutton	26–4	14–2	2nd	NCAA Division I Sweet Sixteen
1983–84	Eddie Sutton	25–7	14–2	2nd	NCAA Division I First Round
1984–85	Eddie Sutton	22–13	10–6	2nd	NCAA Division I Second Round
Eddie Sutton:		260–75	139–35		
Nolan Richardson (Southwest Conference) (1985–1991)
1985–86	Nolan Richardson	12–16	4–12	7th	
1986–87	Nolan Richardson	19–14	8–8	5th	NIT Second Round
1987–88	Nolan Richardson	21–9	11–5	T–2nd	NCAA Division I First Round
1988–89	Nolan Richardson	25–7	13–3	1st	NCAA Division I Second Round
1989–90	Nolan Richardson	30–5	14–2	1st	NCAA Division I Final Four
1990–91	Nolan Richardson	34–4	15–1	1st	NCAA Division I Elite Eight
Nolan Richardson (Southeastern Conference) (1991–2002)
1991–92	Nolan Richardson	26–8	13–3	1st	NCAA Division I Second Round
1992–93	Nolan Richardson	22–9	10–6	1st (West)	NCAA Division I Sweet Sixteen
1993–94	Nolan Richardson	31–3	14–2	1st	NCAA Division I Champion
1994–95	Nolan Richardson	32–7	12–4	T–1st (West)	NCAA Division I Runner-up
1995–96	Nolan Richardson	20–13	9–7	T–2nd (West)	NCAA Division I Sweet Sixteen
1996–97	Nolan Richardson	18–14	8–8	2nd (West)	NIT Fourth Place
1997–98	Nolan Richardson	24–9	11–5	2nd (West)	NCAA Division I Second Round
1998–99	Nolan Richardson	23–11	9–7	2nd (West)	NCAA Division I Second Round
1999–00	Nolan Richardson	19–15	7–9	3rd (West)	NCAA Division I First Round
2000–01	Nolan Richardson	20–11	10–6	2nd (West)	NCAA Division I First Round
2001–02	Nolan Richardson; Mike Anderson	14–15	6–10	4th (West)	
Nolan Richardson:		390–170	174–98		
Stan Heath (Southeastern Conference) (2002–2007)
2002–03	Stan Heath	9–19	4–12	T–5th (West)	
2003–04	Stan Heath	12–16	4–12	6th (West)	
2004–05	Stan Heath	18–12	6–10	4th (West)	
2005–06	Stan Heath	22–10	10–6	T–2nd (West)	NCAA Division I First Round
2006–07	Stan Heath	21–14	7–9	3rd (West)	NCAA Division I First Round
Stan Heath:		82–71	31–49		
John Pelphrey (Southeastern Conference) (2007–2011)
2007–08	John Pelphrey	23–12	9–7	2nd (West)	NCAA Division I Second Round
2008–09	John Pelphrey	14–16	2–14	6th (West)	
2009–10	John Pelphrey	14–18	7–9	T–3rd (West)	
2010–11	John Pelphrey	18–13	7–9	T–3rd (West)	
John Pelphrey:		69–59	25–39		
Mike Anderson (Southeastern Conference) (2011–2019)
2011–12	Mike Anderson	18–14	6–10	9th	
2012–13	Mike Anderson	19–13	10–8	7th	
2013–14	Mike Anderson	22–12	10–8	5th	NIT Second Round
2014–15	Mike Anderson	27–9	13–5	2nd	NCAA Division I Second Round
2015–16	Mike Anderson	16–16	9–9	9th	
2016–17	Mike Anderson	26–10	12–6	T–3rd	NCAA Division I Second Round
2017–18	Mike Anderson	23–11	10–8	T–3rd	NCAA Division I First Round
2018–19	Mike Anderson	18–16	8–10	T–9th	NIT Second Round
Mike Anderson:		169–102	78–64		
Eric Musselman (Southeastern Conference) (2019–2024)
2019–20	Eric Musselman	20–12	7–11	T–7th	No postseason held
2020–21	Eric Musselman	25–7	13–4	2nd	NCAA Division I Elite Eight
2021–22	Eric Musselman	28–9	13–5	4th	NCAA Division I Elite Eight
2022–23	Eric Musselman	22–14	8–10	T–9th	NCAA Division I Sweet Sixteen
2023–24	Eric Musselman	16–17	6–12	T–11th	
Eric Musselman:		111–59	47–42		
John Calipari (Southeastern Conference) (2024–present)
2024–25	John Calipari	22–14	8–10	T–9th	NCAA Division I Sweet Sixteen
2025–26	John Calipari	28–9	13–5	T–2nd	NCAA Division I Sweet Sixteen
John Calipari:		50–23	21–15		
Total:		1,849–1,037			
National champion Postseason invitational champion Conference regular season champion Conference regular season and conference tournament champion Division regular season champion Division regular season and conference tournament champion Conference tournament champion

^A. Earned tournament berth, but did not participate due to car accident
