= 1929–30 Arkansas Razorbacks men's basketball team =

American college basketball season

1929–30 Arkansas Razorbacks men's basketball

Southwest Conference Champions
- Conference: Southwest Conference
- Record: 16–7 (10–2 SWC)
- Head coach: Charles Bassett (1st season)
- Home arena: Schmidt Gymnasium

1929–30 Southwest Conference men's basketball standings
	Conf.				Overall
Team	W		L	PCT	W		L	PCT
Arkansas	10	–	2	.833	16	–	7	.696
Texas	8	–	4	.667	12	–	8	.600
SMU	6	–	6	.500	8	–	10	.444
Baylor	4	–	6	.400	10	–	6	.625
Texas A&M	4	–	6	.400	8	–	10	.444
Rice	4	–	8	.333	7	–	9	.438
TCU	4	–	8	.333	7	–	10	.412

The 1929–30 Arkansas Razorbacks men's college basketball team season represented the University of Arkansas in the 1929–30 college basketball season. The Razorbacks played their home games in Schmidt Gymnasium in Fayetteville, Arkansas. It was Charles Bassett's first season as head coach of the Hogs after coaching the basketball team at Texas A&M for two seasons. Former head coach Francis Schmidt left for TCU after overseeing the creation of Arkansas's basketball program and coaching the Razorbacks to four Southwest Conference titles in his six seasons in Fayetteville. The Razorbacks won their fifth-straight Southwest Conference championship in 1930 with a conference record of 10–2 and 16–7 overall.

Forward and College Football Hall of Fame member Wear Schoonover was named a Second Team All-American and earned First Team All-SWC honors for the third straight season. Center Roy Prewitt joined Schoonover on the First Team, as did guard and future Chicago Cardinals coach Milan Creighton.

== Roster ==
1929–30 Arkansas Razorbacks men's basketball roster
Roster retrieved from HogStats.com.
Name	Position	Hometown
Albert Backus	N/A	N/A
Milan Creighton	Guard	Gothenburg, Nebraska
Jethro Henderson	Center/Guard	Hot Springs, Arkansas
Ken Holt	Center	N/A
Tom Oliver	Guard	Jacksonville, Arkansas
Jim Pickren	Forward	Salem, Arkansas
Roy Prewitt	Center	Grady, Arkansas
Wear Schoonover	Forward	Pocahontas, Arkansas
Charles Trapp	N/A	Little Rock, Arkansas

== Schedule and results ==
Schedule retrieved from HogStats.com.

Date time, TV	Rank^{#}	Opponent^{#}	Result	Record	Site city, state
*		Northeastern State Teachers College	W 57–26	1–0	Schmidt Gymnasium; Fayetteville, Arkansas
*		Northeastern State Teachers College	W 37–17	2–0	Schmidt Gymnasium; Fayetteville, Arkansas
*		Southeastern State Teachers College	W 32–29	3–0	Schmidt Gymnasium; Fayetteville, Arkansas
*		Southeastern State Teachers College	W 24–22	4–0	Schmidt Gymnasium; Fayetteville, Arkansas
January 2, 1930*		at Drury	L 25–28	4–1	Springfield, Missouri
January 3, 1930*		at Saint Louis	L 13–32	4–2	West Pine Gym; St. Louis, Missouri
January 4, 1930*		at Southwest Missouri State Teachers College	L 21–40	4–3	Springfield, Missouri
January 6, 1930*		at Kansas State Teachers College of Pittsburg	L 23–36	4–4	Pittsburg, Kansas
January 7, 1930*		at Kansas State Teachers College of Pittsburg	L 20–51	4–5	Pittsburg, Kansas
January 10, 1930		TCU	W 32–21	5–5 (1–0)	Schmidt Gymnasium; Fayetteville, Arkansas
January 11, 1930		TCU	W 22–18	6–5 (2–0)	Schmidt Gymnasium; Fayetteville, Arkansas
January 17, 1930		Texas	W 22–19	7–5 (3–0)	Schmidt Gymnasium; Fayetteville, Arkansas
January 18, 1930		Texas	L 27–29	7–6 (3–1)	Schmidt Gymnasium; Fayetteville, Arkansas
		at Baylor	W 30–23	8–6 (4–1)	Waco, Texas
		at Baylor	W 27–21	9–6 (5–1)	Waco, Texas
February 7, 1930*		at Oklahoma A&M	W 30–20	10–6 (5–1)	Armory–Gymnasium; Stillwater, Oklahoma
February 8, 1930*		at Oklahoma A&M	W 30–23	11–6 (5–1)	Armory-Gymnasium; Stillwater, Oklahoma
		SMU	W 28–27	12–6 (6–1)	Schmidt Gymnasium; Fayetteville, Arkansas
		SMU	W 44–29	13–6 (7–1)	Schmidt Gymnasium; Fayetteville, Arkansas
February 21, 1930		at Texas A&M	W 28–24	14–6 (8–1)	DeWare Field House; College Station, Texas
February 22, 1930		at Texas A&M	W 25–23 ^{OT}	15–6 (9–1)	DeWare Field House; College Station, Texas
February 24, 1930		at Rice	W 30–26	16–6 (10–1)	Houston, Texas
February 25, 1930		at Rice	L 16–37	16–7 (10–2)	Houston, Texas
*Non-conference game. ^{#}Rankings from AP Poll. (#) Tournament seedings in parentheses.
