= 1928–29 Arkansas Razorbacks men's basketball team =

American college basketball season

1928–29 Arkansas Razorbacks men's basketball

Southwest Conference Champions
- Conference: Southwest Conference
- Record: 19–1 (11–1 SWC)
- Head coach: Francis Schmidt (6th season)
- Home arena: Schmidt Gymnasium

1928–29 Southwest Conference men's basketball standings
	Conf.				Overall
Team	W		L	PCT	W		L	PCT
Arkansas	11	–	1	.917	19	–	1	.950
Texas	10	–	2	.833	18	–	2	.900
SMU	6	–	6	.500	7	–	9	.438
TCU	5	–	7	.417	10	–	7	.588
Texas A&M	4	–	6	.400	12	–	6	.667
Baylor	2	–	8	.200	7	–	9	.438
Rice	2	–	10	.167	2	–	10	.167

The 1928–29 Arkansas Razorbacks men's basketball team represented the University of Arkansas in the 1928–29 college basketball season. They played their home games in Schmidt Gymnasium in Fayetteville, Arkansas. It was Francis Schmidt's sixth year as head coach of the Hogs and the program's sixth season overall. The Hogs won their fourth of five straight Southwest Conference championships from 1926 to 1930, finishing with an 11–1 conference record and a record of 19–1 overall.

The 1928–29 season saw the end of a school record thirty-one-game win streak that began the season before on December 30, 1927. The winning streak lasted 406 days before the Razorbacks fell to rival Texas on the road on February 9, 1929.

Future Arkansas coach Eugene Lambert was named to the Helms First-Team All-America squad, while Tom Pickel garnered First-Team All-America honors from College Humor.

College Football Hall of Fame member Wear Schoonover joined Lambert and Pickel on the All-SWC First-Team for 1928–29.

Future head coach of the NFL's Chicago Cardinals, Milan Creighton, played on the 1928–29 Razorback team.

== Roster ==
1928–29 Arkansas Razorbacks men's basketball roster
Roster retrieved from HogStats.com.
Name	Position	Hometown
Milan Creighton	Guard	Gothenburg, Nebraska
Harold Eidson	N/A	Centerville, Arkansas
Arthur Hale	Forward	Fayetteville, Arkansas
Harrison Hale Jr.	Forward	Fayetteville, Arkansas
Jethro Henderson	Center/Guard	Hot Springs, Arkansas
Ken Holt	Center	N/A
Gene Lambert	N/A	Searcy, Arkansas
Tom Oliver	Guard	Jacksonville, Arkansas
Tom Pickel	Center	N/A
Jim Pickren	Forward	Salem, Arkansas
Roy Prewitt	Center	Grady, Arkansas
Wear Schoonover	Forward	Pocahontas, Arkansas

== Schedule and results ==
Schedule retrieved from HogStats.com.

Date time, TV	Rank^{#}	Opponent^{#}	Result	Record	Site city, state
*		Northeastern State Teachers College	W 54–28	1–0	Schmidt Gymnasium; Fayetteville, Arkansas
*		Northeastern State Teachers College	W 61–24	2–0	Schmidt Gymnasium; Fayetteville, Arkansas
*		Little Rock All-Stars	W 32–21	3–0	Little Rock, Arkansas
December 19, 1928*		at Fort Smith Collegians	W 45–22	4–0	Fort Smith, Arkansas
*		at Jonesboro YMCA	W 43–30	5–0	Jonesboro, Arkansas
December 22, 1928*		at Earle Cardinals	W 47–25	6–0	Earle, Arkansas
January 4, 1929		at SMU	W 32–26	7–0 (1–0)	Old Gym; Dallas, Texas
January 5, 1929		at SMU	W 39–17	8–0 (2–0)	Old Gym; Dallas, Texas
		at TCU	W 41–24	9–0 (3–0)	TCU Fieldhouse; Fort Worth, Texas
January 8, 1929		at TCU	W 66–26	10–0 (4–0)	TCU Fieldhouse; Fort Worth, Texas
		Baylor	W 59–24	11–0 (5–0)	Schmidt Gymnasium; Fayetteville, Arkansas
		Baylor	W 71–23	12–0 (6–0)	Schmidt Gymnasium; Fayetteville, Arkansas
February 1, 1929*		Drury College	W 52–25	13–0 (6–0)	Schmidt Gymnasium; Fayetteville, Arkansas
February 2, 1929*		Drury College	W 42–22	14–0 (6–0)	Schmidt Gymnasium; Fayetteville, Arkansas
February 8, 1929		at Texas	W 48–32	15–0 (7–0)	State School for the Deaf Fieldhouse; Austin, Texas
February 9, 1929		at Texas	L 25–36	15–1 (7–1)	State School for the Deaf Fieldhouse; Austin, Texas
February 15, 1929		Rice	W 51–18	16–1 (8–1)	Schmidt Gymnasium; Fayetteville, Arkansas
February 16, 1929		Rice	W 44–13	17–1 (9–1)	Schmidt Gymnasium; Fayetteville, Arkansas
February 22, 1929		Texas A&M	W 49–32	18–1 (10–1)	Schmidt Gymnasium; Fayetteville, Arkansas
February 23, 1929		Texas A&M	W 38–29	19–1 (11–1)	Schmidt Gymnasium; Fayetteville, Arkansas
*Non-conference game. (#) Tournament seedings in parentheses.
