= 1925–26 Arkansas Razorbacks men's basketball team =

American college basketball season

1925–26 Arkansas Razorbacks men's basketball

Southwest Conference Champions
- Conference: Southwest Conference
- Record: 23-2 (11–1 SWC)
- Head coach: Francis Schmidt (3rd season)
- Home arena: Schmidt Gymnasium

1925–26 Southwest Conference men's basketball standings
	Conf.				Overall
Team	W		L	PCT	W		L	PCT
Arkansas	11	–	1	.917	23	–	2	.920
SMU	8	–	4	.667	10	–	6	.625
TCU	7	–	5	.583	13	–	9	.591
Texas	6	–	6	.500	12	–	10	.545
Baylor	5	–	7	.417	8	–	7	.533
Texas A&M	4	–	8	.333	8	–	9	.471
Rice	1	–	11	.083	1	–	13	.071

The 1925–26 Arkansas Razorbacks men's basketball team represented the University of Arkansas in the 1925–26 college basketball season. They played their home games in Schmidt Gymnasium in Fayetteville, Arkansas. It was Francis Schmidt's third year as head coach of the Hogs and the program's third season. The Hogs won their first conference championship in basketball, finishing with an 11–1 Southwest Conference record and a record of 23–2 overall.

== Roster ==
1925–26 Arkansas Razorbacks men's basketball roster
Roster retrieved from HogStats.com.
Name	Position	Hometown
Rolla Adams	Forward	Selma, Louisiana
James Ayers	Forward	Dierks, Arkansas
Houston Burke	Guard	Jonesboro, Arkansas
Bryan Gregory	Forward	N/A
Ralph Haizlip	N/A	Hot Springs, Arkansas
Curtis Parker	Guard	Lawton, Oklahoma
Elbert Pickel	Center	Fayetteville, Arkansas
Leo Riner	Forward	Pine Bluff, Arkansas
Glen Rose	N/A	North Little Rock, Arkansas
Charles Ruckman	Guard	Fayetteville, Arkansas
Harold Steele	Center	De Queen, Arkansas

== Schedule and results ==
Schedule retrieved from HogStats.com.

Date time, TV	Rank^{#}	Opponent^{#}	Result	Record	Site city, state
*		at Ozark Athletic Club	W 81–7	1–0	
*		at Fort Smith National Guard	W 64–6	2–0	Fort Smith, AR
*		vs. Union Trust Company	W 35–22	3–0	Little Rock, AR
*		England Athletic Club	W 64–18	4–0	Schmidt Gymnasium; Fayetteville, AR
*		at Jonesboro YMCA	W 29–22	5–0	Jonesboro, AR
*		at First District Agricultural and Mechanical College	W 32–14	6–0	Jonesboro, AR
*		at Centralia Lions	W 29–13	7–0	Centralia, IL
January 1, 1926*		at Coliseum Athletic Club	W 29–20	8–0	Francis Gymnasium; St. Louis, MO
January 2, 1926*		at Saint Louis	L 30–40	8–1	First Regiment Armory; St. Louis, MO
January 8, 1926*		Hendrix College	W 43–25	9–1	Schmidt Gymnasium; Fayetteville, AR
January 9, 1926*		Hendrix College	W 39–21	10–1	Schmidt Gymnasium; Fayetteville, AR
January 15, 1926		SMU	W 29–27	11–1 (1–0)	Schmidt Gymnasium; Fayetteville, AR
January 16, 1926		SMU	W 28–8	12–1 (2–0)	Schmidt Gymnasium; Fayetteville, AR
January 22, 1926		at Baylor	W 22–9	13–1 (3–0)	Waco, TX
January 23, 1926		at Baylor	W 19–14	14–1 (4–0)	Waco, TX
January 29, 1926*		Centenary	W 69–21	15–1 (4–0)	Schmidt Gymnasium; Fayetteville, AR
January 30, 1926*		Centenary	W 43–9	16–1 (4–0)	Schmidt Gymnasium; Fayetteville, AR
February 5, 1926		Texas	W 35–12	17–1 (5–0)	Schmidt Gymnasium; Fayetteville, AR
February 6, 1926		Texas	W 27–7	18–1 (6–0)	Schmidt Gymnasium; Fayetteville, AR
February 12, 1926		at Rice	W 54–15	19–1 (7–0)	Houston, TX
February 13, 1926		at Rice	W 25–17	20–1 (8–0)	Houston, TX
February 15, 1926		at Texas A&M	W 37–27	21–1 (9–0)	DeWare Field House; College Station, TX
February 16, 1926		at Texas A&M	W 35–21	22–1 (10–0)	DeWare Field House; College Station, TX
February 26, 1926		TCU	W 24–23	23–1 (11–0)	Schmidt Gymnasium; Fayetteville, AR
February 27, 1926		TCU	L 15–30	23–2 (11–1)	Schmidt Gymnasium; Fayetteville, AR
*Non-conference game. (#) Tournament seedings in parentheses.
