= 1926–27 Arkansas Razorbacks men's basketball team =

American college basketball season

1926–27 Arkansas Razorbacks men's basketball

Southwest Conference Champions
- Conference: Southwest Conference
- Record: 14–2 (8–2 SWC)
- Head coach: Francis Schmidt (4th season)
- Home arena: Schmidt Gymnasium

1926–27 Southwest Conference men's basketball standings
	Conf.				Overall
Team	W		L	PCT	W		L	PCT
Arkansas	8	–	2	.800	14	–	2	.875
SMU	7	–	4	.636	12	–	5	.706
Texas	7	–	4	.636	13	–	9	.591
TCU	6	–	4	.600	9	–	8	.529
Texas A&M	4	–	6	.400	10	–	7	.588
Baylor	0	–	3	.000	8	–	4	.667
Rice	0	–	9	.000	0	–	9	.000

The 1926–27 Arkansas Razorbacks men's basketball team represented the University of Arkansas in the 1926–27 college basketball season. The Razorbacks played their home games in Schmidt Gymnasium in Fayetteville, Arkansas. It was Francis Schmidt's fourth season as head coach of the Hogs and the program's fourth season overall. The Razorbacks won the Southwest Conference regular season championship with a record of 8–2 and 14–2 overall, Arkansas's second of five straight conference titles.

The season featured Arkansas's first-ever overtime game, a 23–22 victory over TCU in Fort Worth.

Future Arkansas football and basketball coach Glen Rose, Harold Steele, and Tom Pickell were all First-Team All-SWC players for the season.

== Schedule and results ==
Schedule retrieved from HogStats.com.

Date time, TV	Rank^{#}	Opponent^{#}	Result	Record	Site city, state
*		Northeastern State Teachers College	W 27–13	1–0	Schmidt Gymnasium; Fayetteville, Arkansas
*		Northeastern State Teachers College	W 25–19	2–0	Schmidt Gymnasium; Fayetteville, Arkansas
*		Graham & Broening	W 38–34	3–0	Little Rock, Arkansas
*		Southwestern Bell	W 42–26	4–0	Little Rock, Arkansas
*		at Jonesboro YMCA	W 49–25	5–0	Jonesboro, Arkansas
*		at First District Agricultural and Mechanical College	W 42–12	6–0	Jonesboro, Arkansas
January 7, 1927		Rice	W 36–18	7–0 (1–0)	Schmidt Gymnasium; Fayetteville, Arkansas
January 8, 1927		Rice	W 34–18	8–0 (2–0)	Schmidt Gymnasium; Fayetteville, Arkansas
January 14, 1927		at TCU	W 24–16	9–0 (3–0)	TCU Fieldhouse; Fort Worth, Texas
January 15, 1927		at TCU	W 23–22 ^{OT}	10–0 (4–0)	TCU Fieldhouse; Fort Worth, Texas
January 21, 1927		Texas A&M	W 34–27	11–0 (5–0)	Schmidt Gymnasium; Fayetteville, Arkansas
January 22, 1927		Texas A&M	W 25–16	12–0 (6–0)	Schmidt Gymnasium; Fayetteville, Arkansas
February 4, 1927		at Texas	L 29–32	12–1 (6–1)	Men's Gym; Austin, Texas
February 5, 1927		at Texas	L 24–28	12–2 (6–2)	Men's Gym; Austin, Texas
		at SMU	W 32–30	13–2 (7–2)	Dallas, Texas
		at SMU	W 32–31	14–2 (8–2)	Dallas, Texas
*Non-conference game. ^{#}Rankings from AP Poll. (#) Tournament seedings in parentheses. All times are in Central Time.
