= Faulkner Performing Arts Center =

Jim & Joyce Faulkner Performing Arts Center
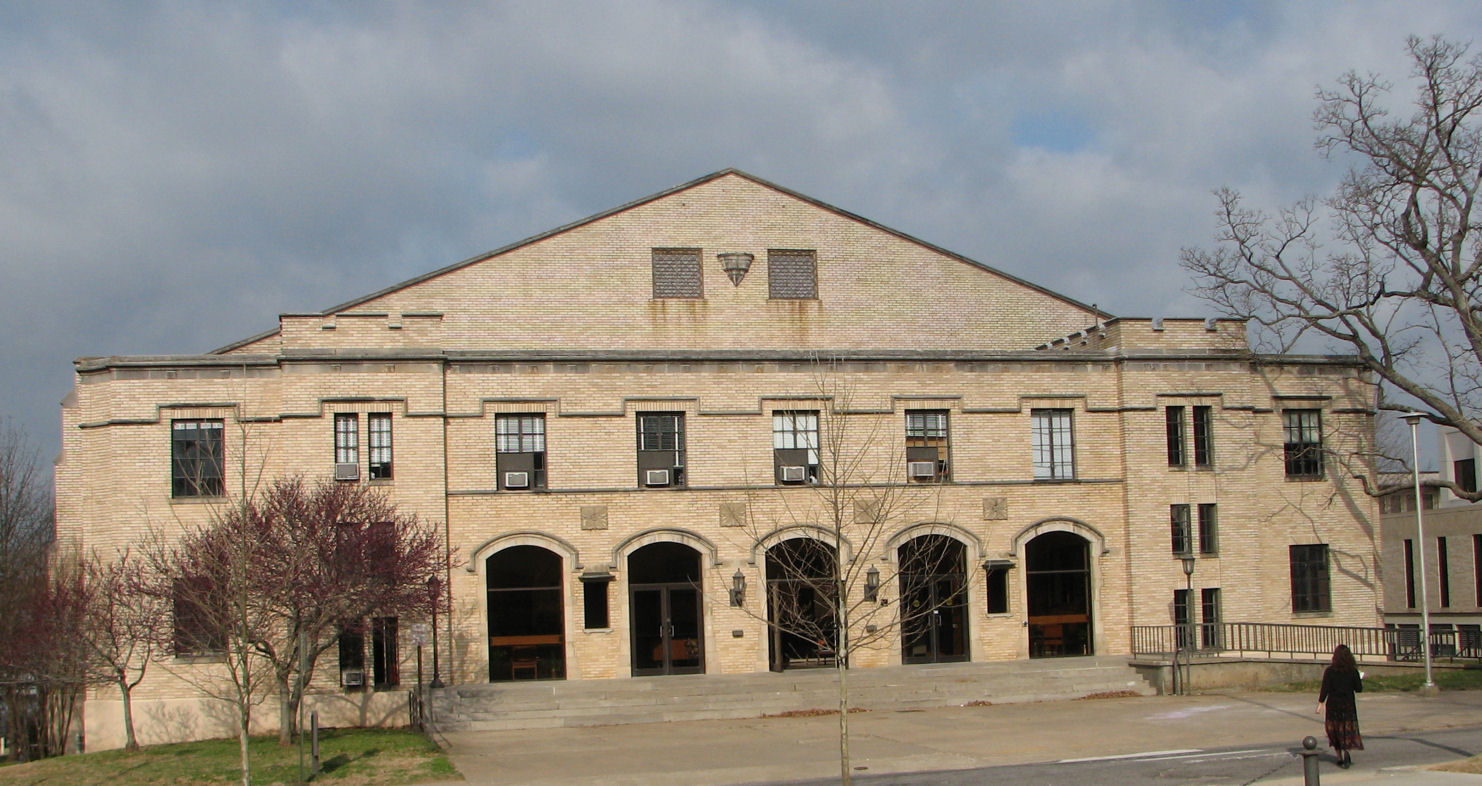
- The Faulkner Performing Arts Center at the UA.
- Interactive map of the Jim & Joyce Faulkner Performing Arts Center area
- Former names: Men's Gymnasium

General information
- Type: Collegiate Performing Arts Center
- Architectural style: Collegiate Gothic
- Location: 453 N Garland Avenue, Fayetteville, Arkansas
- Elevation: 1,430 ft (440 m)
- Named for: Jim & Joyce Faulkner
- Construction started: 1936
- Renovated: 2015
- Owner: University of Arkansas

Design and construction
- Architecture firm: Haralson & Nelson, Fort Smith, Arkansas
- Developer: J.H. Leveck & Son, Little Rock, Arkansas

Website
- https://faulkner.uark.edu/
- Men's Gymnasium-University of Arkansas, Fayetteville
- U.S. National Register of Historic Places
- Location within Arkansas Location within the United States
- Location: Garland Ave., Fayetteville, Arkansas
- Coordinates: 36°4′10″N 94°10′33″W
- Area: 1.1 acres (0.45 ha)
- Built: 1936-37
- MPS: Public Schools in the Ozarks MPS
- NRHP reference No.: 92001103
- Added to NRHP: September 4, 1992

The Jim & Joyce Faulkner Performing Arts Center is a performing arts center on the University of Arkansas campus in Fayetteville, Arkansas.

== Architecture ==
The Faulkner Center is a 2 1/2-story, light buff brick building, trimmed in limestone and built in the Collegiate Gothic style. It is roughly a square building with a gable roof over the majority of the structure, as well as a flat roof with a raised parapet above the front porch. The gable roof has asphalt shingles, while the flat portion is covered with a tar roof. The structure was added to the National Register of Historic Places in 1992.

== Men's Gymnasium ==
After fourteen seasons competing in Schmidt Gymnasium, the Razorback basketball team moved into the Men's Gymnasium starting with the 1937–38 season. The gym's capacity of 2,500 nearly doubled the capacity of "Schmidt's Barn." Construction began on the museum in 1936, it was completed before the fall semester of 1937, and it was dedicated on February 4, 1938 in a 53–26 win against TCU. The Razorbacks played their home games in the Men's Gymnasium through the 1954–55 season, after which they moved into Barnhill Arena.

== Space Center ==
From 2003 to 2006, the building hosted the university's Space Center. The Space Center, founded in 2000, is a partnership of six departments (Biological Sciences, Chemical Engineering, Chemistry/Biochemistry, Geosciences, Mechanical Engineering, and Physics) from four colleges (Fulbright College, Engineering, the Honors College, and the Graduate School). It contains the W.M. Keck Laboratory for Planetary Simulation, which is used primarily for the study of Mars, asteroids, Pluto, and Titan. The center also has an astronomy group, that specializes in galactic evolution, binary stars, and gravity waves, and it has groups interested in planetary astronomy, cosmochemistry, astrobiology, remote sensing, planetary morphology, and space flight instrument development. The center offers two graduate degrees, a PhD and an MS in space and planetary sciences and four concentrations in space and planetary sciences in programs offered by its partnering departments. The Space Center offers courses of research and instruction for undergraduate students and a variety of outreach programs for the public. The center owns a 20-foot planetarium for teaching and outreach, which is currently out of operation. The center also produces a monthly newsletter (Space Notes) and a quarterly publication, Meteorite. The center celebrated its 10th anniversary in 2010.

The center houses the Paragould meteorite, the third largest meteorite from North America, since 1988, except for a short period when it was in the Mullins Library.

== Faulkner Performing Arts Center ==
On September 5, 2012, it was announced that the building would become a concert hall for the performing arts, thanks in part to a donation of $6 million by Jim and Joyce Faulkner. The renovation was completed in September 2015.
