= 1928–29 Baylor Bears basketball team =

American college basketball season

1928–29 Baylor Bears men's basketball
- Conference: Southwest Conference
- Record: 7-9 (2-8 SWC)
- Head coach: Ralph Wolf

1928–29 Southwest Conference men's basketball standings
	Conf.				Overall
Team	W		L	PCT	W		L	PCT
Arkansas	11	–	1	.917	19	–	1	.950
Texas	10	–	2	.833	18	–	2	.900
SMU	6	–	6	.500	7	–	9	.438
TCU	5	–	7	.417	10	–	7	.588
Texas A&M	4	–	6	.400	12	–	6	.667
Baylor	2	–	8	.200	7	–	9	.438
Rice	2	–	10	.167	2	–	10	.167

The 1928-29 Baylor Bears basketball team represented the Baylor University during the 1928-29 college men's basketball season.

== Schedule ==
Date time, TV	Opponent	Result	Record	Site city, state
*	Daniel Baker	W 44-39	1-0	Waco, TX
*	Southeastern Oklahoma State	L 19-24	1-1	Waco, TX
*	Southeastern Oklahoma State	L 45-46	1-2	Waco, TX
*	Daniel Baker	W 29-21	2-2	Waco, TX
*	West Texas State	L 28-50	2-3	Waco, TX
	Texas	L 19-22	2-4	Waco, TX
	at Arkansas	L 20-60	2-5	Fayetteville, AR
	at Arkansas	L 27-63	2-6	Fayetteville, AR
	Rice	W 41-38	3-6	Waco, TX
	TCU	L 21-38	3-7	Waco, TX
	at SMU	W 23-19	4-7	Dallas, TX
	at Texas	L 23-57	4-8	Austin, TX
	SMU	W 33-29	5-8	Waco, TX
	at TCU	L 24-53	5-9	Fort Worth, TX
	Rice	W 40-20	6-9	Waco, TX
	Rice	W 36-28	7-9	Waco, TX
*Non-conference game. (#) Tournament seedings in parentheses.
