= 1920–21 Baylor Bears basketball team =

American college basketball season

1920–21 Baylor Bears men's basketball
- Conference: Southwest Conference
- Record: 13-11 (8-4 SWC)
- Head coach: Frank Bridges

1920–21 Southwest Conference men's basketball standings
	Conf.				Overall
Team	W		L	PCT	W		L	PCT
Texas A&M	10	–	2	.833	16	–	6	.727
Baylor	8	–	4	.667	13	–	11	.542
Texas	9	–	5	.643	13	–	5	.722
Rice	4	–	9	.308	5	–	10	.333
SMU	0	–	11	.000	6	–	13	.316

The 1920-21 Baylor Bears basketball team represented the Baylor University during the 1920-21 college men's basketball season.

== Schedule ==
Date time, TV	Opponent	Result	Record	Site city, state
*	Tarleton State	L 18-33	0-1	Waco, TX
	at SMU	W 29-19	1-1	Dallas, TX
	at SMU	W 24-18	2-1	Dallas, TX
*	Tarleton State	L 21-38	2-2	Waco, TX
	at Rice	L 21-29	2-3	Houston, TX
	at Rice	L 17-28	2-4	Houston, TX
	Texas	L 10-32	2-5	Waco, TX
	Texas	W 25-18	3-5	Waco, TX
*	Southwestern	W 31-19	4-5	Waco, TX
*	Southwestern	W 29-28	5-5	Waco, TX
	Rice	W 25-19	6-5	Waco, TX
	Rice	W 35-24	7-5	Waco, TX
	SMU	W 34-14	8-5	Waco, TX
	SMU	W 21-18	9-5	Waco, TX
	at Texas	W 28-25	10-5	Austin, TX
	at Texas	L 20-37	10-6	Austin, TX
*	Hardin–Simmons	L 28-33	10-7	Waco, TX
*	Hardin-Simmons	L 18-20	10-8	Waco, TX
*	Baylor Medical School	W 29-23	11-8	Waco, TX
*	at Baylor Medical School	L 26-38	11-9	Houston, TX
*	LSU	W 32-20	12-9	Waco, TX
*	LSU	L 33-34	12-10	Waco, TX
*	Austin College	W 40-20	13-10	Waco, TX
*	at Southwestern	L 21-23	13-11	Waco, TX
*Non-conference game. (#) Tournament seedings in parentheses.
