= 1921–22 Baylor Bears basketball team =

American college basketball season

1921–22 Baylor Bears men's basketball
- Conference: Southwest Conference
- Record: 10-8 (8-8 SWC)
- Head coach: Frank Bridges

1921–22 Southwest Conference men's basketball standings
| | Conf. | | | | Overall |
| Team | W | | L | PCT | W | | L | PCT |
|---|---|---|---|---|---|---|---|---|
| Texas A&M | 13 | – | 3 | .813 | 18 | – | 3 | .857 |
| Texas | 14 | – | 4 | .778 | 20 | – | 4 | .833 |
| Baylor | 8 | – | 8 | .500 | 10 | – | 8 | .556 |
| SMU | 4 | – | 11 | .267 | 8 | – | 14 | .364 |
| Oklahoma A&M | 1 | – | 4 | .200 | 5 | – | 16 | .238 |
| Rice | 1 | – | 11 | .083 | 2 | – | 12 | .143 |

The 1921-22 Baylor Bears basketball team represented the Baylor University during the 1921-22 college men's basketball season.

== Schedule ==
| Date time, TV | Opponent | Result | Record | Site city, state |
|---|---|---|---|---|
| | Texas A&M | W 17-15 | 1-0 | Waco, TX |
| | Texas A&M | L 15-17 | 1-1 | Waco, TX |
| | at Texas | L 10-45 | 1-2 | Austin, TX |
| | at Texas | L 15-33 | 1-3 | Austin, TX |
| | SMU | W 39-19 | 2-3 | Waco, TX |
| | SMU | W 23-13 | 3-3 | Waco, TX |
| | Rice | L 22-25 | 3-4 | Waco, TX |
| * | Baylor Medical School | W 46-13 | 4-4 | Waco, TX |
| | Texas | L 25-30 | 4-5 | Waco, TX |
| | Texas | W 35-26 | 5-5 | Waco, TX |
| | Oklahoma A&M | W 29-11 | 6-5 | Waco, TX |
| | Oklahoma A&M | W 24-21 | 7-5 | Waco, TX |
| | at SMU | L 17-19 | 7-6 | Dallas, TX |
| | at SMU | L 18-19 | 7-7 | Dallas, TX |
| | at Texas A&M | W 19-18 | 8-7 | College Station, TX |
| | at Texas A&M | L 14-33 | 8-8 | College Station, TX |
| * | at Houston Gulf | W 34-11 | 9-8 | Waco, TX |
| | at Rice | W 26-13 | 10-8 | Houston, TX |
*Non-conference game. (#) Tournament seedings in parentheses.
