= 1925–26 Baylor Bears basketball team =

American college basketball season

1925–26 Baylor Bears men's basketball
- Conference: Southwest Conference
- Record: 7-8 (5-7 SWC)
- Head coach: Frank Bridges

1925–26 Southwest Conference men's basketball standings
	Conf.				Overall
Team	W		L	PCT	W		L	PCT
Arkansas	11	–	1	.917	23	–	2	.920
SMU	8	–	4	.667	10	–	6	.625
TCU	7	–	5	.583	13	–	9	.591
Texas	6	–	6	.500	12	–	10	.545
Baylor	5	–	7	.417	8	–	7	.533
Texas A&M	4	–	8	.333	8	–	9	.471
Rice	1	–	11	.083	1	–	13	.071

The 1925-26 Baylor Bears basketball team represented the Baylor University during the 1925-26 college men's basketball season.

== Schedule ==
Date time, TV	Opponent	Result	Record	Site city, state
*	Dallas A.A.	W 30-24	1-0	Waco, TX
	at Texas A&M	W 22-19	2-0	College Station, TX
	Rice	W 14-13	3-0	Waco, TX
	Arkansas	L 9-22	3-1	Waco, TX
	Arkansas	L 14-19	3-2	Waco, TX
	at Texas	W 29-22	4-2	Austin, TX
*	Centenary	L 26-27	4-3	Waco, TX
*	Centenary	W 30-27	5-3	Waco, TX
	at TCU	W 25-17	6-3	Fort Worth, TX
	TCU	L 14-21	6-4	Waco, TX
	at SMU	L 21-22	6-5	Dallas, TX
	Texas	L 19-22	6-6	Waco, TX
	Rice	W 31-26	7-6	Waco, TX
	Texas A&M	L 25-27	7-7	Waco, TX
	SMU	L 12-24	7-8	Waco, TX
*Non-conference game. (#) Tournament seedings in parentheses.
