= 1927–28 Arkansas Razorbacks men's basketball team =

American college basketball season

1927–28 Arkansas Razorbacks men's basketball

Southwest Conference Champions
- Conference: Southwest Conference
- Record: 19–1 (12–0 SWC)
- Head coach: Francis Schmidt (5th season)
- Home arena: Schmidt Gymnasium

1927–28 Southwest Conference men's basketball standings
| | Conf. | | | | Overall |
| Team | W | | L | PCT | W | | L | PCT |
|---|---|---|---|---|---|---|---|---|
| Arkansas | 12 | – | 0 | 1.000 | 19 | – | 1 | .950 |
| SMU | 10 | – | 2 | .833 | 14 | – | 3 | .824 |
| Texas | 7 | – | 5 | .583 | 12 | – | 5 | .706 |
| TCU | 5 | – | 7 | .417 | 9 | – | 8 | .529 |
| Rice | 3 | – | 9 | .250 | 3 | – | 9 | .250 |
| Baylor | 2 | – | 8 | .200 | 8 | – | 10 | .444 |
| Texas A&M | 1 | – | 9 | .100 | 4 | – | 12 | .250 |

The 1927–28 Arkansas Razorbacks men's basketball team season represented the University of Arkansas in the 1927–28 college basketball season. The Razorbacks played their home games in Schmidt Gymnasium in Fayetteville, Arkansas. It was Francis Schmidt's fifth season under head coach of the Hogs and the program's fifth season overall. The Razorbacks won the Southwest Conference regular season championship with a record of 12–0 and 19–1 overall, Arkansas's third of five straight conference titles and first-ever perfect conference season.

Future Arkansas football and basketball coach Glen Rose was a Helms First-Team All-American for the season. Tom Pickell, future head basketball coach Eugene Lambert, and College Football Hall of Fame member Wear Schoonover joined Rose on the All-SWC team.

== Schedule and results ==
Schedule retrieved from HogStats.com.

| Date time, TV | Rank^{#} | Opponent^{#} | Result | Record | Site city, state |
|---|---|---|---|---|---|
| December 16, 1927* | | Northeastern State Teachers College | W 59–29 | 1–0 | Schmidt Gymnasium; Fayetteville, Arkansas |
| December 17, 1927* | | Northeastern State Teachers College | W 61–24 | 2–0 | Schmidt Gymnasium; Fayetteville, Arkansas |
| December 21, 1927* | | at Drury College | W 39–20 | 3–0 | Springfield, Missouri |
| December 22, 1927* | | at Southwest Missouri State Teachers College | L 31–45 | 3–1 | Springfield, Missouri |
| December 30, 1927* | | at College of the Ozarks | W 53–27 | 4–1 | Clarksville, Arkansas |
| December 31, 1927* | | at College of the Ozarks | W 59–20 | 5–1 | Clarksville, Arkansas |
| January 6, 1928 | | TCU | W 23–18 | 6–1 (1–0) | Schmidt Gymnasium; Fayetteville, Arkansas |
| January 7, 1928 | | TCU | W 28–24 ^{OT} | 7–1 (2–0) | Schmidt Gymnasium; Fayetteville, Arkansas |
| January 13, 1928 | | Texas | W 42–26 | 8–1 (3–0) | Schmidt Gymnasium; Fayetteville, Arkansas |
| January 14, 1928 | | Texas | W 59–29 | 9–1 (4–0) | Schmidt Gymnasium; Fayetteville, Arkansas |
| January 20, 1928* | | Hendrix College | W 69–30 | 10–1 (4–0) | Schmidt Gymnasium; Fayetteville, Arkansas |
| January 21, 1928* | | Hendrix College | W 50–24 | 11–1 (4–0) | Schmidt Gymnasium; Fayetteville, Arkansas |
| February 3, 1928 | | at Baylor | W 59–21 | 12–1 (5–0) | Waco, Texas |
| February 4, 1928 | | at Baylor | W 34–21 | 13–1 (6–0) | Waco, Texas |
| February 10, 1928 | | SMU | W 48–26 | 14–1 (7–0) | Schmidt Gymnasium; Fayetteville, Arkansas |
| February 11, 1928 | | SMU | W 34–22 | 15–1 (8–0) | Schmidt Gymnasium; Fayetteville, Arkansas |
| February 17, 1928 | | at Rice | W 20–11 | 16–1 (9–0) | Houston, Texas |
| February 18, 1928 | | at Rice | W 28–23 | 17–1 (10–0) | Houston, Texas |
| February 20, 1928 | | at Texas A&M | W 42–18 | 18–1 (11–0) | DeWare Fieldhouse; College Station, Texas |
| February 21, 1928 | | at Texas A&M | W 46–31 | 19–1 (12–0) | DeWare Fieldhouse; College Station, Texas |
*Non-conference game. ^{#}Rankings from AP Poll. (#) Tournament seedings in parentheses. All times are in Central Time.
