= 1937–38 Arkansas Razorbacks men's basketball team =

American college basketball season

1937–38 Arkansas Razorbacks men's basketball

Southwest Conference Champions
- Conference: Southwest Conference
- Record: 19-3 (11–1 SWC)
- Head coach: Glen Rose (5th season)
- Home arena: Men's Gymnasium

1937–38 Southwest Conference men's basketball standings
	Conf.				Overall
Team	W		L	PCT	W		L	PCT
Arkansas	11	–	1	.917	19	–	3	.864
Baylor	9	–	3	.750	10	–	6	.625
SMU	8	–	4	.667	9	–	6	.600
Texas A&M	6	–	6	.500	10	–	8	.556
Texas	5	–	7	.417	11	–	11	.500
Rice	2	–	10	.167	6	–	17	.261
TCU	1	–	11	.083	8	–	15	.348

The 1937–38 Arkansas Razorbacks men's basketball team represented the University of Arkansas in the 1937–38 college basketball season. The Razorbacks played their home games in the new Men's Gymnasium, after fourteen seasons in Schmidt Gymnasium. It was Glen Rose's fifth season as head coach of the Hogs. Arkansas won the Southwest Conference Championship for the eighth time in the program's fifteenth season, finishing with an 11–1 record in conference play and 19–3 overall.

== Roster ==
1937–38 Arkansas Razorbacks men's basketball roster
Roster retrieved from HogStats.com.
Name	Number	Position	Height	Hometown
James Benton	19	Forward	6'4"	Fordyce, Arkansas
Harold Brady	30	Guard	5'11"	Webbers Falls, Oklahoma
Lendon Chambers	51	Guard	6'2"	Stuttgart, Arkansas
John Donaldson	N/A	N/A	N/A	N/A
Ray Hamilton	42	Center	6'4"	Sheridan, Arkansas
Don Lockard	30	Forward	6'2"	Batesville, Arkansas
Bobbie Martin	32	Guard	6'1"	Texarkana, Arkansas
Jack Robbins	21	Guard	6'2"	Little Rock, Arkansas

There are two unknown players named Haygood that played for the 1937–38 team.

== Schedule and results ==
Schedule retrieved from HogStats.com.

Date time, TV	Rank^{#}	Opponent^{#}	Result	Record	Site city, state
December 17, 1937*		Staf-O-Life AAU	W 52–26	1–0	Men's Gymnasium; Fayetteville, AR
December 21, 1937*		at Murrary State Teachers College	L 40–43	1–1	Lovett Auditorium; Murray, KY
December 22, 1937*		vs. Ole Miss	W 47–43	2–1	Memphis, TN
December 23, 1937*		Ole Miss	W 48–46	3–1	North Little Rock, AR
*		vs. Northwestern Oklahoma Teachers College; All College Tournament	W 45–44	4–1	Oklahoma City, OK
*		vs. Central Missouri State Teachers College; All College Tournament	W 43–36	5–1	Oklahoma City, OK
December 29, 1937*		vs. Southwestern College; All College Tournament	L 33–36	5–2	Oklahoma City, OK
December 30, 1937*		vs. North Texas State Teachers College; All College Tournament	W 32–21	6–2	Oklahoma City, OK
January 7, 1938		at Texas A&M	W 45–32	7–2 (1–0)	DeWare Field House; College Station, TX
January 8, 1938		at Texas A&M	W 33–22	8–2 (2–0)	DeWare Field House; College Station, TX
*		Parks Clothiers AAU	W 28–25	9–2 (2–0)	Men's Gymnasium; Fayetteville, AR
January 20, 1938		Rice	W 38–31	10–2 (3–0)	Men's Gymnasium; Fayetteville, AR
January 21, 1938		Rice	W 59–37	11–2 (4–0)	Men's Gymnasium; Fayetteville, AR
January 29, 1938*		Marianna AAU	W 57–25	12–2 (4–0)	Men's Gymnasium; Fayetteville, AR
February 4, 1938		TCU; Men's Gymnasium Dedication	W 53–26	13–2 (5–0)	Men's Gymnasium; Fayetteville, AR
February 5, 1938		TCU	W 57–38	14–2 (6–0)	Men's Gymnasium; Fayetteville, AR
February 11, 1938		Texas	W 74–38	15–2 (7–0)	Men's Gymnasium; Fayetteville, AR
February 12, 1938		Texas	W 42–37	16–2 (8–0)	Men's Gymnasium; Fayetteville, AR
February 19, 1938		at Baylor	L 47–54	16–3 (8–1)	Waco, TX
February 21, 1938		at Baylor	W 54–45	17–3 (9–1)	Waco, TX
February 25, 1938		SMU	W 32–23	18–3 (10–1)	Men's Gymnasium; Fayetteville, AR
February 25, 1938		SMU	W 34–26	19–3 (11–1)	Men's Gymnasium; Fayetteville, AR
*Non-conference game. (#) Tournament seedings in parentheses.
