= 1924–25 Baylor Bears basketball team =

American college basketball season

1924–25 Baylor Bears men's basketball
- Conference: Southwest Conference
- Record: 3-12 (2-12 SWC)
- Head coach: Frank Bridges

1924–25 Southwest Conference men's basketball standings
	Conf.				Overall
Team	W		L	PCT	W		L	PCT
Oklahoma A&M	12	–	2	.857	15	–	3	.833
TCU	11	–	3	.786	14	–	5	.737
Arkansas	10	–	4	.714	21	–	5	.808
Texas	9	–	5	.643	17	–	8	.680
Texas A&M	6	–	8	.429	9	–	8	.529
SMU	4	–	10	.286	5	–	11	.313
Baylor	2	–	12	.143	3	–	12	.200
Rice	2	–	12	.143	2	–	12	.143

The 1924-25 Baylor Bears basketball team represented the Baylor University during the 1924-25 college men's basketball season.

== Schedule ==
Date time, TV	Opponent	Result	Record	Site city, state
*	Houston YMCA	W 27-17	1-0	Waco, TX
	TCU	L 18-29	1-1	Waco, TX
	Texas A&M	L 13-15	1-2	Waco, TX
	Rice	W 14-7	2-2	Waco, TX
	at Arkansas	L 14-39	2-3	Fayetteville, AR
	at Arkansas	L 14-23	2-4	Fayetteville, AR
	at Texas	L 21-31	2-5	Austin, TX
	at TCU	L 17-32	2-6	Fort Worth, TX
	Oklahoma A&M	L 16-24	2-7	Waco, TX
	Oklahoma A&M	L 11-15	2-8	Waco, TX
	Texas	L 16-19	2-9	Waco, TX
	SMU	W 9-8	3-9	Waco, TX
	at Rice	L 16-24	3-10	Houston, TX
	at Texas A&M	L 10-24	3-11	College Station, TX
	at SMU	L 16-28	3-12	Dallas, TX
*Non-conference game. (#) Tournament seedings in parentheses.
