= 1922–23 Baylor Bears basketball team =

American college basketball season

1922–23 Baylor Bears men's basketball
- Conference: Southwest Conference
- Record: 7-16 (7-13 SWC)
- Head coach: Frank Bridges

1922–23 Southwest Conference men's basketball standings
	Conf.				Overall
Team	W		L	PCT	W		L	PCT
Texas A&M	15	–	3	.833	16	–	4	.800
Texas	9	–	7	.563	11	–	7	.611
Rice	7	–	8	.467	10	–	9	.526
Oklahoma A&M	7	–	8	.467	12	–	11	.522
Baylor	7	–	13	.350	7	–	16	.304
SMU	4	–	10	.286	10	–	11	.476

The 1922-23 Baylor Bears basketball team represented the Baylor University during the 1922-23 college men's basketball season.

== Schedule ==
Date time, TV	Opponent	Result	Record	Site city, state
	at SMU	L 23-24	0-1	Dallas, TX
	at SMU	W 17-13	1-1	Dallas, TX
	Texas A&M	L 15-25	1-2	Waco, TX
	Texas A&M	L 19-32	1-3	Waco, TX
	at Texas	L 18-35	1-4	Austin, TX
	at Texas	L 7-23	1-5	Austin, TX
	Rice	L 20-22	1-6	Waco, TX
	Rice	W 11-8	2-6	Waco, TX
	at Oklahoma A&M	L 19-23	2-7	Stillwater, OK
	at Oklahoma A&M	L 22-39	2-8	Stillwater, OK
	Texas	L 18-23	2-9	Waco, TX
	Texas	W 21-19	3-9	Waco, TX
	Oklahoma A&M	W 21-20	4-9	Waco, TX
	Oklahoma A&M	L 17-22	4-10	Waco, TX
	Texas A&M	L 30-34	4-11	Waco, TX
	Texas A&M	L 14-34	4-12	Waco, TX
	SMU	W 12-7	5-12	Waco, TX
	SMU	W 20-14	6-12	Waco, TX
	Rice	W 26-25	7-12	Waco, TX
	Rice	L 18-32	7-13	Waco, TX
*	Stickler Lumber	L 6-26	7-14	Waco, TX
*	Stickler Lumber	L 14-46	7-15	Waco, TX
*	NEW Orleans Athletic Club	L 19-32	7-16	Waco, TX
*Non-conference game. (#) Tournament seedings in parentheses.
