= 1923–24 Baylor Bears basketball team =

American college basketball season

1923–24 Baylor Bears men's basketball
- Conference: Southwest Conference
- Record: 11-23 (7-17 SWC)
- Head coach: Frank Bridges

1923–24 Southwest Conference men's basketball standings
	Conf.				Overall
Team	W		L	PCT	W		L	PCT
Texas	20	–	0	1.000	23	–	0	1.000
TCU	15	–	4	.789	16	–	4	.800
Texas A&M	13	–	10	.565	13	–	10	.565
Oklahoma A&M	9	–	5	.643	14	–	6	.700
Baylor	7	–	17	.292	11	–	23	.324
SMU	7	–	15	.318	9	–	15	.375
Arkansas	3	–	9	.250	17	–	11	.607
Rice	3	–	17	.150	3	–	17	.150

The 1923-24 Baylor Bears basketball team represented the Baylor University during the 1923-24 college men's basketball season.

== Schedule ==
Date time, TV	Opponent	Result	Record	Site city, state
*	New Orleans Athletic Club	W 39-29	1-0	Waco, TX
*	Mercer	L 16-22	1-1	Waco, TX
*	Houston YMCA	W 23-22	2-1	Waco, TX
*	Port Arthur YMCA	W 27-25	3-1	Waco, TX
*	State Stanley	L 22-27	3-2	Waco, TX
*	Macon YMCA	L 15-22	3-3	Waco, TX
*	Chattanooga YMCA	L 18-41	3-4	Waco, TX
*	Memphis	L 33-34	3-5	Waco, TX
*	Jonesboro (Ark.) HS	L 19-32	3-6	Waco, TX
*	D'La (Miss.)	W 44-15	4-6	Waco, TX
	Rice	W 18-15	5-6	Waco, TX
	Rice	W 11-5	6-6	Waco, TX
	Texas A&M	L 4-21	6-7	Waco, TX
	Texas A&M	W 15-9	7-7	Waco, TX
	Texas	L 10-19	7-8	Waco, TX
	Texas	L 10-17	7-9	Waco, TX
	Rice	W 26-22	8-9	Waco, TX
	Rice	L 17-33	8-10	Waco, TX
	SMU	W 15-13	9-10	Waco, TX
	SMU	L 16-20	9-11	Waco, TX
	at TCU	L 19-33	9-12	Fort Worth, TX
	at TCU	L 21-29	9-13	Fort Worth, TX
	at Oklahoma A&M	L 13-42	9-14	Stillwater, OK
	at Oklahoma A&M	L 30-35	9-15	Stillwater, OK
	at Texas	L 12-22	9-16	Austin, TX
	at Texas	L 24-27	9-17	Austin, TX
	Arkansas	W 33-29	10-17	Waco, TX
	Arkansas	L 14-28	10-18	Waco, TX
	Texas A&M	L 13-37	10-19	Waco, TX
	Texas A&M	L 14-26	10-20	Waco, TX
	TCU	L 13-42	10-21	Waco, TX
	TCU	L 17-32	10-22	Waco, TX
	at SMU	W 25-20	11-22	Dallas, TX
	at SMU	L 20-21	11-23	Dallas, TX
*Non-conference game. (#) Tournament seedings in parentheses.
