= 1927–28 Baylor Bears basketball team =

American college basketball season

1927–28 Baylor Bears men's basketball
- Conference: Southwest Conference
- Record: 9-9 (2-8 SWC)
- Head coach: Ralph Wolf

1927–28 Southwest Conference men's basketball standings
| | Conf. | | | | Overall |
| Team | W | | L | PCT | W | | L | PCT |
|---|---|---|---|---|---|---|---|---|
| Arkansas | 12 | – | 0 | 1.000 | 19 | – | 1 | .950 |
| SMU | 10 | – | 2 | .833 | 14 | – | 3 | .824 |
| Texas | 7 | – | 5 | .583 | 12 | – | 5 | .706 |
| TCU | 5 | – | 7 | .417 | 9 | – | 8 | .529 |
| Rice | 3 | – | 9 | .250 | 3 | – | 9 | .250 |
| Baylor | 2 | – | 8 | .200 | 8 | – | 10 | .444 |
| Texas A&M | 1 | – | 9 | .100 | 4 | – | 12 | .250 |

The 1927-28 Baylor Bears basketball team represented the Baylor University during the 1927-28 college men's basketball season.

== Schedule ==
| Date time, TV | Opponent | Result | Record | Site city, state |
|---|---|---|---|---|
| * | North Texas State | L 21-25 | 0-1 | Waco, TX |
| * | North Texas State | W 28-11 | 1-1 | Waco, TX |
| * | Daniel Baker | W 37-34 | 2-1 | Waco, TX |
| * | Daniel Baker | W 29-19 | 3-1 | Waco, TX |
| * | West Texas State | W 31-19 | 4-1 | Waco, TX |
| * | West Texas State | W 38-27 | 5-1 | Waco, TX |
| | at TCU | W 28-27 | 6-1 | Fort Worth, TX |
| | Rice | W 35-31 | 7-1 | Waco, TX |
| | Rice | L 27-37 | 7-2 | Waco, TX |
| | at Texas | L 36-57 | 7-3 | Austin, TX |
| | Arkansas | L 21-59 | 7-4 | Waco, TX |
| | Arkansas | L 21-34 | 7-5 | Waco, TX |
| | Texas | L 28-40 | 7-6 | Waco, TX |
| | SMU | L 31-34 | 7-7 | Waco, TX |
| | TCU | L 17-44 | 7-8 | Waco, TX |
| | at SMU | L 34-39 | 7-9 | Dallas, TX |
| * | Waco YMCA | W 55-18 | 8-9 | Waco, TX |
| * | Austin College | W 55-36 | 9-9 | Waco, TX |
*Non-conference game. (#) Tournament seedings in parentheses.
