= 1919–20 Baylor Bears basketball team =

American college basketball season

1919–20 Baylor Bears men's basketball
- Conference: Southwest Conference
- Record: 8-13 (2-5 SWC)
- Head coach: Charles Mosley

1919–20 Southwest Conference men's basketball standings
	Conf.				Overall
Team	W		L	PCT	W		L	PCT
Texas A&M	16	–	0	1.000	19	–	0	1.000
Phillips	2	–	1	.667	0	–	0	–
Texas	4	–	6	.400	10	–	6	.625
Rice	2	–	5	.286	5	–	6	.455
SMU	2	–	8	.200	4	–	9	.308
Baylor	1	–	7	.125	8	–	13	.381

The 1919-20 Baylor Bears basketball team represented the Baylor University during the 1919-20 college men's basketball season.

== Schedule ==
Date time, TV	Opponent	Result	Record	Site city, state
	Texas A&M	L 20-32	0-1	Waco, TX
	Texas A&M	L 27-36	0-2	Waco, TX
*	Southwestern	L 14-46	0-3	Waco, TX
*	Southwestern	L 28-40	0-4	Waco, TX
*	Howard Payne	L 18-28	0-5	Waco, TX
	Texas	L 11-44	0-6	Waco, TX
*	Southwestern	L 16-28	0-7	Waco, TX
*	Southwestern	W 24-16	1-7	Waco, TX
*	Hardin–Simmons	L 17-39	1-8	Waco, TX
*	Hardin-Simmons	L 28-32	1-9	Waco, TX
	Texas A&M	L 8-28	1-10	Waco, TX
	Texas A&M	L 11-37	1-11	Waco, TX
*	Baylor Medical School	W 29-26	2-11	Waco, TX
*	Austin College	L 22-30	2-12	Waco, TX
*	Austin College	L 18-38	2-13	Waco, TX
	at SMU	W 20-19	3-13	Dallas, TX
*	Austin College	W 26-17	4-13	Waco, TX
*	Austin College	W 25-19	5-13	Waco, TX
*	Baylor Medical School	W 29-26	6-13	Waco, TX
	SMU	W 21-20	7-13	Waco, TX
*	Southwest Texas State	W 49-28	8-13	Waco, TX
*Non-conference game. (#) Tournament seedings in parentheses.
