= Paragould meteorite =

Meteorite found in the United States

Coordinates: 35°59′48.64″N 90°31′21.25″W

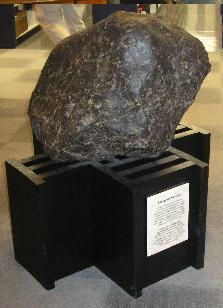
- The Paragould Meteorite on display in Mullins Library at the University of Arkansas in Fayetteville, Arkansas
- Type: Chondrite
- Country: United States
- Region: Finch, Arkansas
- Fall date: 1930-02-17
- TKW: 407 kilograms (897 lb)
- Related media on Wikimedia Commons

The Paragould Meteorite at 41 inches (1,000 mm) by 24 inches (610 mm) by 16 inches (410 mm) and weighing 370 kilograms (820 lb) is the second largest witnessed meteorite fall ever recovered in North America (after the Norton County meteorite) and the largest stony meteorite chondrite. It fell to Earth at approximately 4:08 a.m. on February 17, 1930.

The fireball could be seen as far away as Illinois, Indiana, Missouri, Kansas, and Arkansas. Initially, observers thought it was an airplane crashing.

The meteorite split into many pieces. The largest piece was discovered by W. H. Hodges in an 8-foot (2 m) hole on a farm south of Bethel Church, off Highway 358, a few miles south of Paragould, Arkansas. A smaller piece was found by George W. Hyde in Finch, Arkansas.

It was purchased by Harvey H. Nininger, who in 1930 sold it to Chicago's Field Museum of Natural History. It has been on loan to the University of Arkansas since 1988, initially to the University Museum and then after November 2003 to the Arkansas Center for Space and Planetary Sciences. It was on display in Mullins Library, at the University of Arkansas in Fayetteville till April 11, 2008, when it was moved to the Arkansas Center for Space and Planetary Sciences building. Two other pieces were found, one weighing 33 kilograms (73 lb) (presently stored in Washington, D.C.) and another 3.75 kilograms (8.3 lb) piece presently resides in New York.

== See also ==
- Glossary of meteoritics
