= L. Theo Bellmont =

Biographical details
- Born: September 24, 1881; Rochester, New York, U.S.
- Died: December 27, 1967 (aged 86)
- Education: University of Tennessee

Coaching career (HC unless noted)
- 1914-1915: Texas
- 1921-1922: Texas

Administrative career (AD unless noted)
- 1913-1929: Texas

Head coaching record
- Overall: 58-9

L. Theo Bellmont (September 24, 1881 – December 27, 1967) was an Athletic Director, Professor and Director of Physical Training, and men's basketball head coach at The University of Texas at Austin.

Bellmont was born in Rochester, New York. He attended schools in Rochester before studying at the University of Tennessee, where he earned his LL.B. degree in 1908. From 1908 until 1913 he was secretary of the YMCA in Houston, Texas.

In 1913, the UT board of regents hired Bellmont as the university's first director of athletics, a position that included supervision of intercollegiate athletics, physical training, and intramural sports. His decisions as an athletic director would have wide-ranging implications for the development of intercollegiate athletics at the university and throughout the state of Texas. Bellmont took charge of a Texas athletics program in debt and had the program producing a profit within three years of his hiring. Seeing a need for the larger colleges and universities of the region to organize to further the interests and development of college athletics, he originated and developed the idea of the Southwest Conference and chaired organizational meetings of various colleges and universities in Texas, Oklahoma, and Arkansas until the conference came into existence in 1915. As UT athletic director, Bellmont co-founded the Texas Relays with Clyde Littlefield in 1925; began the tradition of playing the annual Texas-Oklahoma football game in the Cotton Bowl at the State Fair of Texas; founded the UT Intramural Sports program; introduced the idea of a prepayment plan for UT athletics, securing a stable annual income for the athletics program; and designed and implemented the funding program for Memorial Stadium, which was built in 1924.

While athletic director, Bellmont coached the Texas men's basketball team for two two-year periods (1914–15 and 1921–22), finishing with an overall record of 58-9. He directed the Longhorns to 11-0 and 14-0 records in the 1914 and 1915 seasons, respectively, as well as the inaugural Southwest Conference championship during the latter season. Bellmont's first two teams contributed 25 victories to a winning streak that would ultimately grow to 44 games and stand as the NCAA record for consecutive wins in men's basketball for almost 40 years. He led his 1921 and 1922 teams to win–loss records of 13-5 and 20-4, respectively, the latter record representing the Longhorns' first 20-win season.

Bellmont was dismissed as the UT Director of Athletics in 1929, having been undermined by a protracted power struggle following the controversial firing of popular football and basketball head coach E. J. "Doc" Stewart in 1927. He nevertheless continued on as Professor and then Director of Physical Training at UT, retiring as professor and director emeritus in 1957.

Bellmont was named to the Longhorn Hall of Honor in 1957. Bellmont Hall on The University of Texas campus, built in 1972 within the support structure of Texas Memorial Stadium's west side upper deck, was named in his honor.

== Head coaching record ==
Record table
| Season | Team | Overall | Conference | Standing | Postseason |
|---|---|---|---|---|---|
Texas (Independent) (1914)
| 1914 | Texas | 11–0 | | | |
Texas (Southwest Conference) (1915)
| 1915 | Texas | 14–0 | 5–0 | 1st | |
Texas (Southwest Conference) (1921–1922)
| 1921 | Texas | 13–5 | 9–5 | 3rd | |
| 1922 | Texas | 20–4 | 14–4 | 2nd | |
| Texas: | | 58–9 (.866) | 28–9 (.757) | | |
| Total: | | 58–9 (.866) | 28–9 (.757) | | |
National champion Postseason invitational champion Conference regular season champion Conference regular season and conference tournament champion Division regular season champion Division regular season and conference tournament champion Conference tournament champion
