= 1926–27 Baylor Bears basketball team =

American college basketball season

1926–27 Baylor Bears men's basketball
- Conference: Southwest Conference
- Record: 8–4 (0–3 SWC)
- Head coach: Ralph Wolf

1926–27 Southwest Conference men's basketball standings
	Conf.				Overall
Team	W		L	PCT	W		L	PCT
Arkansas	8	–	2	.800	14	–	2	.875
SMU	7	–	4	.636	12	–	5	.706
Texas	7	–	4	.636	13	–	9	.591
TCU	6	–	4	.600	9	–	8	.529
Texas A&M	4	–	6	.400	10	–	7	.588
Baylor	0	–	3	.000	8	–	4	.667
Rice	0	–	9	.000	0	–	9	.000

The 1926–27 Baylor Bears basketball team represented the Baylor University during the 1926–27 college men's basketball season.

== Schedule ==
Date time, TV	Opponent	Result	Record	Site city, state
*	Presbyterian (Ind.)	W 30–16	1–0	Waco, TX
*	Presbyterian (Ind.)	W 27–12	2–0	Waco, TX
*	Forth Worth YMCA	W 32–20	3–0	Waco, TX
*	Southwestern	W 27–15	4–0	Waco, TX
*	North Texas State	W 32–18	5–0	Waco, TX
*	North Texas State	W 28–20	6–0	Waco, TX
*	Forth Worth YMCA	W 32–20	7–0	Waco, TX
*	SUL Ross	W 28–14	8–0	Waco, TX
*	West Texas State	L 15–28	8–1	Waco, TX
	Texas	L 15–22	8–2	Waco, TX
	at SMU	L 27–28	8–3	Dallas, TX
	TCU	L 24–31	8–4	Waco, TX
*Non-conference game. (#) Tournament seedings in parentheses.
