= University of Arkansas Honors College =

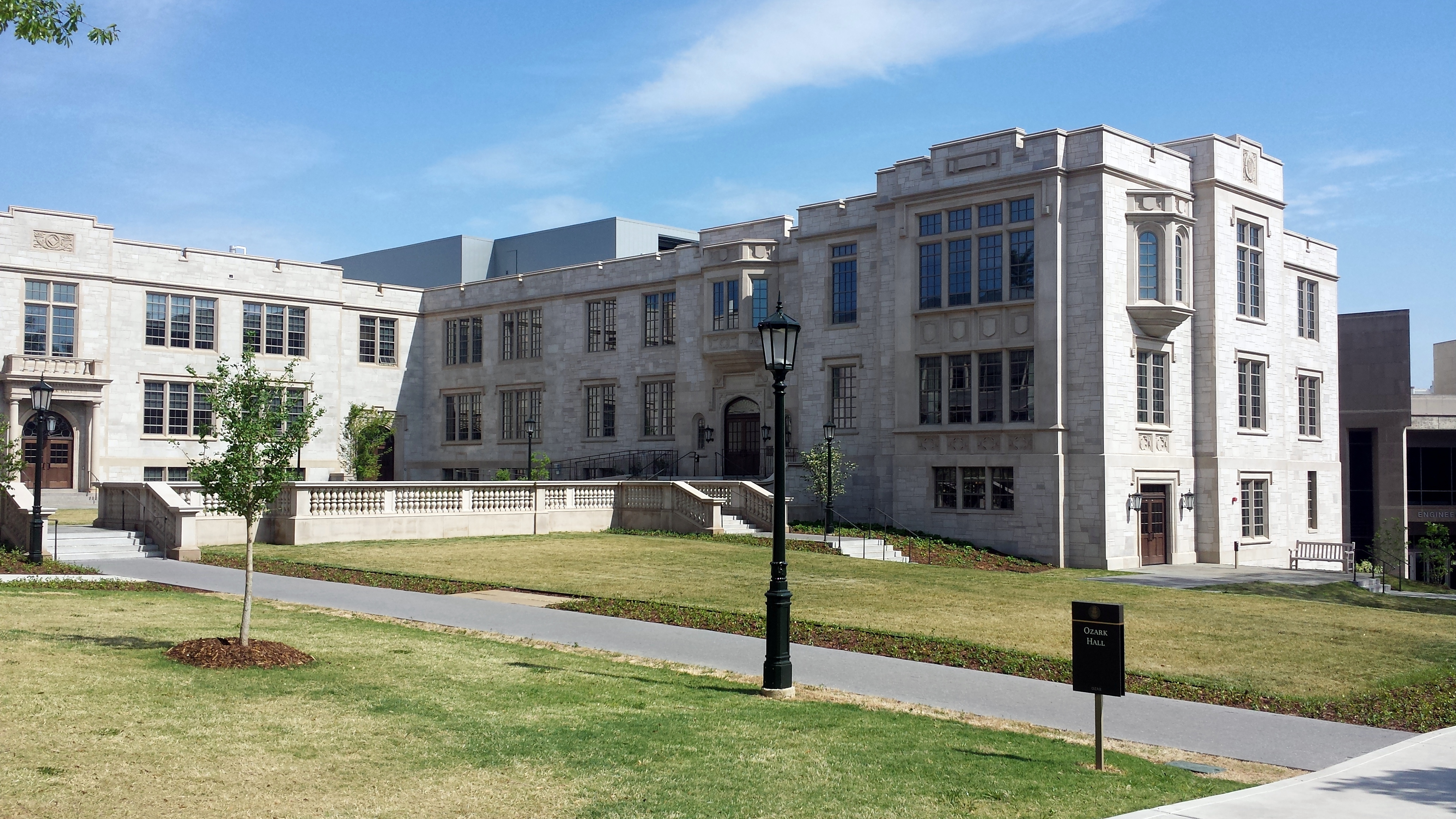
- The University of Arkansas Honors College is housed in Gearhart Hall.
- Type: Public
- Established: 2002
- Parent institution: University of Arkansas
- Endowment: $250 Million
- Dean: Lynda L. Coon
- Students: 3,848 (2021)
- Location: Fayetteville, Arkansas, U.S. 36.0677°N 94.1715°W
- Campus: University of Arkansas
- Website: honorscollege.uark.edu

From 10 to 15% of Arkansas undergraduates participate in the Honors College at the University of Arkansas. Entering freshman for the Honors College have an average score of 30 on the ACT and 4.1 high school GPA. Each year the Honors College awards up to 90 freshman fellowships worth $72,000 over four years and more than $1 million in research, study abroad, service learning and internship grants. The Honors College serves all undergraduate majors.

In April 2002, the Walton Family Charitable Support Foundation donated $300 million to the University of Arkansas. The donation was the largest in the history of public education at that time. After the donation, the Honors College announced its goal to enroll 2,000 Honors College undergraduates by the year 2010. This goal was met three years early. The University of Arkansas also set records for students in a freshman class, total enrollment, and minority enrollment in 2007. The first dean of the University of Arkansas Honors College was Bob McMath, former vice-provost of Georgia Tech. Following McMath's retirement in 2014, Curt Rom served as interim dean. Lynda Coon, professor of history at the University of Arkansas, was appointed dean in 2015.

Under Coon's leadership the Honors College has launched a series of seminar and forum courses taught by professors and community leaders, addressing topics such as blockchain, gene editing, cancer, Presidential elections and Gothic. In response to COVID-19, the Honors College has also offered intersession seminars, Pandemic (2020) and Vaccine (2021), taught by interdisciplinary groups of doctors, scholars and government officials.

In 2014, the Honors College established the Path Program, which recruits, mentors and provides scholarship funding for exceptional students from underrepresented populations. The Path Program has received nearly $2 million in grants to fund scholarships from the National Science Foundation, as well as generous support from private donors. The Honors College Futures Hub, launched in 2021, helps students make the most of their college experience and prepare for their career, post-degree, by offering workshops, programs and one-on-one mentoring sessions with planning professionals.

Honors students at the University of Arkansas Honors College have received numerous honors, scholarships, fellowships, and accolades since the college was established. Honors College students have enjoyed a 90% acceptance rate to medical school and received Gates Cambridge, Rhodes, Madison, Marshall, Fulbright, Boren, Gilman, Truman, Goldwater, and National Science Foundation scholarships. The Honors College is one of only seven universities (including Princeton University, Northwestern University, University of California, Berkeley, Harvard University, Massachusetts Institute of Technology, Yale University, and the United States Military Academy at West Point) to have multiple Gates Cambridge scholarship recipients, ninth ranked overall in Goldwater Scholarship recipients in the United States for the last ten years, and has been a Truman Honor Institution since 2002.

== Study Abroad grants ==
Over forty grants are available to financially aid students who wish to study abroad. Up to $12,000 can be awarded for year-long foreign study.
