= 1923–24 Arkansas Razorbacks men's basketball team =

American college basketball season

1923–24 Arkansas Razorbacks men's basketball
- Conference: Southwest Conference
- Record: 17–11 (3–9 SWC)
- Head coach: Francis Schmidt (1st season)
- Home arena: Schmidt Gymnasium

1923–24 Southwest Conference men's basketball standings
	Conf.				Overall
Team	W		L	PCT	W		L	PCT
Texas	20	–	0	1.000	23	–	0	1.000
TCU	15	–	4	.789	16	–	4	.800
Texas A&M	13	–	10	.565	13	–	10	.565
Oklahoma A&M	9	–	5	.643	14	–	6	.700
Baylor	7	–	17	.292	11	–	23	.324
SMU	7	–	15	.318	9	–	15	.375
Arkansas	3	–	9	.250	17	–	11	.607
Rice	3	–	17	.150	3	–	17	.150

The 1923–24 Arkansas Razorbacks men's basketball team represented the University of Arkansas in the 1923–24 college basketball season. They played their home games in Schmidt Gymnasium. Francis Schmidt coached the Hogs in their first ever basketball season. The Razorbacks went 17–11, with a 3–9 record in Southwest Conference play, finishing seventh in the league.

== Roster ==
1925–26 Arkansas Razorbacks men's basketball roster
Roster retrieved from HogStats.com.
Name	Position	Hometown
Rolla Adams	Forward	Selma, Louisiana
Clifford Blackburn	Guard	Danville, Arkansas
Cyrus King	Forward	Stuttgart, Arkansas
J.C. McGuire	Forward	Piggott, Arkansas
Curtis Parker	Guard	Lawton, Oklahoma
Elbert Pickel	Center	Fayetteville, Arkansas
Boyd Posey	Forward	Hot Springs, Arkansas
Elza Renfro	Guard	Wagoner, Oklahoma
Garland Stubblefield	Forward	Fayetteville, Arkansas

== Schedule and results ==
Schedule retrieved from HogStats.com.

Date time, TV	Rank^{#}	Opponent^{#}	Result	Record	Site city, state
December 19, 1923*		at Northeastern State Teachers College	W 19–13	1–0	Tahlequah, OK
December 20, 1923*		at Northeastern State Teachers College	W 33–19	2–0	Tahlequah, OK
December 21, 1923*		vs. Boynton De Molay	W 48–18	3–0	
December 27, 1923*		vs. Jonesboro YMCA	L 25–38	3–1	Jonesboro, AR
December 29, 1923*		vs. Gay Oil Company	W 34–19	4–1	Little Rock, AR
December 31, 1923*		at North Little Rock High School	W 35–28	5–1	North Side Gymnasium; North Little Rock, AR
January 1, 1924*		vs. Fort Smith Faculty	W 69–8	6–1	Fort Smith, AR
*		Ozark Athletic Club	W 61–36	7–1	
January 4, 1924*		Northeastern State Teachers College	W 43–22	8–1	Schmidt Gymnasium; Fayetteville, AR
January 5, 1924*		Northeastern State Teachers College	W 42–14	9–1	Schmidt Gymnasium; Fayetteville, AR
January 11, 1924*		Arkansas State Normal School	W 62–27	10–1	Schmidt Gymnasium; Fayetteville, AR
January 12, 1924*		Arkansas State Normal School	W 34–14	11–1	Schmidt Gymnasium; Fayetteville, AR
January 18, 1924*		Southwest Missouri State Teachers College	L 31–38	11–2	Schmidt Gymnasium; Fayetteville, AR
January 19, 1924*		Southwest Missouri State Teachers College	W 22–21	12–2	Schmidt Gymnasium; Fayetteville, AR
January 25, 1924		SMU	L 11–17	12–3 (0–1)	Schmidt Gymnasium; Fayetteville, AR
January 26, 1924		SMU	W 21–15	13–3 (1–1)	Schmidt Gymnasium; Fayetteville, AR
February 1, 1924		TCU	L 30–31	13–4 (1–2)	Schmidt Gymnasium; Fayetteville, AR
February 2, 1924		TCU	L 21–23	13–5 (1–3)	Schmidt Gymnasium; Fayetteville, AR
February 8, 1924*		Hendrix College	W 28–18	14–5 (1–3)	Schmidt Gymnasium; Fayetteville, AR
February 9, 1924*		Hendrix College	W 39–21	15–5 (1–3)	Schmidt Gymnasium; Fayetteville, AR
February 18, 1924		at Baylor	L 29–33	15–6 (1–4)	Waco, TX
February 19, 1924		at Baylor	W 28–14	16–6 (2–4)	Waco, TX
February 20, 1924		at Texas A&M	L 27–35	16–7 (2–5)	College Station, TX
February 21, 1924		at Texas A&M	L 17–32	16–8 (2–6)	College Station, TX
February 22, 1924		at Rice	L 19–22	16–9 (2–7)	Houston, TX
February 23, 1924		at Rice	W 29–22	17–9 (3–7)	Houston, TX
February 27, 1924		Texas	L 26–30	17–10 (3–8)	Schmidt Gymnasium; Fayetteville, AR
February 28, 1924		Texas	L 21–32	17–11 (3–9)	Schmidt Gymnasium; Fayetteville, AR
*Non-conference game. (#) Tournament seedings in parentheses.
