= 1954–55 Arkansas Razorbacks men's basketball team =

American college basketball season

1954–55 Arkansas Razorbacks men's basketball
- Conference: Southwest Conference
- Record: 14–9 (8–4 SWC)
- Head coach: Glen Rose (12th season)
- Home arena: Men's Gymnasium

1954–55 Southwest Conference men's basketball standings
	Conf.				Overall
Team	W		L	PCT	W		L	PCT
SMU	9	–	3	.750	15	–	10	.600
TCU	8	–	4	.667	17	–	7	.708
Arkansas	8	–	4	.667	14	–	9	.609
Baylor	7	–	5	.583	13	–	11	.542
Rice	6	–	6	.500	10	–	12	.455
Texas	3	–	9	.250	4	–	20	.167
Texas A&M	1	–	11	.083	4	–	20	.167
Rankings from AP Poll

The 1954–1955 Arkansas Razorbacks men's basketball team represented the University of Arkansas in the 1954–1955 college basketball season. The Hogs were coached by Glen Rose, in his third season of his second stint as head coach of the basketball team and twelfth season overall coaching Arkansas. The Razorbacks played their home games in the Men's Gymnasium, their eighteenth and final season there before moving into what would become known as Barnhill Arena. Arkansas had an overall record of 14–9 with an 8–4 record in Southwest Conference play, finishing in a tie for second place in the league.

== Roster ==
Roster retrieved from HogStats.com and Sports-Reference.com.

1954–55 Arkansas Razorbacks men's basketball team
Players
Coaches

Pos.	#	Name	Height	Weight	Year	Previous school	Hometown
G	38	Jerald Barnett	6 ft 0 in (1.83 m)	—	Jr	Harrison High School	Harrison, Arkansas
F	45	Norman Smith	6 ft 3 in (1.91 m)	—	Sr	N/A	Bucyrus, Ohio
C		Pete Butler	6 ft 4 in (1.93 m)	210 lb (95 kg)	Jr	N/A	Jefferson City, Missouri
	22	Buddy Smith	6 ft 4 in (1.93 m)	—	Jr	DeQueen High School	DeQueen, Arkansas
G	40	Carroll Scroggin	6 ft 2 in (1.88 m)	—	Sr	Center Ridge High School	Center Ridge, Arkansas
F	20	Terry Day	6 ft 4 in (1.93 m)	185 lb (84 kg)	So	Magnolia High School	Magnolia, Arkansas
G	36	Leo McDonald	5 ft 11 in (1.8 m)	165 lb (75 kg)	Sr	N/A	Many, Louisiana
G	17	Joe Kretschmar	5 ft 11 in (1.8 m)	—	Jr	N/A	Jefferson City, Missouri
	25	Joe Telford	6 ft 2 in (1.88 m)	—	Sr	Theodore Roosevelt High School	Des Moines, Iowa
F	11	Joe Dickson	6 ft 3 in (1.91 m)	180 lb (82 kg)	So	Little Rock Central High School	Little Rock, Arkansas
		John Crawford	6 ft 4 in (1.93 m)	—
C	14	Charlie Brown	6 ft 9 in (2.06 m)	220 lb (100 kg)	So	Walnut Ridge High School	Walnut Ridge, Arkansas

Head coach

Glen Rose (Arkansas)

Assistant coach(es)

Legend

- (C) Team captain
- (S) Suspended
- (I) Ineligible
- (W) Walk-on
- Injured
- Current redshirt

Roster
Last update: January 25, 2021

== Schedule and results ==
Date time, TV	Rank^{#}	Opponent^{#}	Result	Record	Site city, state
November 29, 1954*		Northwestern State College	L 68–74	0–1	Men's Gymnasium; Fayetteville, AR
December 8, 1954*		at Oklahoma City	W 81–76 ^{OT}	1–1	Municipal Auditorium; Oklahoma City, OK
December 11, 1954*		at Tulsa	L 47–63	1–2	Expo Square Pavilion; Tulsa, OK
December 15, 1954*		at No. 6 Mizzou	L 58–77	1–3	Brewer Fieldhouse; Columbia, MO
December 17, 1954*		Ole Miss	W 74–64	2–3	Little Rock, AR
December 27, 1954*		vs. Rice; Southwest Conference Tournament	W 73–66	3–3	Houston, TX
December 28, 1954*		vs. Alabama; Southwest Conference Tournament	L 67–84	3–4	Houston, TX
December 29, 1954*		vs. Texas A&M; Southwest Conference Tournament	W 74–70	4–4	Houston, TX
January 1, 1955*		Tulsa	W 68–60	5–4	Men's Gymnasium; Fayetteville, AR
January 4, 1955		TCU	L 62–67	5–5 (0–1)	Men's Gymnasium; Fayetteville, AR
January 8, 1955		at Texas A&M	L 59–62	5–6 (0–2)	G. Rollie White Coliseum; College Station, TX
January 10, 1955		at Rice	W 83–61	6–6 (1–2)	Rice Gymnasium; Houston, TX
January 15, 1955		Baylor	W 73–63	7–6 (2–2)	Men's Gymnasium; Fayetteville, AR
January 26, 1955*		Oklahoma City	W 55–52	8–6 (2–2)	Men's Gymnasium; Fayetteville, AR
January 31, 1955		SMU	W 85–74	9–6 (3–2)	Men's Gymnasium; Fayetteville, AR
February 5, 1955		at Texas	L 74–75 ^{OT}	9–7 (3–3)	Gregory Gymnasium; Austin, TX
February 7, 1955		at Baylor	W 75–72	10–7 (4–3)	Heart O' Texas Fair Coliseum; Waco, TX
February 12, 1955		Rice	W 86–75	11–7 (5–3)	Men's Gymnasium; Fayetteville, AR
February 15, 1955*		at St. Louis	L 72–99	11–8 (5–3)	Kiel Auditorium; St. Louis, MO
February 19, 1955		Texas	W 79–74	12–8 (6–3)	Men's Gymnasium; Fayetteville, AR
February 22, 1955		at SMU	L 69–83	12–9 (6–4)	Perkins Gymnasium; Dallas, TX
February 26, 1955		Texas A&M	W 73–63	13–9 (7–4)	Men's Gymnasium; Fayetteville, AR
March 1, 1955		at TCU	W 110–89	14–9 (8–4)	Fort Worth, TX
*Non-conference game. ^{#}Rankings from AP. (#) Tournament seedings in parentheses. All times are in Central.
