= Milan Creighton =

American football player and coach (1908–1998)

No. 24, 25
- Position: End

Personal information
- Born: January 21, 1908; Gothenburg, Nebraska, U.S.
- Died: May 16, 1998 (aged 90); Hot Springs, Arkansas, U.S.
- Listed height: 6 ft 0 in (1.83 m)
- Listed weight: 190 lb (86 kg)

Career information
- High school: Gothenburg (NE)
- College: Arkansas

Career history

Playing
- Chicago Cardinals (1931–1937)

Coaching
- Chicago Cardinals (1935–1938) Head coach; Hot Springs HS (AR) (1940–1945) Head coach

Awards and highlights
- Arkansas Hall of Honor (2010)
- Coaching profile at Pro Football Reference
- Stats at Pro Football Reference

Milan Standish Creighton (January 21, 1908 – May 16, 1998) was an American football player and coach. He was the head coach for the National Football League's Chicago Cardinals from 1935 to 1938. As the coach of the Cardinals, he compiled a record of 16–26–4 in four seasons and also played seven years for the team.

Prior to his professional career, Creighton played college football at the University of Arkansas, where he earned three letters in football between 1928 and 1930 and served as team captain for the Razorbacks football team in 1930. While also at Arkansas, he also earned three letter as a member of the Razorbacks basketball team between 1929 and 1931, and was a two-time All-Southwestern Conference honoree in 1930 and 1931. In 1931 he was Arkansas' only individual to earn All-Southwest Conference honors.

After leaving the NFL, Creighton coached high school football at Hot Springs High School, where he compiled a record of 47–18–4.

== Head coaching record ==
=== High school ===
Year	Team	Overall	Conference	Standing	Bowl/playoffs
Hot Springs Trojans () (1940–1945)
1940	Hot Springs	9–3–1			
1941	Hot Springs	8–3–1			
1942	Hot Springs	9–1–1			
1943	Hot Springs	7–2–1			
1944	Hot Springs	8–3			
1945	Hot Springs	6–6			
Hot Springs:		47–18–4			
Total:		47–18–4			
