= Wear Schoonover =

American football player (1910–1982)

Profile
- Position: End

Personal information
- Born: March 18, 1910; Pocahontas, Arkansas, U.S.
- Died: May 12, 1982 (aged 72); Arlington, Virginia, U.S.
- Listed height: 6 ft 3 in (1.91 m)
- Listed weight: 190 lb (86 kg)

Career information
- College: Arkansas (1927–1929)

Awards and highlights
- NCAA receptions leader (1929); First-team All-American (1929); All-Southern (1929); 2× First-team All-SWC (1928, 1929); Arkansas Sports Hall of Fame (1959)
- College Football Hall of Fame (Class of 1967)

Wear Kibler Schoonover (March 18, 1910 – May 12, 1982) was an American college football player. He was elected to the College Football Hall of Fame in 1967.

== Playing career ==
He was the first Arkansas Razorback, as well as the first Southwestern football player, to be on the All-American team.

Schoonover is one of five members of the inaugural class of the Arkansas Sports Hall of Fame.

He was one of 11 All-American football players to appear in the 1930 film "Maybe It's Love". After football he spent the majority of his career working for the United States Department of Agriculture.
