= Schmidt Gymnasium =

- Schmidt's Barn, Schmitty's Barn
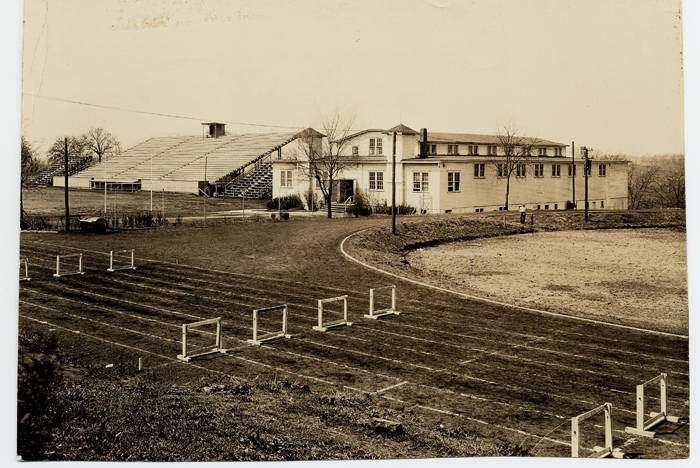
- A photo of Schmidt Gymnasium in the 1930s.
- Interactive map of Schmidt Gymnasium
- Location: Fayetteville, Arkansas, U.S.
- Coordinates: 36°04′06.1″N 94°10′30.6″W
- Elevation: 1,440 ft (440 m)
- Capacity: 1,350

Construction
- Built: 1922
- Closed: 1937

Tenant
- Arkansas Basketball

Schmidt Gymnasium was the home venue of Razorback basketball at the University of Arkansas from 1923 until 1937. Completed prior to the Razorbacks' inaugural season, the gym was a former car showroom and garage that local businessman Jay Fulbright (father of future U.S. Representative, U.S. Senator, University of Arkansas president, and Razorback football player, J. William Fulbright) worked to acquire with Francis Schmidt when Schmidt became athletic director and coach of the basketball, football, and baseball teams in 1922. The wooden gym was made from surplus World War I material and became known as "Schmidt's barn" or "Schmitty's barn" in reference to the coach who started the basketball program and its makeshift nature. Schmidt Gymnasium was built just north of the fine arts building on campus. After the 1936–37 season, the building was sold and moved to Fayetteville High School, before it became a river cabin on Big Piney Creek near Russellville, Arkansas. The Razorbacks then played their basketball games at the Men's Gymnasium from the 1937–38 season until the 1954–55 season.
