= DeWare Field House =

Gymnasium in College Station, Texas

Coordinates: 30.610840°N 96.341893°W

The Charles DeWare Field House was a gymnasium on the campus of Texas A&M University in College Station, Texas. The building was the first gymnasium built on the campus, and served as the home of the men's basketball team from 1924 to 1954, when G. Rollie White Coliseum opened just down the street. It was located on Joe Routt Boulevard, to the northwest of Kyle Field, and was a brick building with a peaked roof, arched windows and wooden bleachers. It was known as Memorial Gymnasium until 1939, when it was renamed for Charles DeWare Sr., Class of 1909, a two-sport letterman and captain of the football and baseball teams in his senior year. The Downs Natatorium was built adjacent and to the southwest of the gymnasium in 1932. Both buildings were demolished in 1997 to make room for the northwest end zone addition to Kyle Field.
