= Texas Longhorns men's basketball, 1920–1929 =

American collegiate basketball team results

== 1919–20 season ==
=== Schedule and results ===
1919–20 Southwest Conference men's basketball standings
	Conf.				Overall
Team	W		L	PCT	W		L	PCT
Texas A&M	16	–	0	1.000	19	–	0	1.000
Phillips	2	–	1	.667	0	–	0	–
Texas	4	–	6	.400	10	–	6	.625
Rice	2	–	5	.286	5	–	6	.455
SMU	2	–	8	.200	4	–	9	.308
Baylor	1	–	7	.125	8	–	13	.381

Coach: Berry M. Whitaker; Overall record: 10–6; Southwest Conference record: 4–6; Southwest Conference standing: 3rd
Date	Opponent	Site	Result	Record
?	Southwest Texas State	UT Men's Gym • Austin, Texas	W 31–11	1–0
?	@ Southwestern	? • Georgetown, Texas	W 27–24	2–0
?	TCU	UT Men's Gym • Austin, Texas	W 29–18	3–0
?	Simmons	UT Men's Gym • Austin, Texas	W 26–9	4–0
?	@ TCU	? • Fort Worth, Texas	W 28–21	5–0
?	@ SMU*	? • Dallas, Texas	L 9–19	5–1
Jan 27	Phillips*	UT Men's Gym • Austin, Texas	W 26–23 ^{OT}	6–1
?	Baylor*	UT Men's Gym • Austin, Texas	W 44–11	7–1
?	Texas A&M*	UT Men's Gym • Austin, Texas	L 15–16	7–2
?	Texas A&M*	UT Men's Gym • Austin, Texas	L 8–15	7–3
?	@ Rice*	? • Houston, Texas	W 20–12	8–3
?	Rice*	UT Men's Gym • Austin, Texas	L 13–24	8–4
?	SMU*	UT Men's Gym • Austin, Texas	W 23–5	9–4
?	Southwestern	UT Men's Gym • Austin, Texas	W 23–12	10–4
?	@ Texas A&M*	? • College Station, Texas	L 9–27	10–5
?	@ Texas A&M*	? • College Station, Texas	L 13–17	10–6
*Southwest Conference Game. ^{OT} indicates overtime.

== 1920–21 season ==
=== Schedule and results ===
Coach: L. Theo Bellmont; Overall record: 13–5; Southwest Conference record: 9–5; Southwest Conference standing: 3rd
Date	Opponent	Site	Result	Record
?	Southwest Texas State	UT Men's Gym • Austin, Texas	W 34–6	1–0
?	Simmons	UT Men's Gym • Austin, Texas	W 25–8	2–0
?	@ SMU*	? • Dallas, Texas	W 21–18	3–0
?	Southwestern	UT Men's Gym • Austin, Texas	W 36–11	4–0
?	@ Baylor*	? • Waco, Texas	W 32–10	5–0
?	@ Baylor*	? • Waco, Texas	L 18–25	5–1
?	Rice*	UT Men's Gym • Austin, Texas	W 32–9	6–1
?	Rice*	UT Men's Gym • Austin, Texas	W 35–13	7–1
?	@ Texas A&M*	? • College Station, Texas	L 5–23	7–2
?	@ Texas A&M*	? • College Station, Texas	W 16–15 ^{OT}	8–2
?	Baylor*	UT Men's Gym • Austin, Texas	L 25–28	8–3
?	Baylor*	UT Men's Gym • Austin, Texas	W 37–19	9–3
?	SMU*	UT Men's Gym • Austin, Texas	W 27–21	10–3
?	@ Southwestern	? • Georgetown, Texas	W 24–15	11–3
?	Rice*	UT Men's Gym • Austin, Texas	W 36–31	12–3
?	Rice*	UT Men's Gym • Austin, Texas	L 22–24	12–4
?	Texas A&M*	UT Men's Gym • Austin, Texas	W 16–13	13–4
?	Texas A&M*	UT Men's Gym • Austin, Texas	L 13–18	13–5
*Southwest Conference Game. ^{OT} indicates overtime.

== 1921–22 season ==
=== Schedule and results ===
Coach: L. Theo Bellmont; Overall record: 20–4; Southwest Conference record: 14–4; Southwest Conference standing: 2nd
Date	Opponent	Site	Result	Record
?	Southwest Texas State	UT Men's Gym • Austin, Texas	W 55–10	1–0
?	Southwest Texas State	UT Men's Gym • Austin, Texas	W 42–15	2–0
Jan 10	Southwestern	UT Men's Gym • Austin, Texas	W 53–20	3–0
Jan 11	Southwestern	UT Men's Gym • Austin, Texas	W 36–19	4–0
?	@ SMU*	? • Dallas, Texas	W 36–17	5–0
?	@ SMU*	? • Dallas, Texas	W 27–15	6–0
?	Baylor*	UT Men's Gym • Austin, Texas	W 45–10	7–0
?	Baylor*	UT Men's Gym • Austin, Texas	W 33–15	8–0
?	Phillips	UT Men's Gym • Austin, Texas	W 40–26	9–0
?	@ Rice*	? • Houston, Texas	W 33–13	10–0
?	@ Rice*	? • Houston, Texas	W 29–12	11–0
?	SMU*	UT Men's Gym • Austin, Texas	W 31–18	12–0
?	SMU*	UT Men's Gym • Austin, Texas	W 32–12	13–0
?	Texas A&M*	UT Men's Gym • Austin, Texas	L 17–20	13–1
?	Texas A&M*	UT Men's Gym • Austin, Texas	L 16–25	13–2
?	Trinity	UT Men's Gym • Austin, Texas	W 63–8	14–2
Feb 10	@ Baylor*	? • Waco, Texas	W 30–25	15–2
Feb 11	@ Baylor*	? • Waco, Texas	L 26–35	15–3
?	Oklahoma A&M*	UT Men's Gym • Austin, Texas	W 38–13	16–3
?	Oklahoma A&M*	UT Men's Gym • Austin, Texas	W 28–8	17–3
?	Rice*	UT Men's Gym • Austin, Texas	W 21–8	18–3
?	Rice*	UT Men's Gym • Austin, Texas	W 36–11	19–3
?	@ Texas A&M*	? • College Station, Texas	W 19–11	20–3
?	@ Texas A&M*	? • College Station, Texas	L 8–20	20–4
*Southwest Conference Game.

== 1922–23 season ==
=== Schedule and results ===
Coach: Milton Romney; Overall record: 11–7; Southwest Conference record: 9–7; Southwest Conference standing: 2nd
Date	Opponent	Site	Result	Record
Jan 8	Southwestern	UT Men's Gym • Austin, Texas	W 29–13	1–0
Jan 9	Southwestern	UT Men's Gym • Austin, Texas	W 31–16	2–0
Jan 13	Oklahoma A&M*	UT Men's Gym • Austin, Texas	L 27–28	2–1
Jan 20	@ Oklahoma A&M*	? • Stillwater, Oklahoma	W 34–19	3–1
Jan 26	Baylor*	UT Men's Gym • Austin, Texas	W 35–18	4–1
Jan 27	Baylor*	UT Men's Gym • Austin, Texas	W 23–7	5–1
Feb 2	@ Texas A&M*	? • College Station, Texas	L 21–27	5–2
Feb 3	@ Texas A&M*	? • College Station, Texas	L 25–42	5–3
Feb 7	Rice*	UT Men's Gym • Austin, Texas	W 36–17	6–3
Feb 8	Rice*	UT Men's Gym • Austin, Texas	W 24–17	7–3
Feb 10	SMU*	UT Men's Gym • Austin, Texas	W 29–16	8–3
Feb 16	@ Baylor*	? • Waco, Texas	W 23–18	9–3
Feb 17	@ Baylor*	? • Waco, Texas	L 19–21	9–4
Feb 23	@ Rice*	? • Houston, Texas	L 21–29	9–5
Feb 24	@ Rice*	? • Houston, Texas	L 26–33	9–6
Mar 2	@ SMU*	? • Dallas, Texas	W 25–15	10–6
Mar 5	Texas A&M*	UT Men's Gym • Austin, Texas	L 13–16	10–7
Mar 6	Texas A&M*	UT Men's Gym • Austin, Texas	W 18–12	11–7
*Southwest Conference Game.

== 1923–24 season ==
=== Schedule and results ===
1923–24 Southwest Conference men's basketball standings
	Conf.				Overall
Team	W		L	PCT	W		L	PCT
Texas	20	–	0	1.000	23	–	0	1.000
TCU	15	–	4	.789	16	–	4	.800
Texas A&M	13	–	10	.565	13	–	10	.565
Oklahoma A&M	9	–	5	.643	14	–	6	.700
Baylor	7	–	17	.292	11	–	23	.324
SMU	7	–	15	.318	9	–	15	.375
Arkansas	3	–	9	.250	17	–	11	.607
Rice	3	–	17	.150	3	–	17	.150

Coach: E.J. “Doc” Stewart; Overall record: 23–0; Southwest Conference record: 20–0; Southwest Conference standing: 1st
Date	Opponent	Site	Result	Record
Jan 9	Southwestern	UT Men's Gym • Austin, Texas	W 3–2	1–0
Jan 10	Southwestern	UT Men's Gym • Austin, Texas	W 20–16	2–0
Jan 11	Southwestern	UT Men's Gym • Austin, Texas	W 21–17	3–0
Jan 15	Oklahoma A&M*	UT Men's Gym • Austin, Texas	W 16–14	4–0
Jan 16	Oklahoma A&M*	UT Men's Gym • Austin, Texas	W 22–15	5–0
Jan 18	@ Rice*	? • Houston, Texas	W 32–14	6–0
Jan 19	@ Rice*	? • Houston, Texas	W 40–22	7–0
Jan 25	@ Baylor*	? • Waco, Texas	W 19–10	8–0
Jan 26	@ Baylor*	? • Waco, Texas	W 17–10	9–0
Feb 1	Texas A&M*	UT Men's Gym • Austin, Texas	W 33–22	10–0
Feb 2	Texas A&M*	UT Men's Gym • Austin, Texas	W 27–16	11–0
Feb 8	Rice*	UT Men's Gym • Austin, Texas	W 38–10	12–0
Feb 9	Rice*	UT Men's Gym • Austin, Texas	W 32–9	13–0
Feb 15	Baylor*	UT Men's Gym • Austin, Texas	W 22–12	14–0
Feb 16	Baylor*	UT Men's Gym • Austin, Texas	W 27–24	15–0
Feb 22	SMU*	UT Men's Gym • Austin, Texas	W 19–13	16–0
Feb 23	SMU*	UT Men's Gym • Austin, Texas	W 15–11	17–0
Feb 26	@ Arkansas*	? • Fayetteville, Arkansas	W 30–26	18–0
Feb 27	@ Arkansas*	? • Fayetteville, Arkansas	W 32–21	19–0
Feb 29	@ SMU*	? • Dallas, Texas	W 17–9	20–0
Mar 1	@ SMU*	? • Dallas, Texas	W 29–13	21–0
Mar 7	@ Texas A&M*	? • College Station, Texas	W 24–14	22–0
Mar 8	@ Texas A&M*	? • College Station, Texas	W 17–11	23–0
*Southwest Conference Game.

== 1924–25 season ==
=== Schedule and results ===
Coach: E.J. “Doc” Stewart; Overall record: 17–8; Southwest Conference record: 9–5; Southwest Conference standing: 4th
Date	Opponent	Site	Result	Record
n/a^{#}	@ Hebrew Association	? • Dallas, Texas	L 15–21	0–1
n/a	@ Boethians	? • Dallas, Texas	W 19–14	1–1
n/a	@ Stowe's All-Stars	? • Dallas, Texas	W 24–19	2–1
n/a	@ Boethians	? • Dallas, Texas	W 19–11	3–1
n/a	@ Strickle Lumber Co.	? • Dallas, Texas	L 18–26	3–2
n/a	@ Boethians	? • Dallas, Texas	W 21–16	4–2
n/a	@ Hebrew Association	? • Dallas, Texas	W 19–11	5–2
n/a	@ Strickle Lumber Co.	? • Dallas, Texas	L 21–25	5–3
n/a	@ Ragland All-Stars	? • Dallas, Texas	W 29–14	6–3
Jan 7	TCU*	UT Men's Gym • Austin, Texas	W 14–13	7–3
Jan 9	Southwestern	UT Men's Gym • Austin, Texas	W 16–14	8–3
Jan 10	Southwestern	UT Men's Gym • Austin, Texas	W 20–10	9–3
Jan 16	@ Oklahoma A&M*	? • Stillwater, Oklahoma	L 10–46	9–4
Jan 17	@ Oklahoma A&M*	? • Stillwater, Oklahoma	L 15–25	9–5
Jan 19	@ SMU*	? • Dallas, Texas	L 26–31	9–6
Jan 31	Baylor*	UT Men's Gym • Austin, Texas	W 31–21	10–6
Feb 6	SMU*	UT Men's Gym • Austin, Texas	W 16–15	11–6
Feb 9	@ TCU*	? • Fort Worth, Texas	L 12–31	11–7
Feb 10	@ Baylor*	? • Waco, Texas	W 19–16	12–7
Feb 14	@ Rice*	? • Houston, Texas	W 20–16	13–7
Feb 16	@ Texas A&M*	? • College Station, Texas	L 14–21	13–8
Feb 20	Arkansas*	UT Men's Gym • Austin, Texas	W 20–18	14–8
Feb 21	Arkansas*	UT Men's Gym • Austin, Texas	W 21–12	15–8
Feb 24	Rice*	UT Men's Gym • Austin, Texas	W 28–13	16–8
Feb 28	Texas A&M*	UT Men's Gym • Austin, Texas	W 17–13	17–8
^{#}First nine games played over Christmas holidays in Dallas; no record of game dates. *Southwest Conference Game.

== 1925–26 season ==
1925–26 Southwest Conference men's basketball standings
	Conf.				Overall
Team	W		L	PCT	W		L	PCT
Arkansas	11	–	1	.917	23	–	2	.920
SMU	8	–	4	.667	10	–	6	.625
TCU	7	–	5	.583	13	–	9	.591
Texas	6	–	6	.500	12	–	10	.545
Baylor	5	–	7	.417	8	–	7	.533
Texas A&M	4	–	8	.333	8	–	9	.471
Rice	1	–	11	.083	1	–	13	.071

=== Schedule and results ===
Coach: E.J. “Doc” Stewart; Overall record: 12–10; Southwest Conference record: 6–6; Southwest Conference standing: 4th
Date	Opponent	Site	Result	Record
Dec 18	St. Edward's	UT Men's Gym • Austin, Texas	W 25–17	1–0
Dec 19	St. Edward's	UT Men's Gym • Austin, Texas	L 20–21	1–1
Dec 31	vs. Sul Ross	? • San Antonio, Texas	L 18–22	1–2
Jan 2	vs. Sul Ross	? • San Antonio, Texas	L 22–25	1–3
Jan 5	St. Edward's	UT Men's Gym • Austin, Texas	W 27–16	2–3
Jan 6	St. Edward's	UT Men's Gym • Austin, Texas	L 13–25	2–4
Jan 8	Southwestern	UT Men's Gym • Austin, Texas	W 24–20	3–4
Jan 9	Southwestern	UT Men's Gym • Austin, Texas	W 21–14	4–4
Jan 12	TCU*	UT Men's Gym • Austin, Texas	L 16–20	4–5
Jan 16	@ Rice*	? • Houston, Texas	L 17–22	4–6
Jan 19	SMU*	UT Men's Gym • Austin, Texas	W 28–20	5–6
Jan 22	Centenary	UT Men's Gym • Austin, Texas	W 24–18	6–6
Jan 23	Centenary	UT Men's Gym • Austin, Texas	W 23–15	7–6
Jan 30	Baylor*	UT Men's Gym • Austin, Texas	L 22–29	7–7
Feb 5	@ Arkansas*	? • Fayetteville, Arkansas	L 12–35	7–8
Feb 6	@ Arkansas*	? • Fayetteville, Arkansas	L 7–27	7–9
Feb 8	@ SMU*	? • Dallas, Texas	L 19–26	7–10
Feb 12	Texas A&M*	UT Men's Gym • Austin, Texas	W 35–27	8–10
Feb 16	@ Baylor*	? • Waco, Texas	W 22–19	9–10
Feb 19	@ TCU*	? • Fort Worth, Texas	W 23–21	10–10
Feb 23	Rice*	UT Men's Gym • Austin, Texas	W 27–9	11–10
Feb 26	@ Texas A&M*	? • College Station, Texas	W 32–19	12–10
*Southwest Conference Game.

== 1926–27 season ==
=== Schedule and results ===
1926–27 Southwest Conference men's basketball standings
	Conf.				Overall
Team	W		L	PCT	W		L	PCT
Arkansas	8	–	2	.800	14	–	2	.875
SMU	7	–	4	.636	12	–	5	.706
Texas	7	–	4	.636	13	–	9	.591
TCU	6	–	4	.600	9	–	8	.529
Texas A&M	4	–	6	.400	10	–	7	.588
Baylor	0	–	3	.000	8	–	4	.667
Rice	0	–	9	.000	0	–	9	.000

Coach: E.J. “Doc” Stewart; Overall record: 13–9; Southwest Conference record: 7–4; Southwest Conference standing: T-2nd
Date	Opponent	Site	Result	Record
Dec 17	St. Edward's	UT Men's Gym • Austin, Texas	L 22–29	0–1
Dec 18	St. Edward's	UT Men's Gym • Austin, Texas	W 33–23	1–1
Dec 21	Hillyard	UT Men's Gym • Austin, Texas	L 23–28	1–2
Dec 22	Hillyard	UT Men's Gym • Austin, Texas	L 25–27	1–3
Dec 30	SW Oklahoma Teachers	UT Men's Gym • Austin, Texas	W 26–21	2–3
Jan 1	SW Oklahoma Teachers	UT Men's Gym • Austin, Texas	W 29–27	3–3
Jan 4	SW Oklahoma Teachers	UT Men's Gym • Austin, Texas	L 17–28	3–4
Jan 6	West Texas (???)	UT Men's Gym • Austin, Texas	L 36–41	3–5
Jan 8	@ Baylor*	? • Waco, Texas	W 22–16	4–5
Jan 11	TCU*	UT Men's Gym • Austin, Texas	L 24–28	4–6
Jan 14	Southwestern	UT Men's Gym • Austin, Texas	W 33–27	5–6
Jan 17	Rice*	UT Men's Gym • Austin, Texas	W 28–19	6–6
Jan 19	Southwestern	UT Men's Gym • Austin, Texas	W 31–14	7–6
Jan 29	@ Texas A&M*	? • College Station, Texas	L 35–36	7–7
Feb 2	@ Rice*	? • Houston, Texas	W 30–24	8–7
Feb 4	Arkansas*	UT Men's Gym • Austin, Texas	W 32–29	9–7
Feb 5	Arkansas*	UT Men's Gym • Austin, Texas	W 28–24	10–7
Feb 10	@ TCU*	? • Fort Worth, Texas	L 27–32	10–8
Feb 12	@ SMU*	? • Dallas, Texas	L 23–25	10–9
Feb 14	St. Edward's	UT Men's Gym • Austin, Texas	W 41–29	11–9
Feb 19	SMU*	UT Men's Gym • Austin, Texas	W 25–23	12–9
Feb 26	Texas A&M*	UT Men's Gym • Austin, Texas	W 39–27	13–9
*Southwest Conference Game.

== 1927–28 season ==
=== Schedule and results ===
1927–28 Southwest Conference men's basketball standings
	Conf.				Overall
Team	W		L	PCT	W		L	PCT
Arkansas	12	–	0	1.000	19	–	1	.950
SMU	10	–	2	.833	14	–	3	.824
Texas	7	–	5	.583	12	–	5	.706
TCU	5	–	7	.417	9	–	8	.529
Rice	3	–	9	.250	3	–	9	.250
Baylor	2	–	8	.200	8	–	10	.444
Texas A&M	1	–	9	.100	4	–	12	.250

Coach: Fred Walker; Overall record: 12–5; Southwest Conference record: 7–5; Southwest Conference standing: 3rd
Date	Opponent	Site	Result	Record
Dec 16	St. Edward's	UT Men's Gym • Austin, Texas	W 33–8	1–0
Dec 19	Academía Americana	UT Men's Gym • Austin, Texas	W 80–10	2–0
Jan 3	West Texas (???)	UT Men's Gym • Austin, Texas	W 41–33	3–0
Jan 7	SMU*	UT Men's Gym • Austin, Texas	L 23–39	3–1
Jan 13	@ Arkansas*	? • Fayetteville, Arkansas	L 26–42	3–2
Jan 14	@ Arkansas*	? • Fayetteville, Arkansas	L 29–59	3–3
Jan 18	St. Edward's	UT Men's Gym • Austin, Texas	W 71–21	4–3
Jan 21	Rice*	UT Men's Gym • Austin, Texas	W 37–27	5–3
Jan 25	Southwestern	UT Men's Gym • Austin, Texas	W 48–41	6–3
Jan 30	Baylor*	UT Men's Gym • Austin, Texas	W 57–36	7–3
Feb 1	@ Rice*	? • Houston, Texas	W 36–34	8–3
Feb 4	Texas A&M*	UT Men's Gym • Austin, Texas	W 51–30	9–3
Feb 11	@ Baylor*	? • Waco, Texas	W 40–25	10–3
Feb 18	@ SMU*	? • Dallas, Texas	L 25–44	10–4
Feb 20	@ TCU*	? • Fort Worth, Texas	W 39–32	11–4
Feb 28	TCU*	UT Men's Gym • Austin, Texas	L 25–29	11–5
Mar 3	@ Texas A&M*	? • College Station, Texas	W 30–20	12–5
*Southwest Conference Game.

== 1928–29 season ==
=== Schedule and results ===
1928–29 Southwest Conference men's basketball standings
	Conf.				Overall
Team	W		L	PCT	W		L	PCT
Arkansas	11	–	1	.917	19	–	1	.950
Texas	10	–	2	.833	18	–	2	.900
SMU	6	–	6	.500	7	–	9	.438
TCU	5	–	7	.417	10	–	7	.588
Texas A&M	4	–	6	.400	12	–	6	.667
Baylor	2	–	8	.200	7	–	9	.438
Rice	2	–	10	.167	2	–	10	.167

Coach: Fred Walker; Overall record: 18–2; Southwest Conference record: 10–2; Southwest Conference standing: 2nd
Date	Opponent	Site	Result	Record
Dec 14	St. Mary's (Texas)	Texas School for the Deaf Gym • Austin, Texas	W 50–30	1–0
Dec 21	Southwest Texas State	Texas School for the Deaf Gym • Austin, Texas	W 45–16	2–0
Dec 22	Southwest Texas State	Texas School for the Deaf Gym • Austin, Texas	W 27–18	3–0
Jan 1	San Antonio Elks	Texas School for the Deaf Gym • Austin, Texas	W 73–36	4–0
Jan 4	Daniel Baker	Texas School for the Deaf Gym • Austin, Texas	W 60–28	5–0
Jan 5	Daniel Baker	Texas School for the Deaf Gym • Austin, Texas	W 39–35	6–0
Jan 9	SW Oklahoma Teachers	Texas School for the Deaf Gym • Austin, Texas	W 42–28	7–0
Jan 11	@ Baylor*	? • Waco, Texas	W 22–19	8–0
Jan 16	St. Edward's	Texas School for the Deaf Gym • Austin, Texas	W 41–27	9–0
Jan 19	SMU*	Texas School for the Deaf Gym • Austin, Texas	W 29–19	10–0
Jan 28	Rice*	Texas School for the Deaf Gym • Austin, Texas	W 28–19	11–0
Feb 2	@ TCU*	? • Fort Worth, Texas	W 33–27	12–0
Feb 4	@ SMU*	? • Dallas, Texas	L 32–33	12–1
Feb 8	Arkansas*	Texas School for the Deaf Gym • Austin, Texas	L 32–48	12–2
Feb 9	Arkansas*	Texas School for the Deaf Gym • Austin, Texas	W 36–25	13–2
Feb 16	@ Texas A&M*	? • College Station, Texas	W 32–29	14–2
Feb 19	Baylor*	Texas School for the Deaf Gym • Austin, Texas	W 57–23	15–2
Feb 23	TCU*	Texas School for the Deaf Gym • Austin, Texas	W 42–28	16–2
Feb 26	@ Rice*	? • Houston, Texas	W 33–32	17–2
Mar 2	Texas A&M*	Texas School for the Deaf Gym • Austin, Texas	W 42–31	18–2
*Southwest Conference Game.
