= Glen Rose =

American college sports coach (1905–1994)

Biographical details
- Born: April 23, 1905; Siloam Springs, Arkansas, U.S.
- Died: September 3, 1994 (aged 89); Fayetteville, Arkansas, U.S.

Playing career

Football
- 1925–1927: Arkansas

Basketball
- 1925–1928: Arkansas

Baseball
- 1927–1928: Arkansas

Coaching career (HC unless noted)

Football
- 1942: Camp Grant
- 1944–1945: Arkansas

Basketball
- 1929–1932: Arkansas (assistant)
- 1933–1942: Arkansas
- 1948–1952: Stephen F. Austin
- 1952–1966: Arkansas

Administrative career (AD unless noted)
- 1944–1946: Arkansas

Head coaching record
- Overall: 12–17–1 (football); 381–236 (basketball)
- Tournaments: Basketball; 1–3 (NCAA / NCAA University Division)

Accomplishments and honors

Championships
- Basketball; 6 SWC (1935, 1936, 1938, 1941, 1942, 1958); 1 LSC (1949)

Glen Rose (April 23, 1905 – September 3, 1994) was an American college football and college basketball coach. He served as the head basketball coach at the University of Arkansas from 1933 to 1942 and again from 1952 to 1966, as well as the head football coach at the school for two seasons during World War II (1944–1945). Rose was also the head basketball coach at Stephen F. Austin College from 1948 to 1952.

Rose was born on April 23, 1905, Siloam Springs, Arkansas. He grew up in Little Rock, Arkansas. Rose died on September 3, 1994, at Fayetteville City Hospital in Fayetteville, Arkansas, following several months of declining health.

== Basketball ==
Rose played basketball for the Arkansas Razorbacks and was selected All-Southwest Conference from 1926 to 1928, and as an All-American in 1928. After his playing days ended, he served as assistant coach from 1929 to 1932.

In 1932, Rose became head coach at Arkansas and led the team from 1933 to 1942, winning five Southwest Conference titles. He coached at Stephen F. Austin College for four seasons from 1948 to 1952, before returning to Arkansas for 14 more seasons from 1952 to 1966.

Rose compiled a record of 325–201 at Arkansas and 56–35 at Stephen F. Austin.

== Football ==
In 1944, Rose received a medical discharge from the United States Army and returned to Arkansas as head football coach and athletic director. He resigned after a poor 1945 season and was replaced by John Barnhill.

== Head coaching record ==
=== Football ===
Year	Team	Overall	Conference	Standing	Bowl/playoffs
Camp Grant Warriors (Independent) (1942)
1942	Camp Grant	4–5			
Camp Grant:		4–5			
Arkansas Razorbacks (Southwest Conference) (1944–1945)
1944	Arkansas	5–5–1	2–2–1	3rd	
1945	Arkansas	3–7	1–5	7th	
Arkansas:		8–12–1	3–7–1		
Total:		12–17–1			

=== Basketball ===
Record table
Season	Team	Overall	Conference	Standing	Postseason
Arkansas Razorbacks (Southwest Conference) (1933–1942)
1933–34	Arkansas	16–8	6–6	T–3rd	
1934–35	Arkansas	14–5	9–3	T–1st	
1935–36	Arkansas	24–3	11–1	1st	
1936–37	Arkansas	12–6	8–4	2nd	
1937–38	Arkansas	19–3	11–1	1st	
1938–39	Arkansas	18–5	9–3	2nd	
1939–40	Arkansas	12–10	6–6	4th	
1940–41	Arkansas	20–3	12–0	1st	NCAA final Four
1941–42	Arkansas	19–4	10–2	T–1st	
Arkansas:		154–47 (.766)	82–26 (.759)		
Stephen F. Austin Lumberjacks (Lone Star Conference) (1948–1952)
1948–49	Stephen F. Austin	15–5	9–3	1st	
1949–50	Stephen F. Austin	8–16	4–8		
1950–51	Stephen F. Austin	13–10	8–2		
1951–52	Stephen F. Austin	20–4	8–2		
Stephen F. Austin:		56–35 (.615)	27–15 (.643)		
Arkansas Razorbacks (Southwest Conference) (1952–1966)
1952–53	Arkansas	10–11	4–8	T–5th	
1953–54	Arkansas	13–9	6–6	T–3rd	
1954–55	Arkansas	14–9	8–4	T–2nd	
1955–56	Arkansas	11–12	9–3	2nd	
1956–57	Arkansas	11–12	5–7	5th	
1957–58	Arkansas	17–10	9–5	T–1st	NCAA University Division Regional Fourth Place
1958–59	Arkansas	9–14	6–8	T–5th	
1959–60	Arkansas	12–11	7–7	T–4th	
1960–61	Arkansas	16–7	9–5	3rd	
1961–62	Arkansas	14–10	5–9	6th	
1962–63	Arkansas	13–11	8–6	4th	
1963–64	Arkansas	9–14	6–8	6th	
1964–65	Arkansas	9–14	5–9	5th	
1965–66	Arkansas	13–10	7–7	T–4th	
Arkansas:		171–154 (.526)	94–92 (.505)		
Total:		381–236 (.618)			
National champion Postseason invitational champion Conference regular season champion Conference regular season and conference tournament champion Division regular season champion Division regular season and conference tournament champion Conference tournament champion

== See also ==
- List of NCAA Division I men's basketball tournament Final Four appearances by coach
