= Francis Schmidt =

American football player and sports coach (1885–1944)

- Schmidt, circa 1920

Biographical details
- Born: December 3, 1885; Downs, Kansas, U.S.
- Died: September 19, 1944 (aged 58); Spokane, Washington, U.S.

Playing career
- 1905: Nebraska

Coaching career (HC unless noted)

Football
- 1915–1916: Kendall (assistant)
- 1919–1921: Kendall/Tulsa
- 1922–1928: Arkansas
- 1929–1933: TCU
- 1934–1940: Ohio State
- 1941–1942: Idaho

Basketball
- 1915–1917: Kendall
- 1918–1922: Kendall/Tulsa
- 1923–1929: Arkansas
- 1929–1934: TCU

Baseball
- 1923–1929: Arkansas

Administrative career (AD unless noted)
- 1922–1929: Arkansas

Head coaching record
- Overall: 157–58–11 (football); 258–72 (basketball); 38–64 (baseball)

Accomplishments and honors

Championships
- 2 OIC (1919, 1920); 2 SWC (1929, 1932); 2 Big Ten (1935, 1939)
- College Football Hall of Fame; Inducted in 1971 (profile)

Francis Albert Schmidt (December 3, 1885 – September 19, 1944) was an American football player and coach of football, basketball, and baseball. He served as the head football coach at the University of Tulsa (1919–1921), the University of Arkansas (1922–1928), Texas Christian University (1929–1933), Ohio State University (1934–1940), and the University of Idaho (1941–1942), compiling a career college football head coaching record of 157–58–11 (.719).

Schmidt's teams were known for trick plays involving multiple laterals and non-standard tackle-eligible, and even guard-eligible, formations. The press labeled Schmidt's approach as the "razzle-dazzle offense". Because Schmidt's teams were known for high scoring, the media nicknamed him Francis "Close the Gates of Mercy" Schmidt. Schmidt was inducted into the College Football Hall of Fame as a coach in 1971.

Schmidt also served as the head basketball coach at Tulsa (1915–1917, 1918–1922), Arkansas (1923–1929), and Texas Christian (1929–1934), compiling a career record of 258–72 (.782), and the head baseball coach at Arkansas (1923–1929), tallying a mark of 38–64 (.373).

== Playing career and education ==
Schmidt was born in Downs, Kansas, and played college football at the University of Nebraska. He earned a varsity letter with the Nebraska Cornhuskers in 1905 and received a Juris Doctor degree from the University of Nebraska College of Law a few years later.

== Coaching career ==
From 1915 through 1916, Schmidt joined the football coaching staff as an assistant at the University of Tulsa. World War I, however, interrupted Schmidt's coaching career. He served in the United States Army and rose to the rank of captain. Schmidt was hired as the Tulsa head football coach in 1919. In his first season, Tulsa finished with a record of 8–0–1 and outscored its opponents 592–27. Schmidt's record at Tulsa was 24–3–2 in three seasons. Schmidt had defeated Arkansas by a score of 63–7 in 1919, and the Razorbacks hired Schmidt away from Tulsa in 1922. In seven years at Arkansas (1922–1928), his record was 41–21–3. While at Arkansas, he was also the coach of the basketball and baseball teams; it was not uncommon during that time for coaches at major universities to coach more than one sport.

Schmidt's most memorable years, however, were at Texas Christian and Ohio State. In five years at TCU (1929–1933), he won two Southwest Conference championships and had a record of 47–6–5 (.853). In seven seasons at Ohio State (1934–1940), Schmidt won two Big Ten Conference titles and was 39–16–1 (.705).

Schmidt's most notable contribution to popular culture came in his first year at Ohio State. The Columbus press asked Schmidt about the team's chances of beating rival Michigan. Schmidt replied, "Those fellows put their pants on one leg at a time, the same as everyone else." This phrase had previously been a Texas regionalism, but because of the press attention given to Schmidt, it soon became an internationally known cliché. Ohio State beat Michigan the first four years Schmidt coached there. Since that time, any Ohio State player that defeats Michigan is awarded a "Gold Pants Charm", a gold lapel pin shaped like football pants.

Schmidt finished his football coaching career with a two-year stint at Idaho (1941–1942), then a member of the Pacific Coast Conference, with a 7–12 record. With male civilian enrollment extremely curtailed due to World War II, Idaho (and four of the five other northern division teams) discontinued football before the 1943 season.

== Photography ==
Schmidt was an amateur photographer and recorded the Tulsa race massacre. Eleven of these photographs can be found in the Department of Special Collections, McFarlin Library, The University of Tulsa.

== Death ==
While still living in Moscow, Schmidt's health began to fail in the spring of 1944. He spent his last three weeks at St. Luke's Hospital in Spokane, Washington, where he died on September 19 at age 58. He was buried in Kansas, at Riverview Cemetery in Arkansas City.

== Head coaching record ==
=== Football ===
| Year | Team | Overall | Conference | Standing | Bowl/playoffs | AP^{#} |
|---|---|---|---|---|---|---|
Kendall / Tulsa Orange and Black (Oklahoma Intercollegiate Conference) (1919–1921)
| 1919 | Kendall | 8–0–1 | 5–0–1 | 1st | | |
| 1920 | Kendall | 10–0–1 | 6–0–1 | 1st | | |
| 1921 | Tulsa | 6–3 | 5–1 | 2nd | | |
| Tulsa: | | 24–3–2 | 16–1–2 | | | |
Arkansas Razorbacks (Southwest Conference) (1922–1928)
| 1922 | Arkansas | 4–5 | 1–3 | 6th | | |
| 1923 | Arkansas | 6–2–1 | 2–2 | T–4th | | |
| 1924 | Arkansas | 7–2–1 | 1–2–1 | 7th | | |
| 1925 | Arkansas | 4–4–1 | 1–2–1 | T–5th | | |
| 1926 | Arkansas | 5–5 | 2–2 | T–3rd | | |
| 1927 | Arkansas | 8–1 | 2–1 | 3rd | | |
| 1928 | Arkansas | 7–2 | 2–1 | 2nd | | |
| Arkansas: | | 41–21–3 | 11–13–2 | | | |
TCU Horned Frogs (Southwest Conference) (1929–1933)
| 1929 | TCU | 9–0–1 | 4–0–1 | 1st | | |
| 1930 | TCU | 9–2–1 | 4–2 | 3rd | | |
| 1931 | TCU | 9–2–1 | 4–1–1 | 2nd | | |
| 1932 | TCU | 10–0–1 | 6–0 | 1st | | |
| 1933 | TCU | 9–2–1 | 4–2 | T–2nd | | |
| TCU: | | 46–6–5 | 22–5–2 | | | |
Ohio State Buckeyes (Big Ten Conference) (1934–1940)
| 1934 | Ohio State | 7–1 | 5–1 | 2nd | | |
| 1935 | Ohio State | 7–1 | 5–0 | T–1st | | |
| 1936 | Ohio State | 5–3 | 4–1 | T–2nd | | |
| 1937 | Ohio State | 6–2 | 5–1 | 2nd | | 13 |
| 1938 | Ohio State | 4–3–1 | 2–3–1 | 6th | | |
| 1939 | Ohio State | 6–2 | 5–1 | 1st | | 15 |
| 1940 | Ohio State | 4–4 | 3–3 | T–4th | | |
| Ohio State: | | 39–16–1 | 30–9–1 | | | |
Idaho Vandals (Pacific Coast Conference) (1941–1942)
| 1941 | Idaho | 4–5 | 0–4 | 10th | | |
| 1942 | Idaho | 3–7 | 1–5 | 9th | | |
| Idaho: | | 7–12 | 1–9 | | | |
| Total: | | 157–58–11 | | | | |
National championship Conference title Conference division title or championship game berth
^{#}Rankings from final AP Poll.

=== Men's basketball ===
Record table
| Season | Team | Overall | Conference | Standing | Postseason |
|---|---|---|---|---|---|
Kendal Orange and Black/Tulsa Golden Hurricane () (1915–1917)
| 1915–16 | Kendall | 5–2 | | | |
| 1916–17 | Kendall | 5–3 | | | |
Kendal Orange and Black/Tulsa Golden Hurricane (Oklahoma Intercollegiate Conference) (1918–1922)
| 1918–19 | Kendall | 5–3 | | | |
| 1919–20 | Kendall | 16–3 | | | |
| 1920–21 | Kendall | 18–2 | | | National AAU tournament |
| 1921–22 | Tulsa | 14–4 | | | |
| Tulsa: | | 73–26 (.737) | | | |
Arkansas Razorbacks (Southwest Conference) (1923–1929)
| 1923–24 | Arkansas | 17–11 | 3–9 | 7th | |
| 1924–25 | Arkansas | 21–5 | 10–4 | 3rd | |
| 1925–26 | Arkansas | 23–2 | 11–1 | 1st | |
| 1926–27 | Arkansas | 14–2 | 8–2 | 1st | |
| 1927–28 | Arkansas | 19–1 | 12–0 | 1st | |
| 1928–29 | Arkansas | 19–1 | 11–1 | 1st | |
| Arkansas: | | 113–22 (.837) | 55–17 (.764) | | |
TCU Horned Frogs (Southwest Conference) (1929–1934)
| 1929–30 | TCU | 7–10 | 4–8 | 7th | |
| 1930–31 | TCU | 18–4 | 9–3 | 1st | |
| 1931–32 | TCU | 18–4 | 9–3 | 2nd | |
| 1932–33 | TCU | 16–4 | 9–3 | 2nd | |
| 1933–34 | TCU | 13–2 | 10–2 | 1st | |
| TCU: | | 72–24 (.750) | 41–19 (.683) | | |
| Total: | | 258–72 (.782) | | | |
National champion Postseason invitational champion Conference regular season champion Conference regular season and conference tournament champion Division regular season champion Division regular season and conference tournament champion Conference tournament champion

=== Baseball ===
Record table
| Season | Team | Overall | Conference | Standing | Postseason |
|---|---|---|---|---|---|
Arkansas Razorbacks (Southwest Conference) (1923–1929)
| 1923 | Arkansas | 5–11 | | | |
| 1924 | Arkansas | 3–11 | | | |
| 1925 | Arkansas | 5–11 | | | |
| 1926 | Arkansas | 4–13 | | | |
| 1927 | Arkansas | 8–5 | | | |
| 1928 | Arkansas | 7–6 | | | |
| 1929 | Arkansas | 6–7 | | | |
| Arkansas: | | 38–64 (.373) | | | |
| Total: | | 38–64 (.373) | | | |
National champion Postseason invitational champion Conference regular season champion Conference regular season and conference tournament champion Division regular season champion Division regular season and conference tournament champion Conference tournament champion
