= 1930 Pittsburgh Panthers football team =

American college football season

1930 Pittsburgh Panthers football
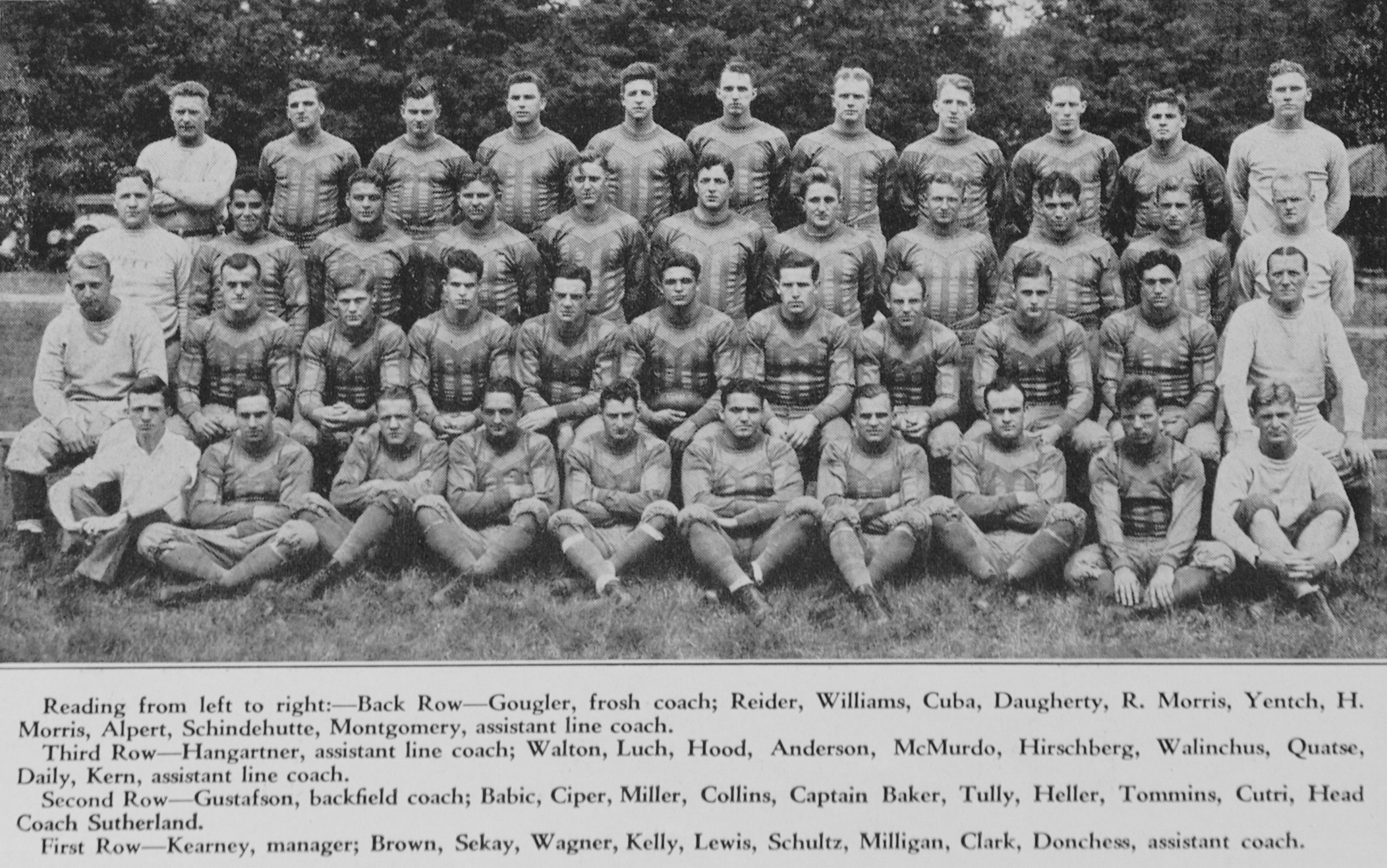
- Conference: Independent
- Record: 6–2–1
- Head coach: Jock Sutherland (7th season)
- Offensive scheme: Single-wing
- Captain: Edward Baker
- Home stadium: Pitt Stadium

1930 Eastern college football independents records
	Conf.			Overall
Team	W	L	T	W		L		T
Colgate		–		9	–	1	–	0
Fordham		–		8	–	1	–	0
No. 9 Army		–		9	–	1	–	1
No. 8 Dartmouth		–		7	–	1	–	1
St. John's		–		7	–	1	–	0
NYU		–		7	–	3	–	0
Cornell		–		6	–	2	–	0
Pittsburgh		–		6	–	2	–	1
Washington & Jefferson		–		6	–	2	–	1
Tufts		–		5	–	2	–	0
Temple		–		7	–	3	–	0
Bucknell		–		6	–	3	–	0
Carnegie Tech		–		6	–	3	–	0
Duquesne		–		6	–	3	–	0
Syracuse		–		5	–	2	–	2
Yale		–		5	–	2	–	2
CCNY		–		5	–	2	–	1
Brown		–		6	–	3	–	1
Drexel		–		6	–	3	–	1
Franklin & Marshall		–		5	–	3	–	1
Manhattan		–		4	–	3	–	1
Columbia		–		5	–	4	–	0
Penn		–		5	–	4	–	0
Boston College		–		5	–	5	–	0
Villanova		–		5	–	5	–	0
Penn State		–		3	–	4	–	2
Harvard		–		3	–	4	–	1
Providence		–		3	–	4	–	1
Princeton		–		1	–	5	–	1
Boston University		–		1	–	7	–	1
Vermont		–		1	–	7	–	1
Massachusetts		–		1	–	8	–	0
Rankings from Dickinson System

The 1930 Pittsburgh Panthers football team was an American football team that represented the University of Pittsburgh as an independent during the 1930 college football season. In its seventh season under head coach Jock Sutherland, the team compiled a 6–2–1 record, shut out five of its nine opponents, and outscored all opponents by a total of 186 to 69. The team played its home games at Pitt Stadium in Pittsburgh.

== Schedule ==
Date	Opponent	Site	Result	Attendance	Source
September 27	Waynesburg	Pitt Stadium; Pittsburgh, PA	W 52–0	18,000	
October 4	at West Virginia	Mountaineer Field; Morgantown, WV (rivalry)	W 16–0	22,000	
October 11	at Western Reserve	League Park; Cleveland, OH	W 52–0	12,000	
October 18	at Syracuse	Archbold Stadium; Syracuse, NY (rivalry)	W 14–0	15,000–20,000	
October 25	Notre Dame	Pitt Stadium; Pittsburgh, PA	L 19–35	74,233	
November 1	at Nebraska	Memorial Stadium; Lincoln, NE	T 0–0	30,000	
November 8	Carnegie Tech	Pitt Stadium; Pittsburgh, PA	W 7–6	52,000	
November 15	at Ohio State	Ohio Stadium; Columbus, OH	L 7–16	48,908	
November 27	Penn State	Pitt Stadium; Pittsburgh, PA (rivalry)	W 19–12	10,000	

== Preseason ==
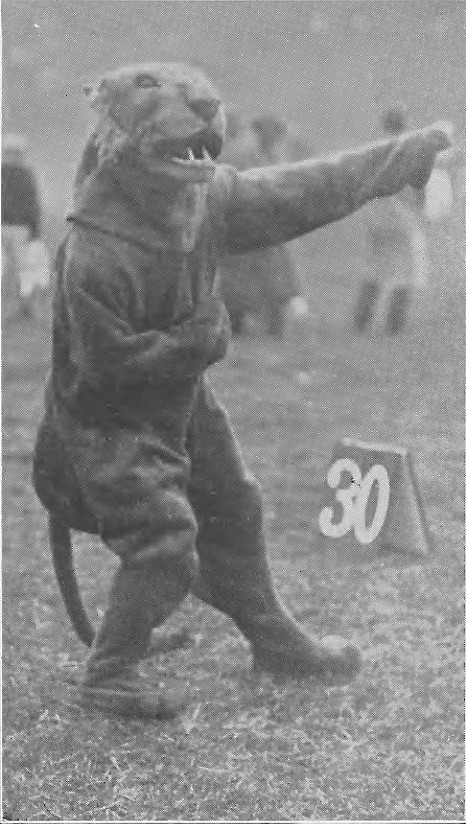
1930 Pitt Panther mascot

Coach Sutherland needed to replace eleven members of the 1929 squad. Five regulars, Albert DiMeolo, Ray Montgomery, Joe Donchess, Toby Uansa and Tom Parkinson, received All-America honors, while the six substitutes – Markley Barnes, James Rooney, Felix Wilps, Arthur Corson, William Loehr and Charles Edwards – all played substantial minutes during the season. At the annual banquet Sutherland "bemoaned the loss of so many of his 1929 stars, saying that a good team could be formed of the players who graduate next spring." He continued: "Our 1930 schedule is the hardest we have ever tackled. We play four times away from home, something a Pitt team has not done in years. We have six consecutive games with Class A opponents. My prediction is that we will win some games we may be expected to lose and lose some which look like sure victories." He named Edward Baker captain. Walter Kearney was later appointed student manager for the 1930 season.

Jock Sutherland's coaching staff had to be restocked for the 1930 season. Charles W. Bowser, assistant coach in charge of the backfield, became head coach at Bowdoin College. Alexander Stevenson, assistant Pitt coach and scout since 1909, contracted pneumonia upon his return from the Rose Bowl and died on February 5. Andy Gustafson, former Pitt fullback, succeeded Charles Bowser as head backfield coach. He had been the head coach at Virginia Tech from 1926 to 1929. 1929 All-Americans Joe Donchess and Ray Montgomery were both hired by the athletic council to assist coach Sutherland for the 1930 season. Montgomery coached the varsity linemen and taught in the physical education department. Donchess was still in medical school and assisted team physician Dr. Shanor with physical conditioning of the players. He also helped coach the ends. Bill Kern, former All-American Pitt tackle, was added to the staff during spring practice. He coached the linemen. The appointment of Ulhardt Hangartner, former Panther guard, completed the coaching staff. He was hired to assist the linemen and be in charge of scouting.

On March 15 coach Sutherland welcomed a record turnout for the start of spring practice. He was anxious to get a glimpse of the new material from last year's freshmen team. The spring session consisted of an hour and a half of basic football drills every afternoon for five or six weeks. Daily scrimmages helped to weed out the players with little or no varsity promise. The spring session determined who got invited to Camp Hamilton for the preseason conditioning.

The 1930 spring session came to a somber conclusion, as veteran running back Leo Murphy sustained a broken neck while blocking during a scrimmage on April 23. He died 6 days later.

Thirty-seven varsity hopefuls were invited to Camp Hamilton on September 1 for the annual preseason conditioning program. Coach Sutherland sent out the invitations with a copy of the rule book and a pair of cleats. His message: "Get the shoes well broken in before you report to camp. Familiarize yourself with the new changes in regards to the rules and study the book so that you are in perfect familiarity with the laws of the game." James Hagan, assistant athletic director, was in charge of the camp. He was ably assisted by student manager Walter Kearney. Trainer Bud Moore, physician Dr. H. A. R. Shanor and equipment manager Percy Brown were all in attendance. After three weeks of training, the team returned to Pittsburgh and practiced on the hill above the stadium in preparation for the home opener against Waynesburg College. Coach Sutherland summarized training camp: "The squad finished at camp in good physical shape but we're a few days late in our schedule as a result of a keen fight for positions, and I will be unable to name a starting lineup for the Waynesburg game for a few days yet."

== Coaching staff ==
1930 Pittsburgh Panthers football staff
Coaching staff: John B. "Jock" Sutherland – Head coach; Andy Gustafson – assistant backfield coach; Joe Donchess – assistant line coach; Ray Montgomery – assistant line coach; Bill Kern – assistant line coach; Ulhardt Hangartner – Assistant coach - scout; Roscoe "Skip" Gougler – Freshman coach	Support staff: Walter Kearney– student football manager; Dr. H. A. R. Shanor – team physician; George Moore – team trainer; Percy S. Browne – custodian of equipment; W. D. Harrison - director of athletics; James Hagan – assistant director of athletics

== Roster ==
1930 Pittsburgh Panthers football roster
Player	Position	Games	Height	Weight	Class	Prep School	Hometown
Edward Baker*	quarterback	9	6' 1"	166	1931	Nanticoke H. S.	Nanticoke, PA
Harold "Josh" Williams*	halfback	7	5' 10"	166	1931	Mars H. S.	Mars, PA
Charles Tully*	tackle	9	6' 1"	181	1931	Warwood H. S.	Wheeling, WV
Franklin Hood*	halfback	8	6'	195	1931	Bellefonte Academy	Monaca, Pa.
William Walinchus*	halfback	8	5' 11"	169	1931	Mahanoy City H. S.	Mahanoy City, PA
Ernest Lewis*	guard	9	5' 9"	184	1931	Steelton H. S.	Steelton, PA
Harry Wagner*	quarterback	5	5' 10"	158	1931	Schenley H. S.	Pittsburgh, PA
Edward Schultz*	halfback	4	5' 9"	160	1931	St. Thomas Prep.	West Pittston, PA
Al Ciper*	tackle	2	6'	180	1931	Glenwillard H. S.	Glenwillard, PA
Ralph Daugherty*	center	8	5' 11"	174	1932	Kiski School	Freeport, PA
James MacMurdo	tackle	6	6' 2"	189	1932	Ellwood City H. S.	Ellwood City, PA
Paul Collins	end	7	6'	178	1932	Central H. S.	Sioux City, IA
Jesse Quatse*	tackle	9	5' 10"	195	1933	Greensburg H. S.	Rillton, PA
Hart Morris*	guard	6	5' 10"	175	1932	Bellaire H. S.	Bellaire, OH
Edward Hirshberg*	end	8	5' 11"	173	1932	McKeesport H. S.	East McKeesport, PA
James Clark*	fullback	6	5' 9"	162	1932	Greensburg H.S.	Greensburg, PA
Vladimar Babic	tackle	4	6'	177	1932	Duquesne H. S.	Duquesne, PA
Robert Morris	center	2	6'	179	1932	Bellaire H. S.	Bellaire, OH
Walter Milligan*	guard	8	5' 10"	168	1933	Kiski School	McKees Rocks, PA
Herman Yentch	guard	2	5' 11"	175	1932	Perkiomen Prep	Harrisburg, PA
Jack Kelly*	halfback	2	5' 9"	153	1932	Latrobe H. S.	Latrobe, PA
Joe Tommins	end	1	5' 10"	169	1932	Farrell H. S.	Farrell, PA
Theodore Dailey*	end	9	5' 10"	155	1933	Phillipsburg H. S.	Phillipsburg, NJ
Frank Walton	tackle	3	5' 10"	200	1933	Beaver Falls H. S.	Beaver Falls, PA
Paul Cuba	guard	3	5' 11"	180	1933	New Castle H. S.	New Castle, PA
Joseph Tormey*	center	7	5' 11"	180	1933	Erie Academy	Erie, PA
Francis Seigel	guard	4	5' 10"	173	1933	Central H. S.	Sioux City, IA
Charles Miller	tackle	2	6'	177	1933	McKinley H. S.	Louisville, OH
Rocco Cutri	quarterback	3	6'	170	1933	Erie Academy	Erie, PA
Paul Reider*	halfback	8	5' 9"	150	1933	Bellefonte Academy	New Castle. PA
Warren Heller*	halfback	9	5' 10"	155	1933	Steelton H. S.	Steelton, PA
John Luch	fullback	3	5' 10"	190	1933	Warwood H. S.	Wheeling, WV
Melvin Brown	halfback	6	5' 9"	160	1933	Central H. S.	Pittsburgh, PA
Zola Alpert	quarterback	2	5' 10"	155	1933	Culver Military Academy	Pittsburgh, PA
Ray Anderson	tackle	2	6' 1'	180	1933	Coraopolis H. S.	Coraopolis, PA
Isadore Cohen	end	0	5' 11"	165	1933	Central H. S.	Philadelphia, PA
George Schindehutte	guard	1	5' 9"	170	1933	McKees Rocks H. S.	McKees Rocks, PA
Arthur Sekay	halfback	2	5' 9"	155	1933	Schenley H. S.	Pittsburgh, PA
Walter A. Kearney*	student manager				1931	Altoona H. S.	Altoona, PA
* Letterman

== Game summaries ==
=== Waynesburg ===
Week 1: Waynesburg at Pitt

Team	1	2	3	4	Total
Waynesburg	0	0	0	0	0
• Pitt	6	13	7	26	52

- Date: September 27, 1930
- Location: Pitt Stadium,
  Pittsburgh, PA
- Game start: 2:00 p.m.
- Game attendance: 18,000
- Game weather: sunny
- Referee: W. H. Friesell (Princeton)

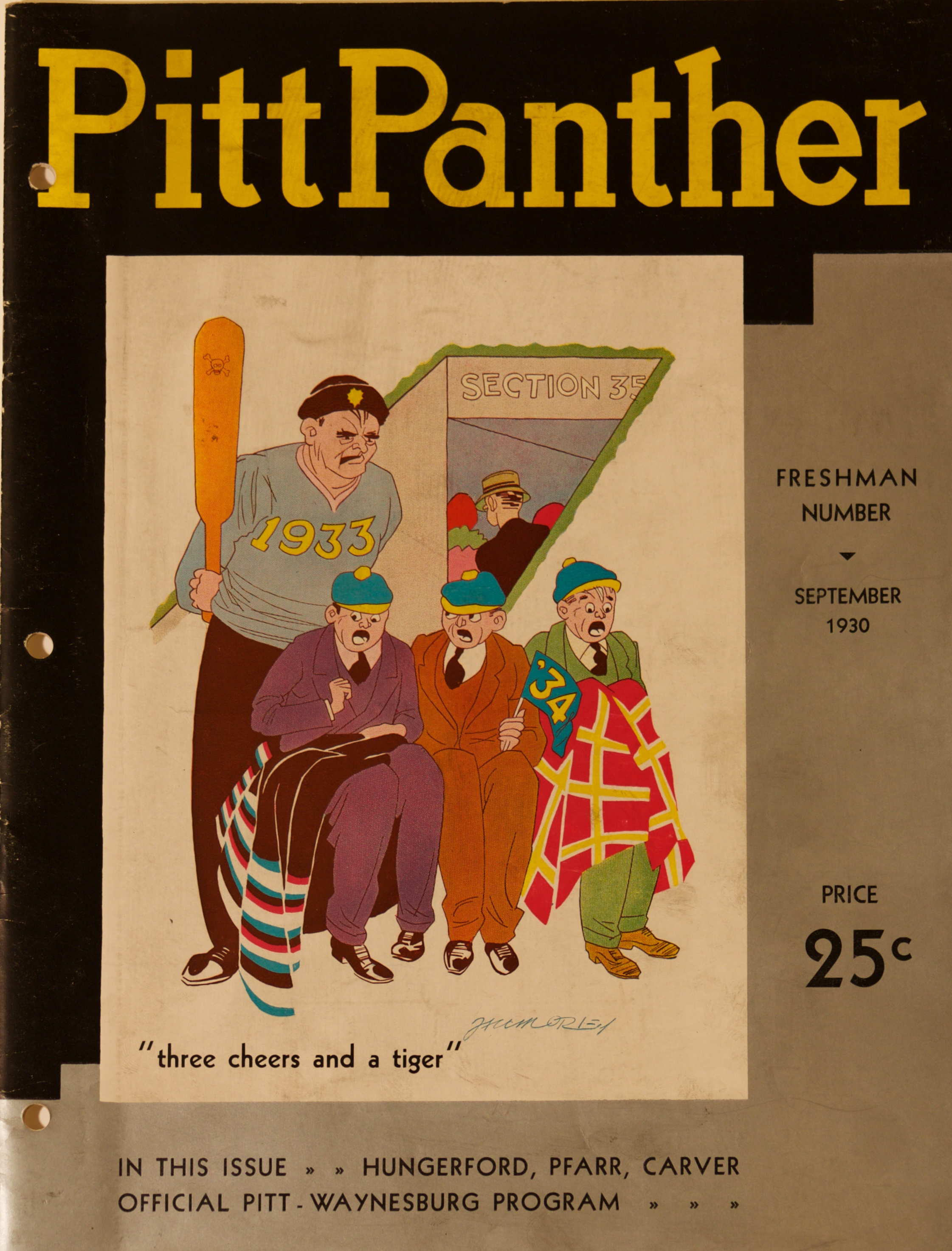
Program for September 27, 1930 Pitt vs. Waynesburg game

After losing to Pitt 53–0 in 1929, Frank N. Wolf and his Waynesburg Yellow Jackets returned to be Pitt's opening game opponent. The Jackets were upset in their opening game by Slippery Rock (6–0). Havey Boyle of the Post-Gazette summarized the absurdity of the matchup: "Sending Waynesburg against Pitt, which operation will occur at the stadium tomorrow, is different from sending a Christian into an arena containing lions as the dinner bell is tapping, but only because the Pitt players do not eat their prey. But Waynesburg has about the same chance as the brave martyrs of old....Waynesburg will gain something besides bruised bodies from the encounter. It tends to harden them and gives them a better outlook when they come across a team in their own class. Pitt, of course, gets the advantage of scrimmage practice without running the usual risks of hurting their own players."

The Panthers won the game 52 to 0, with every man on the active roster participating. The Panther offense earned 24 first downs and scored 8 touchdowns. The Pitt defense held Waynesburg to one first down. A brisk wind played havoc with the extra points, as Pitt was able to only convert 4 of 8. Waynesburg finished the season with a 2-7 record.

The University of Pittsburgh student magazine The Pitt Panther doubled as the game day program.

The Pitt starting lineup for the Waynesburg game was James MacMurdo (left end), Jesse Quatse (left tackle), Hart Morris (left guard), Ralph Daugherty (center), Ernest Lewis (right guard), Charles Tully (right tackle), Edward Hirshberg (right end), Edward Baker (quarterback), Josh Williams (left halfback), Warren Heller (right halfback), and Frank Hood (fullback). Substitutes appearing in the game for Pitt were Melvin Brown, Art Sekay, Bucky Wagner, Jack Kelly, Ed Schultz, Francis Seigel, Mike Milligan, Walter Babic, Al Ciper, Charles Miller, Paul Collins, Joe Tommins, Rocco Cutri, John Luch, Frank Walton, Joe Tormey, Ray Anderson, Bill Walinchus, Ted Dailey, Paul Reider, Paul Cuba, Bob Morris, Herman Yentch, Zola Alpert and George Shindehutte.

Scoring summary

Quarter	Time	Drive			Team	Scoring information	Score	
Quarter	Time	Plays	Yards	TOP	Team	Scoring information	Waynesburg	Pittsburgh
1		12	66		Pittsburgh	Franklin Hood 1-yard touchdown run, Edward Baker kick no good	0	6
2		9	67		Pittsburgh	Warren Heller 10-yard touchdown run, Baker kick no good	0	12
2		9	50		Pittsburgh	Baker 11-yard touchdown run, Baker kick good	0	19
3		10	63		Pittsburgh	Bucky Wagner 2-yard touchdown run, Baker kick good	0	26
4		19	60		Pittsburgh	Bill Walinchus 1-yard touchdown run, Baker kick good	0	33
4		1	28		Pittsburgh	Walinchus 28-yard touchdown run, Heller kick good	0	40
4		1	66		Pittsburgh	Melvin Brown 66-yard touchdown run, Brown kick no good	0	46
4		1	45		Pittsburgh	Punt returned 45 yards for touchdown by Zola Alpert, Brown kick no good	0	52
"TOP" = time of possession. For other American football terms, see Glossary of American football.							0	52

=== At West Virginia ===
Week 2: Pitt at West Virginia

Team	1	2	3	4	Total
• Pitt	7	0	9	0	16
West Virginia	0	0	0	0	0

- Date: October 4, 1930
- Location: Mountaineer Field,
  Morgantown, WV
- Game start: 2:00 p.m.
- Game attendance: 22,000
- Game weather: warm
- Referee: Dex Very (Penn State)

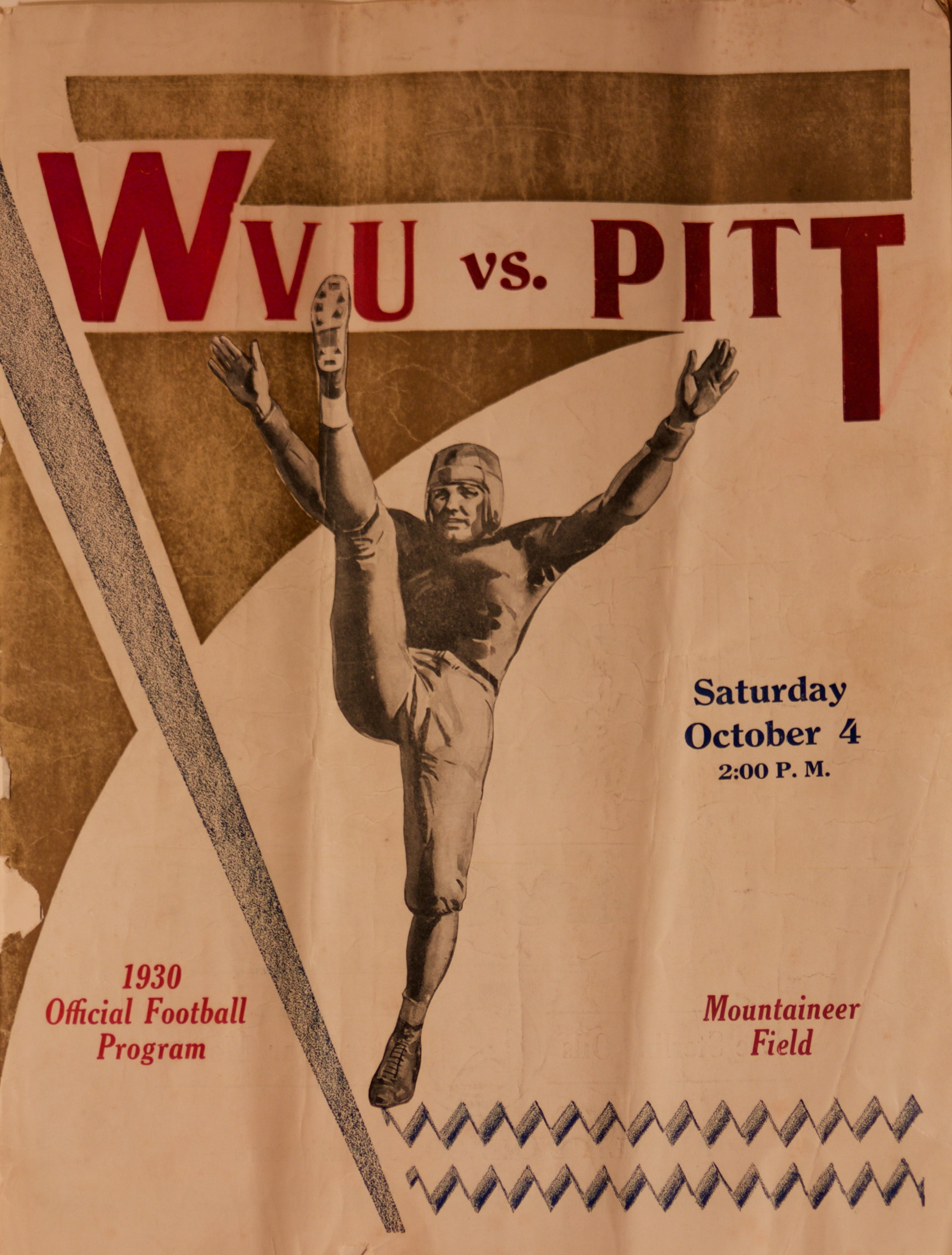
Program for October 4, 1930 Pitt vs. West Virginia game

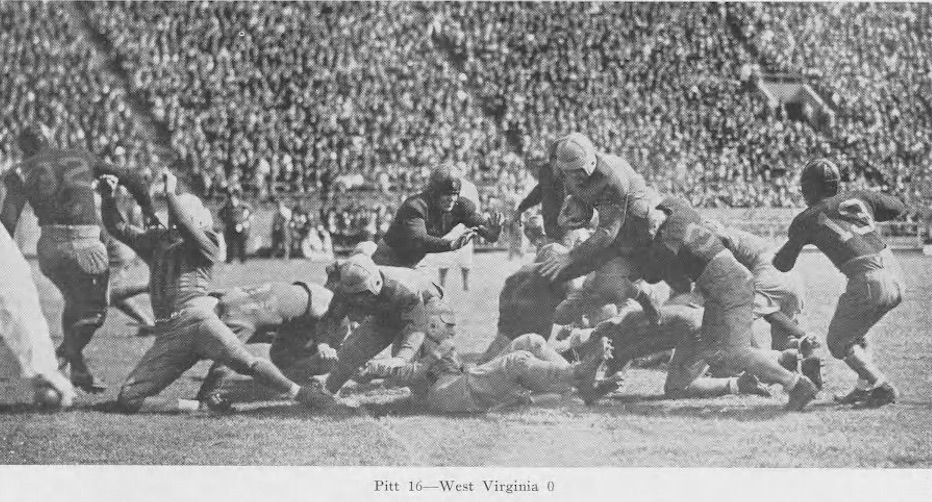
Game action in Oct. 4, 1930 Pitt vs. West Virginia game

The Panther squad's first road trip of the season was to Morgantown, WV for the 26th gridiron meeting with the Mountaineers. West Virginia was led by sixth-year coach Ira Rodgers. The Panthers had not been to Morgantown since the 1917 season when Coach Sutherland played for Pitt and Coach Rogers played for West Virginia. The Mountaineers were 2–0 on the season after beating Duquesne (7–0) and West Virginia Wesleyan (26–0). Pitt led the series 16-8-1.

Future Hall-of-Fame coach Ben Schwartzwalder started at center for the Mountaineers.

By 1930 the travel options to Morgantown were numerous. The Panther squad rode the train; the 100 piece student band, cheerleaders and mascot rode in buses; and students and fans had the choice of train, bus or car.

In front of the largest crowd to ever watch a game on Mountaineer Field (22,000), the Pitt Panthers beat the West Virginia Mountaineers 16 to 0. The Pitt offense turned two long drives into scores. The Panthers marched 85 yards in the first quarter, and 59 yards in the third quarter. Fullback Franklin Hood scored both touchdowns, and Edward Baker added the placements. The Panthers earned a safety when Mountaineer quarterback Jake Sebulsky was tackled in the end zone, after he fumbled James MacMurdo's kickoff into the end zone. The Pitt defense held the Mounties scoreless. West Virginia's offense earned seven first downs, and only entered Pitt territory in the fourth quarter. The Mountaineers earned a first down on the Pitt 24-yard line, but an attempted pass was fumbled and Pitt recovered to stop the drive. The Mountaineers finished the season with a 5–5 record.

The Pitt starting lineup for the game against West Virginia was James MacMurdo (left end), Jesse Quatse (left tackle), Hart Morris (left guard), Ralph Daugherty (center), Ernest Lewis (right guard), Charles Tully (right tackle), Edward Hirshberg (right end), Edward Baker (quarterback), Warren Heller (left halfback), William Walinchus (right halfback) and Franklin Hood (fullback). Substitutes appearing in the game for Pitt were Francis Seigel, Joseph Tormey, Walter Milligan, Frank Walton, Paul Collins, Bucky Wagner, Melvin Brown, Theodore Dailey, Ray Anderson, Walter Babic, Edward Schultz, Rocco Cutri, Jack Kelly, John Loch, Zola Alpert and Paul Cuba. Pitt tackle Frank Walton broke his shoulder and was expected to be sidelined the remainder of the season.

Scoring summary

Quarter	Time	Drive			Team	Scoring information	Score	
Quarter	Time	Plays	Yards	TOP	Team	Scoring information	Pittsburgh	West Virginia
1		16	85		Pittsburgh	Franklin Hood 4-yard touchdown run, Edward Baker kick good	7	0
3		14	59		Pittsburgh	Hood 5-yard touchdown run, Baker kick good	14	0
3					Pittsburgh	Jake Sebulsky tackled in end zone for a safety by two linemen	16	0
"TOP" = time of possession. For other American football terms, see Glossary of American football.							16	0

=== At Western Reserve ===
Week 3: Pitt at Western Reserve

Team	1	2	3	4	Total
• Pitt	13	20	12	7	52
Western Reserve	0	0	0	0	0

- Date: October 11, 1930
- Location: League Park,
  Cleveland, OH
- Game start: 2:00 p.m.
- Game attendance: 12,000
- Referee: R. W. Bechtel (Wittenberg)

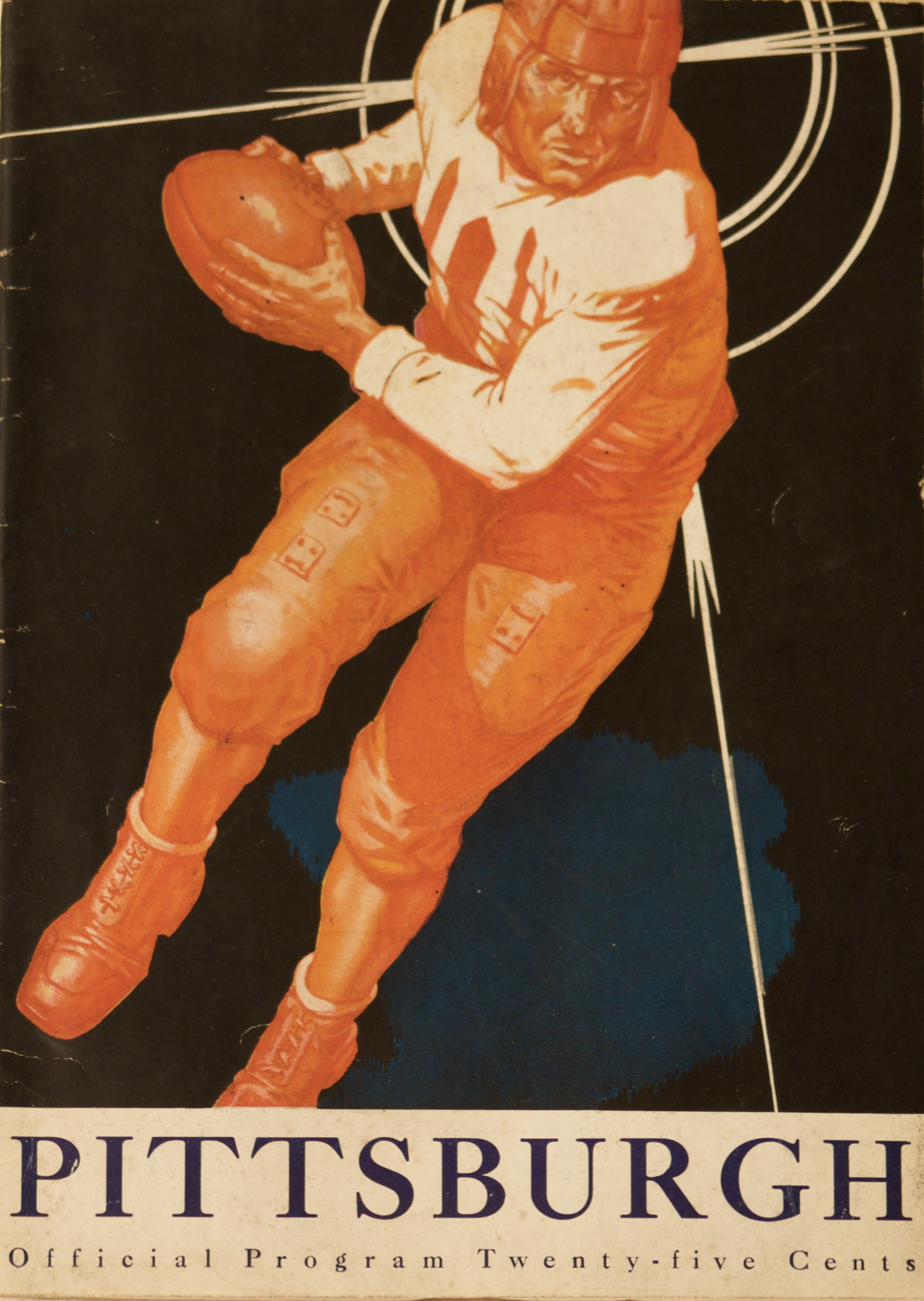
Program for October 11, 1930 Pitt vs. Western Reserve game

On October 11, the Panther football team traveled to Cleveland to meet the Red Cats of Western Reserve. This was the first meeting on the gridiron between these two schools. The game was scheduled through the effort of Karl Davis, former Pitt graduate manager of athletics, who now occupied the same position at Western Reserve. The Western Reserve football team was led by fifth-year coach Gordon Locke.

The Pitt Panthers won their third straight by running roughshod over the Western Reserve eleven on League Field 52 to 0 in front of 12,000 fans. The Panther offense matched their Waynesburg output with eight touchdowns and four extra points. Pitt quarterback Edward Baker ran the opening kickoff back 97 yards for his first of three touchdowns on the day. Josh Williams contributed two touchdowns, while Paul Reider, Frank Hood and Melvin Brown each tallied one. Baker converted two placements, while Rocco Curti and Melvin Brown converted one each. The Red Cat defense had no answer as the Panthers gained 426 total yards and accumulated 19 first downs. The Western offense managed to gain 98 total yards and earn 3 first downs. The Red Cats finished the season with a 1–7 record. Their lone victory came against their Cleveland neighbor and future partner, the Case School of Applied Science (13–6).

Both Edward Hirschberg and James MacMurdo injured their knee in the Mountaineer game and did not play. Coach Sutherland revamped the starting lineup and was able to use all his substitutes for the third straight game. The Pitt starting lineup for the game against Western Reserve was Theodore Dailey (left end), Jesse Quatse (left tackle), Hart Morris (left guard), Joseph Tormey (center), Ernest Lewis (right guard), Charles Tully (right tackle), Paul Collins (right end), Edward Baker (quarterback), Warren Heller (left halfback), William Walinchus (right halfback) and Frank Hood (fullback). Substitutes appearing in the game for Pitt were Josh Williams, Francis Seigel, Rocco Curti, Bucky Wagner, Walter Milligan, Paul Reider, Paul Cuba, Al Ciper, Edward Schultz, Herman Yentch, Melvin Brown, Zola Alpert, John Luch, Walter Babic, Jack Kelly, Robert Morris, Arthur Sekay, Charles Miller and Ray Anderson.

Scoring summary

Quarter	Time	Drive			Team	Scoring information	Score	
Quarter	Time	Plays	Yards	TOP	Team	Scoring information	Pittsburgh	Western Reserve
1		1	97		Pittsburgh	Kickoff returned 97 yards for touchdown by Edward Baker, Edward Baker kick no good	6	0
1					Pittsburgh	Baker 12-yard touchdown reception from Warren Heller, Baker kick good	13	0
2		4	41		Pittsburgh	Baker 15-yard touchdown reception from Heller, Baker kick good	20	0
2		3	33		Pittsburgh	Josh Williams 10-yard touchdown run, Rocco Cutri kick good	27	0
2		3	50		Pittsburgh	Paul Reider 15-yard touchdown run, Cutri kick no good	33	0
3					Pittsburgh	Frank Hood 4-yard touchdown run, Zola Alpert kick no good	39	0
3		5	57		Pittsburgh	Williams 9-yard touchdown run, Alpert kick no good	45	0
4		1	48		Pittsburgh	Melvin Brown 48-yard touchdown run, Brown kick good	52	0
"TOP" = time of possession. For other American football terms, see Glossary of American football.							52	0

=== At Syracuse ===
Week 4: Pitt at Syracuse

Team	1	2	3	4	Total
• Pitt	0	7	0	7	14
Syracuse	0	0	0	0	0

- Date: October 18, 1930
- Location: Archbold Stadium
  Syracuse, NY
- Game start: 2:30 p.m.
- Game attendance: 15,000–20,000
- Game weather: cold and windy
- Referee: Ed Thorpe (De LaSalle)

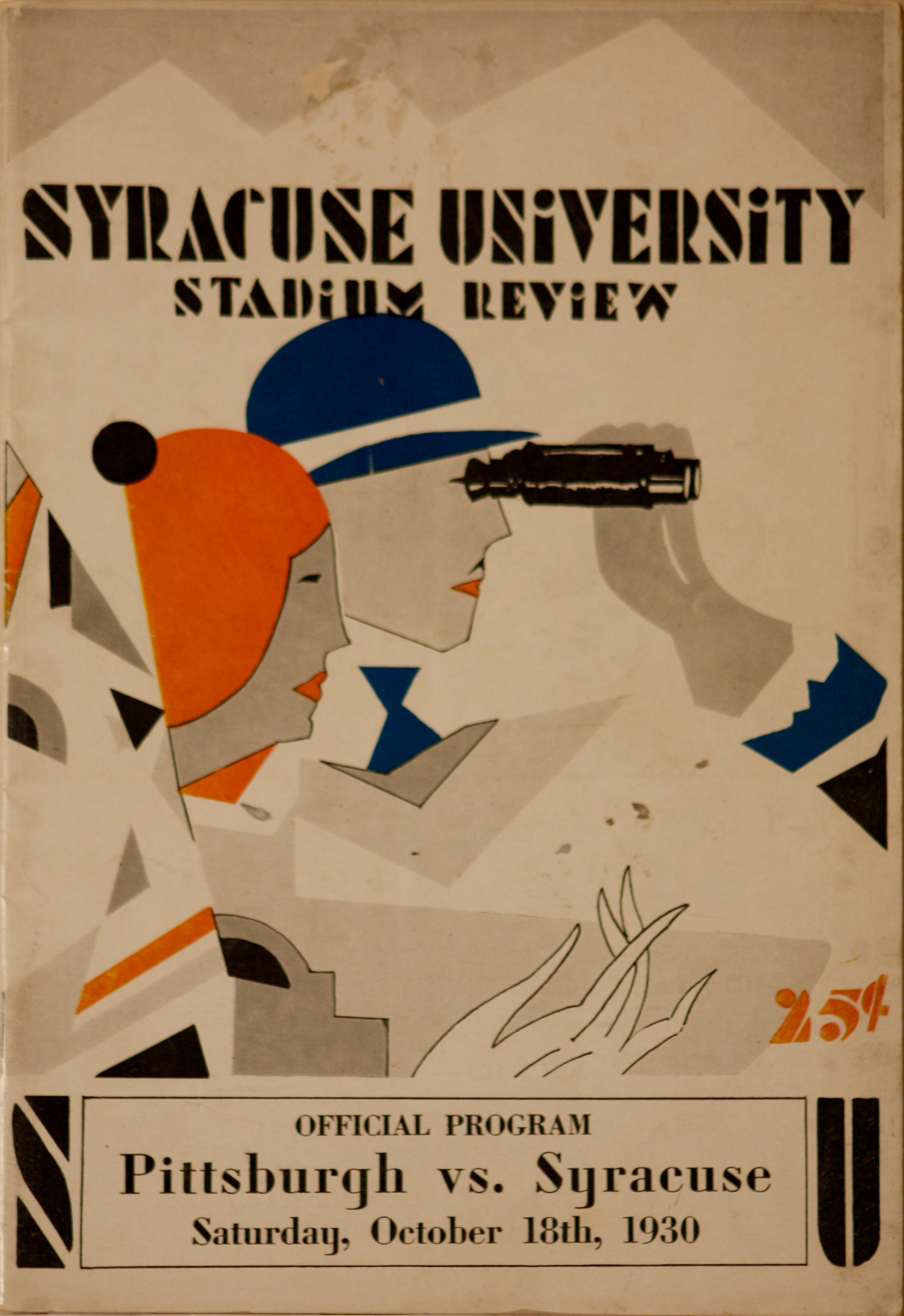
Program for October 18, 1930 Pitt vs. Syracuse game

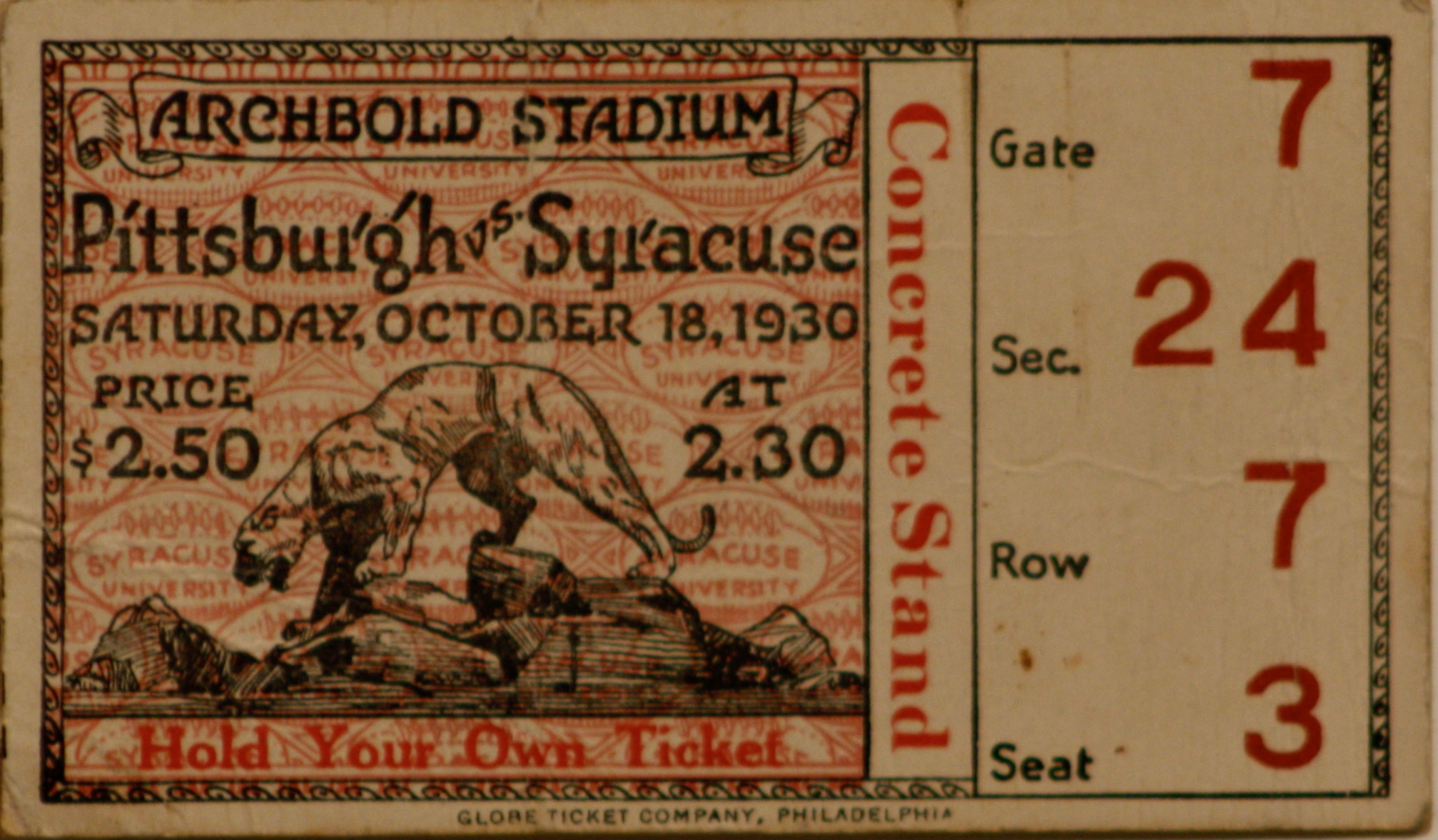
Ticket stub for October 18, 1930 Pitt vs. Syracuse game

Archbold Stadium in Syracuse, NY was the third of the Panthers' five scheduled road games. First year coach Vic Hanson's Syracuse Orangemen were undefeated (3–0) and had out scored their opposition 131 to 0. Syracuse end George A. Ellert received third-team All-American mention from both the International News Service and the Central Press Association. The Panthers led the all-time series 5–2–2, but their record for games played at Syracuse was 2–2–2.

The Panthers arrived in Cazenovia, NY on Friday, and had their final workout at the Shore Acres Country Club. Three starters were nursing injuries. Ends Edward Hirschberg and James MacMurdo, plus guard Hart Morris were replaced by Paul Collins, Theodore Daily and Walter Milligan in the starting lineup.

On October 18, 1930, the Pitt Panthers disappointed the Syracuse University Homecoming crowd by defeating the Orange, 14–0. The game was a defensive battle with lots of punting to gain field position. The first period ended scoreless. Fullback Frank Hood scored both touchdowns for the Panthers. His first score came in the second quarter. After Syracuse halfback Warren Stevens fumbled an Edward Baker punt, Pitt recovered on the Orange 13-yard line. Four plays later Hood plunged into the end zone from the 1-yard line. Baker added the point after, and Pitt led at halftime, 7 to 0. The third stanza was also scoreless. In the middle of the final period, the Panthers gained possession on the Syracuse 24-yard line. On fourth down Baker completed a 19 yard pass play to Paul Reider for a first down on the 1-yard line. On third down Hood scored. Baker's placement kick was perfect. Pitt remained undefeated and unscored upon – Pitt 14 to Syracuse 0. The Orange finished the season with a 5–2–2 record. The schools would not meet again on the gridiron until the 1955 season.

The Pitt starting lineup for the game against Syracuse was Theodore Dailey (left end), Jesse Quatse (left tackle), Walter Milligan (left guard), Ralph Daugherty (center), Ernest Lewis (right guard), Charles Tully (right tackle), Paul Collins (right end), Edward Baker (quarterback), Warren Heller (left halfback), Josh Williams (right halfback) and Frank Hood (fullback). Substitutes appearing in the game for Pitt were James Clark, Paul Reider, Edward Hirshberg, Joeseph Tormey, William Walinchus, Bucky Wagner, John Luch and Paul Cuba.

Scoring summary

Quarter	Time	Drive			Team	Scoring information	Score	
Quarter	Time	Plays	Yards	TOP	Team	Scoring information	Pittsburgh	Syracuse
2		4	13		Pittsburgh	Frank Hood 1-yard touchdown run, Edward Baker kick good	7	0
4		7	24		Pittsburgh	Hood 1-yard touchdown run, Baker kick good	14	0
"TOP" = time of possession. For other American football terms, see Glossary of American football.							14	0

=== Notre Dame ===
Week 5: Notre Dame at Pitt

Team	1	2	3	4	Total
• Notre Dame	14	21	0	0	35
Pitt	0	0	0	19	19

- Date: October 25, 1930
- Location: Pitt Stadium
  Pittsburgh, PA
- Game start: 2:00 p.m.
- Game attendance: 74,233
- Game weather: fair and cold
- Referee: J. P. Egan (Duquesne)

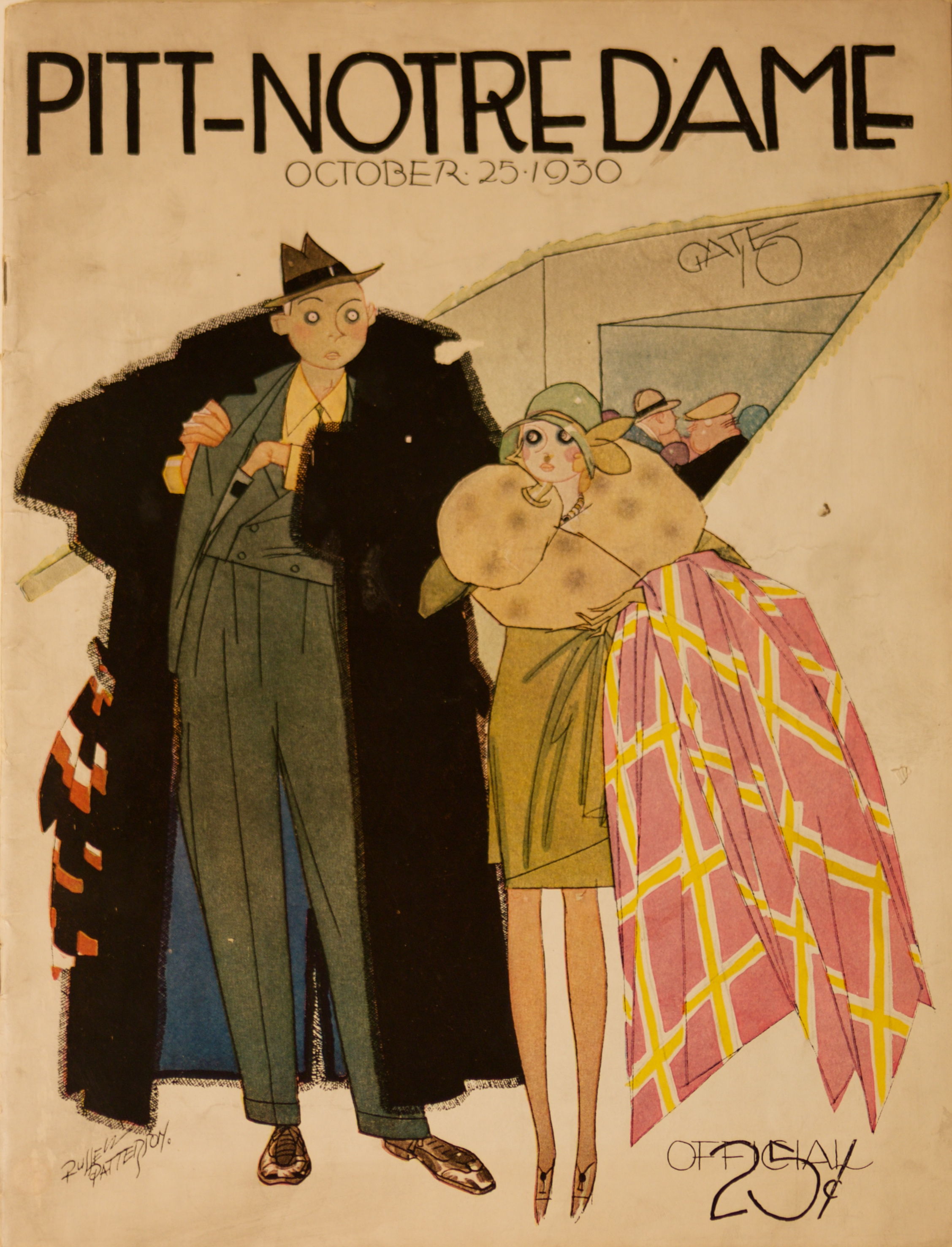
Program for October 25, 1930 Pitt vs. Notre Dame game

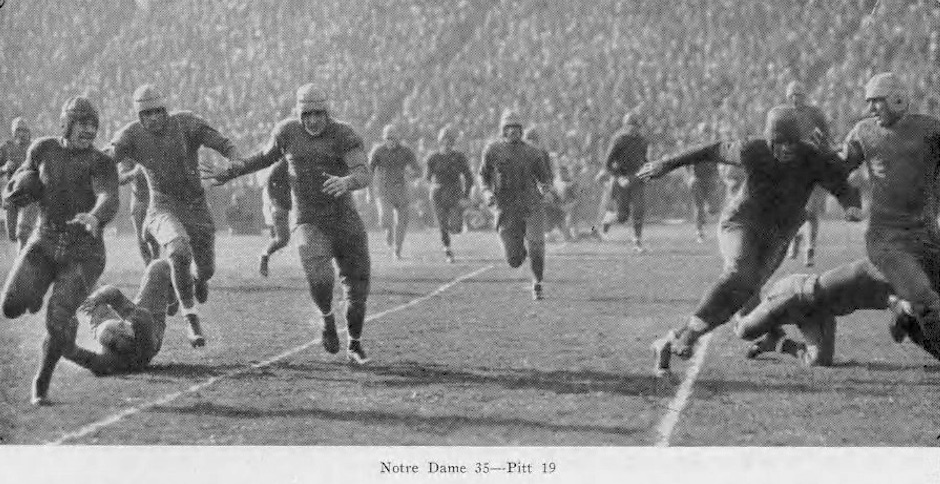
Action in October 25, 1930 Pitt vs. Notre Dame game

On October 25, the undefeated Notre Dame Fighting Irish came to Pitt Stadium to take on the undefeated Pitt Panthers. Knute Rockne's Irish were on a twelve game win streak. Rockne brought 38 of his 79 squad members east for the game. Twenty-one of the remaining players went to Madison, WI to play the Wisconsin "B" team. Twenty went to Evanston, IL to play the Northwestern "B" team.

Notre Dame led the all-time series 2–0–1, but the teams had not met since the 1912 season. Coach Rockne was an end on the 1912 Irish team that beat the Panthers 3 to 0.

The 1930 Irish roster boasted 7 All-Americans – quarterback Frank Carideo and halfback Marchy Schwartz were consensus picks; guard Bertram Metzger was named first team by both the Associated Press (AP) and United Press (UP); end Tim Conley was named second team by the AP, UP and the Newspaper Editors Association (NEA); tackle Al Culver was named second team by the UP; fullback Joe Savoldi was named second team by the AP; and halfback Marty Brill was named first team by the All-America Board and third team by the UP and NEA.

The South Bend Tribune reported: The Irish were: "in 'tip-top' shape... Meanwhile Pitt goes through her final preparations up on the hilltop back of the stadium in a disconsolate, gloomy, but withall [sic] decidedly grim frame of mind. Dr. John Bain (Jock) Sutherland has publicly prophesied that the Panthers are in for a licking, and the series of injuries that struck the Gold and Blue last week-end at Syracuse only added to the depression."

The Pitt Athletic Department added 12,000 seats to the stadium and sold 75,000 tickets. 74,233 fans attended the game. "This was by many thousand the biggest throng that ever witnessed an athletic event in Western Pennsylvania." Pittsburgh scalpers printed and sold approximately 25,000 counterfeit pasteboards which caused confusion, chaos and numerous arrests prior to kick-off.

Coach Sutherland's prophecy came to fruition as Rockne's Irish trampled the Panthers 35–19. The Irish did all their scoring in the first half - five touchdowns and five extra points. Pitt was unable to get on the scoreboard until six minutes into the fourth quarter, when the Notre Dame second and third stringers were in the lineup. Notre Dame finished the season with a 10–0 record and National Championship recognition. This was the only time Jock Sutherland and Knute Rockne went head-to-head on the gridiron.

Harry G. Scott noted in his Jock Sutherland biography: "Jock Sutherland's regret at this loss was offset in large measure by the perseverance and fight that his boys showed that day...After the game he said, 'The boys stuck it out. They fought hard and gave everything they had. They wouldn't give up, and I'm proud of them.' "

The Pitt starting lineup was James MacMurdo (left end), Jesse Quatse (left tackle), Walter Milligan (left guard), Ralph Daugherty (center), Ernest Lewis (right guard), Charles Tully (right tackle), Paul Collins (right end), Edward Baker (quarterback), Warren Heller (left halfback), Josh Williams (right halfback) and Frank Hood (fullback). Substitutes appearing in the game for Pitt were James Clark, Paul Reider, Edward Hirshberg, Joseph Tormey, Theodore Dailey, William Walinchus and Walter Babic.

Scoring summary

Quarter	Time	Drive			Team	Scoring information	Score	
Quarter	Time	Plays	Yards	TOP	Team	Scoring information	Notre Dame	Pittsburgh
1		1	59		Notre Dame	Marchy Schwartz 59-yard touchdown run, Frank Carideo kick good	7	0
1		8	69		Notre Dame	Larry Mullins 1-yard touchdown run, Carideo kick good	14	0
2		7	33		Notre Dame	Joe Savoldi 1-yard touchdown run, Carideo kick good	21	0
2		1	34		Notre Dame	Interception returned 34 yards for touchdown by Savoldi, Carideo kick good	28	0
2		8	81		Notre Dame	Mike Koken 5-yard touchdown run, Charles Jaskwhich kick good	35	0
4		11	54		Pittsburgh	James Clark 1-yard touchdown run, Edward Baker kick no good	35	6
4		2	3		Pittsburgh	Paul Reider 1-yard touchdown run, Baker kick good	35	13
4		9	46		Pittsburgh	Clark 1-yard touchdown run, Baker kick no good	35	19
"TOP" = time of possession. For other American football terms, see Glossary of American football.							35	19

=== At Nebraska ===
Week 6: Pitt at Nebraska

Team	1	2	3	4	Total
Pitt	0	0	0	0	0
Nebraska	0	0	0	0	0

- Date: November 1, 1930
- Location: Memorial Stadium
  Lincoln, NE
- Game start: 2:00 p.m.
- Game attendance: 30,000
- Game weather: ideal
- Referee: E. C. Quigley (St. Mary's)

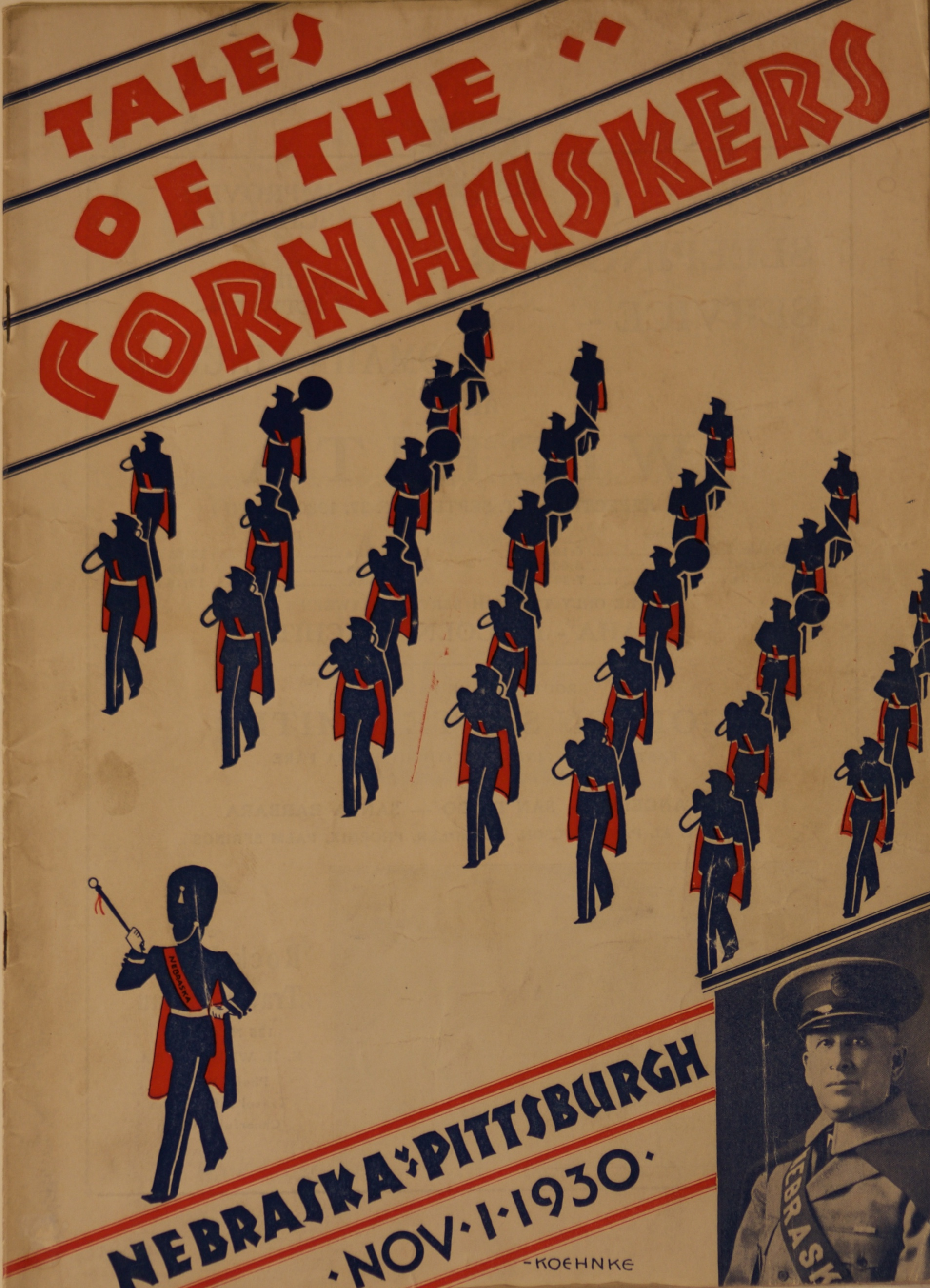
Program for November 1, 1930 Pitt vs. Nebraska game

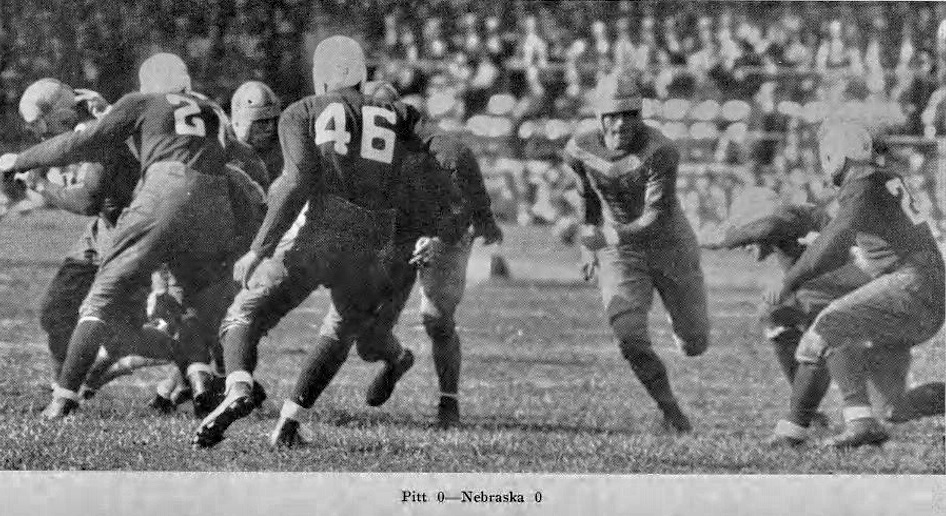
Photo from November 1, 1930 Pitt vs. Nebraska game

On November 1, the Pitt Panthers played their fourth road game of the season against the Nebraska Cornhuskers. Coach Dana Bible's Huskers were 3–1 on the season. The Nebraska line was anchored by 1st team Collier's All-America tackle Hugh Rhea. Fullback Robert Young and end Steve Hokuf joined Rhea on the AP first team All-Big Six Conference Team. Guard Elmer Greenberg and center Lawrence Ely were tabbed second team All-Big Six.

The Panthers followed their usual travel itinerary to Lincoln. Their train departed Pittsburgh Wednesday evening, and arrived in Chicago early Thursday. The squad worked out on Stagg Field at the University of Chicago. They reboarded the train in the evening, and arrived in Omaha on Friday morning. The team practiced on the Fort Omaha, U. S. Government military post. Coach Sutherland made one change in the starting lineup - James Clark replaced Frank Hood at fullback. The team spent the night at the Hotel Fontenelle in downtown Omaha. Saturday morning the entourage boarded the train for the 55 mile ride to Lincoln.

The intersectional battle between Pitt and Nebraska ended in a 0 to 0 tie. Gregg McBride of The Lincoln Star summarized: "Emblazoned above the varsity dressing room door at Nebraska's Memorial Stadium are these words, 'They Shall Not Score.' Saturday...a fighting band of Cornhusker linemen breathed the breath of life into Nebraska tradition by twice turning back at the goal line a band of determined Panthers....The thrills of an entire football game were crowded into those last 10 minutes of play....The spectacular performance of the Nebraska team which twice held the Panthers for downs within the 4-yard line will be vivid in the memories of the upwards to 30,000 spectators long after the individuals who featured in the sterling performance have been forgotten." The Cornhuskers finished the season with a 4–3–2 record.

The Pitt starting lineup for the game against Nebraska was James MacMurdo (left end), Jesse Quatse (left tackle), Walter Milligan (left guard), Ralph Daugherty (center), Ernest Lewis (right guard), Charles Tully (right tackle), Paul Collins (right end), Edward Baker (quarterback), Warren Heller (left halfback), Josh Williams (right halfback) and James Clark (fullback). Substitutes appearing in the game for Pitt were Melvin Brown, Paul Reider, Edward Hirshberg, William Walinchus, Theodore Dailey and Hart Morris.

=== Carnegie Tech ===
Week 7: Carnegie Tech at Pitt

Team	1	2	3	4	Total
Carnegie Tech	0	0	0	6	6
• Pitt	0	7	0	0	7

- Date: November 8, 1930
- Location: Pitt Stadium
  Pittsburgh, PA
- Game start: 2:00 p.m.
- Game weather: sunny
- Referee: E. C. Taggart (Rochester)

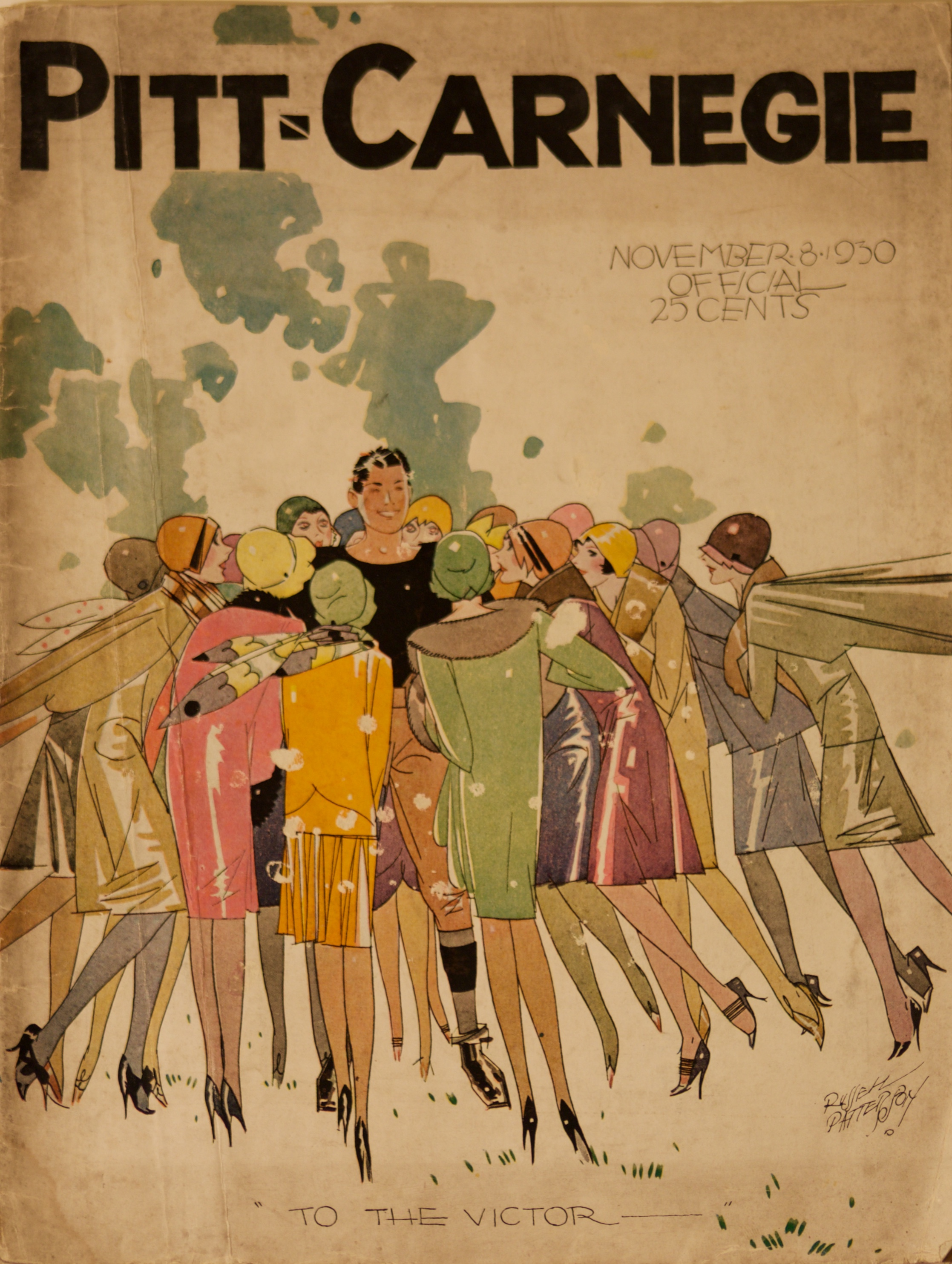
Program for November 8, 1930 Pitt vs. Carnegie Tech game

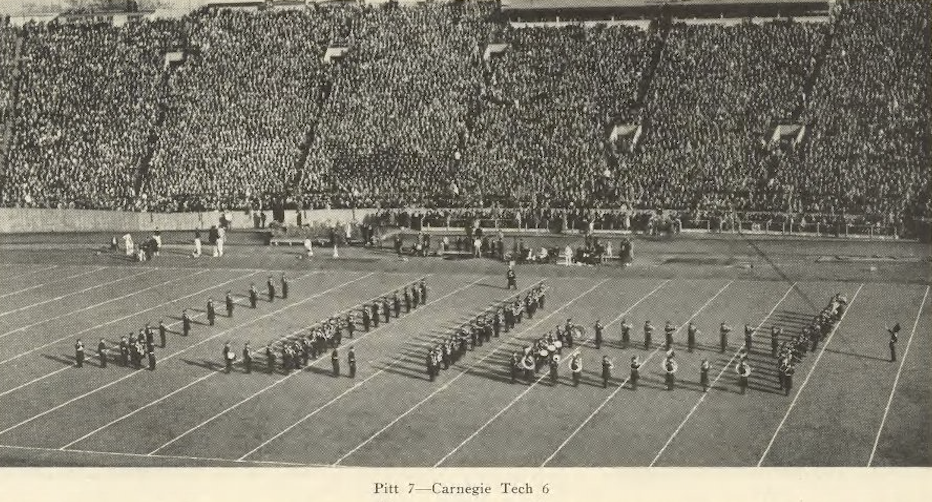
1930 University of Pittsburgh marching band halftime formation

On November 8 the Pittsburgh sports fans were treated to the seventeenth edition of the "City Game". Pitt led the series 12–4, but Tech had won 4 of the previous 7 games. Ninth-year coach Walter Steffen's Tartans were 4–2 on the season. Their victories came over Buffalo, Thiel, Georgia Tech and Western Reserve. They lost to National Champion Notre Dame (21–6), and then were upset by NYU (20–7).

With the exception of Paul Reider at right halfback for Josh Williams, Coach Sutherland used the same lineup as the Nebraska game. Carnegie Tech lost both starting tackle Don Fletcher and guard Bernard Buzio to injuries, but starting halfback George Kavel was cleared to play.

Both coaches sequestered their squads away from the campus distractions on Thursday night. Pitt was housed at the Chartiers Heights Country Club. Tech rested at the Mountain View Hotel in Greensburg.

Meanwhile, back in the city, several hundred Pitt students held a pep rally late on Friday afternoon. Then the Pitt band led a parade down Fifth Avenue. The students had obtained a permit for the parade from the Police Superintendent, but he did not inform his men. The police stopped the throng and demanded to see the permit. Students became rowdy as police on horseback tried to break up the crowd. 37 Pitt students were finally arrested. Early Saturday morning, the police and fire company were called to the Tech campus. The Tech students had started a bonfire using an oil soaked auto piled high with lumber. To the chagrin of the students the firemen arrived and put out the blaze. The Techies set a second car ablaze, and blocked off the street so the firemen could not disturb their celebration. When the police and firemen managed to circumvent the blockade and attempt to douse the second fire, the students were in their dorms. The students proceeded to pelt the responders with milk bottles, boiling water and firecrackers. 39 Carnegie students were arrested.

The Pitt Weekly analyzed the weekend chaos: "A definite conclusion from the developments of the pep parade is that in view of the increasing traffic in the downtown street and the likelihood that students will engage in small disorder along the lines of march, and the fact that the Pittsburgh police department is not organized to distinguish between minor disorders of this kind and major disorders requiring riot methods, parades in the downtown section of the city should be discouraged in the future."

The Pittsburgh Panthers retained the "City Championship Trophy" with a one-point victory over the Carnegie Tech Tartans - 7 to 6 - in front of over 52,000 fans. Tech earned 16 first downs to the Panthers 6. The Tartans out gained the Panthers 295 yards to 154. The Panther offense sustained a 54 yard drive in the second period, and Frank Hood plunged into the end zone from the 1-yard line to put the Panthers on the board. Eddie Baker was successful on the point after and Pitt led 7 to 0. The Pitt defense was the difference in the game. Late in the first half, after losing a fumble on their 7 yard line, the Panthers stopped a Tech drive on the one-foot line. In the final period Pitt fumbled a snap in punt formation, and Tech recovered on the Panther 14-yard line. Five plays later Tech fullback John Karcis scored. John Dreshar's extra point attempt was blocked by Pitt tackle Charles Tully, and Pitt went home the victor.

The Pitt starting lineup for the game against Carnegie Tech was James MacMurdo (left end), Jesse Quatse (left tackle), Walter Milligan (left guard), Ralph Daugherty (center), Ernest Lewis (right guard), Charles Tully (right tackle), Paul Collins (right end), Edward Baker (quarterback), Warren Heller (left halfback), Paul Reider (right halfback), and James Clark (fullback). Substitutes appearing in the game for Pitt were Edward Hirshberg, Frank Hood, William Walinchus, Joseph Tormey, Hart Morris, Theodore Dailey and Melvin Brown.

Prior to the contest "Pitt students paraded on the field with a coffin labeled, 'Here Lies Carnegie Tech.' "Wreck Tech" and 'N.Y.U. Started It, We'll Finish It' were inscribed on the sides of the coffin." The pall bearers pranced in front of the Tech stands. The Techies managed to steal the coffin and promised to return it, if the Panthers won the game. After the game the Pitt students went to retrieve their coffin and a melee ensued. Police appeared and 7 more students were taken to the precinct.

Scoring summary

Quarter	Time	Drive			Team	Scoring information	Score	
Quarter	Time	Plays	Yards	TOP	Team	Scoring information	Carnegie Tech	Pittsburgh
2		14	54		Pittsburgh	Frank Hood 1-yard touchdown run, Edward Baker kick good	0	7
4		5	14		Carnegie Tech	John Karcis 1-yard touchdown run, John Dreshar kick no good (blocked)	6	7
"TOP" = time of possession. For other American football terms, see Glossary of American football.							6	7

=== At Ohio State ===
Week 8: Pitt at Ohio State

Team	1	2	3	4	Total
Pitt	0	0	7	0	7
• Ohio State	7	3	6	0	16

- Date: November 15, 1930
- Location: Ohio Stadium
  Columbus, OH
- Game start: 2:00 p.m.
- Game attendance: 48,908
- Game weather: overcast
- Referee: James Masker (Northwestern)

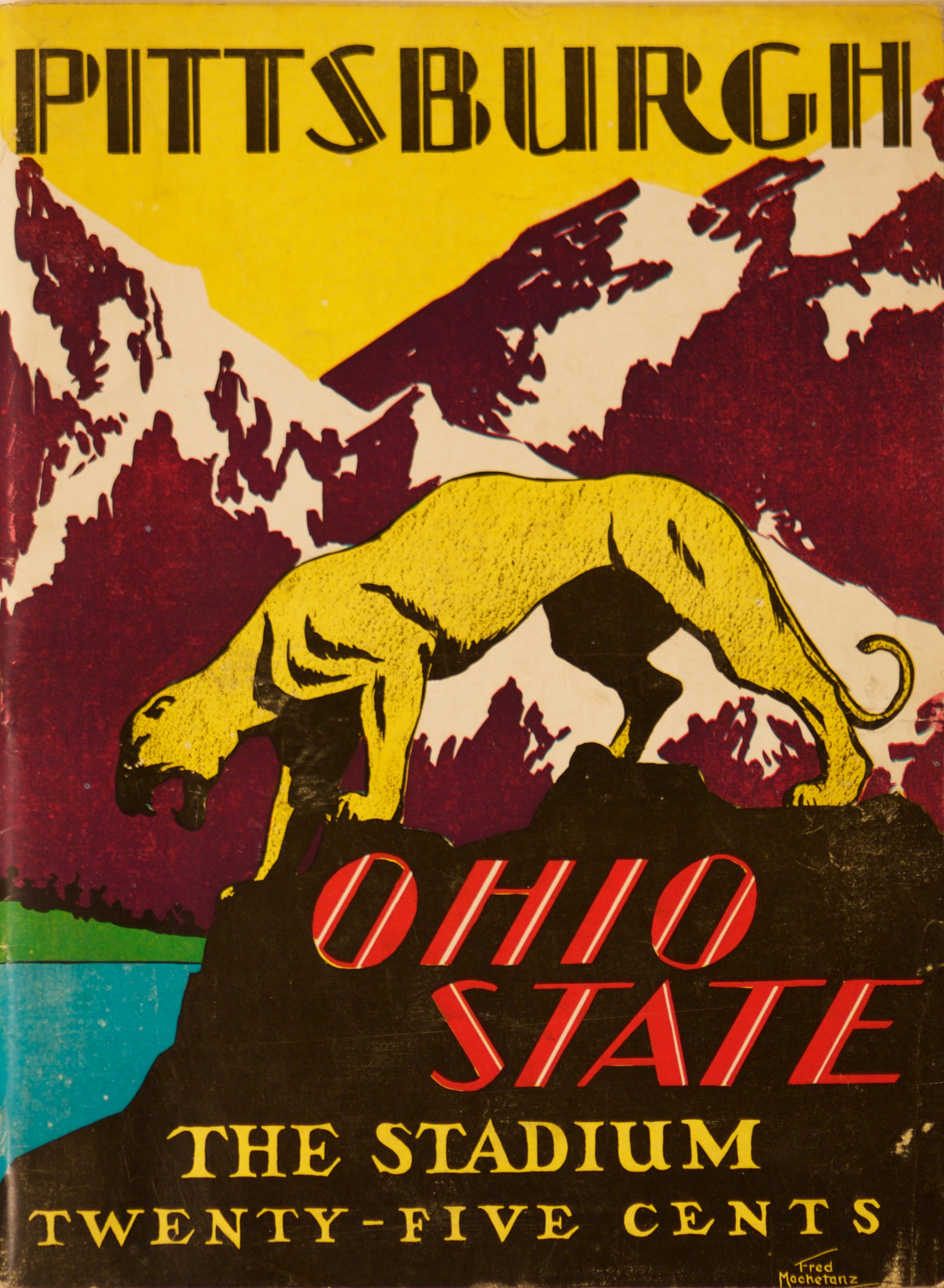
Program for November 15, 1930 Pitt vs. Ohio State game

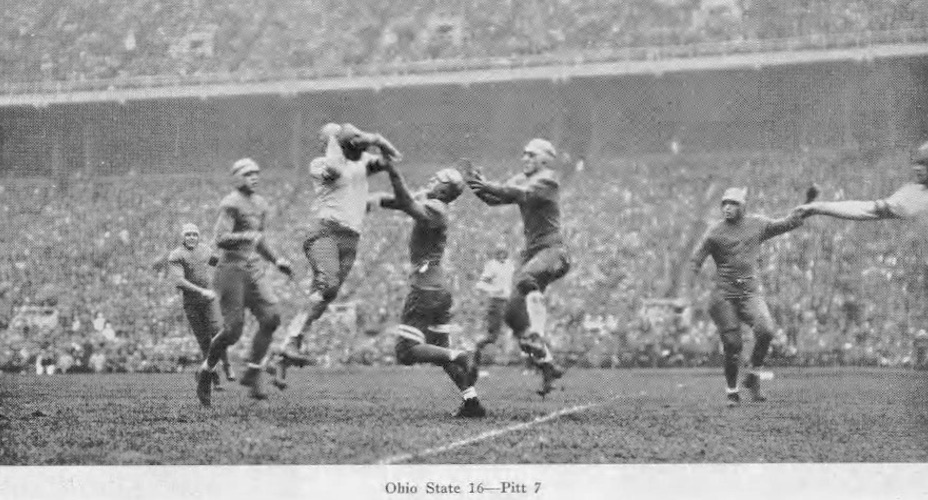
Photo from November 15, 1930 Pitt vs. Ohio State game

Pitt's final road trip of the season was to Columbus, OH to take on the Buckeyes of Ohio State. This marked the first time Pitt invaded Big Ten territory. The Ohioans, under second-year coach Sam Willaman, sported a 3–2–1 record. Wes Fesler, consensus first team All-American end, and Sam T. Selby, third team Central Press Assn. All-American guard, anchored the Buckeye line. The Cincinnati Enquirer reported: "The visitors are strongly favored to win, but by no great margin. Ohio is in good shape physically and mentally. The team is confident after the great way it clicked against Navy. The impetus of that (27–0) scoring spree is expected to carry over into the Pitt game tomorrow."

The Panthers arrived in Columbus on Friday evening and were housed at the Columbus Athletic Club. The 120-member Pitt band and several thousand students made the trip to take part in the Ohio State Homecoming festivities. The Post-Gazette noted that this was the fifth Homecoming the Panthers had participated in this season. Coach Sutherland's eleven was in fair shape, and he started the same lineup used in the Carnegie Tech game.

The Pitt Panthers initial trip to Western Conference (Big Ten) territory was not a rewarding experience, as the Buckeyes recorded a 16–7 Homecoming victory in front of 48,908 fans. The Buckeyes scored in the first quarter on an 8 play, 61 yard drive, culminating in a 16 yard touchdown pass from All-American Wes Fesler to Lewis Hinchman. Carl Ehrensberger kicked the extra point and Ohio led 7 to 0. Early in the second period Ehrensberger added a 15 yard field goal. Halftime score: Ohio State 10 to Pitt 0. Pitt received the second half kickoff. After gaining a first down, Frank Hood's pass to Paul Reider was intercepted by Martin Varner on the Panther 35-yard line. On second down Fesler completed a 34 yard pass to Robert Grady. Hinchman plunged into the end zone on the next play for his second touchdown of the game. Ralph Daugherty blocked the extra point. The Pitt offense proceeded to sustain an 81 yard drive for their touchdown. Hood scored on a 1 yard run through center. Edward Baker was successful on the point after to make the score Ohio 16 to Pitt 7. The Ohio State offense received the third quarter kick-off, advanced the ball to the Pitt 3-yard line, and lost the ball on downs. Late in the fourth quarter the Panther offense advanced the ball inside the State 5-yard line, but could not score. Ohio State finished the season 5-2-1.

Lester Biederman of the Pittsburgh Sun-Telegraph reported that Jock Sutherland was gracious in defeat when he spoke to Sam Wallaman: "I certainly want to congratulate you. It was a fine ball game and I think the better team won."

The Pitt starting lineup for the game against Ohio State was James MacMurdo (left end), Jesse Quatse (left tackle), Walter Milligan (left guard), Ralph Daugherty (center), Ernest Lewis (right guard), Charles Tully (right tackle), Paul Collins (right end), Edward Baker (quarterback), Warren Heller (left halfback), Paul Reider (right halfback) and James Clark (fullback). Substitutes appearing in the game for Pitt were Frank Hood, Theodore Dailey, Francis Seigel, Frank Walton, Edward Hirshberg, Melvin Brown and Joseph Tormey.

Scoring summary

Quarter	Time	Drive			Team	Scoring information	Score	
Quarter	Time	Plays	Yards	TOP	Team	Scoring information	Pittsburgh	Ohio State
1		8	61		Ohio State	Lewis Hinchman 16-yard touchdown reception from Wesley Fesler, Carl Ehrensberger kick good	0	7
2		5	33		Ohio State	15-yard field goal by Ehrensberger	0	10
3		4	35		Ohio State	Hinchman 2-yard touchdown run, Ehrensberger kick no good (blocked)	0	16
3		5	81		Pittsburgh	Frank Hood 1-yard touchdown run, Edward Baker kick good	7	16
"TOP" = time of possession. For other American football terms, see Glossary of American football.							7	16

=== Penn State ===
Week 9: Penn State at Pitt

Team	1	2	3	4	Total
Penn State	0	0	6	6	12
• Pitt	0	6	7	6	19

- Date: November 27, 1930
- Location: Pitt Stadium
  Pittsburgh, PA
- Game start: 2:00 p.m.
- Game weather: frigid
- Referee: W. G. Crowell (Swarthmore)

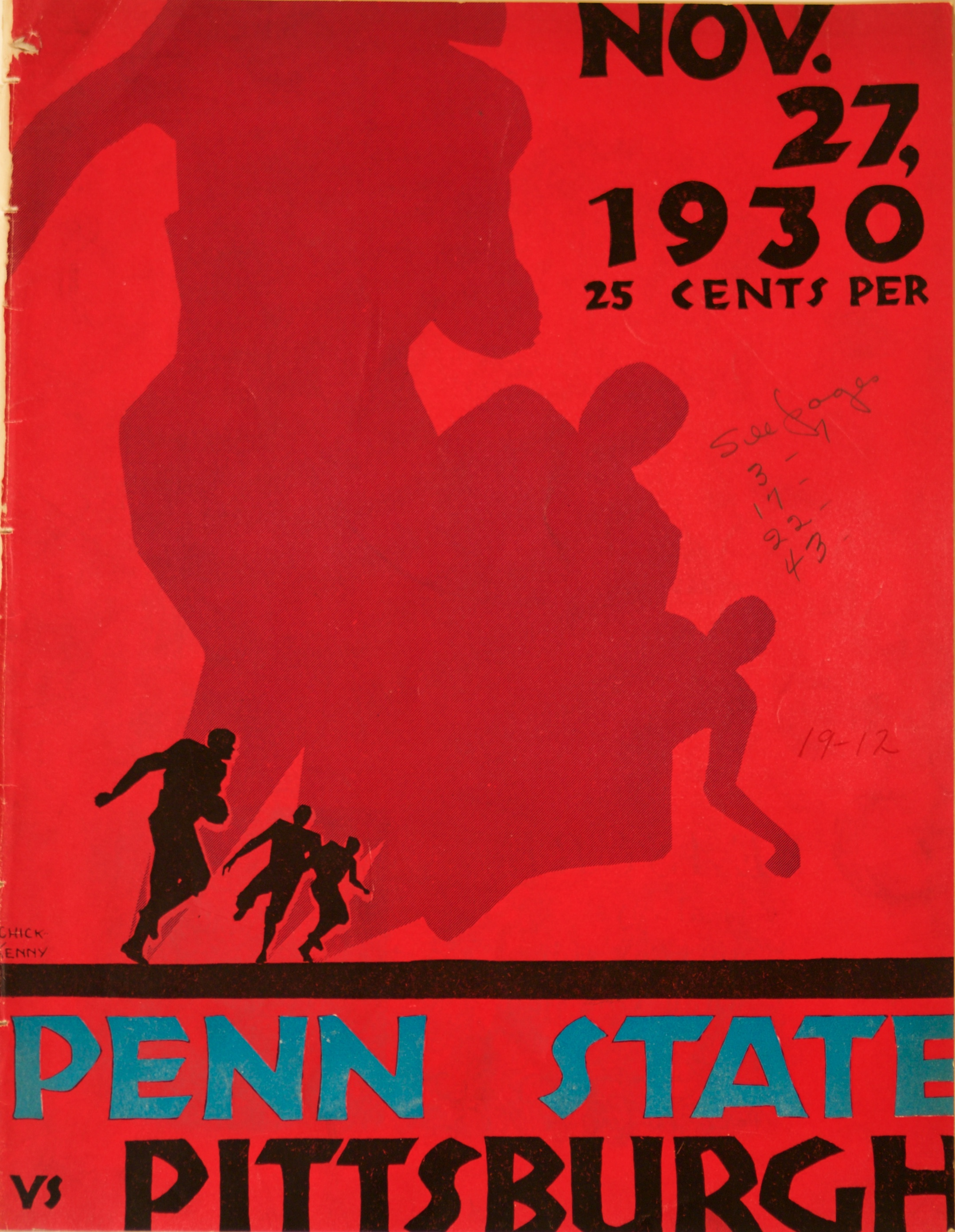
Program for November 27, 1930 Pitt vs. Penn State game

On Thanksgiving Day, the Panthers welcomed first year coach Bob Higgins and his Nittany Lions for their 33rd meeting on the gridiron. Pitt led the series 18–12–2. The Pittsburgh Press noted that the Lions, with their 3–3–2 record, were "desperately eager to score a win over Pitt, whom they have not beaten since 1919, when coach Higgins was a member of the team."

Coach Sutherland had never lost to Penn State as a player or coach, but this season he had to contend with a plethora of personnel issues. First string ends James MacMurdo and Paul Collins were suspended from the team for academic reasons; Starting guard Walter Milligan was injured against Ohio State and could not play; Starting center Ralph Daugherty skipped classes and practice for a week due to personal issues; and former starting halfback, Josh Williams, was ill. The Post-Gazette commented: "For years Pitt has entered the annual game an overwhelming favorite but because of injuries, illness and ineligibility the Panther presents a slightly patched up front for the battle with the traditional rivals from State College."

The Panthers kept their coach's unblemished record against Penn State intact as they beat the Nittany Lions 19–12 on the frigid turf of Pitt Stadium. In the second period, Pitt halfback Warren Heller broke loose on a 30 yard dash for his first touchdown. Edward Baker missed the conversion attempt, and Pitt led 6 to 0 at halftime. State tied the game early in the third quarter on a 3 yard plunge by George Lasich. Frank Diedrich missed the point after and the score was tied 6 to 6. J. Cooper French intercepted a Pitt pass and the State offense advanced the ball to the Pitt 25-yard line. Diedrich was wide left on a field goal attempt. Pitt took over on their 20-yard line. On first down Warren Heller raced 80 yards for his second touchdown. Baker was good on the conversion and Pitt led 13–6 at the end of three quarters. Early in the last quarter the Pitt offense sustained a 72 yard drive. The drive ended with a 9 yard scoring toss from Josh Williams to Baker. Baker missed the point after and Pitt led 19–6. Late in the quarter, Penn State end Earl Edwards blocked a Harry Wagner punt, caught the ball midair and rambled 26 yards for the last touchdown of the game. Joseph Miller missed the extra point. The Lions then recovered an onside kick, but could not advance the ball and Pitt won for the 9th year in a row. The Nittany Lions finished the season with a 3-4-2 record.

The Pitt starting lineup for the game against Penn State was Theodore Dailey (left end), Jesse Quatse (left tackle), Hart Morris (left guard), Joseph Tormey (center), Ernest Lewis (right guard), Charles Tully (right tackle), Edward Hirshberg (right end), Edward Baker (quarterback), Warren Heller (left halfback), Paul Reider (right halfback) and Frank Hood (fullback). Substitutes appearing in the game for Pitt were Ralph Daugherty, Walter Babic, Josh Williams, William Walinchus Harry Wagner, James Clark and Edward Schultz.

Scoring summary

Quarter	Time	Drive			Team	Scoring information	Score	
Quarter	Time	Plays	Yards	TOP	Team	Scoring information	Penn State	Pittsburgh
2		3	36		Pittsburgh	Warren Heller 30-yard touchdown run, Edward Baker kick no good	0	6
3		9	62		Penn State	George Lasich 3-yard touchdown run, Frank Diedrich kick no good	6	6
3		1	80		Pittsburgh	Heller 80-yard touchdown run, Baker kick good	6	13
4		16	72		Pittsburgh	Baker 9-yard touchdown reception from Josh Williams, Baker kick no good	6	19
4		1	26		Penn State	Blocked punt returned for touchdown by Earl Edwards, Joseph Miller kick no good	12	19
"TOP" = time of possession. For other American football terms, see Glossary of American football.							12	19

== Individual scoring summary ==
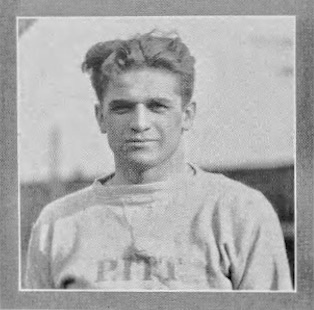
Edward Baker

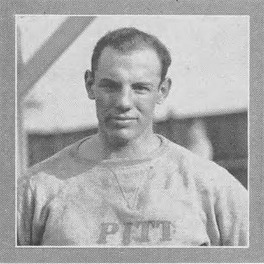
Warren Heller

1930 Pittsburgh Panthers scoring summary
Player	Touchdowns	Extra points	Field goals	Safety	Points
Franklin Hood	8	0	0	0	48
Edward Baker	5	12	0	0	42
Warren Heller	3	0	0	0	18
Melvin Brown	2	3	0	0	15
William Walinchus	2	0	0	0	12
Harold "Josh" Williams	2	0	0	0	12
James Clark	2	0	0	0	12
Paul Reider	2	0	0	0	12
Bucky Wagner	1	0	0	0	6
Zola Alpert	1	0	0	0	6
Rocco Cutri	0	1	0	0	1
team	0	0	0	1	2
Totals	28	16	0	1	186

== Postseason ==
Quarterback Edward Baker was chosen to play in the December 27, 1930 East-West Shrine Bowl held in San Francisco.

On December 15 at a private team banquet, coach Sutherland named end Edward Hirshberg captain for the 1931 Pitt football season and Charles D. Wettach, chairman of the athletic council, awarded letters for the 1930 season. The lettermen were Manager Walter Kearney, Captain Edward Baker, James Clark, Theodore Dailey, Ernest Lewis, Edward Hirshberg, Warren Heller, Franklin Hood, Edward Schultz, Paul Reider, Jack Kelly, Harry Wagner, Joseph Tormey, Jess Quatse, Walter Milligan, Ralph Daugherty, Hart Morris, Charles Tully, Harold Williams, William Walinchus and Al Ciper.

On February 3, the athletic council appointed Bernard Windt varsity football manager for the 1931 season. He was enrolled in the College, class of 1932. Bernard was an apprentice manager in 1928, an assistant manager in 1929 and the freshman team manager in 1930.

== All-American ==
- Edward Baker, quarterback (3rd team Newspaper Enterprise Association selected as follows: "In the selection of these All-America players, the opinions of more than 100 coaches and football writers have been confidentially consulted.")
