= 1929 All-Eastern football team =

American all-star college football team

The 1929 All-Eastern football team consists of American football players chosen by various selectors as the best players at each position among the Eastern colleges and universities during the 1929 college football season.

== All-Eastern selections ==
=== Quarterbacks ===
- Albie Booth, Yale (AP-1, UP-1 [hb], NEA-1)
- Barry Wood, Harvard (AP-2)
- Sam Buie, Duke (AP-2)
- Eddie Wittmer, Princeton (NEA-2)

=== Halfbacks ===
- Toby Uausa, Pittsburgh (AP-1, UP-1, NEA-1)
- Chris Cagle, Army (AP-1, UP-2, NEA-1)
- Clarke Hinkle, Bucknell (AP-2, NEA-2)
- Leslie Hart, Colgate (AP-2)
- Walter T. Masters, Penn (NEA-2)

=== Fullbacks ===
- Alton Marsters, Dartmouth (AP-1, UP-1 [qb], NEA-1)
- Clarke Hinkle, Bucknell (UP-1)
- Thomas Parkinson, Pittsburgh (AP-2, UP-2, NEA-2)

=== Ends ===
- Joe Donchess, Pittsburgh (AP-1, UP-1, NEA-1)
- Jim Douglas, Harvard (AP-1)
- Bates, Western Maryland (UP-1)
- Jerry Nemecek, NYU (AP-2, NEA-1)
- Harold E. Booma, Dartmouth (AP-2)
- Stan Yudicky, Dartmouth (NEA-2)
- Alzerini, Holy Cross (NEA-2)

=== Tackles ===
- Sam Wakeman, Cornell (AP-1, UP-1, NEA-1)
- Francis T. Vincent, Yale (AP-1)
- Forrest Douds, Washington & Jefferson (AP-2, UP-1, NEA-2)
- Ellsworth Armstrong, Dartmouth (UP-2, NEA-1)
- Jim Mooney, Georgetown (AP-2)
- Barfield, Princeton (UP-2, NEA-2)

=== Guards ===
- Ray Montgomery, Pittsburgh (AP-1, UP-1, NEA-1)
- Waldo W. Greene, Yale (AP-1, UP-1)
- Luby DiMeolo, Pittsburgh (AP-2)
- Bob Gillson, Colgate (AP-2)
- Walter Magai, Penn (UP-2, NEA-2)
- Dreshar, Carnegie Tech (NEA-2)

=== Centers ===
- Ben Ticknor, Harvard (AP-1, UP-1, NEA-1 [g])
- Tony Siano, Fordham (AP-2, UP-2, NEA-1)
- John Cox, Colgate (NEA-2)

== Key ==
- AP = Associated Press
- UP = United Press
- NEA = Newspaper Enterprise Association

== See also ==
- 1929 College Football All-America Team
