= Alton Marsters =

American football player

Dartmouth Big Green
- Position: Halfback
- Class: 1930

Career information
- High school: Arlington
- College: Dartmouth (1927–1929)

Awards and highlights
- First-team All-American (1929); Second-team All-American (1927); 2× First-team All-Eastern (1927, 1929)

Alton Marsters was an All-America college football running back at Dartmouth. He was known as "special delivery." Herman Olcott wrote him a letter on his deathbed.
