= Russ Saunders =

American football player (1906–1987)

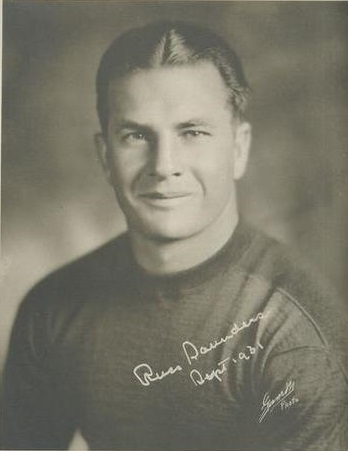

No. 18
- Position: Fullback

Personal information
- Born: January 26, 1906; Ardmore, Oklahoma, U.S.
- Died: April 28, 1987 (aged 81); Los Angeles, California, U.S.
- Listed height: 5 ft 9 in (1.75 m)
- Listed weight: 190 lb (86 kg)

Career information
- College: USC

Career history
- Green Bay Packers (1931)

Awards and highlights
- NFL champion (1931); Third-team All-American (1929); First-team All-PCC (1929)

Career NFL statistics
- Games played: 9
- Stats at Pro Football Reference

Stillwell Russell Saunders (January 1, 1906 – April 29, 1987) was an American professional football player who was a fullback in the National Football League (NFL). He played with the Green Bay Packers during the 1931 NFL season.

He was an All-American playing college football for the USC Trojans and was one of the models for the Tommy Trojan statue. He was most valuable player in the 1930 Rose Bowl when he led the Trojans to a 47–14 victory over the Pittsburgh Panthers.

After playing football, Saunders went on to a career in Hollywood. He was one of 11 All-American football players to appear in the 1930 film Maybe It's Love. In 1938 he was nominated for an Oscar for best Assistant Director for The Life of Emile Zola. He was assistant or Second Unit director on more than 85 films including PT 109, Hatari!, Arsenic and Old Lace, High Sierra and production manager for Stripes, The Amityville Horror and Bonnie and Clyde among others. His first screen appearance was in the 1927 movie The Drop Kick in which the 1927 USC team appeared. In that film, Saunders appeared along with John Wayne—a teammate from the USC team—and worked on many of Wayne's movies over the following decades.
