= 1929 All-America college football team =

The 1929 All-America college football team is composed of college football players who were selected as All-Americans by various organizations and writers that chose All-America college football teams in 1929. The seven selectors recognized by the NCAA as "official" for the 1929 season are (1) Collier's Weekly, as selected by Grantland Rice, (2) the Associated Press, (3) the United Press, (4) the All-America Board, (5) the International News Service (INS), (6) the Newspaper Enterprise Association (NEA), and (7) the North American Newspaper Alliance (NANA).

== Consensus All-Americans ==
Following the death of Walter Camp in 1925, there was a proliferation of All-American teams in the late 1920s. For the year 1929, the NCAA recognizes seven published All-American teams as "official" designations for purposes of its consensus determinations. Only two players, Notre Dame quarterback Frank Carideo and Pittsburgh end Joe Donchess, were unanimous first-team selections on all seven of the NCAA-recognized teams. The following chart identifies the NCAA-recognized consensus All-Americans and displays which first-team designations they received.

Name	Position	School	Number	Selectors First-team selections
Frank Carideo	Quarterback	Notre Dame	7/7	AP, UP, COL, NEA, INS, NANA, AAB
Joe Donchess	End	Pittsburgh	7/7	AP, UP, COL, NEA, INS, NANA, AAB
Bronko Nagurski	Tackle/Fullback	Minnesota	6/7	AP, UP, COL, NEA, INS, NANA
Jack Cannon	Guard	Notre Dame	6/7	AP, UP, COL, NEA, INS, AAB
Ben Ticknor	Center	Harvard	6/7	AP, UP, COL, INS, NANA, AAB
Ralph Welch	Fullback	Purdue	6/7	UP, COL, NEA, INS [hb], NANA, AAB
Ray Montgomery	Guard	Pittsburgh	5/7	UP, COL, NEA, INS, AAB
Elmer Sleight	Tackle	Purdue	4/7	AP, COL, INS, AAB
Francis Tappaan	End	USC	4/7	UP, NEA, NANA, AAB
Red Cagle	Halfback	Army	3/7	AP, COL, AAB
Gene McEver	Halfback	Tennessee	3/7	UP, NEA, NANA
Wes Fesler	End	Ohio State	2/7	AP, INS

== All-American selections for 1929 ==
=== Ends ===
- Joe Donchess, Pittsburgh (College Football Hall of Fame) (AP-1; UP-1; COL-1; NEA-1; INS-1; NANA-1; NYS-1; NYP-1; AAB-1; DW-1; LP-1; WT)
- Wes Fesler, Ohio State (College Football Hall of Fame) (AP-1; UP-2; NEA-2; INS-1; CP-1; NYS-2; NYP-2; DW-2; WT)
- Francis Tappaan, USC (AP-2; UP-1; NEA-1; INS-2; NANA-1; CP-2; NYS-2; NYP-1; AAB-1; DW-2)
- Wear Schoonover, Arkansas (College Football Hall of Fame) (AP-3; UP-2; COL-1; INS-3; NYS-1; DW-3; LP-1)
- Bob Tanner, Minnesota (NEA-2; NYP-2; DW-1)
- Vernon Smith, Georgia (College Football Hall of Fame) (AP-2; NEA-3)
- Paul L. Bates, Western Maryland (UP-3)
- Tom Churchill, Oklahoma (UP-3; NEA-3)
- Frank Baker, Northwestern (AP-3; NANA-2)
- Dale Van Sickel, Florida (College Football Hall of Fame) (CP-2)
- Buster Mitchell, Davis & Elkins (DW-3)
- Norton, California (INS-2; NANA-3)
- Donald Muller, Stanford (INS-3)
- Herster Barres, Yale (NANA-2)
- Tom Conley, Notre Dame (NANA-3)

=== Tackles ===
- Bronko Nagurski, Minnesota (College and Pro Football Hall of Fame) (AP-1; UP-1; COL-1; NEA-1; INS-1; NANA-1; CP-1 [fb]; NYS-1; NYP-1 [fb]; DW-2 [fb]; LP-1)
- Elmer Sleight, Purdue (AP-1; UP-2; COL-1; INS-1; NANA-2; CP-1; NYS-1; NYP-1; AAB-1; DW-1; LP-1; WT)
- Marion Hammon, SMU (UP-1; NYS-2; DW-2)
- George Ackerman, St. Mary’s (NYP-2; AAB-1; DW-1)
- Forrest Douds, Washington & Jefferson (AP-3; UP-2; NEA-2; INS-2; CP-1; WT)
- Fred Sington, Alabama (College Football Hall of Fame) (AP-3; UP-2 [g]; INS-2 [g]; NYP-1; DW-2 [g])
- Ray Richards, Nebraska (NEA-1; DW-3)
- Lou Gordon, Illinois (NEA-2; NANA-1)
- Samuel Wakeman, Cornell (AP-2; UP-3; NEA-3; INS-2; NANA-2; CP-2; NYP-2; DW-3)
- Ted Twomey, Notre Dame (AP-2; UP-3; INS-3; DW-2)
- John Utz, Penn (CP-2)
- Huntington, Colgate (NYS-2)
- Shields, Oregon (NEA-3)
- Bill Barfield, Princeton (NANA-3)
- Blimp Bowstrom, Navy (NANA-3)

=== Guards ===
- Jack Cannon, Notre Dame (College Football Hall of Fame) (AP-1; UP-1; COL-1; NEA-1; INS-1; NANA-3; CP-2; NYS-1; NYP-1; AAB-1; DW-1; LP-1; WT)
- Ray Montgomery, Pittsburgh (AP-2; UP-1; COL-1; NEA-1; INS-1; NANA-2; NYS-2; AAB-1; DW-1)
- Bert Schwarz, California (AP-1; UP-2; INS-3; NYS-1; DW-2; LP-1)
- Wade Greene, Yale (AP-2; CP-1; WT)
- Russ Crane, Illinois (CP-1)
- Mike Brumbelow, TCU (UP-3; NEA-3; DW-3)
- Fred Roberts, Iowa (UP-3)
- John B. Law, Notre Dame (AP-3)
- Ray Farris, North Carolina (AP-3; NEA-2)
- Nate Barragar, USC (INS-2; CP-2; DW-3)
- Gibson, Colgate (NYP-2)
- Luby DiMeolo, Pitt (INS-3 [t]; NYP-2)
- Bull Brown, Vanderbilt (NYS-2; NANA-1)
- Thomas A. Driscoll, Stanford (NEA-2)
- Paul Schwegler, Washington (College Football Hall of Fame) (NEA-3)
- Henry J. Anderson, Northwestern (INS-3; NANA-1)
- Weir, Illinois (NANA-2)
- Charles Humber, Army (NANA-3)

=== Centers ===
- Ben Ticknor, Harvard (College Football Hall of Fame) (AP-1; UP-1; COL-1; NEA-3; INS-1; NANA-1; CP-2; NYS-1; NYP-1 [g]; AAB-1; DW-1; LP-1; WT)
- Roy Riegels, California (AP-2; NEA-1; INS-3; CP-1)
- Walter Heinecke, Stanford (UP-2; NANA-3; NYS-2; DW-2)
- Tony Slano, Fordham (AP-3; UP-3; NEA-2; NANA-2; NYP-1)
- Tim Moynihan, Notre Dame (NYP-2)
- Marvin Jonas, Utah (DW-3)

=== Quarterbacks ===
- Frank Carideo, Notre Dame (College Football Hall of Fame) (AP-1; UP-1; COL-1; NEA-1; INS-1; NANA-1; CP-1; NYS-1; NYP-1; AAB-1; DW-1; LP-1; WT)
- Alton Marsters, Dartmouth (AP-2; INS-1 [hb]; NANA-1; CP-2; NYS-1 [hb]; NYP-2)
- Glen Harmeson, Purdue (UP-3; INS-3; NEA-3 [fb])
- Albie Booth, Yale (AP-3; INS-3 [hb]; NYS-2; NYP-1 [hb]; DW-3 [hb])
- Russ Saunders, USC (NEA-3; NANA-3)
- Barry Wood, Harvard (College Football Hall of Fame) (INS-2; NANA-2; NYP-2)

=== Halfbacks ===
- Red Cagle, Army (College Football Hall of Fame) (AP-1; UP-2 [qb]; COL-1; NEA-2 [qb]; INS-2; NANA-2; CP-2; NYS-2; NYP-2; AAB-1; DW-1; WT)
- Gene McEver, Tennessee (College Football Hall of Fame) (AP-2; UP-1; NEA-1; NANA-1; CP-1; NYP-2; DW-3)
- Willis Glassgow, Iowa (UP-2; COL-1; NEA-1; NYS-1; DW-3 [fb]; LP-1)
- Toby Uansa, Pitt (AP-1; UP-3; NEA-2; INS-2; NANA-3; CP-1; WT)
- Bill Banker, Tulane (AP-3; UP-3 [fb]; NEA-2; INS-3; NYP-1; AAB-1; DW-1; LP-1)
- Merle Hufford, Washington (UP-1)
- Fred "Stud" Stennett, St. Mary's (UP-2)
- Cy Leland, TCU (UP-3)
- Benny Lom, California (AP-3; NEA-2 [fb]; NANA-2)
- Lloyd Brazil, Detroit (NEA-3; INS-3 [fb]; DW-2 [qb])
- Dick Boyle, St. Mary's (NEA-3)
- Wittmer, Princeton (NANA-3)

=== Fullbacks ===
- Ralph Welch, Purdue (AP-2 [hb]; UP-1; COL-1; NEA-1; INS-1 [hb]; NANA-1; CP-2 [hb]; NYS-2 [hb]; AAB-1; DW-2 [hb])
- Pug Parkinson, Pitt (AP-2; UP-2; INS-1; NANA-2; NYS-1; NYP-2; DW-2 [hb]; LP-1; WT)
- Tony Holm, Alabama (AP-1; INS-2)
- Earl "Powerhouse" Pomeroy, Utah (AP-3; DW-1)
- C. Russell Bergherm, Northwestern (NANA-3; CP-2; NYS-2)

== Key ==
- **Bold** – Consensus All-American recognized by NCAA
- -1 – First-team selection
- -2 – Second-team selection
- -3 – Third-team selection

=== Selectors recognized by NCAA ===
- AAB = All-America Board of Football, consisting of Knute Rockne, "Pop" Warner, Tad Jones and W.A. Alexander
- AP = Associated Press, based on a nationwide opinion poll of 215 experts, including "newspaper sports editors and writers, Associated Press staff observers, officials and coaches in every section of the country."
- UP = United Press, "named by the United Press with the assistance and advice of more than 200 coaches, officials and experts from every part of the country"
- COL = Collier's Weekly as selected by Grantland Rice
- NEA = Newspaper Enterprise Association selected as follows: "In the selection of these All-America players, the opinions of more than 100 coaches and football writers have been confidentially consulted."
- INS = International News Service (later merged with UP to form UPI), based on "popular vote among sport writers and coaches, representing every major section of the country"; voters included Damon Runyon, Ford Frick, Tom Thorp, Dick Hylund, John Heisman, and Bill Corum
- NANA = North American Newspaper Alliance, selected by four noted coaches, Dan McGugin, Howard Jones, Bob Zuppke, and Bill Roper

=== Other selectors ===
- CP = Central Press Association, "selected by the readers of hundreds of client newspapers of the Central Press Association"
- NYS = New York Sun
- NYP = New York Post
- DW = Davis Walsh of the International News Service
- LP = Lawrence Perry: "Lawrence Perry selected his 1929 All-America football team after traveling many thousands of miles and watching most of the country's leading teams in play or practice"
- WT = Washington Times

== See also ==
- 1929 All-Big Six Conference football team
- 1929 All-Big Ten Conference football team
- 1929 All-Pacific Coast Conference football team
- 1929 All-Southern football team
- 1929 All-Southwest Conference football team
