= Ray Montgomery (American football) =

American football player and actor (1909–1966)

Pittsburgh Panthers
- Position: Guard

Personal information
- Born: February 1, 1909; Wheeling, West Virginia, U.S.
- Died: May 26, 1966 (aged 57); North Hollywood, California, U.S.
- Listed height: 6 ft 1 in (1.85 m)
- Listed weight: 188 lb (85 kg)

Career information
- College: Pittsburgh (1927–1929)

Awards and highlights
- Consensus All-American (1929); First-team All-Eastern (1929)

Adelbert Raymond Montgomery (February 1, 1909 – May 26, 1966) was an American football guard at the University of Pittsburgh. He was a consensus All-American in 1929.

== Playing career ==
Montgomery was a native of West Virginia. He played for the Pittsburgh Panthers football team under coach Jock Sutherland during the 1927, 1928 and 1929 seasons. In his senior year he helped the team go 9-0 that earned a trip to the Rose Bowl. That year, as a 6-foot, 1-inch, 188-pound guard, he was recognized as a consensus first-team All-American, having received first-team honors from several publications and organizations including Collier's Weekly (Grantland Rice) and United Press (UP).

== Outside of football ==
Montgomery appeared in the 1930 film "Maybe It's Love." The film, directed by William A. Wellman, was a genre football comedy starring Joan Bennett, Joe E. Brown, and members of the 1928 and 1929 All-American football teams including Otto Pommerening, Howard Harpster, Bill Banker, Tim Moynihan, Elmer Sleight, Paul Scull, Wear Schoonover, Russell Saunders and USC coach Howard Jones.

In later life, Montgomery was in the automobile business in North Hollywood, California. He died on May 26, 1966, in North Hollywood.
