= Frank Carideo =

American football player and coach

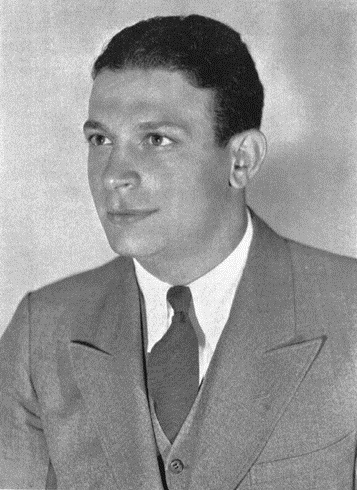

Biographical details
- Born: August 4, 1908; Mount Vernon, New York, U.S.
- Died: March 17, 1992 (aged 83); Ocean Springs, Mississippi, U.S.

Playing career

Football
- 1928–1930: Notre Dame
- Position: Quarterback

Coaching career (HC unless noted)

Football
- 1931: Purdue (assistant)
- 1932–1934: Missouri
- 1935–1938: Mississippi State (assistant)
- 1939–1942: Iowa (assistant)
- 1946–1949: Iowa (assistant)

Basketball
- 1935–1939: Mississippi State

Head coaching record
- Overall: 2–23–2 (football); 43–39 (basketball)

Accomplishments and honors

Championships
- 2× National (1929, 1930)

Awards
- 2× Unanimous All-American (1929, 1930)
- College Football Hall of Fame; Inducted in 1954 (profile)

Francis F. Carideo (August 4, 1908 – March 17, 1992) was an American football player and coach of football and basketball. He played quarterback at the University of Notre Dame from 1928 to 1930, where he was a two-time unanimous All-American. Carideo served as the head football coach at the University of Missouri from 1932 to 1934, compiling a record of 2–23–2. He was also the head basketball coach at Mississippi State University from 1935 to 1939, tallying a mark of 43–39. Carideo was inducted into the College Football Hall of Fame as a player in 1954.

== Biography ==
Carideo was born in Mount Vernon, New York. He attended the University of Notre Dame in South Bend, Indiana, where he played quarterback for coach Knute Rockne's Notre Dame Fighting Irish football team from 1928 to 1930. As a college football player he was considered so good, that even Rockne said he was the best quarterback ever. During the 1929 and 1930 seasons, the Fighting Irish posted a perfect 19–0 record with him as the starter, and he is remembered as a "big play maker."

Carideo was also an assistant coach at Purdue in 1931, at Mississippi State from 1935 to 1938, and at Iowa from 1939 to 1942 and 1946 to 1949.

In July 1931, he became engaged to Vera Imogene Crawley of Columbia, Mississippi. They were married on November 23 in the Administration Building at Notre Dame.

Carideo died in Ocean Springs, Mississippi in 1992; he was 83 years old.

== Head coaching record ==
=== Football ===
Year	Team	Overall	Conference	Standing
Missouri Tigers (Big Six Conference) (1932–1934)
1932	Missouri	1–7–1	1–3–1	5th
1933	Missouri	1–8	0–5	6th
1934	Missouri	0–8–1	0–5	6th
Missouri:		2–23–2	1–13–1	
Total:		2–23–2		

== See also ==
- Nina Quartero
