= Joe Donchess =

American football player (1905–1977)

No. 11
- Position: End

Personal information
- Born: March 17, 1905; Youngstown, Ohio, U.S.
- Died: January 30, 1977 (aged 71); Hinsdale, Illinois, U.S.
- Listed height: 6 ft 0 in (1.83 m)
- Listed weight: 175 lb (79 kg)

Career information
- College: Pittsburgh (1927–1929)

Awards and highlights
- Unanimous All-American (1929); First-team All-Eastern (1929)
- College Football Hall of Fame (Class of 1979)

Joe Donchess (March 17, 1905 – January 30, 1977) was an American football player at the University of Pittsburgh. He was a unanimous All-American at end while playing on the 1929 university's football team under head coach Jock Sutherland. In 1937 Joe became Assistant Chief Surgeon at U.S. Steel and then Chief Surgeon there in 1943, a position he held until his retirement in 1965. He was elected to the College Football Hall of Fame in 1979.
