= Tim Moynihan =

American football player and coach (1907–1952)

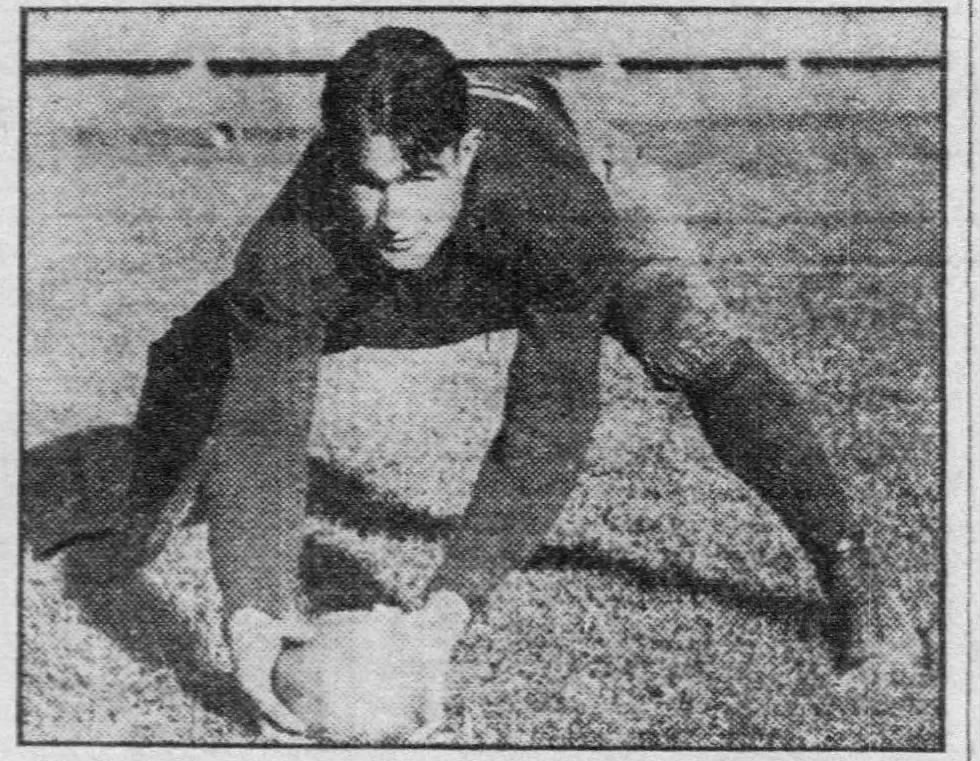

Profile
- Position: Center

Personal information
- Born: September 23, 1907; Chicago, Illinois, U.S.
- Died: April 4, 1952 (aged 44); Orange, California, U.S.

Career information
- College: Notre Dame

Career history
- 1932–1933: Chicago Cardinals

Awards and highlights
- National champion (1929); Third-team All-American (1928)

Timothy Anthony Moynihan (September 23, 1907 – April 4, 1952) was an American football player and coach. He played professionally for two seasons in the National Football League (NFL) with the Chicago Cardinals. Moynihan played as a center at the University of Notre Dame under head coach Knute Rockne and was a member of the undefeated 1929 team. He served as an assistant football coach at Notre Dame, Texas, Denver, and Georgetown. He coached interscholastic football at St. Xavier College in Cincinnati. He coached baseball at the University of Denver.

Moynihan was one of 11 All-American football players to appear in the 1930 film Maybe It's Love.

He died in Los Angeles on April 4, 1952, from injuries sustained during an automobile accident.
