= The College Widow =

The College Widow may refer to:

- The College Widow (play), a 1904 play by George Ade, and basis for later works
- The College Widow (1915 film), starring Ethel Clayton
- The College Widow (1927 film), starring Dolores Costello

== See also ==
- Maybe It's Love (1930 film), starring Joan Bennett, another adaptation of the play
