= Frederick Truesdell =

American actor (1872-1937)

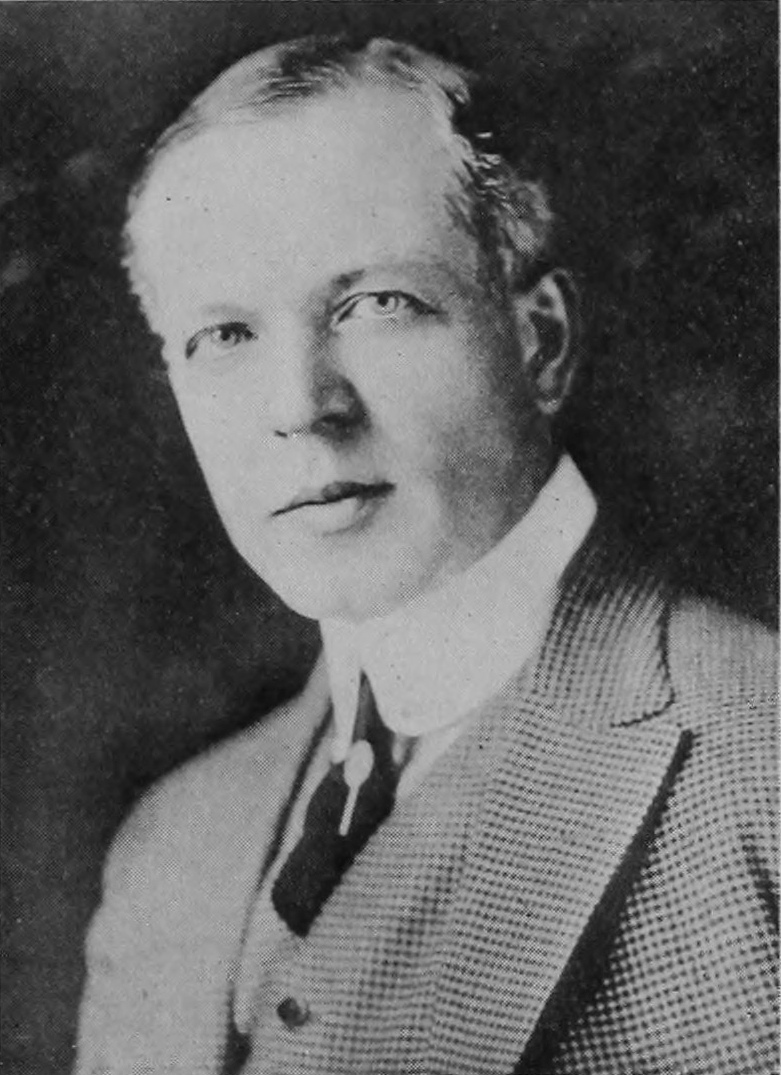
- Born: George Frederick Truesdell c. January 15, 1872; Montclair, New Jersey, U.S.
- Died: May 3, 1937; Manhattan, New York, U.S.
- Resting place: Oakwood Cemetery, Syracuse, New York, U.S.
- Other names: G. Frederick Truesdell
- Education: Yale University (BA)
- Occupations: Actor, poet
- Spouse(s): Carolyn Dare Westcott (m. 1896) Laura Nelson Hall (m. 1907–1912; div.) Helene Hichellier (m. ?–1930; his death)
- Father: George Truesdell

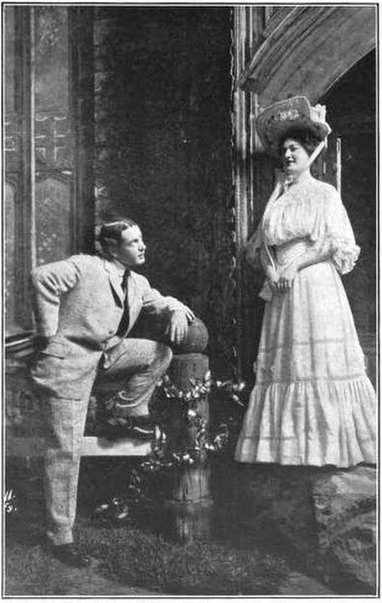
Frederick Truesdell and Dorothy Tennant in a scene from The College Widow

George Frederick Truesdell (c. 1872–1937), commonly known by the stage name Frederick Truesdell, was an American actor of stage and film. He also wrote poetry for Scribner's Magazine.

== Life and career ==
George Frederick Truesdell was born c. January 15, 1872, in Montclair, New Jersey. He was the son of Frances Martha (née Prindle) and Col. George Truesdell, an American Civil War veteran and businessman in Washington, D.C.. He graduated with a B.A. degree in 1895 from Yale University.

Truesdell was married three times: Carolyn Dare Westcott on July 7,1896; followed by a married to actress Laura Nelson Hall from 1907 until 1912, ending in divorce; and to Helene Hichellier.

Truesdell died on May 3, 1937, in his home in Manhattan.

== Theater ==
- The College Widow (play) (1904,) as star football player Billy Bolton
- Alma, Where Do You Live? (1910), as Renault
- National Red Cross Pageant (1917), as The Papal Legate
- The Gold Diggers (1915)
- The Apple Cart (1930), Theatre Guild

== Film ==
- The Wishing Ring: An Idyll of Old England (1914)
- The Boss (1915)
- Alias Jimmy Valentine (1915) as Lt. Gov. Fay
- Hearts of Exile (1915) as Captain Sokaloff
- Camille (1915) as the Count de Varville
- The Deep Purple (1915) as Inspector
- La Boheme (1916) as Author
- The Man Who Forgot (1917) as Congressman Mannersley (*as Frederick C. Truesdell)
- A Daughter of Maryland (1917)
- The Greatest Power (1917) as Professor Poole
- The Marriage Market (1917) as Eric Foxhall
- The Beloved Adventuress (1917) as Morgan Grant
- A Man's World (1918) as Malcolm Gaskell
- The Panther Woman (1918) as Beverly's Father
- My Own United States (1918) as Mr. Pendleton
- Shadows (1919) as Frank Craftley
- The Great Victory (1919) as Woodrow Wilson
- Fine Feathers (1921)
- Pleasure Mad (1923) as John Hammond
- The Love Piker (1923) as Mr. Warner
- Chastity (1923) as Fergus Arlington
- The Age of Desire (1923) as Malcolm Trask (credited as Frank Truesdell)
- The Beauty Prize (1924) as Eric Brandon
