= Children of Destiny =

1920 film

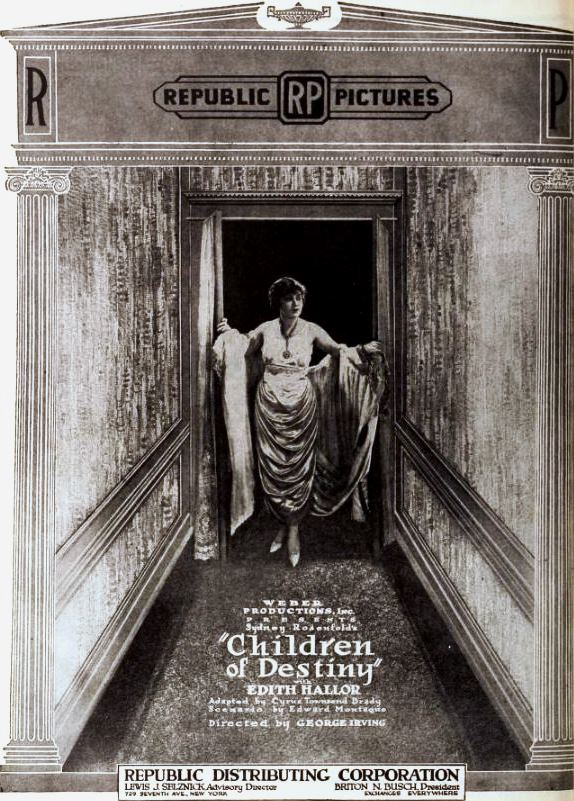
- Magazine Ad
- Directed by: George Irving
- Story by: Cyrus Townsend Brady; Edward J. Montagne
- Based on: Children of Destiny by Sydney Rosenfeld
- Produced by: Weber Productions
- Starring: Edith Hallor
- Distributed by: Republic Distributing Corporation
- Release date: May 1920
- Running time: 6 reels
- Country: United States
- Language: Silent (English intertitles)

Children of Destiny is a 1920 American silent film drama directed by George Irving and starring Edith Hallor and Emory Johnson.

== Cast ==
| Actor | Role |
|---|---|
| Edith Hallor | Isabelle Hamlin / Rose Hamlin |
| William Courtleigh Jr | Richard Hamlin |
| Arthur Edmund Carewe | Count Di Varesi |
| Emory Johnson | Edwin Ford |
| Frederick Garvin | Larry Steers |
