= Dan Collyer =

Dan Collyer

Dan Collyer (c. 1853 – March 30, 1918; born Daniel McInerney) was an American actor, dancer, and singer. He was a performer in minstrel shows and vaudeville from the 1860s into the early 20th century. He also performed in musicals and plays on Broadway.

== Biography ==
Collyer was born in Baltimore, Maryland, in about 1853. He began performing on the stage in his native city at the age of 14, beginning in variety theatre. By early 1869 he was leading his own clog dancing act in Baltimore. He was mentored by the boxer and entertainer Sam Collyer from who he took the performance name Dan Collyer. By October 1869 he was performing in blackface minstrel shows in conjunction with sparring exhibitions featuring Sam Collyer in which he was billed as Sam's son, Dan Collyer. In addition to boxing in the shows, Sam would perform song and dance numbers with Dan. They were still performing together at the Front Street Theater in Baltimore in 1879.

Dan Collyer became a well-known blackface entertainer in vaudeville and also toured with a variety of minstrel shows. He was also acted in the legitimate theatre, and in 1878 he arrived on the New York stage at the Eagle Theatre as Bob Mawley in John Brougham's play The Lottery of Life. In 1879 he performed in the burlesque The Pie-Rats of Penn Yan, a spoof of The Pirates of Penzance, at the Fifth Avenue Theatre. In 1880 he began performing in variety entertainments at Tony Pastor's 14th Street Theatre in New York, and by November of that year he was starring opposite Lillian Russell in the show Needles and Hairpins at that theatre. He later appeared alongside Russell at the same theatre in Gilbert and Sullivan's Patience in 1882. He was a member of the stock theatre company at the 14th Street Theatre during the 1880s, taking on a wide repertoire from low comedy roles to serious dramatic problems to blackface parts and other character roles.

In 1885 Collyer succeeded Tony Hart, spending five years as Edward Harrigan's stage partner, often at Broadway's Park Theatre. In 1890 he toured in The Soudan by Henry Pettitt and Augustus Harris. In 1896, he appeared at the Bijou Theatre in New York in Marty Malone in which he sang the song "Savannah Sue" by David Braham and Harrigan. Later that season he took on a blackface female impersonation role as Jane in A Florida Enchantment (1896, Hoyt's Theatre).

As the valet Tobias, Collyer sang the popular coon song "I'm Fraid dis Snap is Most too Good to Last" by A. Baldwin Sloane in the musical Papa's Wife, which played at the Manhattan Theatre on Broadway in 1899–1900. He portrayed trainer Matty McGowen in the play The College Widow (1904, Garden Theatre). He reprised this role in the Jerome Kern, Guy Bolton, and P. G. Wodehouse musical Leave It to Jane, which played at the Longacre Theatre with Edith Hallor in the title role in 1917–1918. In 1914 he performed the role of Croker in Glen MacDonough and Jean Gilbert's musical The Queen of the Movies at the Globe Theatre on Broadway.

Collyer died on March 30, 1918.
