= Beauty Prize =

Beauty Prize may refer to:

- The Beauty Prize, a 1923 musical comedy, with music by Jerome Kern, book and lyrics by George Grossmith and P. G. Wodehouse
- The Beauty Prize (film), an unrelated 1924 film directed by Lloyd Ingraham and starring Viola Dana
- Prix de Beauté (Beauty Prize), a 1930 film starring Louise Brooks
