= Freshman Love =

1936 film by William C. McGann

- Directed by: William C. McGann
- Screenplay by: Earl Felton; George Bricker
- Based on: The College Widow; 1904 play by George Ade
- Produced by: Bryan Foy
- Starring: Patricia Ellis; Frank McHugh
- Cinematography: Sidney Hickox
- Edited by: James Gibbon
- Music by: Leo F. Forbstein
- Distributed by: Warner Bros. Pictures
- Release date: January 18, 1936
- Running time: 65 minutes; 7 reels
- Country: United States
- Language: English

Freshman Love is a 1936 American musical comedy film based on George Ade's oft filmed 1904 play The College Widow, adaptations of which were filmed twice previously, in 1915 and 1927, and parodied by the Marx Brothers in their 1932 film Horse Feathers. This version is directed by William C. McGann and is a comedy-musical starring Patricia Ellis.

This is Lloyd Bridges' first film.

A print is preserved at the Library of Congress.

== Plot ==
Male students are tricked into joining Billings College's rowing team when the coach, Speed Hammond, is able to persuade the school president's attractive daughter, Joan Simpkins, to recruit them.

Bob Wilson is one of the rowers, but due to a problem with his grades, he ends up enrolling under a phony name. Adversaries try everything, even music, to distract the Billings crew during the big race, but the team holds on for victory.

== Cast ==
- Patricia Ellis as Joan Simpkins
- Warren Hull as Bob Wilson
- Frank McHugh as Coach Speed Hammond
- Mary Treen as Squirmy
- Joseph Cawthorne (as Joseph Cawthorn) as Bob Wilson Sr. Z
- Alma Lloyd as Sandra
- George E. Stone as E. Predergast Biddle
- Henry O'Neill as President Simpkins
- Anita Kerry as Princess Oggi
- Johnny Arthur as Fields
- Walter Johnson as Tony Foster
- Joseph Sawyer as Coach Kendall
- Florence Fair as Mrs. Norton
- Spec O'Donnell as Eddie
- Joseph King as Terry Biddle
- William Moore as Editor
- Ben Hall as Goofy freshman
- Nestor Aber as Third goof
- Bill Carew as Student at soda fountain

uncredited

- Lloyd Bridges
- William Carey
- Virginia Dabney - Co-Ed
- Don Downen - Second Goof
- Jerry Fletcher - Leader of Tango Band
- Tommy Hicks - College Boy
- Robert Emmett Keane - Announcer
- Joe King - Terry Biddle
- Edmund Mortimer - Henderson
- George Noisom - Harmonica Player
- Broderick O'Farrell - Member of Board of Trustees
- Peter Potter - Vindicator Editor
- Dick Purcell - Radio Announcer
- Harry Seymour - Oggi's Barker
- Michael Stuart - Third Goof
- Fred "Snowflake" Toones - Mose
- Ruth Warren - Marie, Housemother
- Jack Wise - Oggi's Attendant
- Sam Wolfe - Harmonica Player
- Jane Wyman - Co-Ed
