= Gertrude Quinlan =

American actress

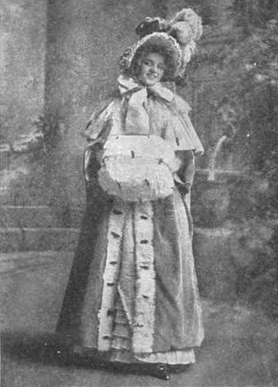
Gertrude Quinlan as "Marietta" in La bohème, with Castle Square Opera Company

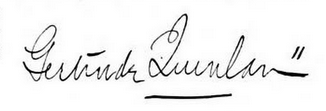
Gertrude Quinlan signature

Gertrude Quinlan (February 25, 1875 [or February 23, 1880] [or February 23, 1877, according to 1900 census] – November 29, 1963) was an American actress of soubrette roles, singing in over 125 operas.

Quinlan spent most of her youth in Boston. Before she finished school, she made her first appearance with the Castle Square Opera Company, then located in Boston. She sang in the chorus for about two years and she was entrusted with small speaking parts, gradually working her way up to be principal soubrette. In this capacity, she sang with the Castle Square forces in New York City, Philadelphia, Baltimore, Washington D.C., Chicago, and St. Louis. She varied her operatic experience a bit by playing part of a season in a melodrama entitled "The Red, White and Blue." The season of 1901–02, Quinlan originated Annette in "King Dodo," and the two seasons following this, she was Chiquita in "The Sultan of Sum." It was the fall of 1904, she created Flora Wiggins in "The College Widow", and she played the part three years. Quinlan established herself as a comedienne, in opera and comedy.

== Early years and education ==
Sources differ on Quinlan's birthplace and date. In some biographical entries she was born in Boston, Massachusetts, while others sources state she was raised in Boston yet born in Vermont. Her birth date is listed as February 25, 1875, (Note: Her birth year is stated as 1875, without date, by Bryan.) although at least one source lists a birth date of February 23, 1880. She was a daughter of Michael Charles and Ellen (Barret) Quinlan and the fifth in a family of seven girls. Her father was a schoolmaster in Ireland. Since he came to the United States and settled in Boston, he lived in retirement.

Quinlan was graduated at the Franklin Grammar School in Boston in 1892, and during the school year of 1893 she attended the Girls' High School in that city. From the age of four years, she sang in various church and charity concerts, and, knowing that she possessed a natural and exceptional soprano voice, she determined in her early years to cultivate that gift and make it her means of livelihood, whether it did or did not win her a reputation in the operatic world. Her voice had constant training since the day she entered the chorus. She studied under Franklyn Smith, of Boston, Frederic Bruegger, of Chicago, and Karl Brenneman, of New York.

== Career ==
Her career advanced despite her parents' objections and a lack of money for training. She obtained her parents consent at 23, she entered the chorus of the Castle Square Opera Company, singing at the Castle Square Theatre, Boston, in May, 1895. She remained there one year, learning the score of a new opera each week, and rehearsing one for the following week, while singing in two performances daily. She was often taken from the chorus and given one or two lines, an honor for a girl not 16 and with only a few months' experience.

In May, 1896, she accompanied the Castle Square Opera Company to Philadelphia, and sang with them at the Grand Opera House for a year and a half. While there, she became understudy to Clara Lane, and was often called upon to sing her roles without rehearsal to give herself confidence.

Quinlan's first appearance in New York was at the American Theatre, January 17, 1898, in "The Lily of Killarney," taking the part of Anne Shute. During the following summer, she played one of the two principals in "Red, White, and Blue," a war drama, with Raymond Hitchcock, creating the character of Hetty Hall, an American girl, the company making a tour of the small cities around New York. This was followed by "Shenandoah" at the Academy of Music, where she characterized Junie Buckthome, the General's daughter, until in the summer of 1901 when she rejoined the Castle Square Opera Company at the Studebaker Theatre in Chicago. She sang in Chicago two seasons.

Quinlan sang in over 125 operas, and played all the principal soubrette parts in the same. She made her first distinct success as Broni Slava in the "Beggar Student," and became an especial favorite as Pitti Sing in The Mikado while in Chicago. She was also a piquant comedienne, and made progress toward fame since her appearance in the comic opera, "Tarantella," as Junie, in 1901. The next year, she was given the part of Annette in the cast of "King Dodo," and during the season of 1902–1903, she was Chiquita at the Tremont Theatre in Boston and Wallack's Theatre, New York.

She was always under the management of the Castle Square Opera Company, and rendered them several important services, which naturally advanced her in their estimation and in her profession. Quinlan was not a member of any societies or clubs, but a most devoted parishioner of the Roman Catholic church.

In 1916, Quinlan married John Henry O'Neil. She died in New York City on November 29, 1963.
