= Leave It to Jane =

Musical by Jerome Kern, Guy Bolton and P. G. Wodehouse

Leave it to Jane
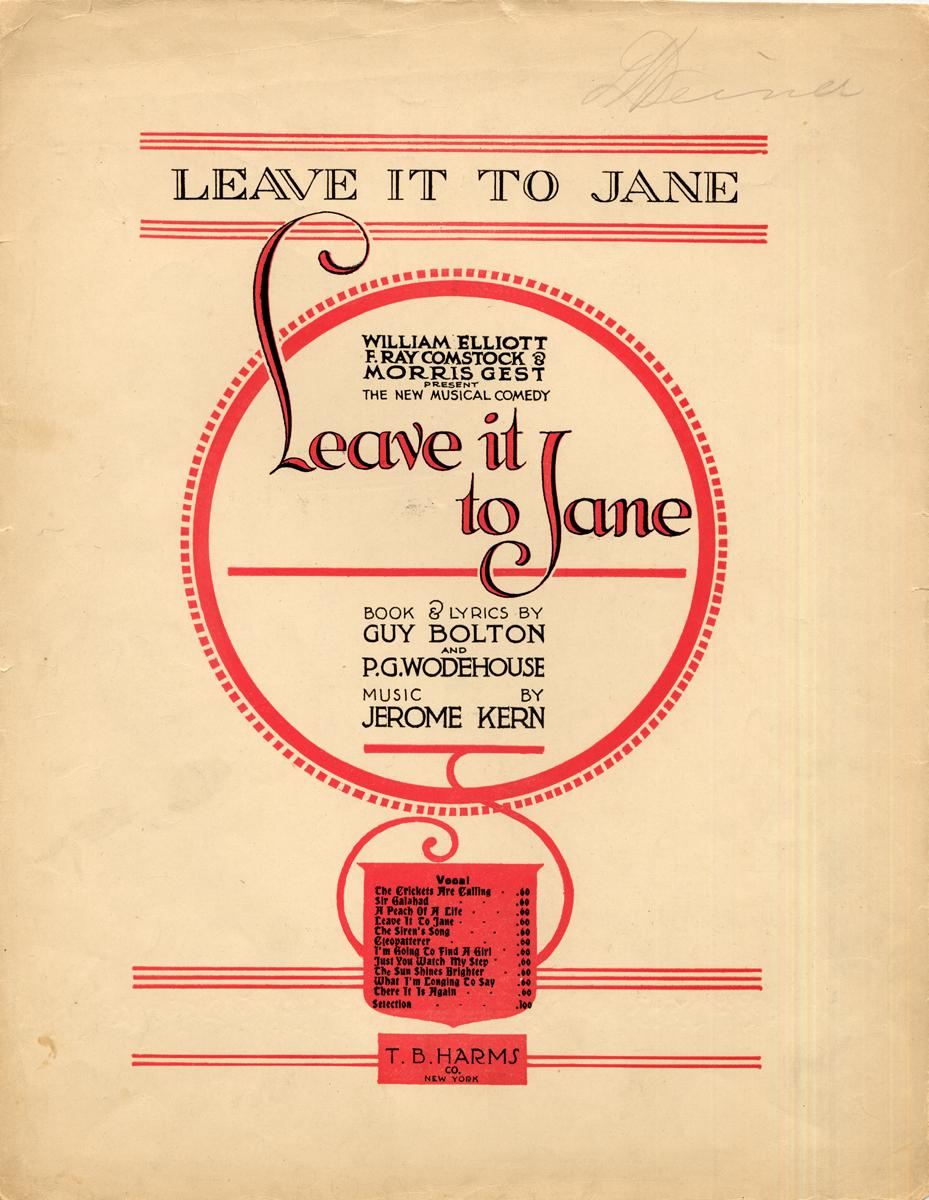
- Sheet music from the title song
- Music: Jerome Kern
- Lyrics: Guy Bolton; P. G. Wodehouse
- Book: Guy Bolton; P. G. Wodehouse
- Basis: The College Widow, by George Ade
- Productions: 1917 Broadway production 1959 Off-Broadway production

Leave It to Jane is a musical in two acts, with music by Jerome Kern and book and lyrics by Guy Bolton and P. G. Wodehouse, based on the 1904 play The College Widow, by George Ade. The story concerns the football rivalry between Atwater College and Bingham College, and satirizes college life in a Midwestern U.S. town. A star halfback, Billy, forsakes his father's alma mater, Bingham, to play at Atwater, to be near the seductive Jane, the daughter of Atwater's president.

The musical was created for the Princess Theatre, but another of the "Princess Theatre Shows", Oh, Boy!, was a long-running hit at the Princess at the same time; so Leave It to Jane premiered instead at the Longacre Theatre on Broadway in 1917. and had a long-running Off-Broadway revival in 1959. Some of the best-known songs are "A Peach of a Life", "Leave It to Jane", "The Crickets Are Calling", "The Siren’s Song", "Sir Galahad" and "Cleopatterer".

== Background ==
Early in the 20th century, American musical theatre consisted of a mix of elaborate European operettas, like The Merry Widow (1907), British musical comedy imports, like The Arcadians (1910), George M. Cohan's shows, American operettas, like those of Victor Herbert, ragtime-infused American musicals, and the spectacular revues of Florenz Ziegfeld and others. As Cohan's and Herbert's creative output waned, new creative talent on Broadway included composer Jerome Kern, who began by revising British musicals to suit American audiences, adding songs that "have a timeless, distinctly American sound that redefined the Broadway showtune."

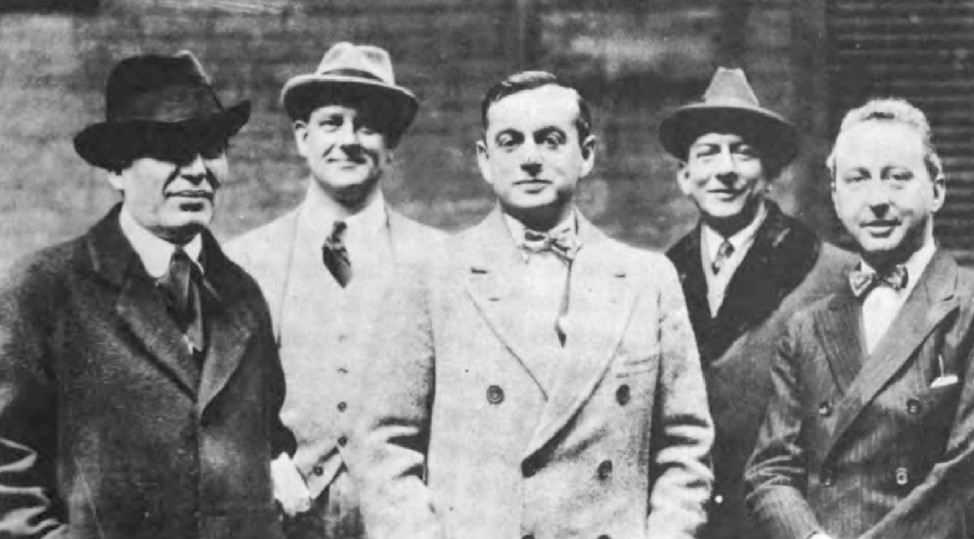
Morris Gest, Wodehouse, Bolton, F. Ray Comstock and Kern, c. 1917

In 1914, Theatre agent Elisabeth Marbury asked Kern and a new playwright, Guy Bolton, to write a series of musicals specifically tailored to the small Princess Theatre with an intimate style and modest budgets, that would provide an alternative to the Ziegfeld reviews, elaborate operettas and imported shows. Kern and Bolton's first Princess Theatre musical was Nobody Home (1915), an adaptation of a London show called Mr. Popple of Ippleton. Their second was an original musical called Very Good Eddie (1915). This little show ran for 314 performances on a modest budget. British humorist and lyricist/playwright P. G. Wodehouse had supplied some lyrics for Very Good Eddie and joined the team at the Princess for Oh, Boy!, which opened in February 1917, becoming a hit. In their collaborations, Bolton wrote most of the book, with Wodehouse writing the lyrics. According to Bloom and Vlastnik, Oh, Boy! represents "the transition from the haphazard musicals of the past to the newer, more methodical modern musical comedy ... remarkably pun-free [with plots that were] natural and unforced. Charm was uppermost in the creators' minds ... the audience could relax, have a few laughs, feel slightly superior to the silly undertakings on stage, and smile along with the simple, melodic, lyrically witty but undemanding songs".

== Productions ==
With Oh, Boy! playing at the Princess, Leave It to Jane had to open at another Broadway house, the Longacre Theatre, on March 29, 1917. Like the Princess Theatre shows, it featured modern American settings, eschewing operetta traditions of foreign locales and elaborate scenery. The authors sought to have the humor flow from the plot situations, rather than from musical set pieces. In 1918, Dorothy Parker described in Vanity Fair how the team's shows integrated story and music: "Bolton and Wodehouse and Kern are my favorite indoor sport. I like the way they go about a musical comedy. ... I like the way the action slides casually into the songs. ... I like the deft rhyming of the song that is always sung in the last act by two comedians and a comedienne. And oh, how I do like Jerome Kern's music."

Leave It to Jane ran for a modestly successful 167 performances, directed by Edward Royce and choreographed by David Bennett. Though the critics liked the music and lyrics, as well as the cast generally, they were most impressed by Georgia O'Ramey in the comedy role of Flora.

An Off-Broadway revival opened on May 25, 1959 at the Sheridan Square Playhouse and ran for more than two years (958 performances), and the cast recorded the show's first cast album, starring Kathleen Murray (later Kathleen Hallor) as Jane. A young George Segal had a small part. The show is occasionally still staged, including a 1985 production at Goodspeed Opera House starring Rebecca Luker.

== Synopsis ==
Act I

On the first day of the new school term, at "Good Old Atwater" College in Indiana is having difficulty assembling a first-rate football team to pit against its arch-rival school, Bingham. Matty McGowan, the team's coach, is discouraged. "Stub" Talmadge returns from vacation with news of a prospect, "Silent" Murphy, a muscular ex-piano mover who will be a great center; they just need to convince the President that Murphy is a real student. Bessie, Stub's girlfriend, is the local golf champ; the two wonder about married life ("A Peach of a Life"). Stub is trying to avoid Flora Wiggins and her mother, to whom he owes $18 in back rent for the room at their boarding house.

Beautiful Jane Witherspoon is much sought after by the college boys and even by Professor Talbot, who has a crush on her, but her philosophy is to "Wait 'Til Tomorrow", but everyone knows that if there is a problem, "Leave It to Jane". Her father, the President of Atwater, gets a visit from his old friend Hiram Bolton, a chief donor to the rival Bingham College. On Bolton's way out Stub foolishly bets him that Atwater will beat Bingham in the big Thanksgiving Day game. Bessie arrives with news that the all-American halfback, Billy Bolton of Minnesota, is joining the team at Bingham; they realize that he must be Hiram Bolton's son. If he joins Bingham, Atwater's chances are zero. Bessie asks Jane to help lure Billy Bolton to Atwater with promises of academic and athletic success and possible romance.

On meeting her, the handsome Billy is enchanted; Jane turns on the charm for the good of the school: it's an emergency after all! ("The Crickets Are Calling"). Jane plans for Billy to enroll at Atwater under an assumed name to fool her father. Hon. Elan Hicks is a southern politician who has secured a place at Atwater for his shy and gawky son, Bub. Nevertheless, Bub hits it off with the waitress daughter of Stub's landlady, Flora ("Cleopatterer"), and he begins to become fashionable. Meanwhile, Jane tricks Billy into giving her his fraternity pin and attending that evening's formal dance at Atwater. It pains Jane to be misleading Billy. She wryly notes that modern women are not so different from the legendary sirens.

At the ball that evening, Jane uses all of her seductive powers on Billy, who eventually agrees to stay at Atwater and change his name to Elmer Staples. All are delighted with this outcome ("*Something to Say"), and all assume that Jane will dump Billy after the big game is over.

Act II

Outside the stadium the following Thanksgiving Day, everyone is excited about the big game ("Football Song"). The game is close, and, unfortunately, "Silent" Murphy suffers an injury. Senator Hicks is appalled to find that his son, Bub, has become quite a "sport" at college ("The Days of Chivalry", a/k/a Sir Galahad). Hiram Bolton has discovered the deception and is furious. When he accuses Jane of using her feminine wiles to ensnare his son, she pretends to swoon into Billy's arms, instructing the boys and Stub to get rid of Bolton until after the game. They manhandle him into a taxi, and Billy wins the game with an impressive run. Everyone is overjoyed at Atwater, Stub and Bessie proclaim their love ("The Sun Shines Brighter"), and all the boys describe what sort of girl they have been seeking ("I'm Going to Find a Girl (Someday)").

Billy's father tells his son that Jane has fooled him, and heartbroken Billy decides to leave Atwater. Stub then demands that Bolton pay up on their bet. Bolton is unexpectedly impressed that, after having kidnapped him, Stub would show such initiative and nerve, and so he offers Stub a job. Bub thinks that with Billy out of the picture, Jane will be on the market, and he breaks his engagement with Flora. It's not all bad news for Flora, however, as Stub pays off his debt for rent, and she gets an offer from coach McGowan. Happy about the money from his winnings, Stub and Bessie become engaged. Just as Billy prepares to leave, Jane begs his forgiveness for her deception but reveals that she has fallen in love with him. Billy must honor his agreement to take a job with his father, but he asks Jane to wait for him, and all ends happily.

== Songs ==
Act I

- Good Old Atwater – Male Ensemble
- A Peach of a Life – Stub Talmadge and Bessie Tanner
- Wait 'Till Tomorrow – Jane Witherspoon and Boys
- (Just You) Watch My Step – Stub, Louella Banks and Girls
- Leave It to Jane – Jane, Stub, Bessie and Girls
- The Crickets Are Calling – Jane and Billy Bolton
- When the Orchestra's Playing Your Favorite Waltz (There it is Again) – Billy and Town Girls
- Cleopatterer – Flora Wiggins
- Something to Say – Jane and Billy

Act II

- Football Song – Bessie and Ensemble
- The Days of Chivalry (Sir Galahad) – Stub, Flora and Harold "Bub" Hicks
- Football Song (Reprise) – Ensemble
- The Sun Shines Brighter (I'm So Happy) – Bessie and Stub
- The Siren's Song – Jane, Bessie and Girls
- I'm Going to Find a Girl (Someday) – Stub, Bub, Ollie Mitchell, Louella, Marion Mooney and Cissie Summers

== Roles and original cast ==
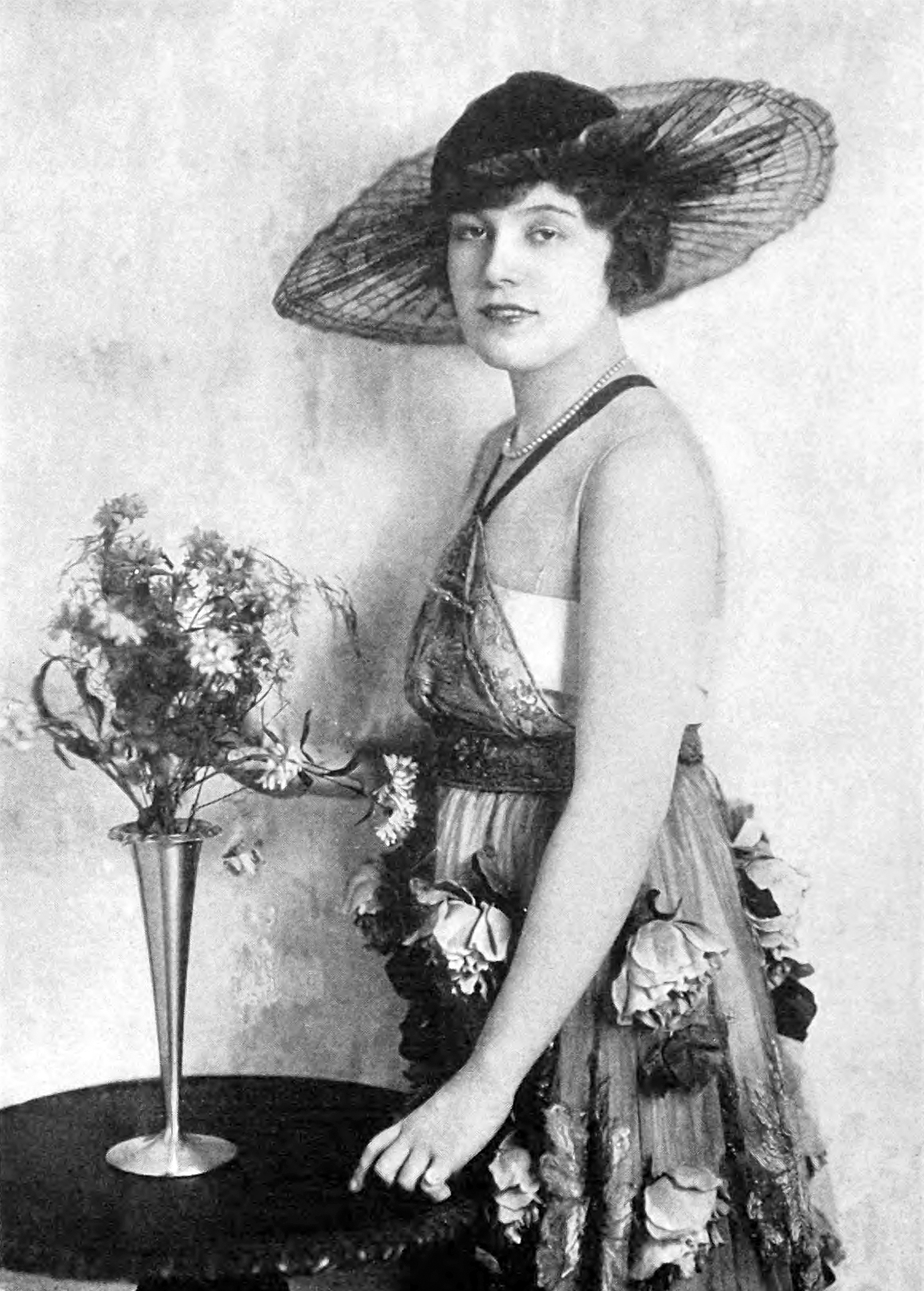
Edith Hallor as Jane in the original Broadway production of Leave It to Jane

- Ollie Mitchell (a sophomore) – Rudolf Cutten
- Matty McGowan (a coach) – Dan Collyer
- "Stub" Talmadge (a busy undergraduate) – Oscar Shaw
- "Silent" Murphy (a center rush) – Thomas Delmar
- Peter Witherspoon (President of Atwater) – Frederic Graham
- Bessie Tanners (an athletic girl) – Anna Orr
- Flora Wiggins (a prominent waitress) – Georgia O'Ramey
- Howard Talbot (a professor) – Algernon Grieg
- Jane Witherspoon (daughter of Peter Witherspoon) – Edith Hallor
- Hiram Bolton (benefactor of Bingham College) – Will C. Crimans
- Billy Bolton (a half-back) – Robert G. Pitkin
- Hon. Elan Hicks (of Squantunville) – Allan Kelly
- Harold "Bub" Hicks (a freshman) – Olin Howland
- Louella Banks – Arline Chase
- Marion Mooney – Helen Rich
- Cissie Summers – Tess Mayer
- Students, faculty, townies etc.

== Critical reception ==
The musical received good notices. The critic Gilbert Seldes commented that Wodehouse's lyrics "had the great virtue which Gilbert's lyrics had and which, I am told, the comic verses of Molière and Aristophanes also have: they say things as simply as you would say them in common speech, yet they sing perfectly." In The New York Evening World, Charles Darnton praised "Mr. Kern's sprightly tunes and ... verses that added to the joy of song. You are sure to like Leave It to Jane." The New York Times praised the cast generally, but the paper was most impressed by Georgia O'Ramey in the comedy role of Flora.

== In other media ==
Excerpts from the musical are featured in the 1946 MGM Jerome Kern tribute Till the Clouds Roll By, in which June Allyson plays Jane and sings the title song and "Cleopatterer".
