= The Blue Pearl (1920 film) =

1920 film

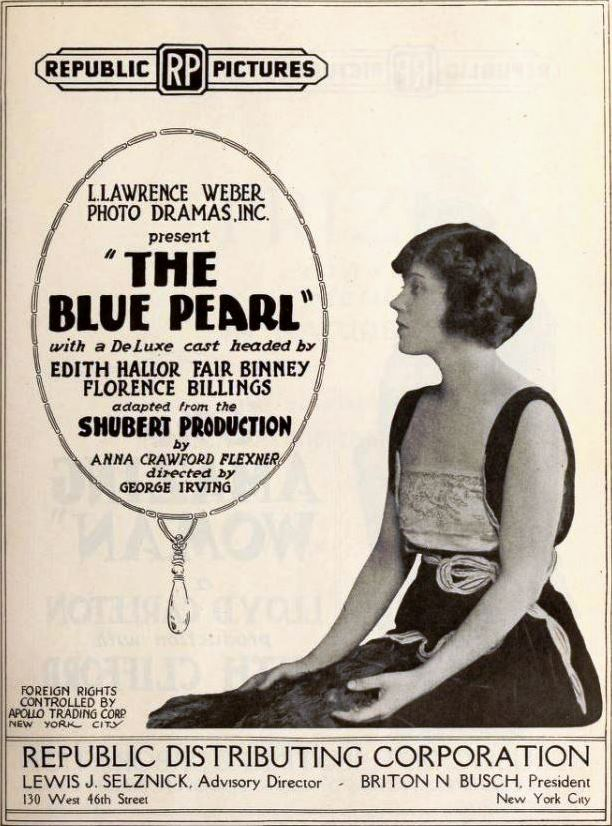
- Directed by: George Irving
- Written by: Emma Bell Clifton
- Based on: The Blue Pearl by Anne Crawford Flexner
- Starring: Edith Hallor; Lumsden Hare; Earl Schenck
- Cinematography: Max Schneider
- Production company: L. Lawrence Weber Photo Dramas
- Distributed by: Republic Distributing Corporation
- Release date: March 1920
- Running time: 60 minutes
- Country: United States
- Languages: Silent; English intertitles

The Blue Pearl is a 1920 American silent mystery film directed by George Irving and starring Edith Hallor, Lumsden Hare and Earl Schenck. It is based on the 1918 play of the same title by Anne Crawford Flexner.

== Cast ==
- Edith Hallor as Laura Webb
- Lumsden Hare as Holland Webb
- Earl Schenck as Penrose Trent
- John Halliday as Richard Drake
- Corliss Giles as Wilfred Scott
- D.J. Flanagan as Frederick Thurston
- H. Cooper Cliffe as Major Topping
- Faire Binney as Angelica Topping
- Florence Billings as Sybil Trent

== Bibliography ==
- Ken Wlaschin. Silent Mystery and Detective Movies: A Comprehensive Filmography. McFarland, 2009.
