= Laura Nelson Hall =

American actress

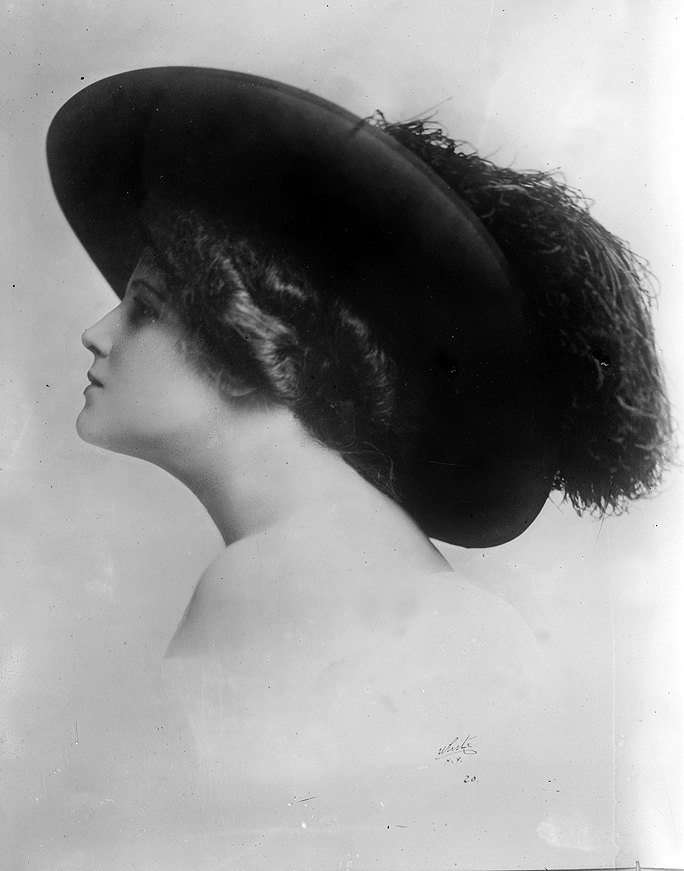
- Hall circa 1915
- Born: Laura Barnhurst; 11 July 1876; Philadelphia, Pennsylvania, U.S.
- Died: 11 July 1936 (aged 60); New Rochelle, New York, U.S.
- Occupation: Actress
- Years active: 1897–1915
- Agent: Augustin Daly
- Spouses: Ned Howard Fowler (m. 1903; died 1904) Frederick Truesdell (divorced): Louis Oscar Rutis

Laura Nelson Hall (born Laura Barnhurst, July 11, 1876 – July 11, 1936) was an actress in theater and vaudeville stock companies in the late 19th century and early 20th century.

== Life and career ==
Hall was born in Philadelphia, Pennsylvania and made her stage debut there with the Girard Avenue Stock Company on September 13, 1897, in a play called Our Friends. The following year she appeared in a supporting role in the original production of The Moth and the Flame along with Herbert Kelcey and Effie Shannon. This bit part earned her considerable notice and a new manager, Augustin Daly. With Daly's, Hall's star was quick to rise, and she went on to get better parts, landing a large role in The Great Ruby, An Enemy to the King, and a spot on a national tour or The Purple Lady.

This string of successes carried Hall through to Broadway, where one of her more successful plays was Sydney Rosenfeld's farce The Two Escutcheons, which had an uncommonly long run at New York City's Bijou Theatre in 1899.

From New York, Hall headed west, appearing with the Ralph Cummings Stock Company on the Pacific Coast as well as at the Grand Opera House San Francisco, and from between 1900 and 1901 she supported such stars as Joseph Haworth, Edwin Arden, Walter Perkins, and Minnie Seligman. When she finally returned to the East, it was for a part in Paul Armstrong's drama, St. Ann which she followed up with a long engagement at Columbus, Ohio's Empire Stock Company.

Despite laudatory reviews in the press for her Midwestern showings, misfortune struck in Hall's life. In January 1904, her husband, the actor Ned Howard Fowler, committed suicide. Hall was with Fowler when he shot himself, along with her personal physician, Dr. Starling Wilcox. The doctor had been called to attend the young actor, who was "exceedingly nervous" from overwork. Hall and Fowler were both employed by the Empire, and had just wed after arriving with their troupe in Columbus.

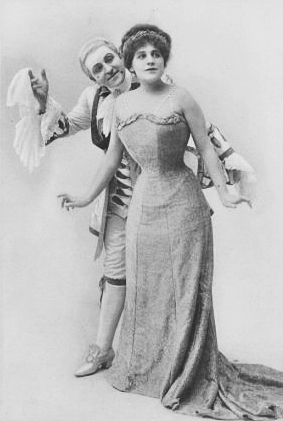
A promotional photograph in Theatre Magazine advertising Hall's role in Everywoman by Walter Browne. The play premiered at the Herald Square Theatre in New York on 27 Feb 1911.

Hall wasted no time getting back to work, however. She soon became a leading lady of the Arden Stock Company in Washington, D.C. before moving on to New Orleans, Louisiana. There she became even more prominent, appearing with the Grand Opera House Stock Company. In October 1905 she was the featured actress in a production of A Modern Magdalene. The New Orleans Times-Picayune praised her work in the play, commenting about her role as Katinka, The young and beautiful leading lady is a most capable actress, and it would be more difficult to imagine a more intelligent interpretation of the role than that given by Miss Hall.

Her reputation continued to climb when Hall finally returned to New York in 1907. Her play, The Coming of Mrs. Patrick opened at the Madison Square Theatre, on 24th Street, in November 1907, with Hall in the title role. Local reviews of her performance were highly positive: "Mrs. Patrick possesses a joy of living which contrasts with her family whose other members are cantankerous and brooding." Another observer noted that there was "a wholesomeness, a breadth of style and a sympathetic quality in the acting of Miss Hall that make her an ideal selection for this particular role."

The following year, Daly's Theatre on Broadway presented Girls in April, and Hall was in the original cast but was ultimately replaced by Bessie Toner. Hall was in a three-act drama, New York which premiered at the Garrick Theatre in Philadelphia, Pennsylvania, in September 1910. Produced by William J. Hurlbut, the play was introduced at the Columbia Theater in Washington, D.C., several weeks later.

A 1910 staging of Children of Destiny at the Savoy Theatre, 112 West 34th Street (Manhattan), was given a negative review by one critic who called it clumsy. Hall's participation was received in a more positive light. She was credited with conveying an underlying gentleness and sweetness of character. The play was a drama in three acts, another Rosenfeld composition.

The first production of Everywoman by Walter Browne came at the Herald Square Theatre in February 1911. Hall was in the production together with Patricia Collinge and Wilda Bennett.

Hall was in two motion pictures. They were most likely produced in or around New York where the film industry was still centered and near stage actors. They are Dope (1914) and The Stubbornness of Geraldine (1915).

Hall died on her 60th birthday in New Rochelle, New York on July 11, 1936.

== Major roles ==
=== Theatre ===
- 1907: The Coming of Mrs. Patrick [Mrs. Patrick] by Rachel Crothers. Prod. Walter N. Lawrence. Haoyt's Theatre, New York.
- 1908: Girls [Pamela Gordon] by Clyde Fitch. Based on a play by Alexander Engel and Julius Horst. Dir. Clyde Fitch Musical Dir. George Martens. Daly's Theatre, New York.
- 1909: The Easiest Way [Elfie St. Clair] by Eugene Walter. Dir. David Belasco. Stuyvesant Theatre, New York.
- 1909: The Sins of Society by Cecil Raleigh and Henry Hamilton. Dir. Lawrence Marston and Ernest D'Auban. New York Theatre, New York.
- 1910: Children of Destiny by Sydney Rosenfeld. Dir. Sydney Rosenfeld. Savoy Theatre, New York.
- 1910: New York by William J. Hurlbut. Prod. A. H. Woods. Bijou Theatre, New York.
- 1911: Everywoman; Her Pilgrimage in Quest of Love [Everywoman], Music by George Whitefield Chadwick; Written by Walter Browne; Musical Director: Hugo Frey.
- 1913: The Poor Little Rich Girl [Mother] by Eleanor Gates. Prod. Arthur Hopkins. Hudson Theatre, New York.
- 1914: What It Means to a Woman by E. H. Gould and F. Whitehouse.Prod. H. H. Frazee. Longacre Theatre, New York.
- 1918: Her Honor, the Mayor by Arline Van Ness Hines. Prod. Actors' and Authors' Theatre. Fulton Theatre, New York.
- 1921: The Survival of the Fittest [Katherine Willard] by George Atkinson. Greenwich Village Theatre, New York.
- 1921: The Easiest Way [Elfie St. Clair] by Eugene Walter. Dir. David Belasco. Lyceum Theatre, New York.

=== Film ===
- 1915: The Stubbornness of Geraldine. Based on the play by Clyde Fitch. Dir. Gaston Mervale.
- 1914: Dope. [Mrs. Binkley] by Herman Lieb. Based on the play by Joseph Medill Patterson.
