= College Love =

1929 film

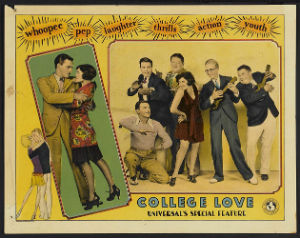
- Theatrical release poster
- Directed by: Nat Ross
- Screenplay by: John B. Clymer; Pierre Couderc; Leonard Fields; Albert DeMond
- Story by: Leonard Fields
- Produced by: Carl Laemmle Jr.
- Starring: George J. Lewis; Eddie Phillips; Dorothy Gulliver; Churchill Ross; Hayden Stevenson; Sumner Getchell
- Cinematography: George Robinson
- Edited by: Ted J. Kent; Richard Cahoon
- Production company: Universal Pictures
- Distributed by: Universal Pictures
- Release date: July 7, 1929
- Running time: 80 minutes
- Country: United States
- Language: English

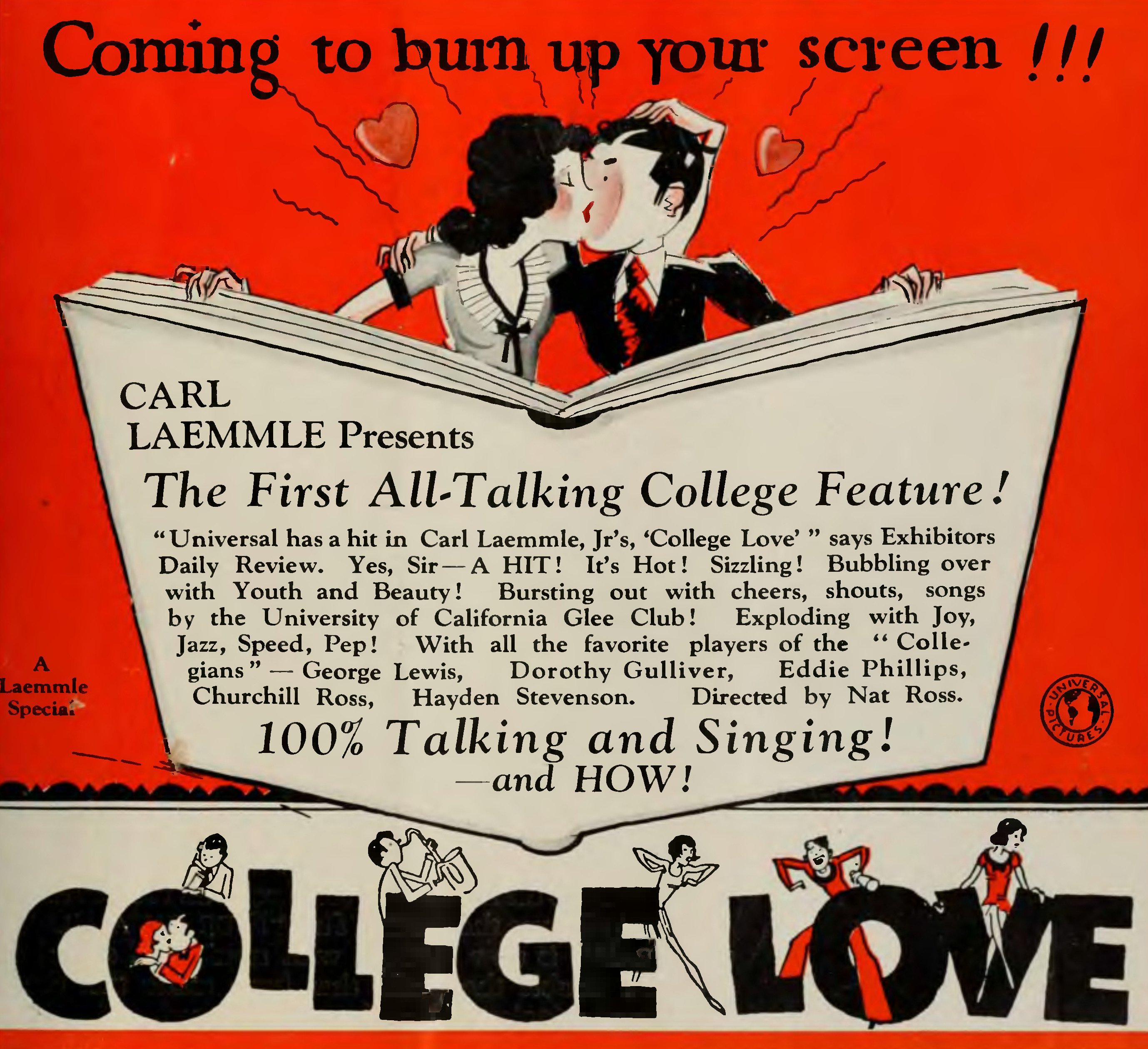
"College Love" ad in The Film Daily, 1929

College Love is a 1929 American musical comedy film directed by Nat Ross and written by John B. Clymer, Pierre Couderc, Leonard Fields, and Albert DeMond. The film stars George J. Lewis, Eddie Phillips, Dorothy Gulliver, Churchill Ross, Hayden Stevenson, and Sumner Getchell. The film was released on July 7, 1929, by Universal Pictures.

== Cast ==
- George J. Lewis as Robert Wilson
- Eddie Phillips as "Flash" Thomas
- Dorothy Gulliver as Dorothy Mae
- Churchill Ross as Jimmy Reed
- Hayden Stevenson as Coach Jones
- Sumner Getchell as "Fat"
- Greta Granstedt (uncredited)
- Robert Livingston (uncredited)
- Helen Mann (uncredited)
- Joy Patterson (uncredited)

== Music ==
The film featured three songs entitled "It's You," "Oh, How We Love Our College," and "Crazy Melody," with words and music by Dave Silverstein and Lee Zahler. "It's You," which was the main theme song for the film, was recorded by Larry Siry and his Hotel Ambassador Orchestra for Columbia Records (Catalog Number 1949-D).

== See also ==
- List of early sound feature films (1926–1929)
