= Wrath (1917 film) =

1917 silent film

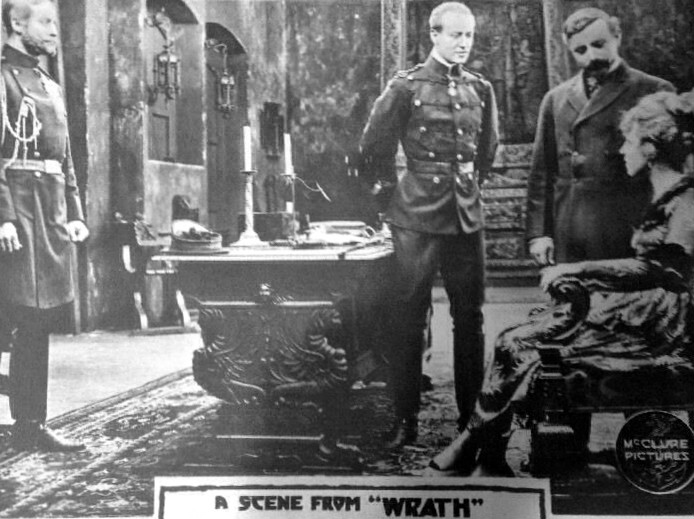
- Lobby card
- Directed by: Theodore Marston
- Starring: H.B. Warner; Edith Hallor; Shirley Mason
- Cinematography: Charles E. Gilson
- Production company: McClure Publishing Company
- Distributed by: Triangle Distributing
- Release date: March 5, 1917
- Running time: 50 minutes
- Country: United States
- Language: Silent (English intertitles)

Wrath is a 1917 American silent drama film directed by Theodore Marston and starring H.B. Warner, Edith Hallor, and Shirley Mason.

== Cast ==
- H.B. Warner as Feodor / The Grand Duke
- Edith Hallor as Evelyn Burnham
- Thea Talbot as Olga Burnham
- Shirley Mason as Eve Leslie
- George LeGuere as Adam Moore
- Charles Wellesley as John Burnham
- George Arvine as Count Nikolai
- John Nicholson as Ashraf Abdallah

== Bibliography ==
- Robert B. Connelly. The Silents: Silent Feature Films, 1910-36, Volume 40, Issue 2. December Press, 1998.
