= Just Outside the Door =

1921 film

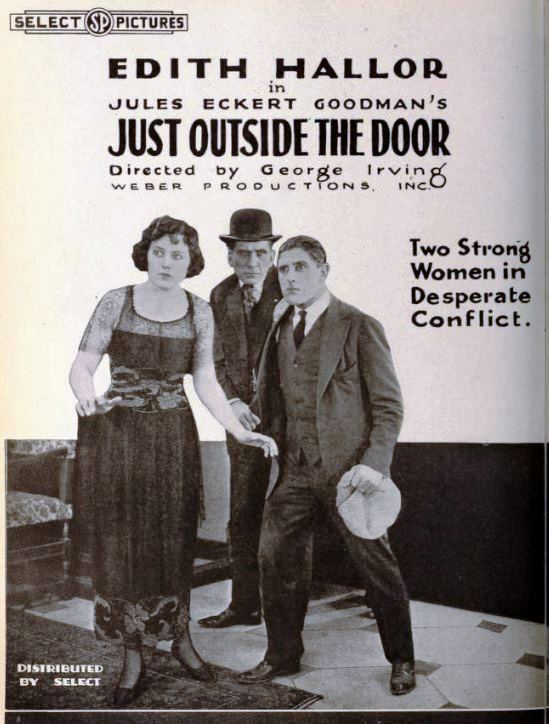
- Directed by: George Irving
- Written by: Harvey F. Thew
- Starring: Edith Hallor; Betty Blythe; J. Barney Sherry
- Production company: Weber Productions
- Distributed by: Select Pictures
- Release date: January 28, 1921
- Running time: 50 minutes
- Country: United States
- Languages: Silent; English intertitles

Just Outside the Door is a 1921 American silent drama film directed by George Irving and starring Edith Hallor, Betty Blythe and J. Barney Sherry.

== Cast ==
- Edith Hallor as Madge Pickton
- Betty Blythe as Floria Wheaton
- J. Barney Sherry as Edward Burleigh
- A. Edward Sutherland as Ned Pickton
- Arnold Gray as Dick Wheaton

== Bibliography ==
- Munden, Kenneth White. The American Film Institute Catalog of Motion Pictures Produced in the United States, Part 1. University of California Press, 1997.
