= Sumner Getchell =

American actor (1906–90)

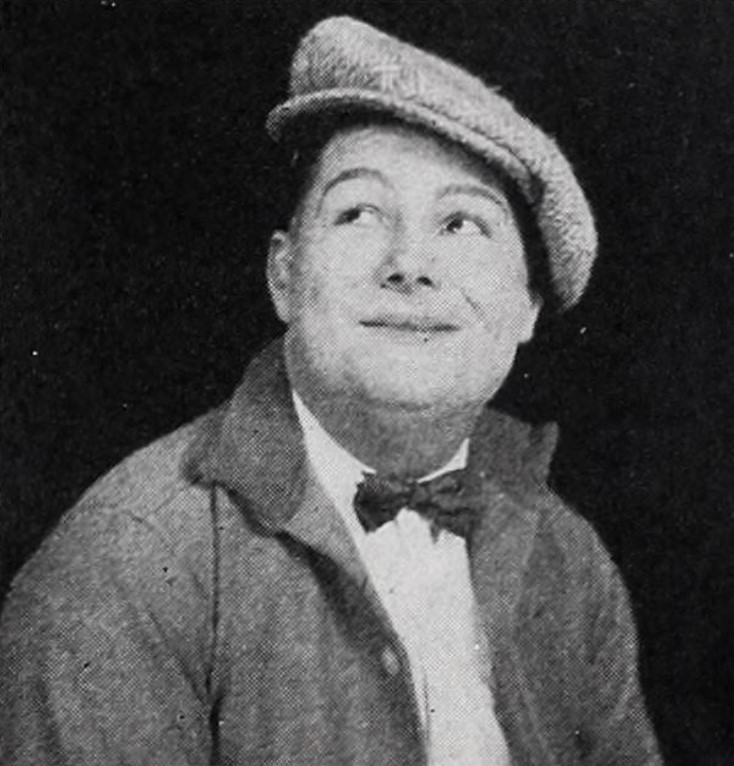
- From a 1925 magazine
- Born: October 20, 1906; Oakland, California, U.S.
- Died: September 21, 1990 (aged 83); Sebastopol, California, U.S.
- Occupation: Actor
- Years active: 1926-1953

Sumner Getchell (October 20, 1906 – September 21, 1990) was an American film actor. He appeared in more than 60 films between 1926 and 1953. He was born in Oakland, California, and died in Sebastopol, California.

His last role was as Lieutenant Cord in The Island in the Sky, a 1953 William A. Wellman film starring John Wayne

== Partial filmography ==
- The College Widow (1927) - Jimmie Hopper
- Pirates of the Pines (1928)
- The Air Circus (1928) - (uncredited)
- The Flying Fleet (1929) - Kewpie (uncredited)
- New Year's Eve (1929) - Edward's Friend
- College Love (1929) - Fat
- Cheer Up and Smile (1930) - Paul
- Maybe It's Love (1930) - Whiskers
- Man to Man (1930) - Jerry (uncredited)
- Don't Bet on Women (1931) - Office Boy (uncredited)
- Daybreak (1931) - Emil
- Pleasure (1931) - Slug - Party Guest (uncredited)
- Crooner (1932) - Teddy's Band Member (uncredited)
- That's My Boy (1932) - Carl
- Vanity Street (1932) - Scottie (uncredited)
- The Son-Daughter (1932) - Dr. Dong's Servant (uncredited)
- Her First Mate (1933) - Wise Guy (uncredited)
- This Side of Heaven (1934) - Gus - Fraternity Member (uncredited)
- The Cat and the Fiddle (1934) - Conservatory Trumpeter (uncredited)
- Coming Out Party (1934) - Tubby, Party Guest (uncredited)
- I Give My Love (1934) - Fat Boy (uncredited)
- Desirable (1934) - Frederick (uncredited)
- Death on the Diamond (1934) - Man on Ticket Line (uncredited)
- Babes in Toyland (1934) - Little Jack Horner (uncredited)
- Clive of India (1935) - Clerk (uncredited)
- The Great Hotel Murder (1935) - Bunny (uncredited)
- Go Into Your Dance (1935) - Young Man in Elevator (uncredited)
- Circus Shadows (1935) - Dale's Friend
- Chinatown Squad (1935) - Fat Boy Tourist (uncredited)
- The Girl Friend (1935) - French Soldier in Play (uncredited)
- Magnificent Obsession (1935) - Jimmy (uncredited)
- The Adventures of Frank Merriwell (1936, Serial) - Harry
- Pick a Star (1937) - Contest Judge (uncredited)
- There Goes the Groom (1937) - Billy Rapp
- Battle of Broadway (1938) - Bakery Boy (uncredited)
- Crime Ring (1938) - Reporter with Black Eye (uncredited)
- My Lucky Star (1938) - Student Messenger
- Campus Confessions (1938) - 'Blimp' Garrett
- These Glamour Girls (1939) - 'Blimpy'
- The Doctor Takes a Wife (1940) - Wedding Celebrant (uncredited)
- The Lady in Question (1940) - Fat Boy
- Remedy for Riches (1940) - First Hotel Clerk (uncredited)
- The Diary of a Chambermaid (1946) - Pierre (uncredited)
- Hop Harrigan (1946) - Tank Tinker
- Bury Me Dead (1947) - Cab Driver (uncredited)
- Big Town After Dark (1947) - Harvey Cushman—Reporter (uncredited)
- My Girl Tisa (1948) - Georgie
- The Crooked Way (1949) - Man with Nina at Bar (uncredited)
- The Fighting Kentuckian (1949) - Knox Brown - Head Fiddler (uncredited)
- No Man of Her Own (1950) - John Larrimore (uncredited)
- Perfect Strangers (1950) - John Simon
- No Sad Songs for Me (1950) - George Spears (uncredited)
- Union Station (1950) - Police Car Driver (uncredited)
- The Fuller Brush Girl (1950) - Magazine Salesman (uncredited)
- Last of the Buccaneers (1950) - Paul DeLorie (uncredited)
- Flame of Stamboul (1951) - Charlie (uncredited)
- Insurance Investigator (1951) - Insurance Agent (uncredited)
- Lightning Strikes Twice (1951) - Rancher (uncredited)
- Chain of Circumstance (1951) - Fred Martindale
- Bannerline (1951) - Eddie (uncredited)
- Island in the Sky (1953) - Lt. Cord
- The Sad Sack (1957) - Fat Soldier (uncredited)
