= Dorothy Tennant (actress) =

American actress

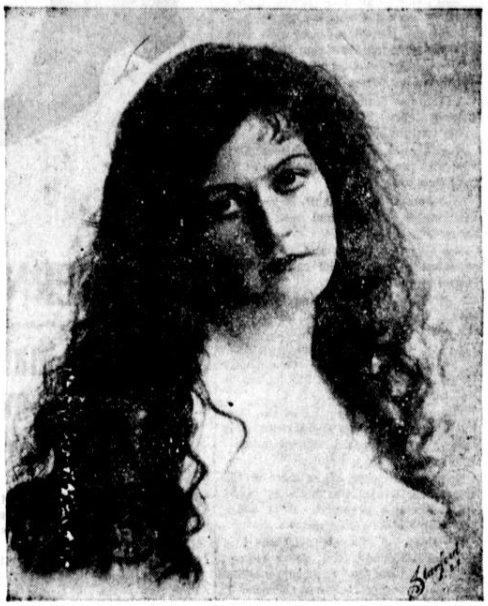
- Tennant circa 1902
- Born: July 10, 1865; California
- Died: July 3, 1942 (aged 76); West Palm Beach, Florida
- Occupation: Actress
- Spouse: Robert M. Catts (m. 1911)
- Parent(s): Richard E. Tennant and Louisa N. Short

Dorothy Tennant (July 10, 1865 - July 3, 1942) was an American stage and screen actress, best known for her stage roles in the first decade of the 20th century, and most prominently her starring role in George Ade's 1904 comedic play The College Widow.

Tennant was born up in San Jose, California and moved to New York around 1900, first appearing on stage in 1901 in the one-act play White Roses. She then obtained a small role in Lover's Lane which opened in Chicago, and was able to jump to a leading role without rehearsal. After that she did a road tour of When We Were Twenty-one where she played Maxine Elliott's role.

Tennant's biggest hit was as the lead role in the 1904 popular play The College Widow, which she performed on Broadway and on tour. Her last prominent stage appearance seems to have been in 1910's Miss Patsy, though she later appeared in some movie roles.

Tennant married Robert M. Catts in December 1911 in a secret wedding. Catts had previously been married and was in disputes with his wife, so the marriage grabbed some press attention when it was first reported on in July 1912.

She died in West Palm Beach, Florida on July 3, 1942, following a long illness. Though Billboard reported her age at death at 77 (born circa 1865), she was more likely born in the 1880s based on her biography.

== Selected performances ==
=== Plays ===
- Soldiers of Fortune (1902)
- Ranson's Folly (1904)
- The College Widow (1904)
- My Wife (1907)
- A Woman's Way (1909)
- Miss Patsy (1910)
