= The College Widow (play) =

1904 play by George Ade

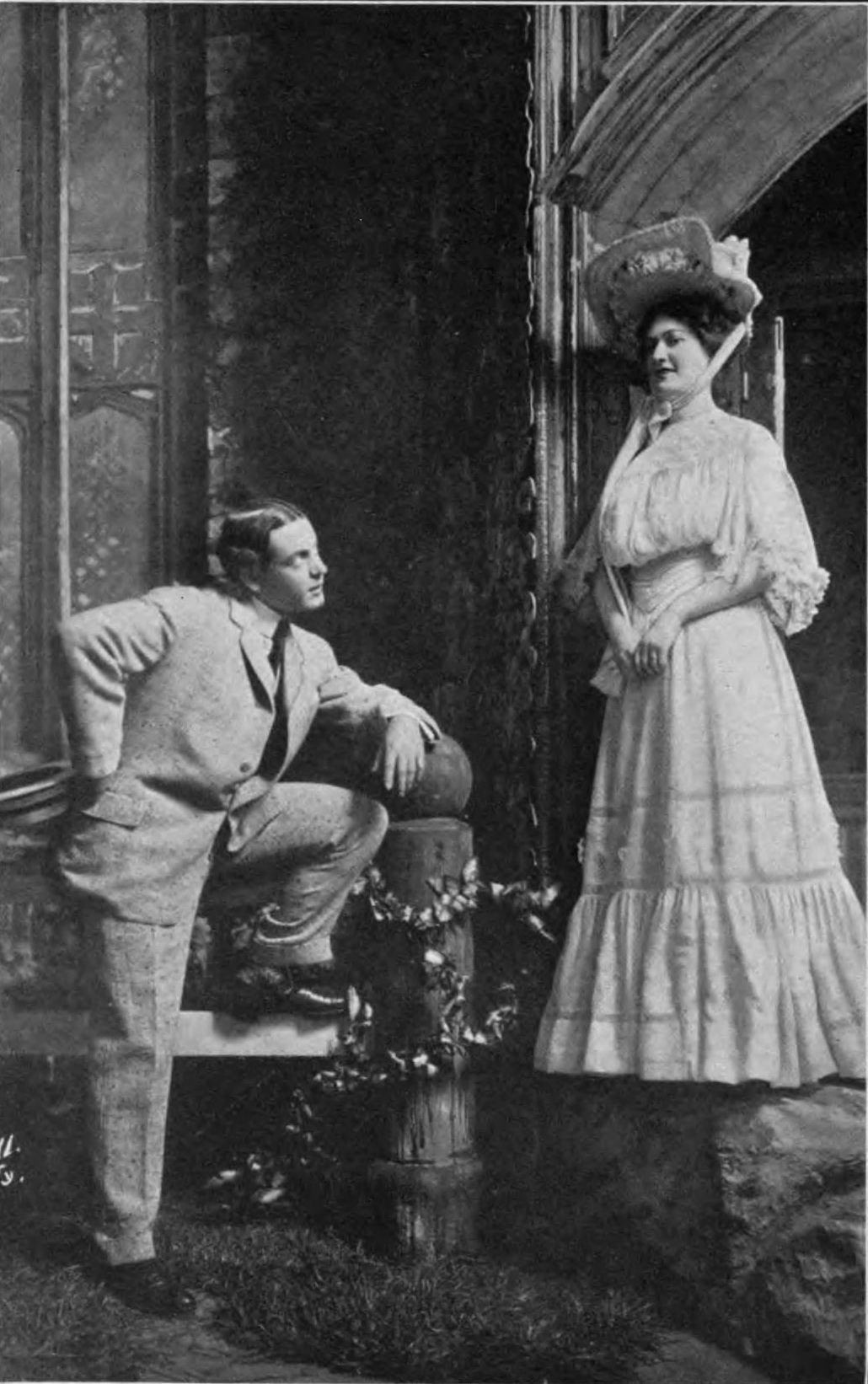
- Frederick Truesdell and Dorothy Tennant in a scene from the play
- Original language: English
- Written by: George Ade
- Genre: Comedy

Premiere
- Date: September 20, 1904
- Place: Garden Theatre

The College Widow is a 1904 American comedic play by George Ade, which was adapted to film multiple times, and also into the popular 1917 musical Leave It to Jane.

== Background ==
In the latter nineteenth and early twentieth centuries, the trope of a "college widow" was spoken of on college campuses, usually meaning an attractive unmarried woman near campus who would date college students, moving on to new students as the years passed. Playwright George Ade first used the trope for a poem he wrote in 1900 (later published in the Saturday Evening Post in 1905), and as the inspiration for a play in 1904.

American football also drives the light plot of the play, loosely based on the football rivalry between DePauw University and Wabash College, which is now known as the Monon Bell rivalry.

== Broadway production ==
After initial warm up performances at the Columbia Theater in Washington, D.C., the play successfully ran at the Garden Theatre on Broadway for 278 performances, from September 20, 1904, through May 13, 1905, and then toured the United States with three different touring companies. The play was produced by Henry Wilson Savage and directed by George Marion. At the end of the run and tour, Ade is said to have earned $2 million from the play.

In 1911, baseball star Ty Cobb starred in a touring production of the play.

== Plot ==
The play is a cheerful and lightweight comedy. Set at fictional Atwater College, Jane Witherspoon (played by Dorothy Tennant) is the daughter of the college president, and she works to prevent star football player Billy Bolton (Frederick Truesdell) from attending rival Bingham College.

== Original Broadway Cast ==
- Frederick Truesdell as Billy Bolton, a half back
- George E. Bryant as Peter Witherspoon, A.M. Ph.D., President of the Atwater College
- Edwin Holt as Hiram Bolton, President of the K. and H. Road
- Dan Collyer as "Matty" McGowen, a trainer
- Stephen Mailey as Hon. Elam Hicks of Squantumville
- Edgar I. Davenport as Jack Larrabee, a football coach
- J. Beresford Hollis as Copernicus Talbot, a post-graduate tutor
- Thomas Delmar as "Silent" Murphy, centre rush
- Morgan Coman as "Stub" Talmadge, a busy undergraduate
- Robert Mackaye at Tom Pearson, right tackle
- E.Y. Backus as The Town Marshall
- Douglas J. Wood as Ollie Mitchell
- George F. Demarest as. Dick McAllister
- John H. Chapman as "Jimsey" Hopper
- Dorothy Tennant as Jane Witherspoon, the college widow
- Amy Ricard as Bessie Tanner, an athletic girl
- Gertrude Quinlan as Flora Wiggins, a prominent waitress
- Lida McMillan as Mrs. Primley Dalzelle, a professional chaperon
- Mary McGregor as Luella Chubbs
- Belle Nelson as Cora Jenks
- Lucy Cabeen as Bertha Tyson
- Georgia Cross as Sally Cameron
- Florence Cameron as Ruth Aiken
- Grace Quackenbush as Josephine Barclay

== Adaptations and legacy ==
The play was adapted to a silent film of the same name in 1915, and again in 1927, and in the sound film Maybe It's Love in 1930 and Freshman Love in 1936. The 1932 Marx Brothers' film Horse Feathers also largely appears to be a parody of the 1927 film.

It was also adapted into a successful musical in 1917 under the title Leave It to Jane.
