= George Irving (American actor) =

American actor (1874–1961)

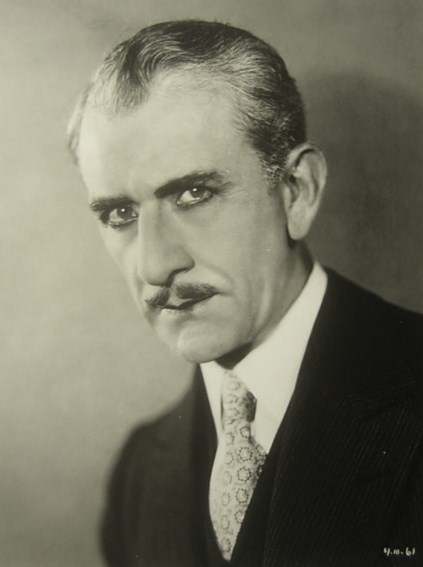
- Irving in Craig's Wife (1928)
- Born: George Henry Irving; October 5, 1874; New York City, New York, U.S.
- Died: September 11, 1961 (aged 86); Hollywood, California, U.S.
- Occupation: Actor
- Years active: 1914–1954
- Spouse: Katherine Gilman
- Children: 2

George Henry Irving (October 5, 1874 – September 11, 1961) was an American film actor and director.

== Career ==
Irving started his career as a theatre actor, notably as leading man to Maude Adams. He came to Hollywood in 1914 and acted in over 250 films from 1914 until 1948. Irving was initially an actor-director and directed about 35 silent films, which are mostly forgotten today. He switched exclusively to acting in the mid-1920s and became a character actor until the later 1940s.

Irving usually played reputable and stern persons of authority in supporting roles. He is perhaps best known for his roles as Robert Wentworth in Coquette (1929), and as the lawyer Alexander Peabody in Bringing Up Baby (1938). He ended his prolific career with two television roles in the 1950s.

== Personal life ==
George Irving and his wife, Katherine Gilman, had two daughters, Katharine and Dorothy. He died from a heart attack in Hollywood in 1961, aged 86.

== Selected filmography ==
=== Actor ===
- Paid in Full (1914) as Jimsey Smith (film debut)
- The Jungle (1914) as Minor Role
- The Education of Mr. Pipp (1914) as John Willing
- Body and Soul (1915) as The Rider
- Jaffery (1916) as Minor Role
- North of 36 (1924) as Eric Porter (journalist)
- Wanderer of the Wasteland (1924) as Mr. Roderick Virey
- The Man Who Fights Alone (1924) as Dr. Raymond
- Madonna of the Streets (1924) (uncredited)
- North of 36 (1924) as Pattison
- Her Market Value (1925) as Harvey Dumont
- The Goose Hangs High (1925) as Bernard Ingals
- The Air Mail (1925) as Peter Rendon
- Wild Horse Mesa (1925) as Lige Melberne
- The Golden Princess (1925) as Bill Ket
- The Primrose Path (1925) as Prosecutor John Morton (uncredited)
- His Jazz Bride (1926)
- The King of the Turf (1926) as Colonel Fairfax
- Desert Gold (1926) as Richard Stanton Gale
- The Midnight Kiss (1926) as Thomas H. Hastings, Sr.
- 3 Bad Men (1926) as Gen. Neville (uncredited)
- Risky Business (1926) as Schubal Peabody
- The Ice Flood (1926) as Thomas De Quincy
- The City (1926) as George Rand Sr
- Fangs of Justice (1926)
- Wings (1927) as Mr. Powell (uncredited)
- The Godless Girl (1928)
- The Docks of New York (1928)
- Modern Mothers (1928)
- Coquette (1929)
- Dance Hall (1929)
- Paris Bound (1929)
- Thunderbolt (1929)
- Young Eagles (1930)
- The Divorcee (1930)
- Maybe It's Love (1930)
- The Poor Millionaire (1930)
- Dishonored (1931)
- A Free Soul (1931) as Johnson, Defense Attorney (uncredited)
- An American Tragedy (1931)
- The Last Flight (1931)
- The Unholy Garden (1931)
- The Cisco Kid (1931)
- Broken Lullaby (1932)
- Merrily We Go to Hell (1932)
- Air Mail (1932)
- Guilty or Not Guilty (1932)
- Rasputin and the Empress (1932)
- Island of Lost Souls (1932)
- 42nd Street (1933)
- Employees' Entrance (1933)
- What! No Beer? (1933)
- Christopher Bean (1933)
- Heroes for Sale (1933)
- Night Flight (1933)
- Mr. Skitch (1933)
- David Harum (1934)
- Viva Villa! (1934)
- Once to Every Bachelor (1934)
- Manhattan Melodrama (1934)
- The World Moves On (1934)
- You're Telling Me! (1934)
- Bright Eyes (1934)
- Under the Pampas Moon (1935)
- Charlie Chan in Egypt (1935)
- Times Square Lady (1935)
- Dante's Inferno (1935)
- Dangerous (1935)
- A Night at the Opera (1935) as Committeeman (uncredited)
- Hearts Divided (1936) as Thomas Jefferson
- A Message to Garcia (1936)
- Sutter's Gold (1936)
- Captain January (1936)
- Private Number (1936)
- Hearts in Bondage (1936)
- Charlie Chan at the Race Track (1936)
- Give Me Liberty (1936, Short)
- Too Many Wives (1937)
- The Toast of New York (1937)
- Breakfast for Two (1937)
- High Flyers (1937)
- Bringing Up Baby (1938)
- The Saint in New York (1938)
- Mother Carey's Chickens (1938)
- The Story of Vernon and Irene Castle (1939)
- Sergeant Madden (1939)
- The Hardys Ride High (1939)
- Hell's Kitchen (1939)
- Dust Be My Destiny (1939)
- Espionage Agent (1939)
- Bad Little Angel (1939)
- Laddie (1940)
- Abe Lincoln in Illinois (1940) as Robert E. Lee (uncredited)
- Calling Philo Vance (1940)
- Johnny Apollo (1940)
- An Angel from Texas (1940)
- Florian (1940)
- New Moon (1940)
- Knute Rockne All American (1940)
- Little Men (1940)
- She Couldn't Say No (1940)
- Golden Hoofs (1941)
- The Great Mr. Nobody (1941)
- Love Crazy (1941)
- Sergeant York (1941) as Harrison (uncredited)
- Bullets for O'Hara (1941)
- The Vanishing Virginian (1942)
- The Great Man's Lady (1942)
- Once Upon a Honeymoon (1942)
- Hangmen Also Die! (1943) as Necval
- Dr. Gillespie's Criminal Case (1943)
- Son of Dracula (1943)
- Lady in the Death House (1944)
- Christmas Holiday (1944)
- Raiders of Ghost City (1944, Serial)
- Bluebeard (1944)
- Magic Town (1947)
- Mickey (1948) (final film)

=== Director ===
- The Fairy and the Waif (1915)
- The Woman in 47 (1916)
- The Ballet Girl (1916)
- The Conquest of Canaan (1916)
- Then I'll Come Back to You (1916)
- Raffles, the Amateur Cracksman (1917)
- Daughter of Destiny (1917)
- God's Man (1917)
- The Landloper (1918)
- Back to the Woods (1918)
- To Hell with the Kaiser! (1918)
- Hidden Fires (1918)
- The Glorious Lady (1919)
- As a Man Thinks (1919)
- The Capitol (1919)
- The Blue Pearl (1920)
- The Misleading Lady (1920)
- The Wakefield Case (1921)
- Just Outside the Door (1921)
- Her Majesty (1922)
- Lost in a Big City (1923)
- Floodgates (1924)
