= The College Widow (1927 film) =

1927 film

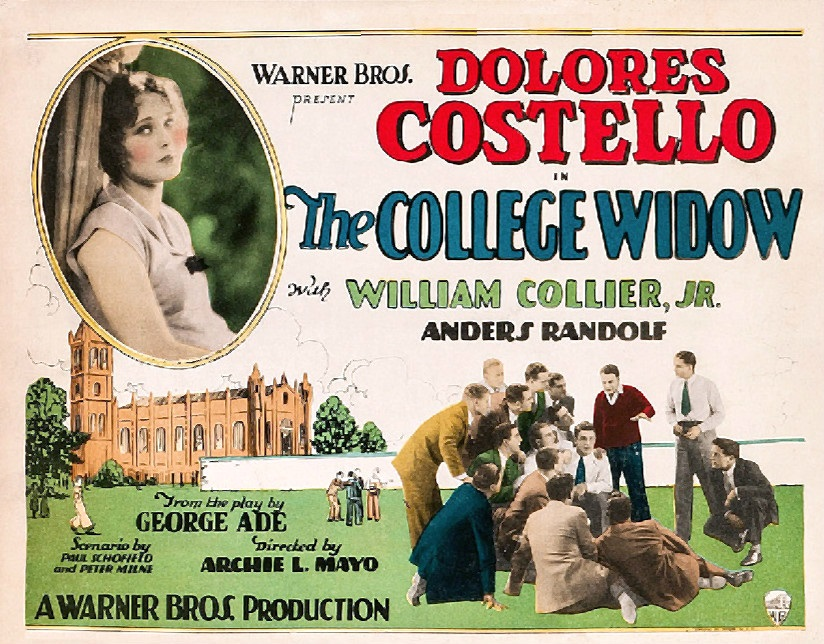
- Lobby card
- Directed by: Archie Mayo
- Written by: Peter Milne (adaptation); Jack Jarmuth (titles)
- Screenplay by: Paul Schofield
- Based on: The College Widow; 1904 play by George Ade
- Starring: Dolores Costello
- Cinematography: Barney McGill
- Edited by: Clarence Kolster
- Production company: Warner Bros.
- Distributed by: Warner Bros.
- Release date: October 15, 1927
- Running time: 67 minutes
- Country: United States
- Languages: Silent (English intertitles); Vitaphone soundtrack
- Budget: $104,000
- Box office: $343,000

The College Widow is a 1927 American silent comedy film produced and distributed by Warner Bros. and directed by Archie Mayo.

== History ==
The film is based on the 1904 Broadway play of the same name by George Ade and was previously adapted to film in 1915 with Ethel Clayton. The 1927 silent film version is a starring vehicle for Dolores Costello.

The story was also filmed in 1930 as an early talkie, Maybe It's Love, starring Joan Bennett and in 1936 as Freshman Love with Patricia Ellis.

== Cast ==
- Dolores Costello as Jane Witherspoon
- William Collier Jr. as Billy Bolton
- Douglas Gerrard as Professor Jelicoe
- Anders Randolf as Hiram Bolton
- Charles Hills Mailes as Professor Witherspoon
- Robert Ryan as Jack Larrbee
- Sumner Getchell as Jimmie Hopper
- Guinn 'Big Boy' Williams as Don White
- Grace Gordon as Flora

== Box Office ==
According to Warner Bros. records, the film earned $268,000 domestically and $75,000 foreign.

== Preservation ==
This motion picture is now considered to be a lost film.

== See also ==
- List of American football films
- List of lost films
- List of early Warner Bros. sound and talking features
