= The Beauty Prize (film) =

1924 film

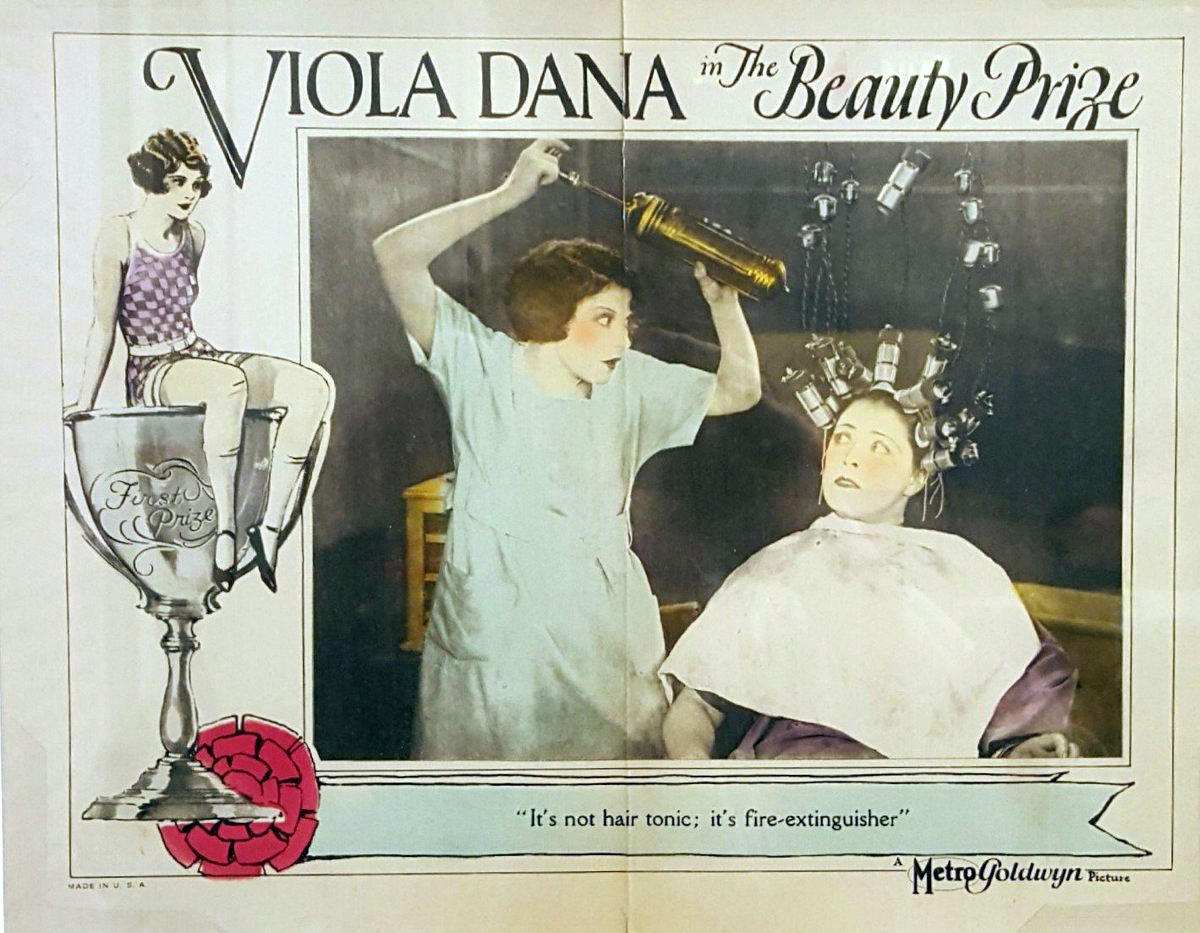
- Lobby card.
- Directed by: Lloyd Ingraham
- Written by: Winifred Dunn
- Story by: Nina Wilcox Putnam
- Starring: Viola Dana; Pat O'Malley; Eddie Phillips
- Cinematography: John Arnold
- Distributed by: Metro-Goldwyn-Mayer
- Release date: May 14, 1924
- Running time: 6 reels (approximately 60 minutes)
- Country: United States
- Language: Silent (English intertitles)

The Beauty Prize is a 1924 American silent comedy film directed by Lloyd Ingraham and starring Viola Dana. The film was partly shot on location at the KFI radio station in Los Angeles, CA.

== Synopsis ==
A manicurist wins a beauty contest while posing as a debutante, and reveals her deception via a new craze, the radio.

== Cast ==
- Viola Dana as Connie Du Bois
- Pat O'Malley as George Brady
- Eddie Phillips as Eddie Schwartz
- Eunice Murdock Moore as Madame Estelle (credited as Eunice Vin Moore)
- Edward Connelly as Pa Du Bois
- Edith Yorke as Ma Du Bois
- Joan Standing as Lydia Du Bois
- Frederick Truesdell as Eric Brandon

== Preservation ==
The Beauty Prize is currently presumed lost. In February of 2021, the film was cited by the National Film Preservation Board on their Lost U.S. Silent Feature Films list.
