= George Truesdell =

American businessman (1842–1921)

George Truesdell (1842–1921) was an American businessman and decorated Civil War veteran who developed several suburbs and two of the earliest streetcar companies of Washington, D.C.

== Biography ==
Born in Fairmount, New York, in 1842, Truesdell studied civil engineering at the University of Michigan.

When the American Civil War broke out in 1861, Truesdell enlisted in the Union Army's 12th New York Volunteers as a private; the following year, he received a commission to lieutenant and a promotion to captain. He was wounded and captured during the 1862 Battle of Gaines' Mill. After the war, he was promoted to major in the Regular Army and assigned as a paymaster. He was brevetted lieutenant colonel for meritorious service, and left the Army in 1869.

Truesdell worked as a civil engineer in New Jersey for two years. In 1872, he moved to Washington, D.C. Between 1894 and 1897, Truesdell served on the DC Board of Commissioners.

== Developer ==
In the 1880s, Truesdell bought 15 acres of land in Kalorama Triangle, where he sold land and built apartment buildings. "Perhaps no one person had as much influence on the development of Kalorama Triangle as did George Truesdell", wrote local historian Stephen Hansen.

In 1887, Truesdell and his wife Frances Pringle bought an 87-acre tract in the District: the estate of Joseph Gales Jr., owner of the National Intelligencer and mayor of Washington from 1827 to 1830. Gales had named his estate Eckington after the village in Derbyshire, England in which he was born, and Truesdell kept the name as he proceeded to subdivide the land and build houses for a new neighborhood. In three years, Truesdell spent $500,000 improving the subdivision: he laid water and sewer pipes, paved streets, and erected a standpipe near the old Gales house. Truesdell erected five "pretty cottages" which, according to an 1888 newspaper account, were "all fitted up as city houses," with steam heat and hot and cold running water. Eckington was wired for electricity in 1889, two years before electricity was installed in the White House. Truesdell placed restrictive covenants in the deeds of Eckington's residential properties that required that each house cost at least $2,000 and be set back 15 feet (4.6 m) from the building line. There was to be no manufacturing. As late as 1930, there were no African American families living in Eckington.

== Streetcar executive ==
In 1888, Truesdell launched the Eckington and Soldiers' Home Railway, the city's first electric railway.

He later helped found the Rock Creek Railway.

He was an officer of the Washington and Great Falls Electric Railway Company when it was swept into the Washington Traction and Electric Company on June 5, 1899, part of the "great streetcar consolidation".
