= Maybe It's Love (1930 film) =

1930 film

- Lantern slide
- Directed by: William A. Wellman
- Screenplay by: Joseph Jackson (& dialogue)
- Story by: Mark Canfield; Darryl F. Zanuck
- Based on: The College Widow; 1904 play by George Ade (uncredited)
- Starring: Joan Bennett; Joe E. Brown; James Hall
- Cinematography: Robert Kurrle
- Edited by: Edward M. McDermott
- Music by: Erno Rapee; Louis Silvers
- Production company: Warner Bros. Pictures
- Distributed by: Warner Bros. Pictures
- Release date: October 4, 1930
- Running time: 74 minutes
- Country: United States
- Language: English

Maybe It's Love is a 1930 pre-Code American musical comedy film produced and distributed by Warner Bros. Pictures and directed by William A. Wellman. The movie stars Joan Bennett, Joe E. Brown and James Hall. The film is based on George Ade's 1904 play The College Widow and is a remake of Warner's own 1927 silent version of the story, which starred Dolores Costello. The play had also been filmed in 1915, starring Ethel Clayton.

The film was retitled Eleven Men and a Girl when it began airing on American television in the 1950s, perhaps to avoid confusion with the 1935 film also titled Maybe It's Love.

== Plot ==
Upton College President Sheffield is in serious danger of losing his job. For the last twelve years Upton has lost the annual football match against rival Parsons College. The trustees of Upton insist that Sheffield must resign if Upton fails to win the upcoming football match.

Sheffield's daughter Nan overhears the threat of the trustees and tells her friend Yates, a star football player. Together they come up with a scheme to get some of the best football players around to sign up to play for Upton. Nan completely changes her appearance to vamp the various men into thinking she will be interested in them if they attend Upton in the following season and play for the football team.

One by one they all fall for the scheme and sign up for Upton. Sheffield, however, refuses to admit Tommy Nelson into the college because of his poor performance in academics. Because of the coach's insistence on needing him to win the game, Nan helps Tommy sign up under a fictitious name and credentials. All is well until Tommy finds out about Nan's scheme and tells the rest of the team. Just before the game, the Upton team pretends to be drunk in order to teach Nan a lesson. Just as the game is about to begin, the team decides to forgive Nan and they win the game for Upton.

== Cast ==
- Joan Bennett as Nan Sheffield
- Joe E. Brown as Yates
- James Hall as Tommy Nelson
- Laura Lee as Betty
- Sumner Getchell as "Whiskers"
- George Irving as President Sheffield

All-American Football Team

- Bill Banker
- George Gibson
- Howard Harpster
- Kenneth Haycraft
- Ray Montgomery
- Tim Moynihan
- Otto Pommerening
- Russ Saunders
- Wear Schoonover
- Paul Scull
- Red Sleight
- Howard Jones as The Coach

== Songs ==
- "Maybe It's Love"
- "I Love to Do It" (cut from domestic release prints)
- "The All American"
- "Keep It Up for Upton"

== Production ==
Originally planned as a full-scale musical, much of the music was removed before release because of the public's apathy and aversion towards musicals in the autumn of 1930. A longer musical version may have been released in countries outside the United States where a backlash against musicals never occurred. It is unknown whether a copy of this fuller version still exists.

== Preservation status ==
The film is preserved in the Library of Congress and occasionally is broadcast on Turner Classic Movies.

== Home media ==
The domestic version of the film has been released by the Warner Archive on DVD.

== See also ==
- List of American football films
