= The College Widow (1915 film) =

1915 film by Barry O'Neil

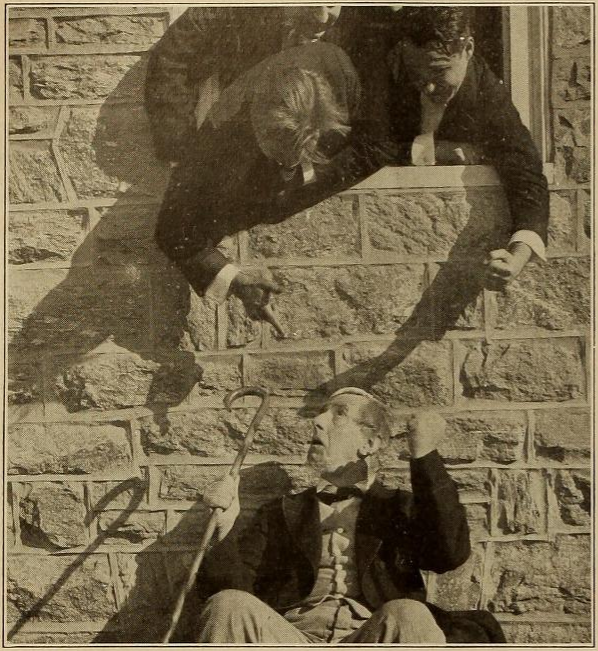
- Scene from film
- Directed by: Barry O'Neil
- Written by: scenario Clay M. Greene
- Based on: The College Widow; 1904 play by George Ade
- Produced by: Sigmund Lubin
- Starring: Ethel Clayton
- Cinematography: Fred Chaston
- Production company: Lubin Manufacturing Company
- Distributed by: V-L-S-E
- Release date: May 10, 1915
- Running time: 6 reels
- Country: United States
- Language: Silent (English intertitles)

The College Widow is a 1915 silent comedy drama film starring Ethel Clayton. It's the first filming of George Ade's 1904 campus comedy play of the same name performed on Broadway that year. The film was made by the Lubin Manufacturing Company in Pennsylvania and is now lost.

Later film adaptations of this story are The College Widow (1927), Maybe It's Love (1930), and Freshman Love (1936).

== Cast ==
- Ethel Clayton – Jane Witherspoon
- George Soule Spencer – Billy Bolton
- Charles Brandt – Dr. Witherspoon
- Edith Ritchie – Mrs. Dalzelle
- Ferdinand Tidmarsh – Jack Larrabee
- Howard Missimer – Matty McGowan
- Clarence Elmer – Stub Talmadge
- Peter Lang – Hiram Bolton
- George Clarke – Silent Murphy
- Joseph Kaufman – Tom Pierson
- Bartley McCullum – Hiram Hicks
- Arthur Matthews – Bud Hicks
- Richard Wangermann – Dan Tibbetts (as Richard Wangemann)
- Percy Winter – Copernicus Talbott
- Ruth Bryan – Bessie Tanner
- Betty Brice – Flora Wiggins (as Rosetta Brice)
- Florence Williams – Mrs. Wiggins

== Production ==
During the filming of The College Widow, actor Clarence Elmer met and married Edyth Stroud Anderton, and the wedding was held at the Philadelphia Lubin Studio on February 13th.

== Reception ==
Motion Picture News reviewer Irene Page Soloman gave the film a positive review, finding that the acting was not only good from the leads "In fact, the long cast are all good even the minor characters being in capable hands."
