= Edith Hallor =

American silent film actress

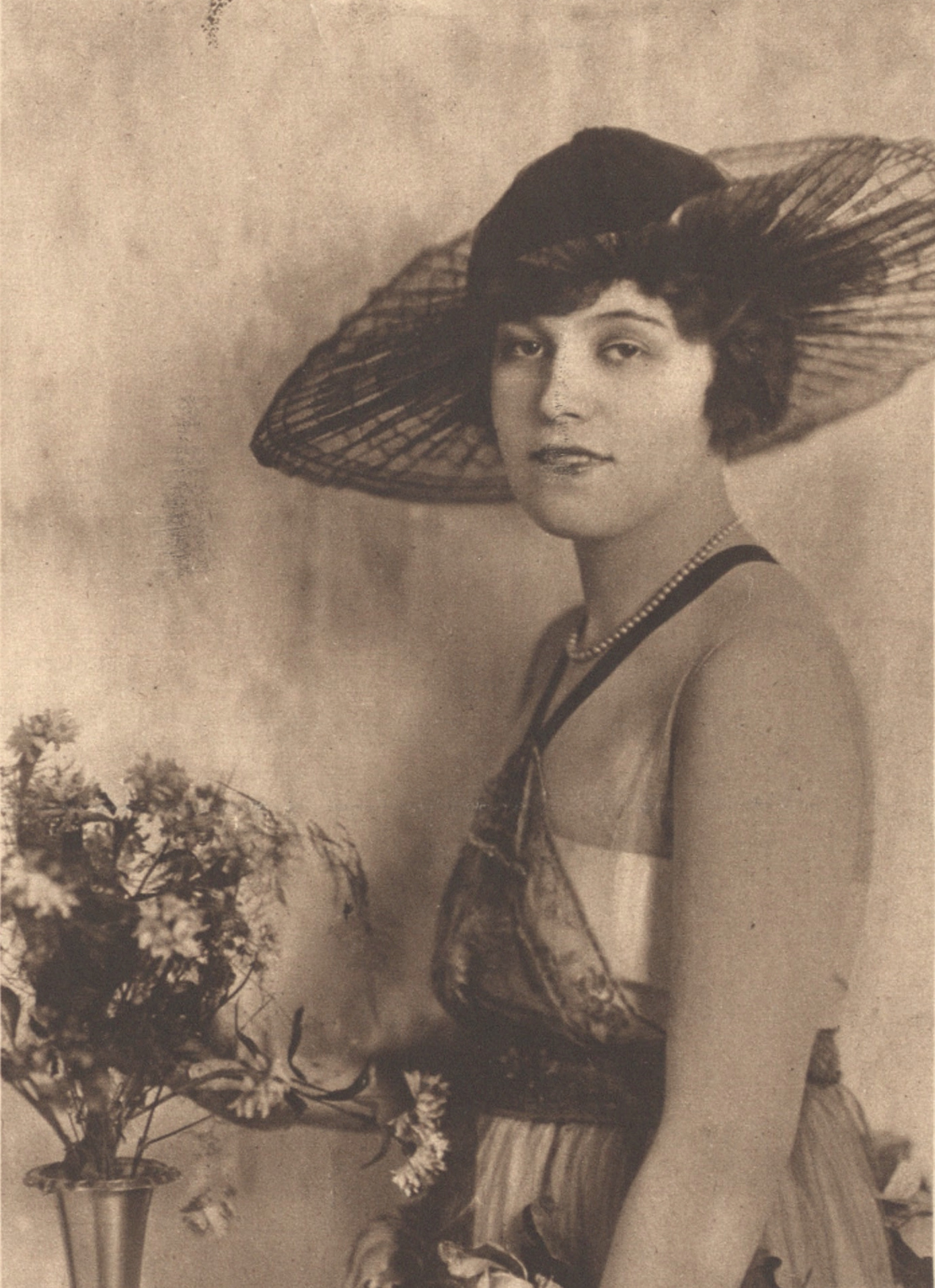
- Hallor in Leave It to Jane
- Born: March 26, 1896; Washington, D.C., U.S.
- Died: May 21, 1971 (aged 75); Newport Beach, California, U.S.
- Occupation: Actress
- Years active: 1914–1945 (film)
- Spouses: L. Lawrence Weber; John Francis Dillon
- Relatives: Ray Hallor (brother)

Edith Hallor, also known as Edith Kingdon Hallor, (March 26, 1896 – May 21, 1971) was an American stage and film actress. She starred in several Broadway musicals from 1915 through 1920. She appeared in a number of films during the silent era from 1914 through 1922. She later appeared in a handful of minor film roles during the sound era from 1937 through 1945.

== Life and career ==
Edith Kingdon Hallor was born on March 26, 1896 in Washington, D.C. She was the sister of actors Ray Hallor and Ethel Hallor. She began her career as a member of the Columbia Players, a repertory theatre troupe in residence at the Columbia Theatre in Washington, D.C. Her repertoire with this organization included the role of Lady Stapleton in Capt. R. Marshall's A Royal Family (1913). In 1914 she performed with Emma Trentini's company at the Shubert-Teck Theatre in Buffalo, New York and the Alvin Theatre in Pittsburgh. She simultaneously worked as a silent film actress. Her early films included The Governor's Ghost (1914), Through Dante's Flames (1914), The Criminal Path (1914), Thou Shalt Not (1914), The War of Wars; or, the Franco-German Invasion (1914), Dr. Rameau (1915), The Family Stain (1915), Black Friday (1916), A Man and the Woman (1917), and Wrath (1917).

Hallor portrayed Countess Napolska in Oskar Nedbal's The Peasant Girl on Broadway at the 44th Street Theatre in 1915. She starred alongside Fanny Brice and Eddie Cantor in the Ziegfeld Follies of 1917 in which she sang the songs "In the Beautiful Garden of Girls" and "Hello, My Dearie". She starred in two more Broadway musicals in 1917; portraying Jane Witherspoon in Jerome Kern's Leave It to Jane at the Longacre Theatre and as a featured performer in another Ziegfeld revue, Dance and Grow Thin, at the Cocoanut Grove Theatre.

In 1920 Hallor returned to Broadway to perform in the revue Broadway Brevities of 1920 at the Winter Garden Theatre; a show which featured her singing Irving Berlin's "Beautiful Faces". She continued to work as a film actress in the early 1920s with roles in Children of Destiny (1920), The Blue Pearl (1920), The Inside of the Cup (1921), Just Outside the Door (1921), and Human Hearts (1922). She later had minor roles in sound films; including appearances in Maid of Salem (1937), Just Off Broadway (1942), Wilson (1944), Having Wonderful Crime (1945), and A Tree Grows in Brooklyn (1945).

Hallor was married to L. Lawrence Weber, and they had a son, Lawrence Weber Jr. They were divorced on June 18, 1920, on grounds that she had been unfaithful with Jack Dillon. In 1934 she married film director John Francis Dillon.

Hallor died from cancer in Newport Beach, California on May 21, 1971.
