= Xwejni Redoubt =

Coastal fortification in Malta, completed in 1716

- Ridott tax-Xwejni
- Żebbuġ, Gozo, Malta

Site information
- Type: Redoubt

Site history
- Built: 1715–1716
- Built by: Order of Saint John
- Materials: Limestone
- Fate: Demolished

Xwejni Redoubt (Maltese: Ridott tax-Xwejni) was a redoubt in Xwejni Bay, limits of Żebbuġ, Gozo, Malta. It was built by the Order of Saint John in 1715 and 1716 as one of a series of coastal fortifications around the coasts of the Maltese Islands.

The redoubt formed part of a chain of fortifications built to defend Marsalforn and nearby bays from Ottoman or Barbary attacks. Although the area was once fortified by a number of towers, batteries, redoubts and entrenchments, all of these have been destroyed except for Qolla l-Bajda Battery between Qbajjar and Xwejni Bays.

Xwejni Redoubt was unusual in the sense that it had a semicircular or rectangular platform, while most redoubts were pentagonal.

No remains of the redoubt have survived.
