= Rookery (disambiguation) =

A rookery is a colony of breeding birds and some marine mammals.

Rookery may also refer to:

== Buildings and places ==
- Rookery (slum), a city area occupied by poor people, criminals and prostitutes
- Rookery Building, in Chicago, U.S.
- Rookery Hall, in Cheshire, England
- Rookery Hill, a football stadium in Thurrock, Essex, England
- Rookery House, in Erdington, Birmingham, England
- Rookery Islands, in Antarctica
- Rookery Lake, in Antarctica
- Rookery Mound, an archaeological site near Everglades City, Florida, U.S.
- Rookery railway station, a former railway station in Rainford, Lancashire, England
- The Rookery, Aspley Guise, a BBC WW2 black propaganda site used by Otto John
- The Rookery, Nantwich, a Georgian townhouse in England
- The Rookery, Staffordshire, a place in Staffordshire, England
- The Rookery, Tattenhall, a house in Cheshire, England
- The Rookery, the home end at Vicarage Road stadium, Watford, England
- The Rookery, a park in the London Borough of Lambeth, England

== Other uses ==
- Rookery, a 2020 album by Giant Rooks

== See also ==
- Rockery (disambiguation)
- Rook (disambiguation)
- Rookery Nook (disambiguation)
- Rookie (disambiguation)
