= Qbajjar =

Bay on the island of Gozo, Malta

Qbajjar Bay
- Il-Qbajjar
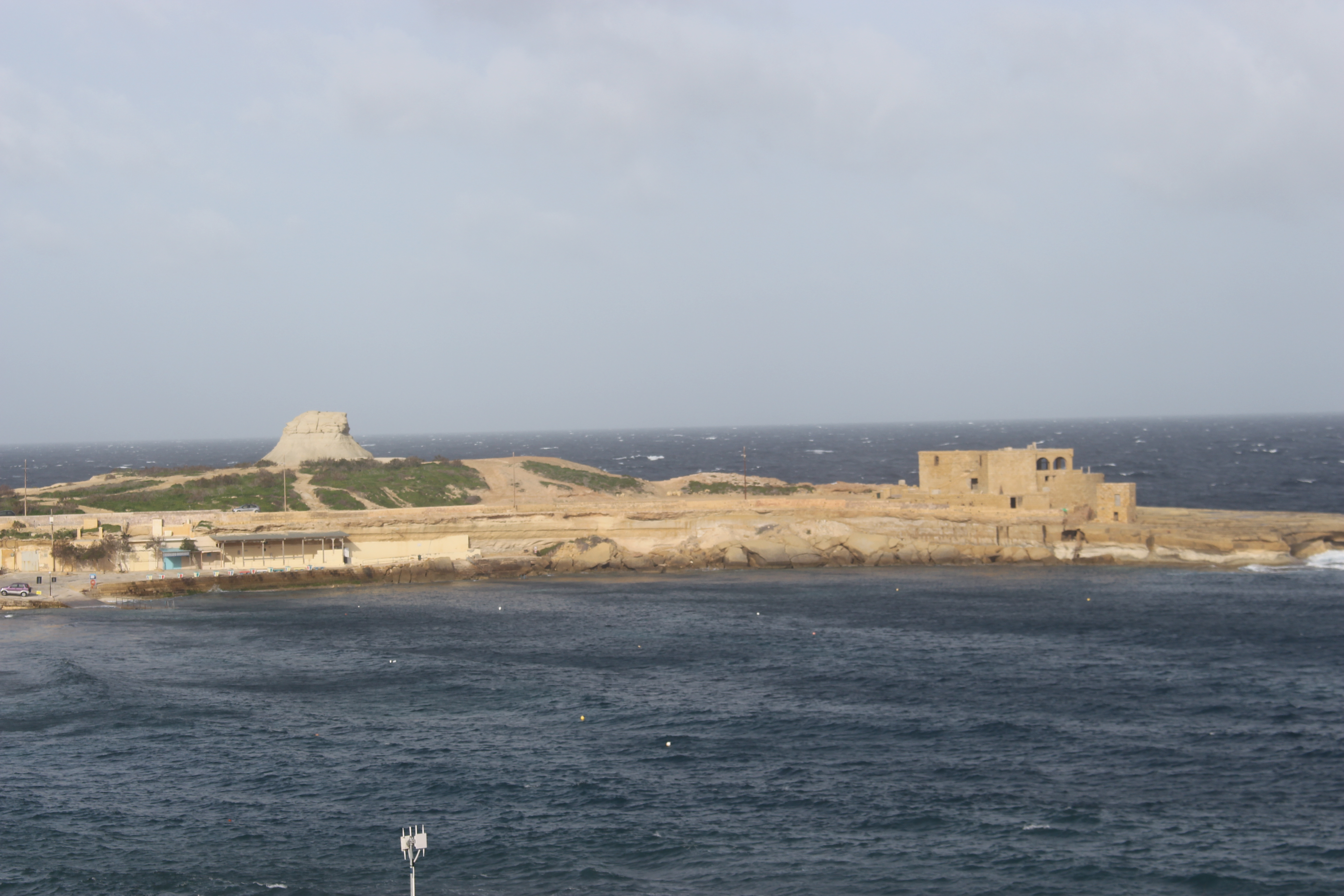
- Qolla Il-Bajda with the Qolla Il-Bajda Battery to the right

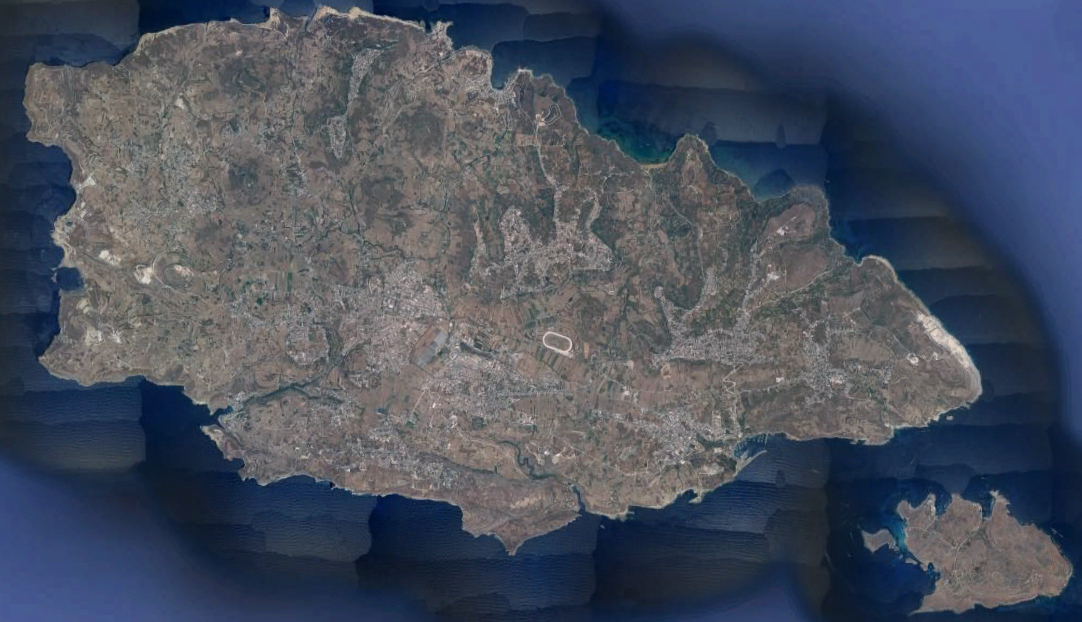
- Location within Gozo Location within Malta
- Location: Marsalforn, Gozo, Malta
- Coordinates: 36°04′38″N 14°15′10″E
- Part of: Mediterranean Sea
- Max. length: 370 metres (1,210 ft)
- Max. width: 330 metres (1,080 ft)
- Surface area: 4.3 hectares (0.043 km^{2})
- Surface elevation: 26 feet (7.9 m)

Qbajjar Bay (Maltese: Il-Qbajjar) is a small bay near Marsalforn, in the limits of Żebbuġ on the island of Gozo, Malta. This small bay is part of Marsalforn. It is located between Xwejni Bay to the west, and Marsalforn Bay to the east. The 18th century Qolla l-Bajda Battery, one of the few surviving coastal fortifications in Gozo, is located between Qbajjar and Xwejni, on a promontory known as il-Ponta tat-Torri. The bay, also has a few salt pans, where locals collect salt.

== History ==
=== The Qolla Il-Bajda Battery ===
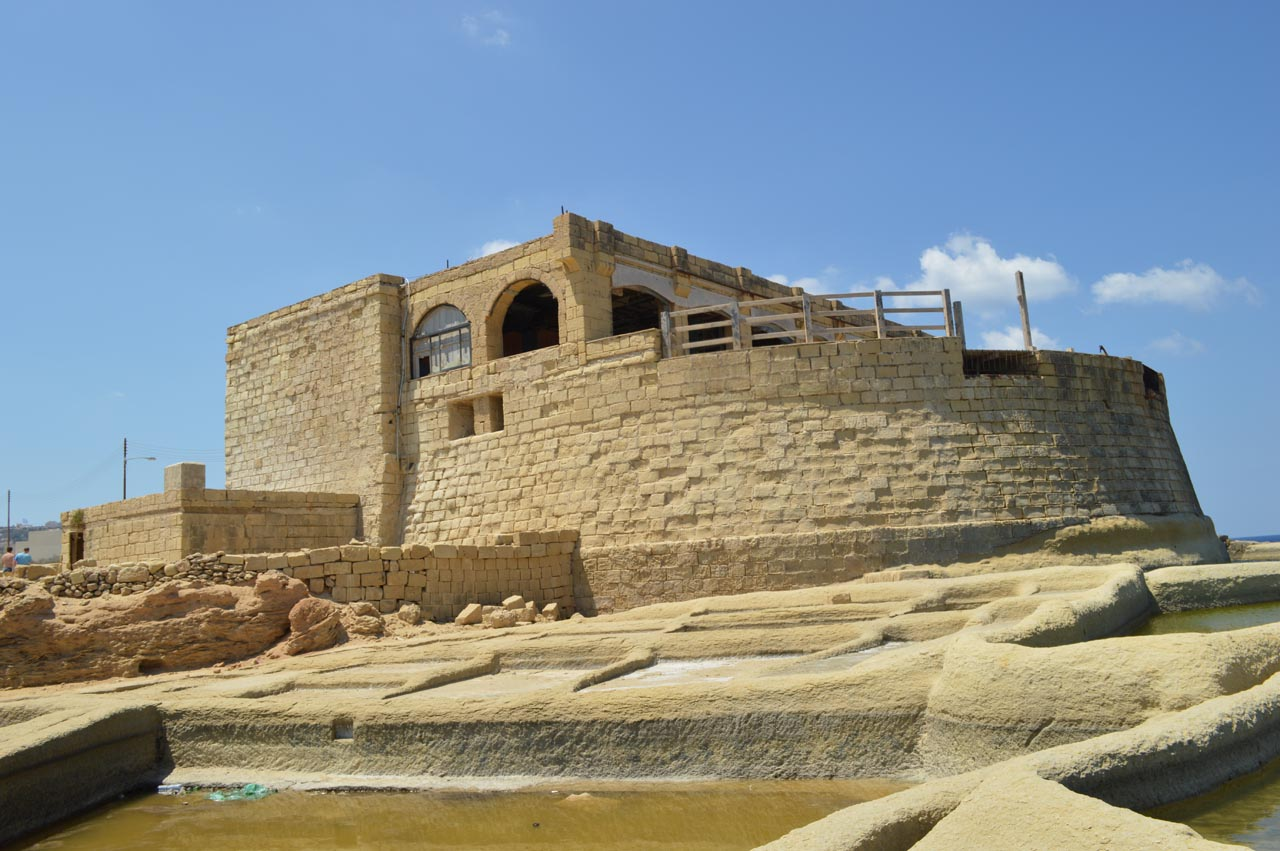
Qolla l-Bajda Battery

The Qolla l-Bajda Battery, also known as the Qbajjar Battery, is one of the many defensive structures built in the Hospitaller period, and continued to be used by Britain in World War I and World War II. When it was originally built, it was made up of two blockhouses, a gun platform, a parapet and a small ditch.

These enabled it to provide defense against invading forces. The blockhouses had small gun-holes, in case of an attack from land. Now, this historic monument lies abandoned.

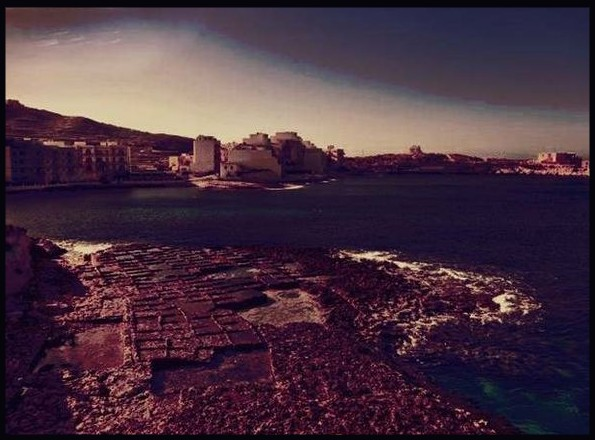
Qbajjar skyline

=== The "Qolliet" ===
The two Hillocks are one of the most visible geographical features in Marsalforn. One being in the yellowish color and the other in whitish. These translate to qolla is-safra (the yellow hillock) and the qolla il-bajda (the white hillock). The battery's name comes from the white hillock as they are within 800 metres (870 yd) of each other.

== List of locations ==
- The Qolla il-Bajda Battery
- Some apartments for rent
- A few Saltpans
- Some restaurants
- The bay itself.
- Some residential buildings surrounding the bay.
- Some Diving locations
- Qolla Il-Bajda
- Qolla Is-Safra

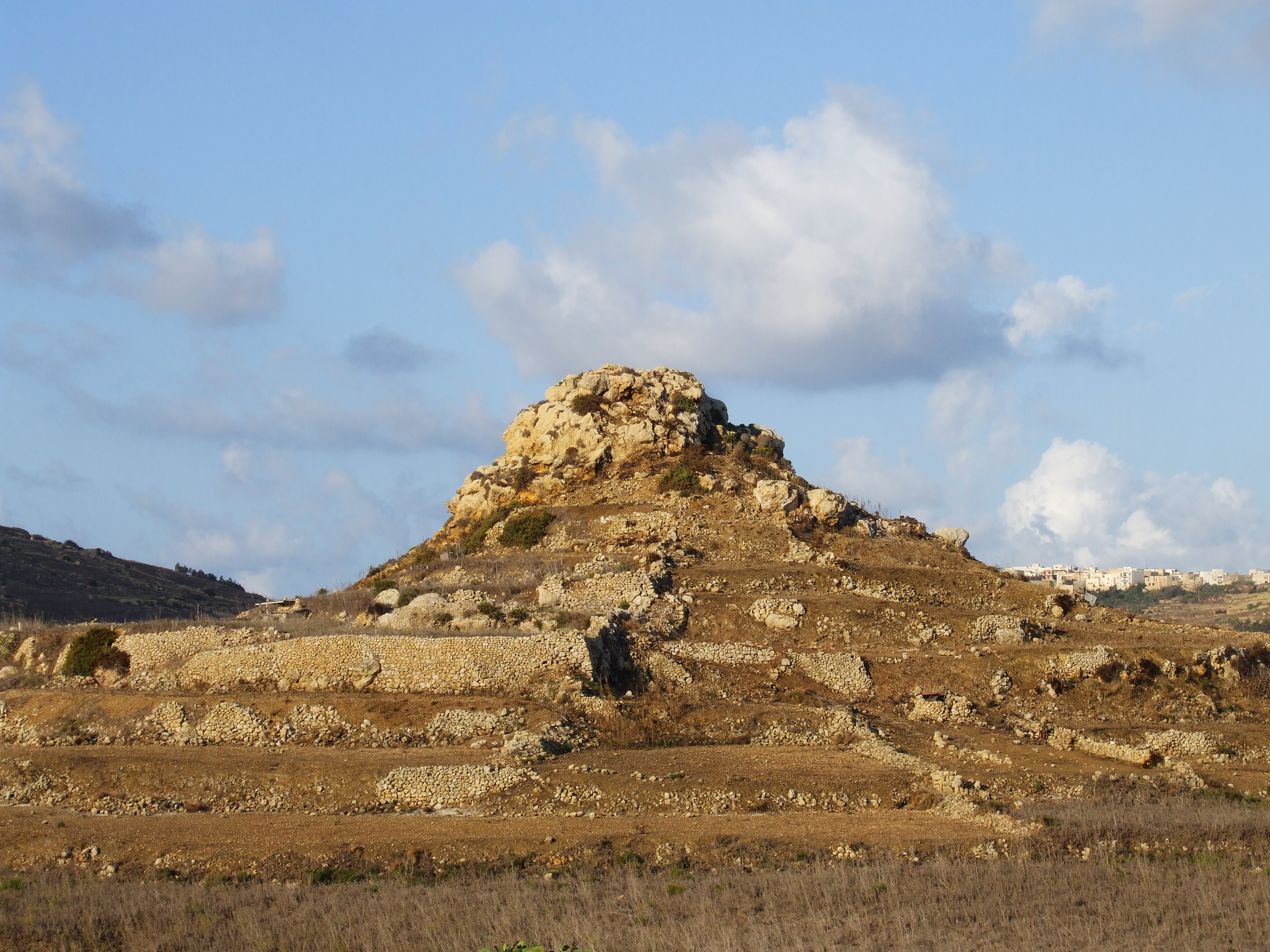
The Qolla Is-Safra
