= Rooks =

Rooks may refer to:

- Rooks (surname), a list of people
- Rooks County, Kansas, United States
- Rooks Creek (disambiguation)
- Rooks Bridge, Rooksbridge, East Brent, Somerset, England, UK, a former bridge
- Chico Rooks, a former American soccer team

== See also ==
- Rook's Textbook of Dermatology
- Senter-Rooks House, Humboldt, Tennessee, United States, a mayoral mansion on the National Register of Historic Places
- Rooksbridge, East Brent, Somerset, England, UK a hamlet where Rooks Bridge was located
- Rook (disambiguation)
