= Rook =

Rook may refer to:

== Common meanings ==
- Rook (bird), a bird of the corvid family
- Rook (chess), a piece in the game of chess

== People ==
- Rook (surname)
- Russell Rook, Baron Rook (The Lord Rook; 21st century), British Anglican priest; elevated to Baron Rook lifepeerage in 2024
- Jared Isaacman (callsign "Rook"), American entrepreneur, e-finance executive, aerospace executive, private astronaut, administrator of NASA
- Martin "Rook" O'Prey (1962–1991), Northern Ireland republican paramilitary
- Erik "Rook" Ortiz, member of the U.S. hiphop collective J.U.S.T.I.C.E. League
- Rook Valard (born 1974), U.S. musician
- a rookie, shortened to rook

== Places ==
- Rook Mountain, a summit in Alaska, USA
- Qolla l-Bajda Battery or Rook, a discothèque in Żebbuġ, Gozo, Malta
- Rook Clift, South Harting, West Sussex, England, UK, a biological Site of Special Scientific Interest
- Rook Street, Mere, Wiltshire, England, UK
- Montes Rook, a mountain range on the Moon

== Arts and entertainment ==
=== Fictional characters ===
- The Rook (comics), a comic book character from Eerie magazine
- Rook (G.I. Joe), in the G.I. Joe universe
- Rook, an Utrom in Teenage Mutant Ninja Turtles season 4
- Rook Bartley, in Robotech
- Rook Blonko, in Ben 10: Omniverse
- Bodhi Rook, in the Star Wars film Rogue One
- Harlan Rook, villain of the 1988 film The Dead Pool
- Alexander Rook, a recurring antagonist in the 2015 Dark Matter television series

=== Other arts and entertainment ===
- Rook (album), 2008 album by Shearwater
- The Rook (novel), a 2011 supernatural thriller by Daniel O'Malley
  - The Rook (TV series), a TV series on Starz
- Rook Islands, a fictional group of islands in the video game Far Cry 3

=== Military ===
- Sukhoi Su-25 "Rook" (Russian: Грач, romanized: Grach, lit. 'Rook', a Russian close air support aircraft
- USS Rooks (DD-804), a destroyer launched in 1944, a Cold War U.S. Navy destroyer
- HMS Rook (1806), a 19th-century British Royal Navy schooner

== Other uses ==
- Rook (card game), a trick-taking card game
- Rook (piercing), a piercing on the anti-helix of the ear
- Rook (rocket), a British rocket in use from 1959 and 1972
- Rook, an 1874 South Devon Railway 0-4-0 locomotive
- .300 Rook, an obsolete rifle cartridge

== See also ==
- Rook rifle, an obsolete rifle intended for shooting small game
- Rook's Textbook of Dermatology
- Rooke
- Rooks (disambiguation)
- Rookie (disambiguation)
- Rok (disambiguation)
