= Rocker =

Rocker or rockers may refer to:

== Places ==
- Rocker, Montana, a neighborhood in Butte, Montana, United States

== People ==
- Rocker, a British drummer, formerly of The Flatmates
- Fermin Rocker (1907–2004), painter and illustrator
- John Rocker (born 1974), American Major League Baseball pitcher
- Kumar Rocker (born 1999), American Major League Baseball pitcher
- Lee Rocker (born 1961), stage name of American rockabilly musician Leon Drucker
- Rudolf Rocker (1873–1958), German writer, historian and prominent anarchist
- Tracy Rocker (born 1966), American college football coach and former player
- Rockers (royal courts), women employed to rock cradles
- Rocker (subculture), British youths interested in motorcycles

== Arts, entertainment, and media ==
=== Films ===
- Rockers (1978 film), a Jamaican film
- Rockers (2003 film), a Japanese film
- The Rocker (film), an American film

=== Music ===
==== Groups ====
- The Rockers (band), a Japanese punk rock band
- Barbie and the Rockers (branded in Europe as Barbie and the Rock Stars), a doll line made by Mattel
- Jesse & The Rockers, an American Christian pop punk band
- Rokeri s Moravu (Rockers from the Morava), a Serbian folk comedy band

==== Albums ====
- Rocker (album), a 2002 album by Kraljevski Apartman
- Rockers (Styx album)
- Rockers (Slade album)
- Rockers (soundtrack), a 1979 film soundtrack

==== Songs ====
- "Rocker", a 1975 song by AC/DC from T.N.T.
- "Rocker", a 2004 song by Alter Ego
- "Rocker", a song by Anti-Nowhere League
- "Rocker", a song composed by Gerry Mulligan
- "Rocker", a song by The 69 Eyes
- "The Rocker" (song), a 1973 song by Thin Lizzy

==== Other uses in music ====
- Rocker, an individual or band that performs rock music
- Rockers, a variation of the one drop rhythm drumbeat in reggae music
- Pocket Rockers, a brand of music player produced by Fisher-Price

=== Other uses in arts, entertainment, and media ===
- Rocker, a Boston-based music magazine founded in 2011, targeted to ages 35 and up
- Rockers (play), a 1993 play by Sherwood Schwartz

== Motorcycling ==
- Rocker (subculture), a British biker subculture that originated in the 1950s/1960s, also known as "Ton Up Boy" and "Greaser"
- Rocker, a generic term for outlaw motorcycle club style motorcyclists in Germany
- Rocker, the top and bottom parts of a "backpatch" or "colors" often worn by a member of a motorcycle club
- Rockers Motor Club, a now-defunct outlaw biker gang and support club for the Hells Angels

== Science and engineering ==
- Rocker (laboratory), a device used for mixing applications
- Rocker, a cradle mechanism formerly used in placer mining
- Rocker, a metal tool with small teeth used in mezzotint printmaking
- Rocker, the rise or curve of a vessel's hull along its keel line (for example in a kayak)
- Rocker, a rocking chair or one of the curved bands which support it
- Rocker arm, part of a 4-stroke engine
- Rocker panel, the body section of a vehicle below the door openings
- Rocker switch for switching between two states of an electrical device

== Sports teams and terminology ==
- Cincinnati Rockers, an Arena Football League team
- Cleveland Rockers, a Women's National Basketball Association (WNBA) team
- Detroit Rockers, an indoor soccer team in the National Professional Soccer League
- High Point Rockers, a team in the Atlantic League of Professional Baseball
- Rocker turn, a turn in figure skating
- SunRockers Tokyo-Shibuya, Japanese professional basketball team
- The Rockers, a professional wrestling tag team
- Rocker, in skiing, see ski geometry

== Other ==
- Rocker bottom shoe

== See also ==
- Rock (disambiguation)
- Rockery (disambiguation)
