= Saint Anthony's Battery =

Artillery battery in Qala, Gozo, Malta

- Batterija ta' Sant'Antnin
- Qala, Gozo, Malta
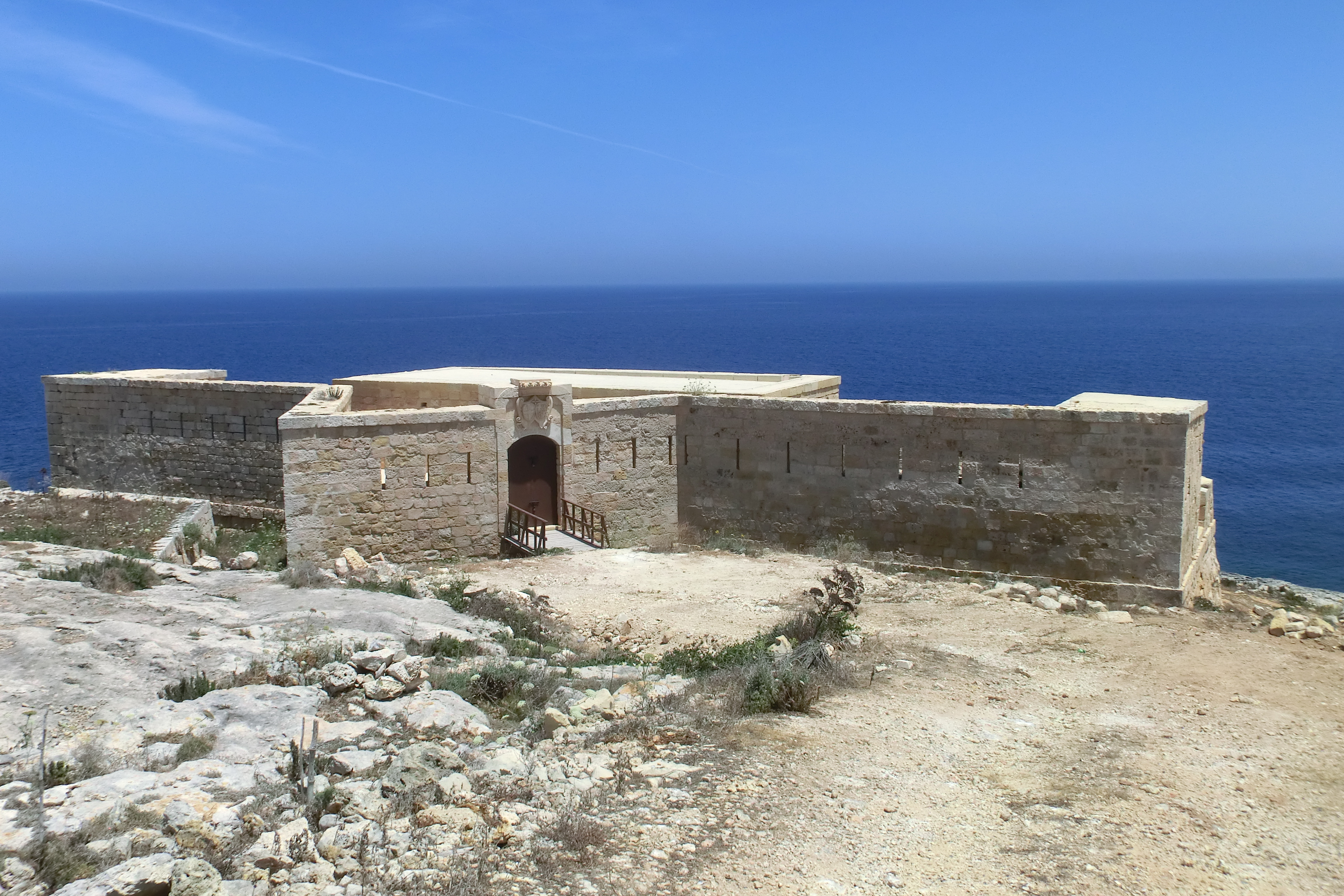
- Saint Anthony's Battery

Site information
- Type: Artillery battery
- Owner: Government of Malta
- Controlled by: Din l-Art Ħelwa; Qala Local Council
- Open to the public: No
- Condition: Intact

Location
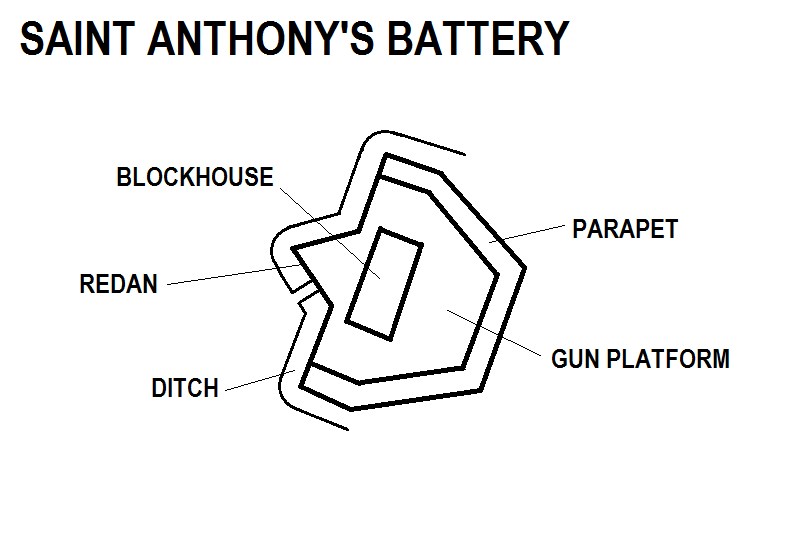
- Map of St. Anthony's Battery
- Coordinates: 36°1′57.9″N 14°20′6.6″E

Site history
- Built: 1731–1732
- Built by: Order of Saint John
- Materials: Limestone

Saint Anthony's Battery (Maltese: Batterija ta' Sant'Antnin) is an artillery battery in Qala, Gozo, Malta. It was built by the Order of Saint John in 1731 and 1732 as one of a series of coastal fortifications around the coasts of the Maltese Islands. It is one of only two surviving batteries on Gozo, the other one being Qolla l-Bajda Battery in Żebbuġ.

The battery is also known as Qala Battery (Maltese: Batterija tal-Qala) or Qala Point Battery (Maltese: Batterija ta' Ras il-Qala), and is known locally as It-Trunċiera (English: The Entrenchment).

== History ==
Saint Anthony's Battery was built by the Order of Saint John on the easternmost point of Gozo, known as Ras il-Qala, and it was intended to guard the channel between Gozo and Comino. The battery was proposed in 1730, and construction commenced in 1731 and was largely complete by December 1732. The final finishing touches were made in 1734. The battery was named after Saint Anthony, as it was built during the reign of António Manoel de Vilhena. It was possibly designed by the military engineer Charles François de Mondion.

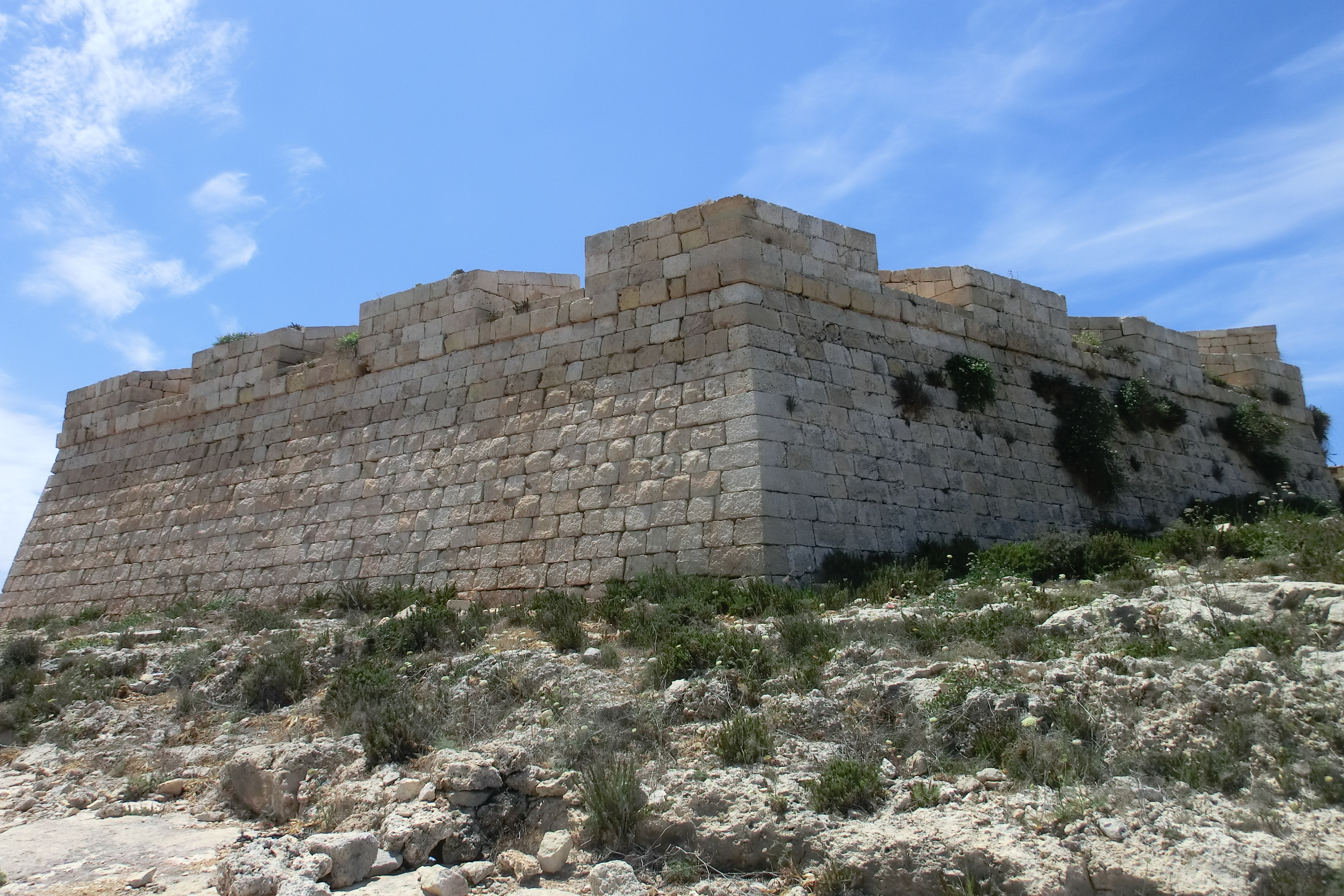
The battery's semi-hexagonal front

The battery was designed with a semi-circular gun platform and two blockhouses at the rear. However, the design was changed and it was built with a semi-hexagonal front. There is a free-standing redan that has thick walls and musketry loopholes to prevent a landward attack. These are shielded by two flanking traverses, and the land front is also surrounded by a shallow ditch. The gateway has the sculpted coat of arms of Grandmaster de Vilhena. The design of the battery is different from other batteries in the Maltese islands, making it unique.

In 1770, the battery was armed with three 8-pounder guns with 427 rounds of roundshot and 75 rounds of grapeshot, and eight 6-pounder guns with 127 rounds of roundshot and 45 rounds of grapeshot.

== Present day ==
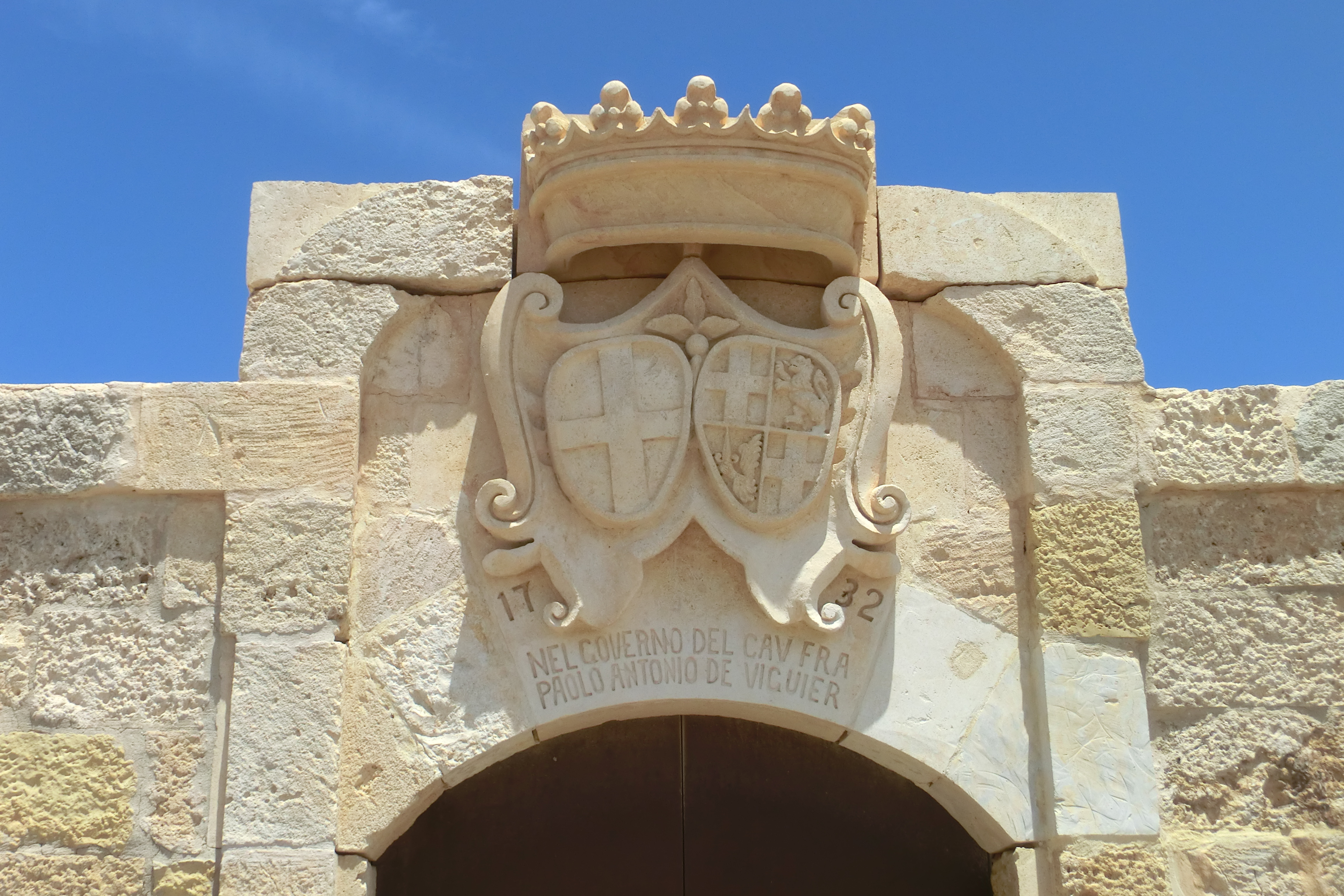
The replica coats of arms

The battery was in a dilapidated state for many years. One of the blockhouses had been demolished, and the gate had collapsed during a storm.

In the 1990s the battery was at the centre of judicial controversy when Magistrate Carol Michael Peralta attempted to give the property to an unspecified third person that claimed to be the owner, potentially to then sell it to him.

Since 2007, the battery is being restored by Din l-Art Ħelwa in conjunction with the Qala Local Council and the Malta Environment and Planning Authority (MEPA). Some of the work was done by Leli Saliba, who was also responsible for the restoration of Isopu Tower. The demolished blockhouse and gateway have both been rebuilt, and now restoration is now almost complete.

The landscape around the battery has remained virtually unchanged since it was built.
