= Rookie (disambiguation) =

A rookie is a person new to a profession or an athlete in their first season.

Rookie, Rookies or The Rookie may also refer to:

== Art ==
- The Rookie (painting), a 1957 painting by Norman Rockwell

== Film and television ==
=== Film ===
- Rookies (1927 film), an American silent comedy film directed by Sam Wood
- The Rookie (1959 film), an American comedy film directed by George O'Hanlon
- The Rookie (1990 film), an American buddy cop film directed by and starring Clint Eastwood
- The Rookie (2002 film), an American baseball film directed by John Lee Hancock
- The Rookies (2019 film), a Chinese action film directed by Alan Yuen
- Rookie (2023 film), a Filipino coming-of-age film directed by Samantha Lee

=== Television ===
- Rookies (American TV series), a 2008–2009 American reality series
- The Rookie, an American police procedural crime drama action series that debuted in 2018
- The Rookie, a 2007–2008 web spinoff of the television series 24
- The Rookies, a 1972–1976 American crime drama series
- "Rookies" (Star Wars: The Clone Wars), an episode of the TV series
- "Rookies" (Heated Rivalry), an episode of the TV series

== Music ==
- Rookie (EP), by Red Velvet, 2017
  - "Rookie" (Red Velvet song), the title song
- "Rookie" (Sakanaction song), 2011
- "Rookie" / "Stay Gold", a single by Flow, 2005
- Rookie, an album by Black Kids, 2017

== Publications ==
- Rookie (magazine), a defunct American online magazine for teenagers created by Tavi Gevinson
- Rookies (manga), a Japanese manga and television drama
- The Rookie (novel), by Scott Sigler

== People ==
- Rookie Brown (1925–1971), American professional basketball player
- Rookie Davis (born 1993), American professional baseball pitcher
- Brian Wilson (poker player) (born 1967), nicknamed "Rookie", American real estate developer and poker player

== Fictional characters ==
- Rookie, a character in the online game Club Penguin
- The Rookie, a character in the 2009 video game Ghostbusters: The Video Game
- The Rookie, the protagonist in the 2009 video game Halo 3: ODST
- The Rookie, the protagonist in the 2018 video game Lego DC Super-Villains
- Rookie, two characters in the 2024–2025 comic book series Nemesis: Rogues' Gallery

== See also ==
- Rookie League
- Ruki (disambiguation)
- Rook (disambiguation)
- Rookery (disambiguation)
