= Ruki =

Ruki may refer to:

== Places ==
- Ruki, Iran, a village in Razavi Khorasan Province
- Ruki River, a tributary of the Congo River in the Democratic Republic of the Congo

== People ==
- Ruki Tobita (born 1999), Japanese snowboarder
- Ruki Tipuna (born 1983), New Zealand rugby union footballer
- Ruki, stage name of Matsumoto Takanori (born 1982), lead singer of the Japanese rock band The Gazette

== Fictional characters ==
- Ruki Irokawa, a main character in the manga series Comic Girls
- Ruki Makino, a character in the Japanese anime television series Digimon Tamers
- Ruki, a type of Neopet

== See also ==
- Ruki sound law, a phonological law in some Indo-European branches
- Te Ruki Kawiti (1770s–1854), Māori rangatira (chief)
- Ruky Abdulai (born 1985), Ghanaian-born Canadian long jumper and heptathlete
- Roki (disambiguation)
- Rookie
