= Rockery (disambiguation) =

A rockery or rock garden is an element of grounds design.

Rockery may also refer to:

- The Rockery, Easton, Massachusetts, USA; a Memorial Cairn created by Frederick Law Olmsted
- The Grand Rockery (Chinese: 大假山; pinyin: Dà Jiǎshān), a rock garden located in Shanghai, China's Yu Garden
- The Rockery, a hall located in Hong Kong's Nan Lian Garden
- The Rockeries, a rock garden with multiton piled rocks in Derbyshire, England, UK, at the Chatsworth House
- The Rockery, a rock garden located in Preston Park, Brighton
- Rockery Cottage, a Scottish listed building; see List of listed buildings in Dirleton, East Lothian

== See also ==
- Rookery (disambiguation)
- Rock garden (disambiguation)
- Rocker (disambiguation)
- Rockies (disambiguation)
- Rocky (disambiguation)
- Rock (disambiguation)
