= Rooke =

Rooke is a surname, and may refer to:

- Adolphus Rooke (1814–1881), English settler in Van Diemen's Land
- Arthur Rooke (1878–1947), British actor and silent film director
- Barbara Rooke (1917–1978), Canadian scholar
- Bernard Rooke (born 1938), British artist and studio potter
- Charles Rooke (1869–1946), Irish rugby union player
- Constance Rooke (1942–2008), Canadian academic
- Daphne Rooke (1914–2009), South African author
- Sir Denis Rooke (1924–2008), English engineer
- Frank A. Rooke (1862–1946), American architect
- Sir George Rooke (1650–1709), English admiral
- George Rooke (priest) (1702–1754), English cleric and academic
- Sir Giles Rooke (1743–1808), English judge
- Hayman Rooke (1723–1806), English major and antiquary
- Henry Rooke (1841–1901), merchant and politician in Tasmania
- Henry Rooke (priest), Irish Anglican priest
- Irene Rooke (1878–1958), English actress
- Jack Rooke (born 1993), English comedian and writer
- James Rooke (British Army general) (1742–1805), English general and politician
- James Rooke (British Legion officer) (1770–1819), British soldier in the Napoleonic wars
- Jessie Rooke (1845–1906), Australian women's rights campaigner
- Katerina Anghelaki-Rooke (1939–2020), Greek poet
- Lawrence Rooke (1622–1662), English astronomer
- Leon Rooke (born 1934), Canadian novelist
- Martin Rooke (born 1972), English para-badminton player
- Matthew Rooke, British musician, composer and performer
- Max Rooke (born 1981), Australian footballer
- Noel Rooke (1881–1953), British wood-engraver and artist
- Jordan (Pamela Rooke) (1955–2022), English model and actress
- Patrick Rooke (born 1955), Church of Ireland bishop
- Robert Levi Rooke (1891–1994), American businessman
- Rodney Rooke (born 1970), English footballer
- Ronnie Rooke (1911–1985), English footballer
- Steven Rooke, Australian actor
- Thomas Charles Byde Rooke (1806–1858), English physician who married into the royal family of the Kingdom of Hawaii
- Thomas Matthews Rooke (1842–1942), British watercolourist
- William Michael Rooke (1794–1847), Irish composer

== See also ==
- Umboi Island
