= Qolla l-Bajda Battery =

Artillery Battery in Żebbuġ, Gozo, Malta

- Batterija tal-Qolla l-Bajda
- Żebbuġ, Gozo, Malta
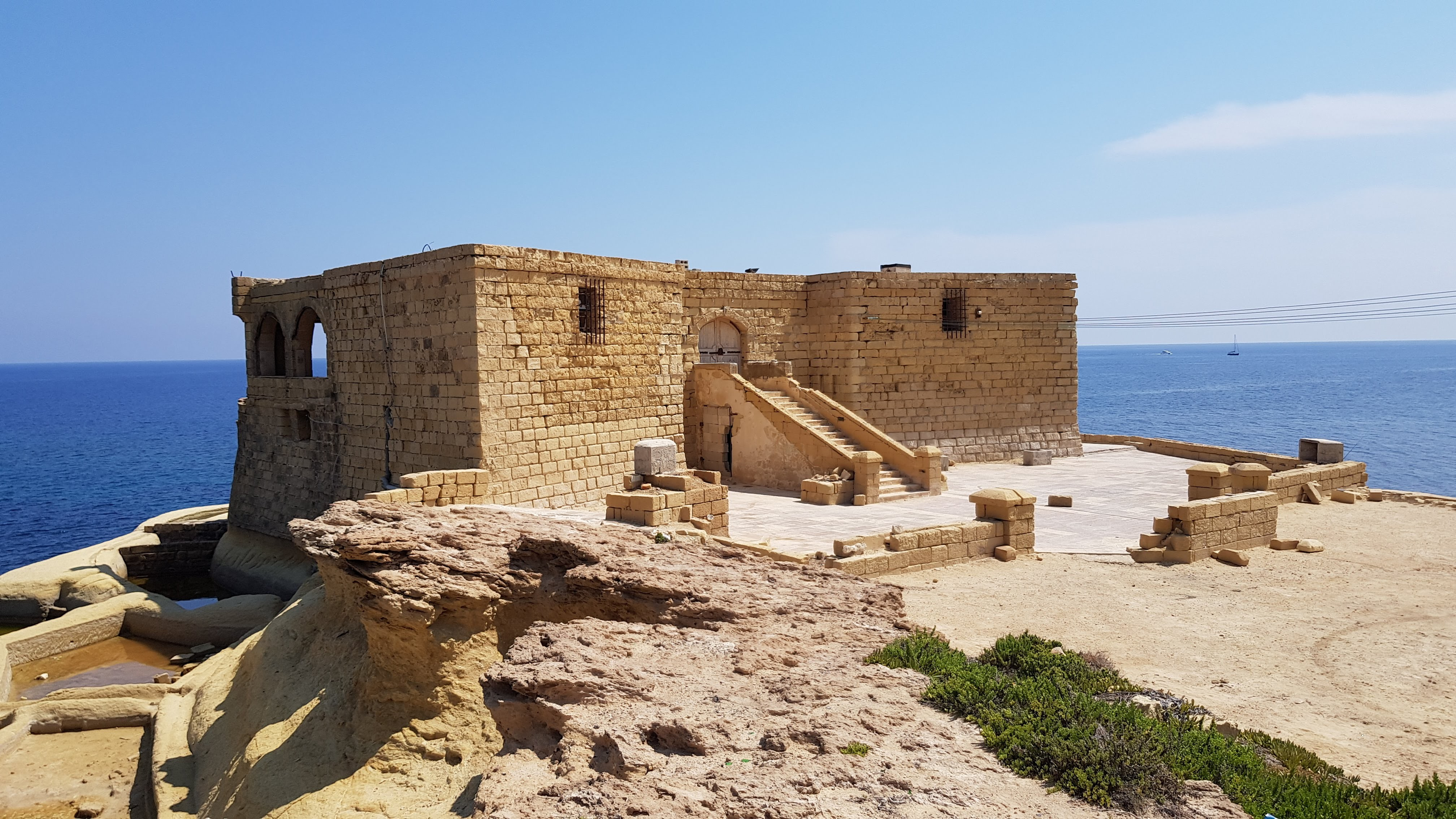
- Qolla l-Bajda Battery

Site information
- Type: Artillery battery
- Owner: Government of Malta
- Controlled by: Rook Limited
- Open to the public: No
- Condition: Intact but dilapidated

Location
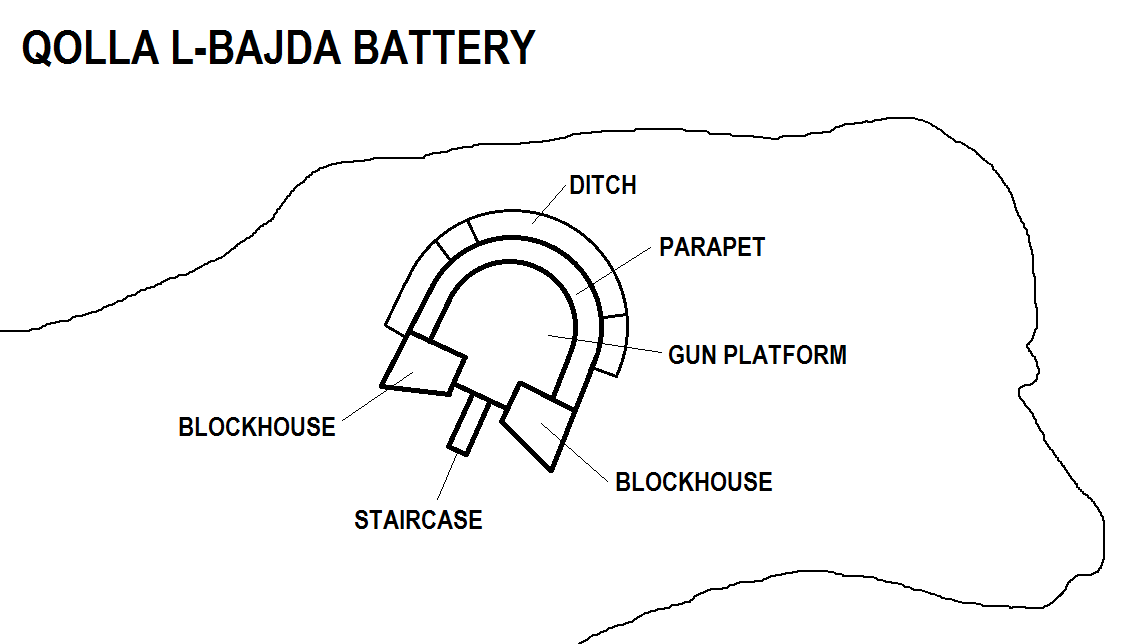
- Map of Qolla l-Bajda Battery in its original configuration
- Coordinates: 36°4′47.4″N 14°15′4.6″E

Site history
- Built: 1715–1716
- Built by: Order of Saint John
- In use: 1716–19th century 1940s
- Materials: Limestone
- Battles/wars: World War II

Qolla l-Bajda Battery (Maltese: Batterija tal-Qolla l-Bajda or Fortina tal-Qolla l-Bajda) is an artillery battery in Żebbuġ, Gozo, Malta. It was built by the Order of Saint John in 1715 and 1716 as one of a series of coastal fortifications around the coasts of the Maltese Islands. It retained its original layout until the late 1970s, when it was converted into a discothèque and snack bar known as Rook (after the chess piece) and major alterations were made to the battery. The building, in the midst of a legal battle between the government and a private company, is now abandoned and in a dilapidated state.

Qolla l-Bajda Battery is one of only two surviving batteries on Gozo, the other one being Saint Anthony's Battery in Qala. It is not far from the northernmost point of the island, Reqqa Point, and as such it is the northernmost fortification in Malta. The battery is also known by a number of other names, including Xwejni Battery (Maltese: Batterija tax-Xwejni), Qbajjar Battery (Maltese: Batterija tal-Qbajjar) or the Castello.

== History ==
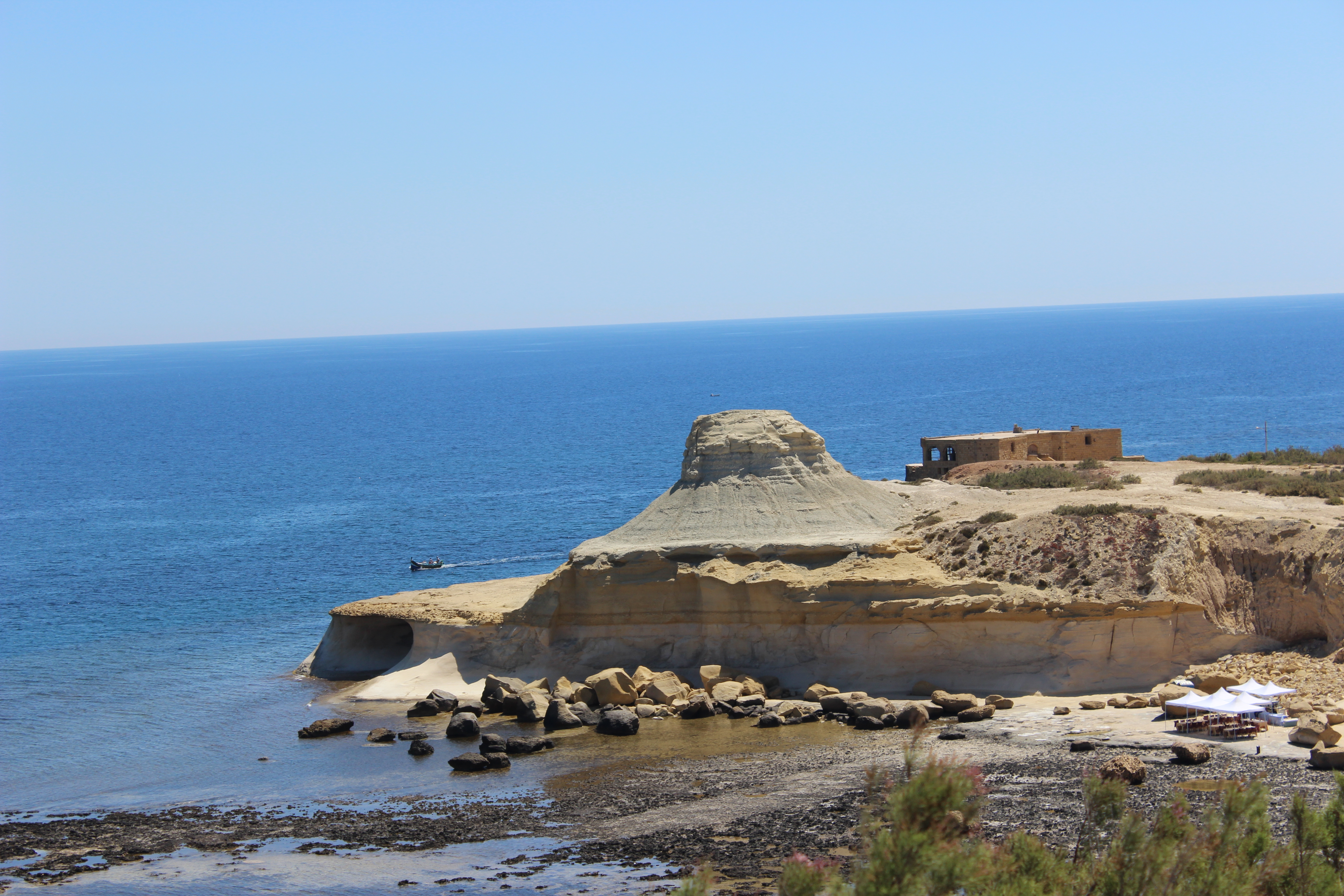
The hillock Qolla l-Bajda, with the battery in the background.

Qolla l-Bajda Battery was built by the Order of Saint John in 1716 on the spur of land between the bays of Xwejni and Qbajjar. It was named after a nearby hillock known as Qolla l-Bajda (the White Hillock). It was designed by the military engineers Jacques de Camus d'Arginy and Bernard de Fontet.

The battery is the only surviving part of a chain of fortifications that defended Marsalforn and nearby bays from Ottoman or Barbary attacks. The other towers, batteries, redoubts and entrenchments were all demolished or destroyed.

The battery consists of a semi-circular gun platform ringed by a parapet with six embrasures, and two blockhouses joined by a wall. The blockhouses had musketry loopholes intended to protect the battery from a land attack. A ramp originally led to the entrance, which is located between the blockhouses. The battery's seaward side is protected by a small ditch, and salt pans are located close by.

It was initially armed with six guns, but in 1770, its armament consisted of four 6-pounder guns with 276 rounds of roundshot and 60 rounds of grapeshot.

The battery was abandoned in the 19th century, but was again used as Observation Post No. 5 during World War II.

== Recent history ==
In 1978, the government leased the battery to Francis Vella, and it was converted into a discothèque and snack bar. At this point, some structures were built on the gun platform, the entrance was enlarged, and the ramp leading to it was replaced by a flight of steps. The emphyteusis was transferred to Rook Limited in 1981, and the lease expired in February 2003, but the company continued to occupy the battery. It was subsequently abandoned and it fell into a state of disrepair. The area around it, including the salt pans, is also in a dilapidated state.

The NGO Din l-Art Ħelwa has asked for permission to take over the battery and restore it. In response, the Superintendence of Cultural Heritage made a request to the Land Department, which issued an eviction order against Rook Limited in 2007. Since then, the battery has been in the midst of a legal battle between the government and the company.

The battery was vandalized several times, including in 2013 when graffiti were sprayed over the facade. This has since been removed.
