= Roki =

Roki may refer to:

== People ==
- Rodoljub Roki Vulović (born 1955), Bosnian Serb singer
- Roki (musician) (born 1985), Zimbabwean musician
- Nikša Roki (born 1988), Croatian swimmer
- Rōki Sasaki (born 2001), Japanese baseball player

== Other uses ==
- Röki, 2020 adventure video game
- Roki Spa, an army of mercenaries in the Kingdom of Georgia
- Roki Tunnel, a mountain tunnel in Georgia and Russia
- RoKi Naiset, a Finnish ice hockey team
- Rovaniemen Kiekko (RoKi), a Finnish ice hockey team
