= Parish Church of the Assumption of Mary, Żebbuġ =

Parish Church of the Assumption of the Blessed Virgin Mary into Heaven
- Knisja Parrokkjali ta' Santa Marija Assunta
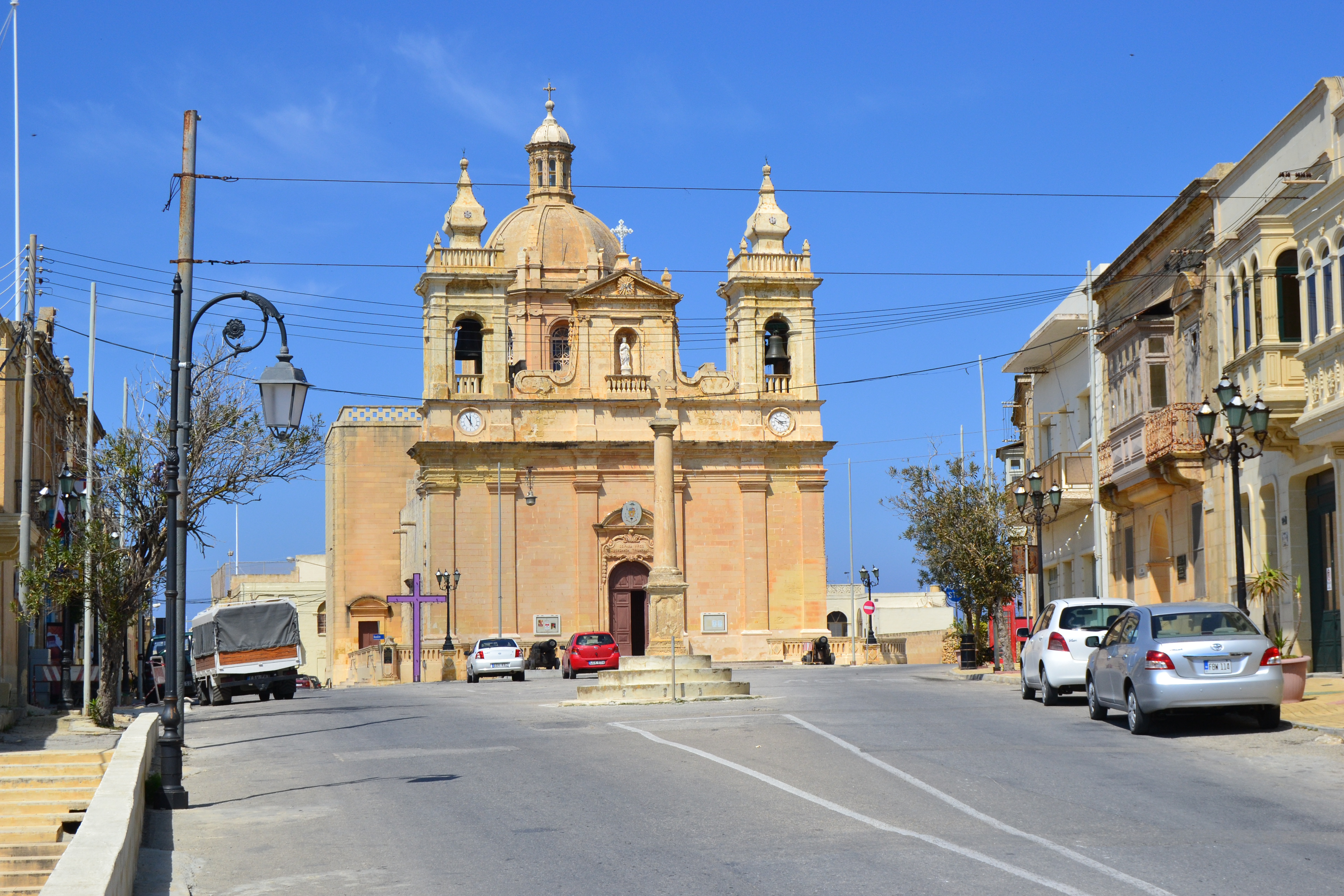
- The church in 2011
- Parish Church of the Assumption of the Blessed Virgin Mary into Heaven
- 36°04′11.4″N 14°14′09.8″E
- Location: Żebbuġ, Gozo, Malta
- Denomination: Roman Catholic
- Website: zebbugparish.com

History
- Status: Parish church
- Founded: c. 1615 (earliest reference)
- Dedication: Assumption of Mary
- Consecrated: 30 September 1726

Architecture
- Functional status: Active
- Style: Baroque
- Years built: 1690–1726; 1938–1942 (enlarged)

Specifications
- Materials: Limestone

Administration
- Diocese: Gozo

The Parish Church of the Assumption of the Blessed Virgin Mary into Heaven (Maltese: Knisja Parrokkjali ta' Santa Marija Assunta) is a Roman Catholic parish church in Żebbuġ, Gozo, Malta, dedicated to the Assumption of Mary. The present building was built between 1690 and 1726 on the site of an earlier church, and it was enlarged between 1938 and 1942. The church's interior was extensively decorated using locally sourced travertine from cave deposits (commonly referred to as "onyx" or "alabaster") in the late 20th century.

== History ==
The site of the building has been occupied by a church dedicated to the Assumption of Mary for centuries. The earliest known reference to a chapel is in a 1615 pastoral visit, and the Bishop of the time found it to be well-maintained. A larger chapel was constructed in around 1640–44, and it became the village's parish church when Bishop Davide Cocco Palmieri established Żebbuġ as a parish on 28 April 1688.

The existing building proved too small, and construction of the present church began in 1690. It was completed and consecrated on 30 September 1726. It was the first church in Gozo apart from the Cathedral to include aisles, and the building is one of the oldest parish churches on the island.

The church was enlarged between 1938 and 1942. It was raised to Archipresbyteral status on 12 March 1963. The church interior was extensively decorated with "onyx" in the 1980s, with sculptural work being carried out by the master craftsman and designer Ronald Pisani.

The church building is listed on the National Inventory of the Cultural Property of the Maltese Islands. In 2019 major restoration work on the church's belfries began.

== Architecture ==
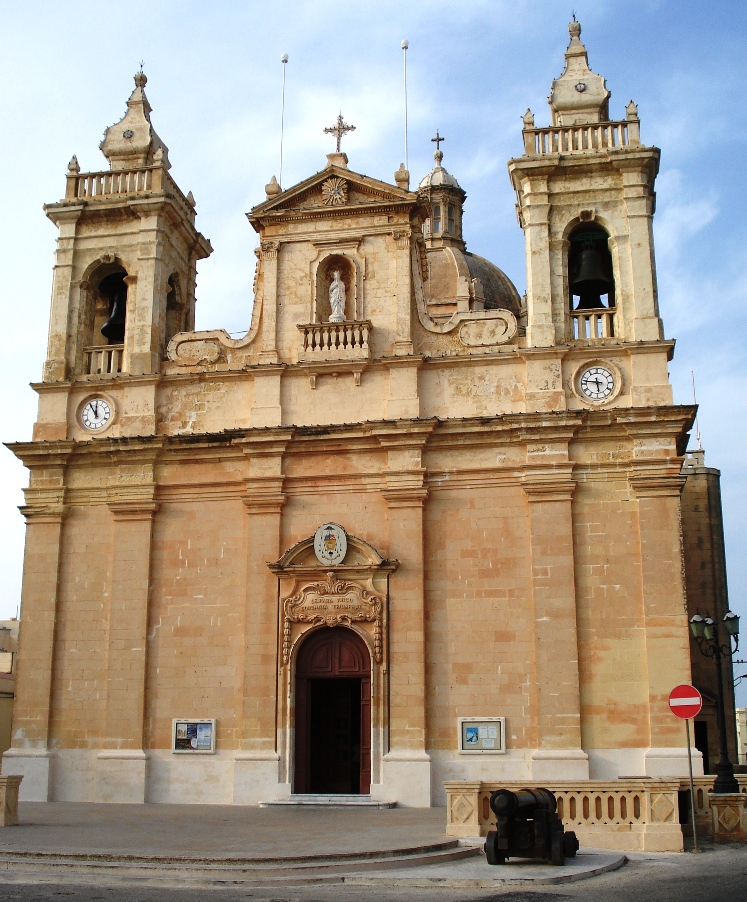
The façade

The church has a simple but elegant façade. The decorations consist of three sets of two pilasters, each of which are raised on a plinth. A portal containing the main doorway is located in the centre of the façade, between two of the pilasters. It is decorated with mouldings and it is topped by an inscription and a rounded pediment. A cornice runs along the entire façade, above which there is a wide entablature and two bell towers. In the centre of the upper part of the façade, there is a balcony with a niche of St. Mary, above which there is a triangular pediment. The church also includes a dome.

The church's interior is extensively decorated with travertine from cave deposits, which is commonly referred to as "onyx marble" (Maltese: oniċe) or "Gozo alabaster", although these names are incorrect. A deposit of this stone was discovered in 1738 in a field in the area of Taċ-Ċaqra or Is-Sagħtrija on the outskirts of Żebbuġ. In the 1980s, it was used to decorate most of the building interior, including the high altar, choir, baptistery and confessionals. The altar, with Pisani's sculpted chalice, loaves and grapes, is regarded as the main attraction of the church. Some of the "onyx" from Żebbuġ was also used in other churches in the Maltese Islands, but not to the extent used in the Żebbuġ parish church.

== Paintings and statues ==
The titular painting of the church depicts the Holy Trinity crowning the head of the Blessed Virgin, and it was painted by Francesco de Dominics in the 1730s. The painting was crowned by Bishop Nikol Joseph Cauchi in August 1980. Other paintings in the church include the Nativity of Our Lady and the Presentation of Jesus in the Temple, which are both the work of Antonio Zammit done in 1850.

The chapel in the left transept contains an altarpiece depicting the Immaculate Conception. Some people hold the painting to be miraculous, with Mary's face reportedly turning yellow or pale whenever a catastrophe is about to occur. According to legend, a woman resembling the figure in the painting also attacked corsairs who raided the countryside around Żebbuġ.

The chapel in the right transept contains a korpsant (a statue containing relics) of Saint Fortunatus, a Roman martyr whose body was brought from the Catacombs of Saint Agnes in Rome. The relic had belonged to the family of the politician Fortunato Mizzi, and they donated it to the parish in 1922.

The titular statue of the Assumption was purchased from Gallard et Fils of Marseille in 1863, making it the oldest statue of the Assumption on Gozo. The church also includes a statue of Saint Anthony of Padua made in 1904, a statue of Saint Joseph made in 1906, and a statue of Saint Thérèse of Lisieux made in 1922. A statue of Our Lady of the Rosary was blessed in 1919.

The parish also owns a set of statues showing various episodes of the Passion of Jesus, which are used in the annual Good Friday procession.
