= Rook Mountain =

Mountain summit in Alaska, United States

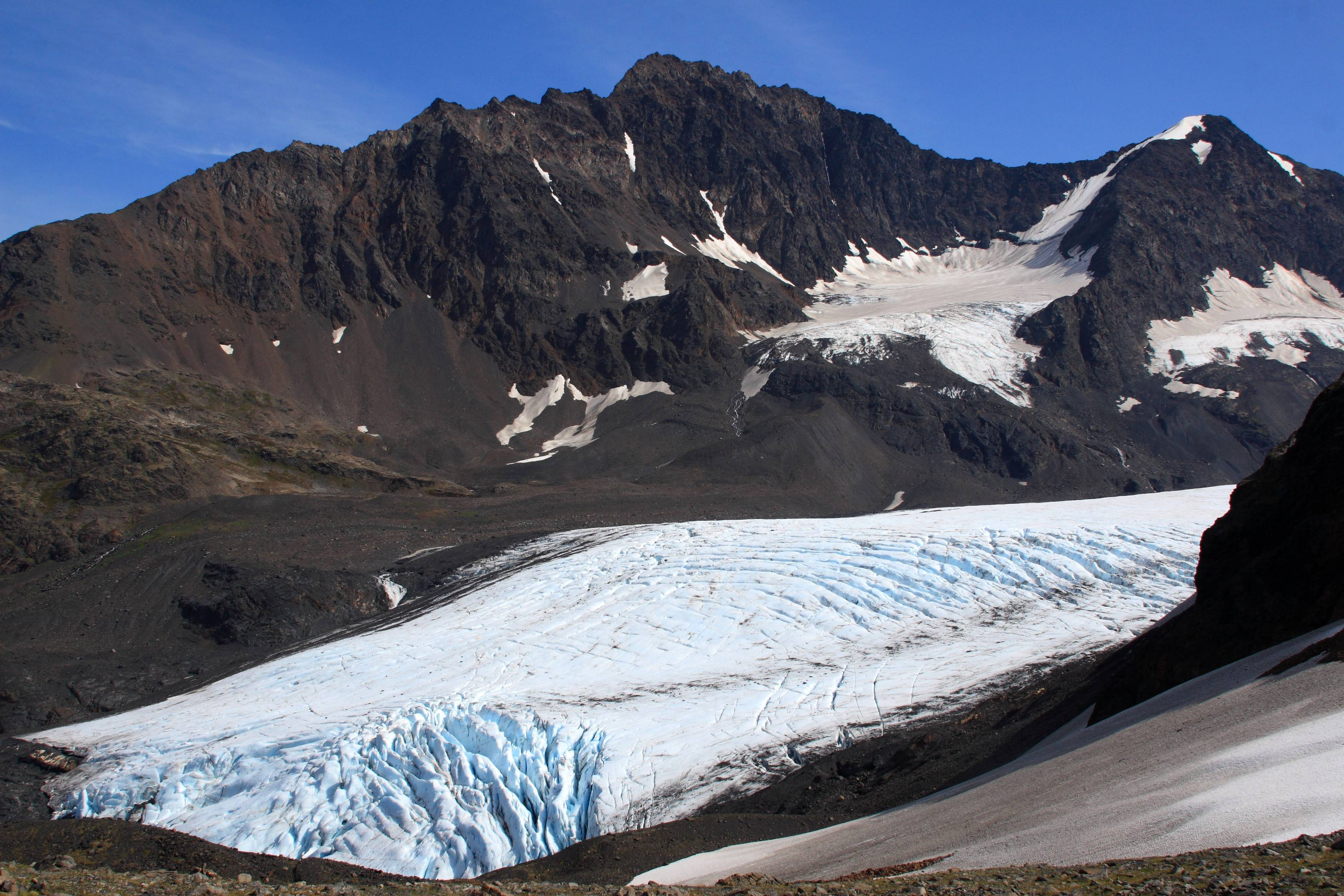
- Southwest aspect, from Crow Pass

Highest point
- Elevation: 6,685 ft (2,038 m)
- Prominence: 1,085 ft (331 m)
- Parent peak: Whiteout Peak (7,135 ft)
- Isolation: 5.11 mi (8.22 km)
- Coordinates: 61°04′38″N 149°04′11″W

Geography
- Location within Alaska
- Interactive map of Rook Mountain
- Location: Municipality of Anchorage
- Country: United States
- State: Alaska
- Protected area: Chugach State Park
- Parent range: Chugach Mountains
- Topo map: USGS Anchorage A-6

Climbing
- First ascent: 1963

Rook Mountain is a 6,685-foot-elevation (2,038-meter) mountain summit in Alaska, United States.

== Description ==
Rook Mountain is located 30 miles (48 km) east-southeast of Anchorage in the Chugach Mountains and Chugach State Park. It ranks as the 27th-highest peak within the park. Precipitation runoff from the mountain drains to Knik Arm via Raven Creek and the Eagle River. Topographic relief is significant as the summit rises approximately 4,685 feet (1,428 m) above Raven Creek in two miles (3.2 km). The mountain's toponym has not been officially adopted by the U.S. Board on Geographic Names.

== Climate ==
Based on the Köppen climate classification, Rook Mountain is located in a tundra climate zone with long, cold, snowy winters, and cool summers. Weather systems coming off the Gulf of Alaska are forced upwards by the Chugach Mountains (orographic lift), causing heavy precipitation in the form of rainfall and snowfall. Winter temperatures can drop below −10 °F with wind chill factors below −20 °F. This climate supports the Raven Glacier to the south, Eagle Glacier to the east, and smaller unnamed glaciers on the north slope.

== Gallery ==
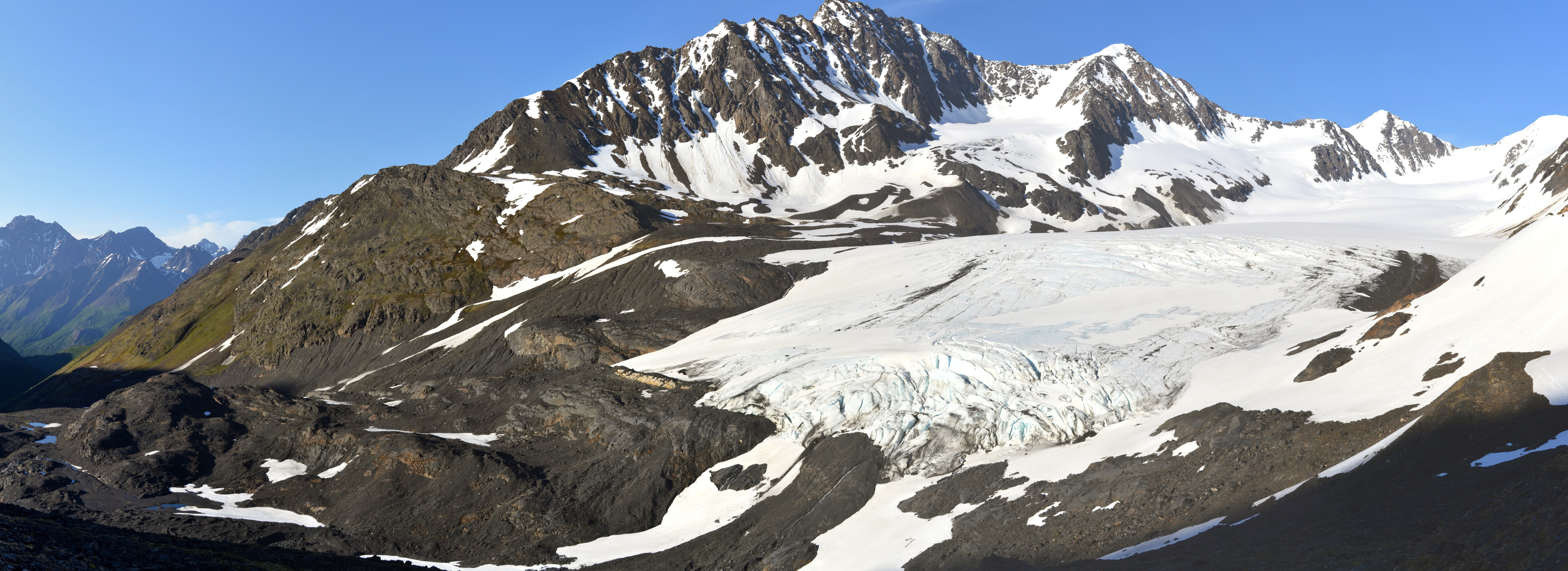
Rook Mountain and Raven Glacier

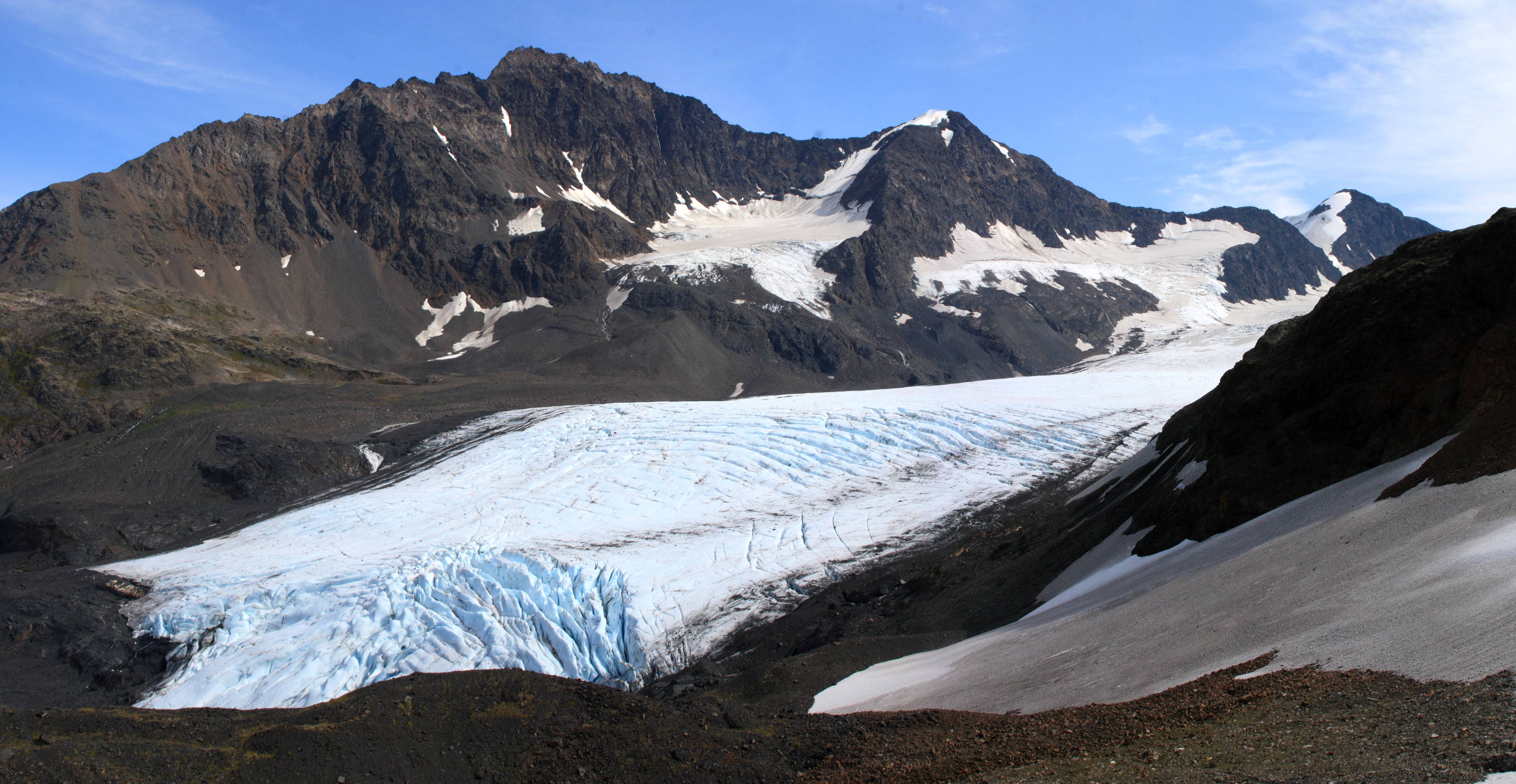
Rook Mountain and Raven Glacier

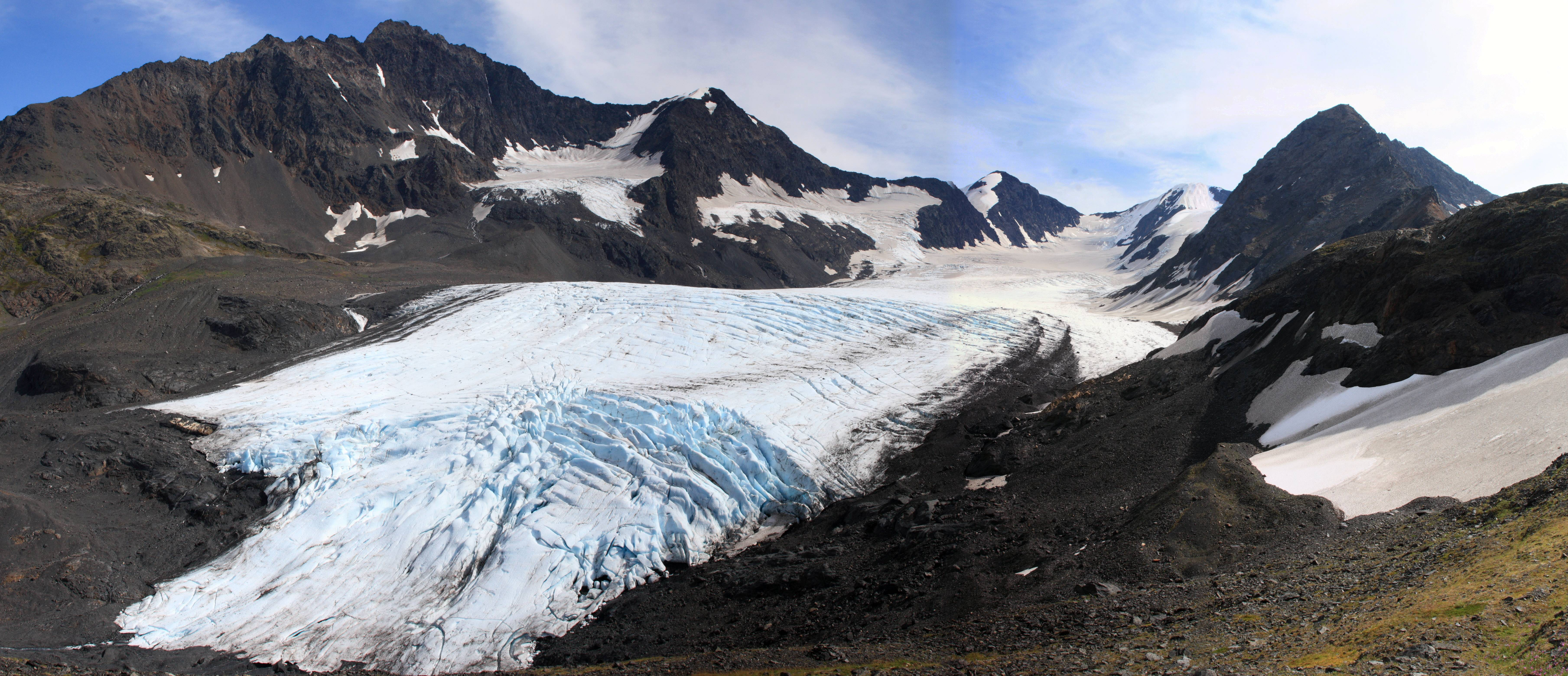
Rook Mountain and Raven Glacier

== See also ==
- List of mountain peaks of Alaska
- Geography of Alaska
