= Rock garden (disambiguation) =

A rock garden is a type of garden that features extensive use of rocks or stones, along with plants native to rocky or alpine environments.

Rock garden may also refer to:

- Alpine garden, a domestic or botanical garden specialising in the collection and cultivation of alpine plants growing naturally at high altitudes around the world
- An area of exposed rocks on a wilderness watercourse, such as the Back River
- Japanese rock garden, also called a zen garden, creates a miniature stylized landscape
- Rock Garden of Chandigarh, India, a sculpture garden
- Rock Garden, Darjeeling, West Bengal, India, a road-side picnic ground around a natural waterfall
- Rock Garden (album), a 2006 album by Ty Tabor
- Rock Garden, a music venue located in Covent Garden, London during the late 1970s and 1980s

== See also ==
- Rock the Garden, an annual summer music festival in Minneapolis, Minnesota, US
- Rockery (disambiguation)
