= Rooks (surname) =

Rooks is a surname. Notable people with the surname include:

- Adam Rooks (born 2000), English rugby league footballer
- Albert H. Rooks (1891–1942), United States Navy captain posthumously awarded the Medal of Honor
- Billy Rooks (1890–1972), English footballer
- Conrad Rooks (1934–2011), American writer, director and producer
- Dickie Rooks (1940–2024), English footballer
- George Rooks (1863–1935), American Major League Baseball player in May 1891
- Kenneth Rooks (born 1999), American steeplechase runner
- Lowell Ward Rooks (1893−1973), United States Army major general
- Noliwe Rooks (born 1963), American professor of Africana studies and author
- Pamela Rooks (1958–2010), Indian film director and screenwriter born Pamela Juneja
- Sean Rooks (1969–2016), American National Basketball Association player
- Steven Rooks (born 1960), Dutch former road racing cyclist
- Taylor Rooks (born 1992), American sports journalist and broadcaster
- Tavon Rooks (born 1990), an American former National Football League player

== See also ==
- Rook (surname)
