= Roki Spa =

Mercenary group in the medieval Caucuses

The Roki Spa (Georgian: როქის სპა) was an army of mercenaries between the 12th and 13th centuries recruited by Georgian monarchs during the wars. The term Roki was adopted from Byzantine Empire — Roga (ῥόγα) that meant cash salary, especially remunerations paid to members of the armed forces and civil service. It was probably formed after the successful military reforms of David IV of Georgia. He made provision for the recruitment of a mercenary army among Alans, Kasogs, Durdzuks, Kipchaks, Kurds, etc. They were armored in Chorasmian style and were headed by Monatukhutsesi (Master of Servants). Their duty was protection of strategic places, such as castles in frontier provinces, where they would be headed by Tsikhistavi (governor of castles).

The number of employees depended on the country's economic ability. The hired mercenaries were sometimes paid with money, sometimes even in nature (shells, fowl, cattle, precious things, weapons...etc.). In order to pay a hired army, the government even imposed special taxes. Between the 12th to 13th centuries such a tax was called "Sak'ivchak'o". The mercenaries were used by the central authorities against both the foreign enemy, as well as feudal opposition. The mercenary army was never a major military force of Georgian feudal army, it only served as a supportive force.

== See also ==
- Hetaireia
- Varangian Guard
- Monaspa

== Bibliography ==
- Baramize, A. Shot’a Rust’veli da misi poema. Tbilisi, 1966.
- Nikoloz Berdzenishvili, Issues Concerning History of Georgia [Sakartvelos istoriis sakitkhebi], 7nd ed. (Tbilisi: 1974)
- ჩხატარაიშვილი ქ., უცხოელები XII საუკუნის საქართველოს ლაშქარში, კრ.: საქართველო რუსთაველის ხანაში, თბ., 1966;
- ჩხატარაიშვილი ქ., ქსე, ტ. 7, გვ. 91–92, თბ., 1984
