= Rocker (laboratory) =

A rocker is a device used in laboratories for molecular and biological mixing applications. Rockers are often used in place of shakers when less aggressive mixing is required.

Rockers are commonly used for staining and de-staining gels after electrophoresis, hybridization, washing, blotting, Cell culture and gentle mixing.

Two-dimensional rockers use a platform that moves in a seesaw motion to create waves in liquid laboratory samples. Three-dimensional rockers move a platform in a three-dimensional gyratory motion to create a gentle swirling of samples.

Typical features of laboratory rockers include variable speeds, and tilt angles. Rockers are often designed to accept stackable platforms or may be outfitted with multiple tiers to increase capacity without increasing the footprint. Platform surfaces are usually covered with rubber pads to prevent objects from slipping during operation.
