= Rookery Lake =

Lake of Antarctica

Coordinates: 68°29′10″S 78°06′55″E

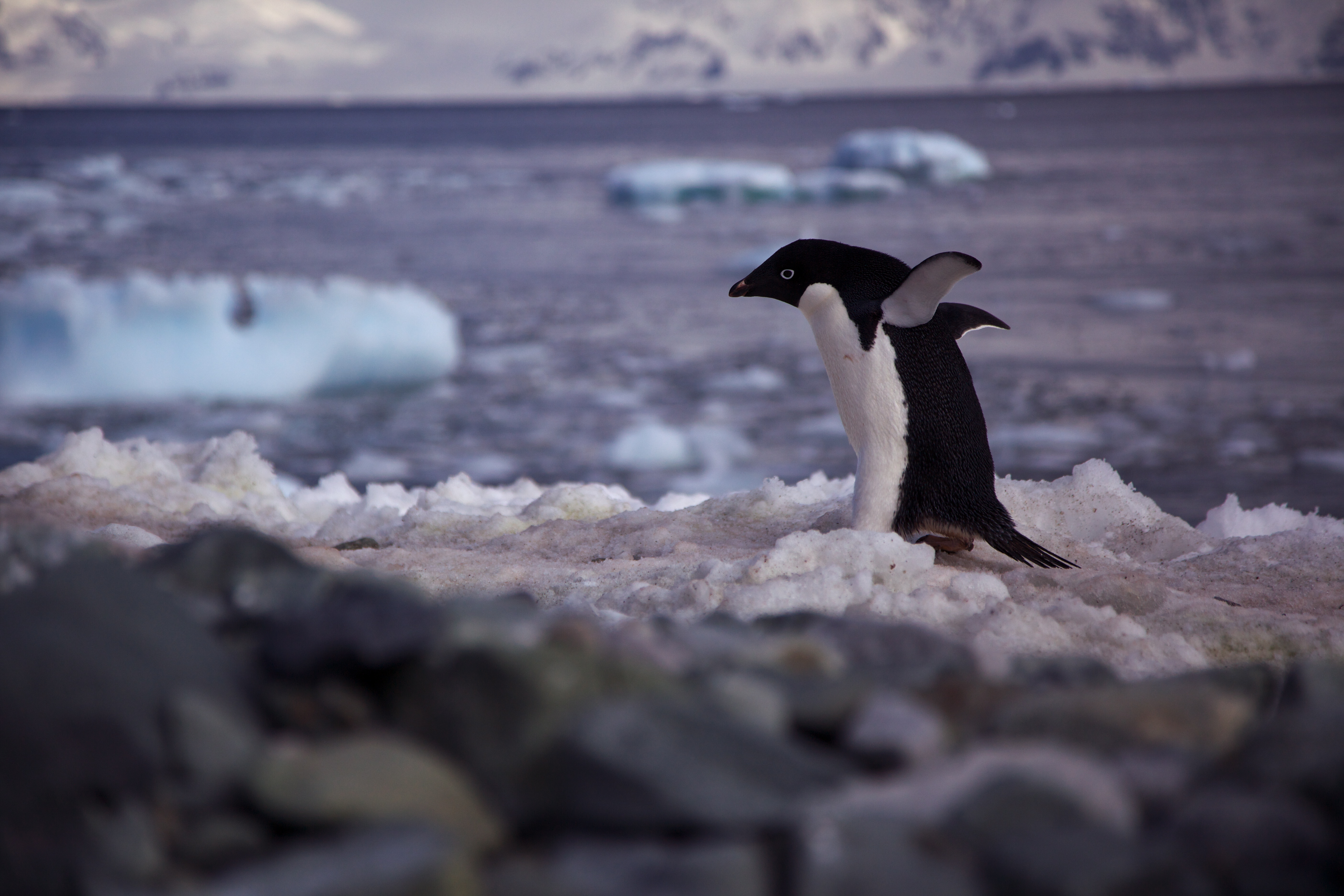
Adélie penguins breed in the IBA

Rookery Lake is an almost circular lake, just cut off from the sea, at the western end of Long Peninsula in the Vestfold Hills of Princess Elizabeth Land, Antarctica. It was so named because of its proximity to an Adélie penguin colony. The nearest permanent research station is Australia's Davis, 10 km to the south-west on Broad Peninsula.

== Important Bird Area ==
A 741 ha site comprising the western part of Long Peninsula and extending 6 km from Rookery Lake in the south-west to Bulatnaya Bay in the north-west, has been designated an Important Bird Area (IBA) by BirdLife International, because it supports some 45,000 breeding pairs of Adélie Penguins. It is mainly ice free in the summer, and contains several low hills rising to a maximum height of 74 m.
