= Henry Rooke (priest) =

Irish Anglican priest

Henry Benjamin Rooke was an Irish Anglican priest.

Rooke was born in Dublin and educated at Trinity College there. He was ordained in 1854. His first post was as Chancellor's vicar at St Patrick's Cathedral, Dublin. He was rector of Wicklow from 1873 to 1906; and Archdeacon of Glendalough from 1906 until 1914.
