= Whiteout Peak =

Mountain in Alaska, United States

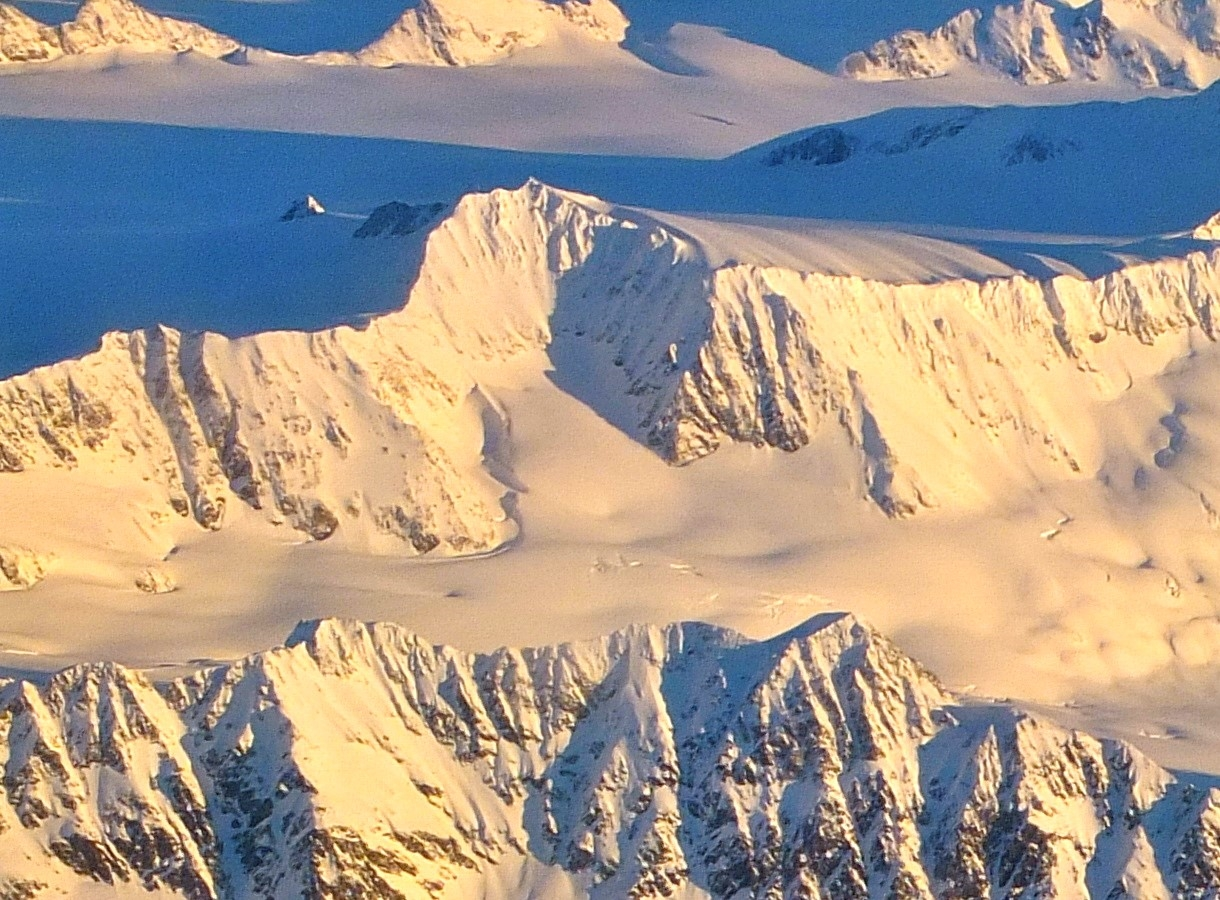
- Aerial view of south aspect, centered

Highest point
- Elevation: 7,135 ft (2,175 m)
- Prominence: 1,885 ft (575 m)
- Parent peak: Troublesome Peak
- Isolation: 5.72 mi (9.21 km)
- Coordinates: 61°07′46″N 148°54′27″W

Naming
- Etymology: Whiteout (weather)

Geography
- Location within Alaska
- Interactive map of Whiteout Peak
- Country: United States
- State: Alaska
- Borough: Anchorage
- Protected area: Chugach State Park
- Parent range: Chugach Mountains
- Topo map: USGS Anchorage A-6

Climbing
- First ascent: May 28, 1967

Whiteout Peak is a 7,135-foot (2,175 m) mountain summit in the U.S. state of Alaska.

== Description ==
Whiteout Peak is located 33 miles (53 km) east of Anchorage in the Chugach Mountains and Chugach State Park. It ranks as the 12th-highest peak within the park. Precipitation runoff and glacial meltwater from the mountain drains north to Knik Arm via the Knik River and the Eagle River. Although modest in elevation, relief is significant as the summit rises over 3,600 feet (1,097 m) above the Eagle Glacier in three miles (4.8 km). The landform's descriptive name was applied in 1963 by members of the Mountaineering Club of Alaska as it pertains to the usual surface weather conditions experienced by mountaineers in the area. A whiteout is an opaque diffusion of sky and snow. The mountain's toponym was officially adopted in 1964 by the U.S. Board on Geographic Names. The first ascent of the summit was made May 28, 1967, by Bill Hauser, Kyle Atkins, Gordon Reese, Dr. Charles Munns, and Dr. Ward Hubert.

== Climate ==
Based on the Köppen climate classification, Whiteout Peak is located in a tundra climate zone with long, cold, snowy winters, and cool summers. Weather systems coming off the Gulf of Alaska are forced upwards by the Chugach Mountains (orographic lift), causing heavy precipitation in the form of rainfall and snowfall. Winter temperatures can drop below −10 °F with wind chill factors below −20 °F. This climate supports the Whiteout and Eagle glaciers surrounding the peak. The months May through June offer the most favorable weather for climbing or viewing this peak.

== See also ==
- Geography of Alaska
