= Rookery Nook =

Rookery Nook may refer to:

- Rookery Nook (novel), a 1923 novel by Ben Travers
- Rookery Nook (play), a 1926 play by Travers based on his own novel
- Rookery Nook (film), a 1930 British film adaptation of the play
- Rookery Nook (1953 TV drama), a 1953 British television production broadcast 'live'
- Rookery Nook (1970 TV drama), a 1970 British television production
