= Rook (surname) =

Rook is a surname. Notable people with the surname include:

- Ada Rook, Canadian musician
- Alan Rook (1909-1990), editor of the 1936 issue of New Oxford Poetry, one of the Cairo poets
- Chad Rook (born 1982 or 1983), Canadian actor
- Jean Rook (1931–1991), British newspaper columnist
- John Rook (1937-2016), American radio programmer
- Jerry Rook (1943-2019), American former professional basketball player
- Lori Rook, American politician
- Susan Rook (born 1961), journalist and photographer

== See also ==
- Rooks (surname)
