= Xwejni Bay =

Bay in Gozo, Malta

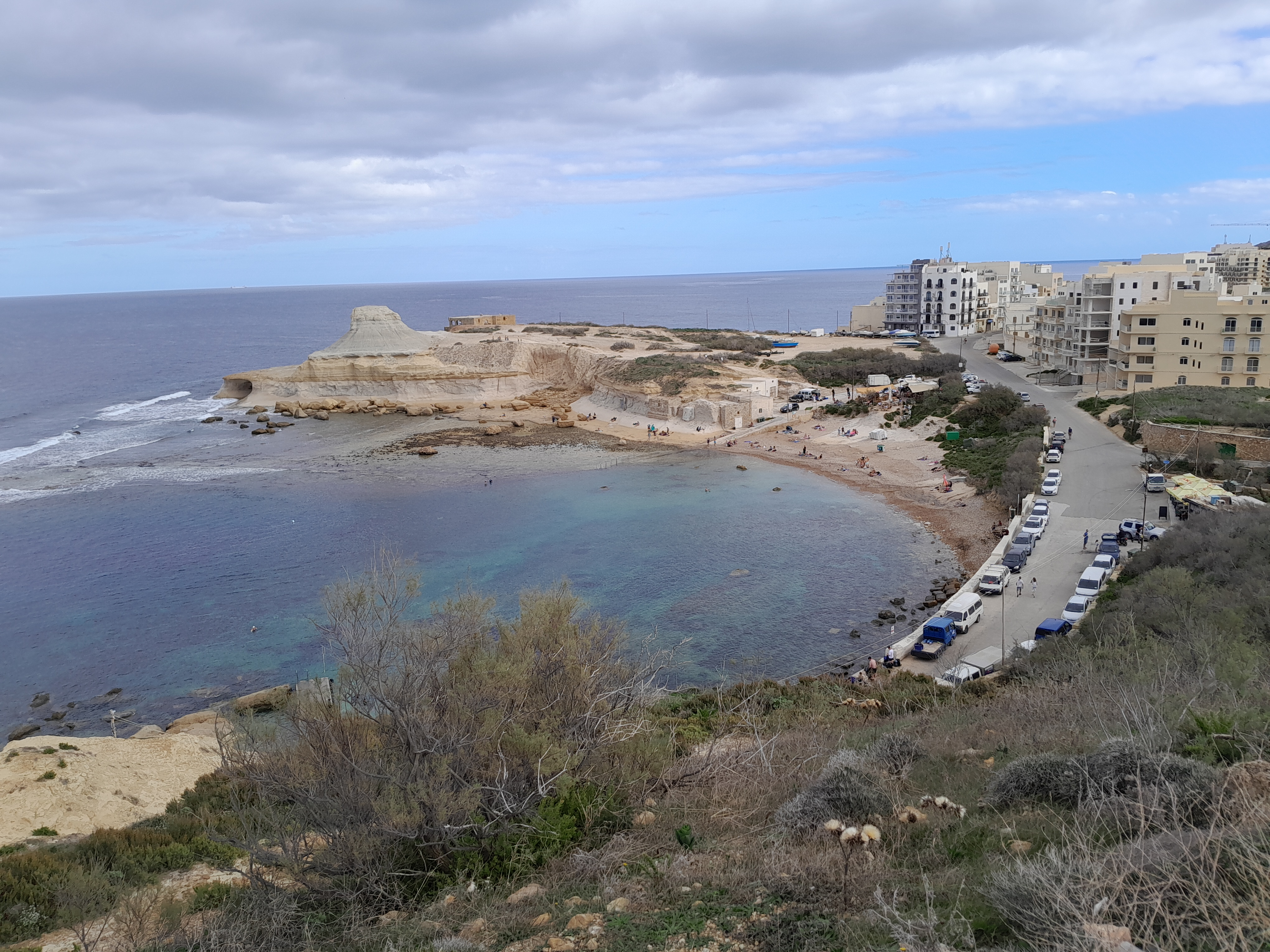
- Landscape of Xwenji Bay

- Location of the bay in Gozo, Malta
- Location: Malta
- Group: Mediterranean Sea
- Coordinates: 36.079°N 14.248°E
- Type: Bay
- Basin countries: Malta
- Surface elevation: 0 metres (0 ft)

Xwejni Bay (Maltese: Il-Bajja tax-Xwejni) is a bay located in the northern part of Gozo, Malta, within the limits of the village of Żebbuġ. It is used as a bathing bay and starting point for divers. The nearest place on the coast is Marsalforn. The bay has a small pebbly beach, and at the west end of the bay is an upstream plateau with a double arch and a cave along the coast.
