= Marsalforn =

Town in Gozo, Malta

- Town
- Motto: Tranquillitatis Planissimus
- Interactive map of Marsalforn
- Borders: Żebbuġ, Victoria, Xagħra

Area
  - Total: 0.21 km^{2} (0.08 sq mi)

Population
  - Total: 750
  - Estimate (n/a): 500 to 1,000
- Demonym(s): Marsalforni (m), Marsalfornija (f), Marsalfornin (pl)
- Time zone: UTC+ 1 (CET)
  - Summer (DST): + 2
- Postal code: MFN
- Area code: 356

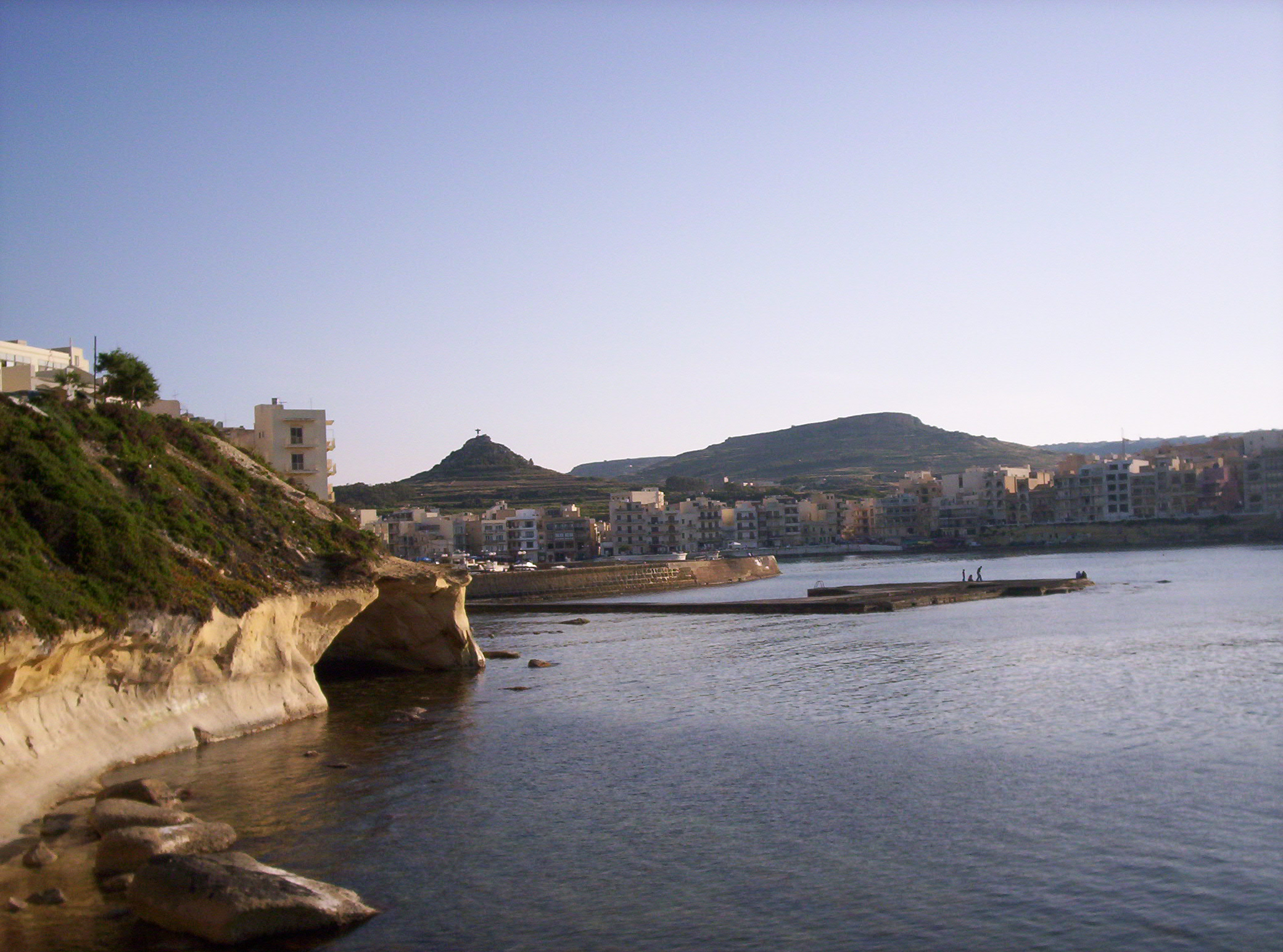
Marsalforn

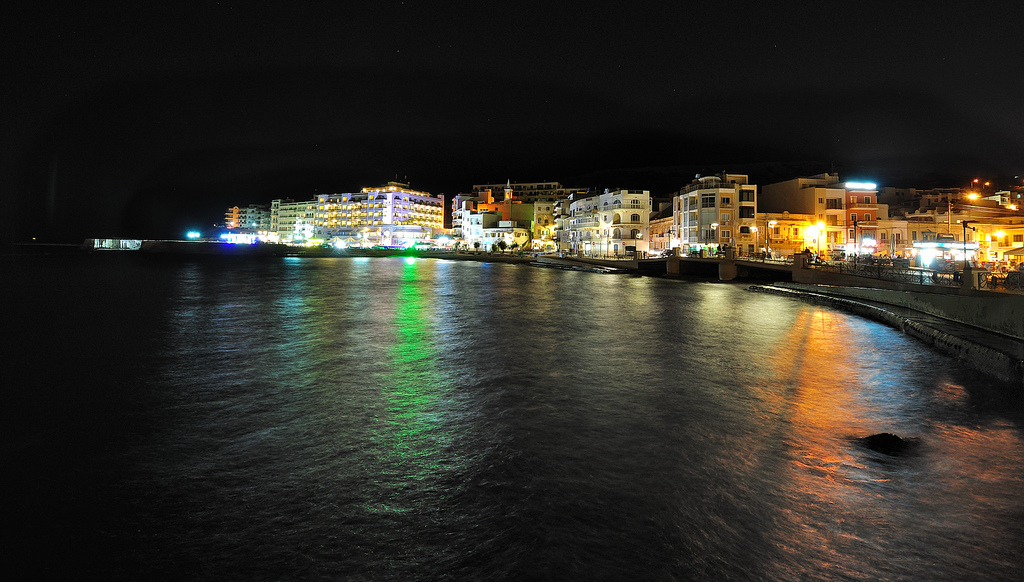
Bay of Marsalforn at night

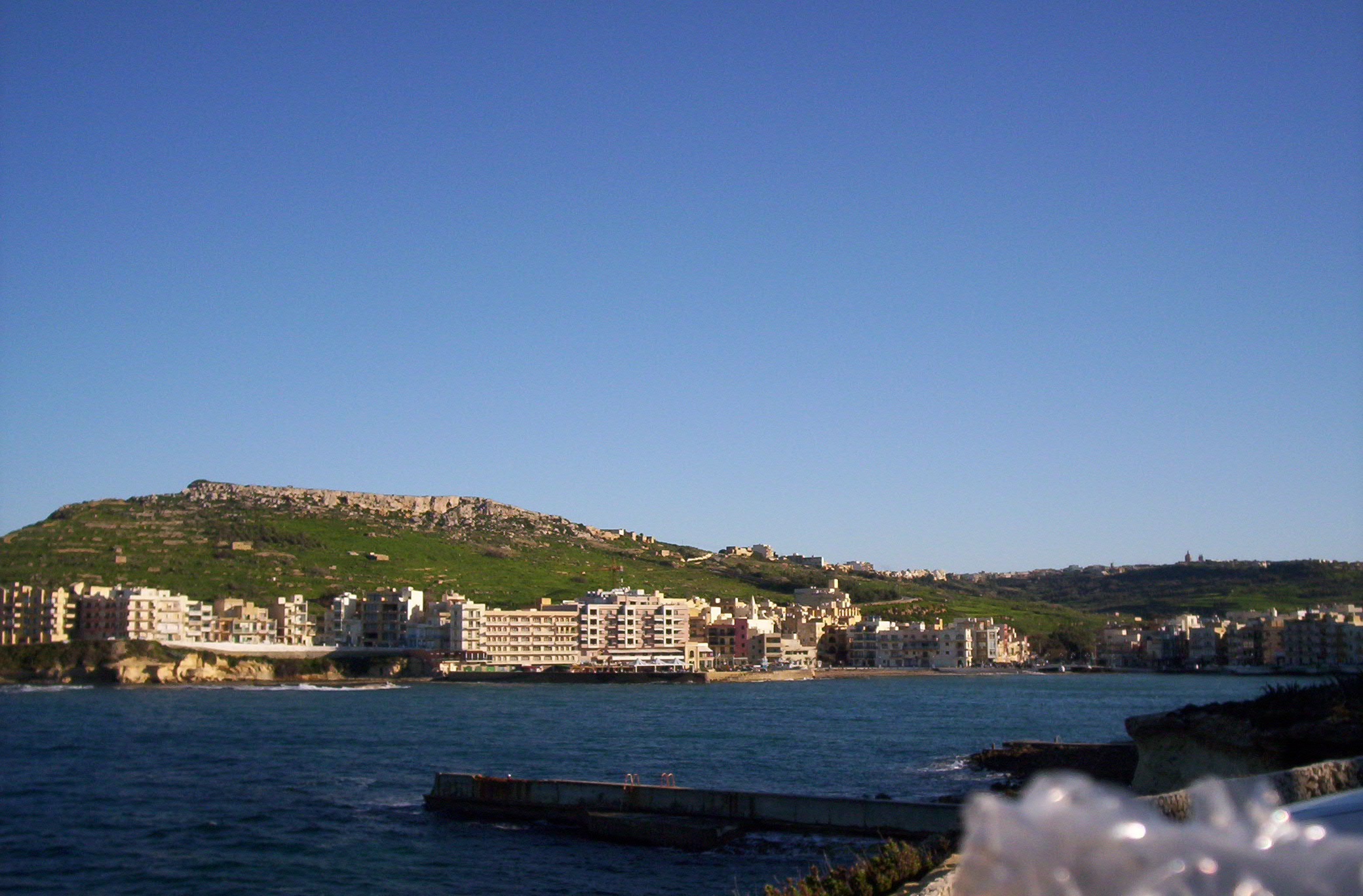

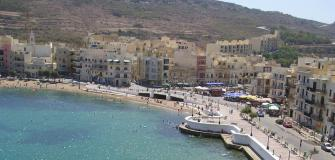
Sea front

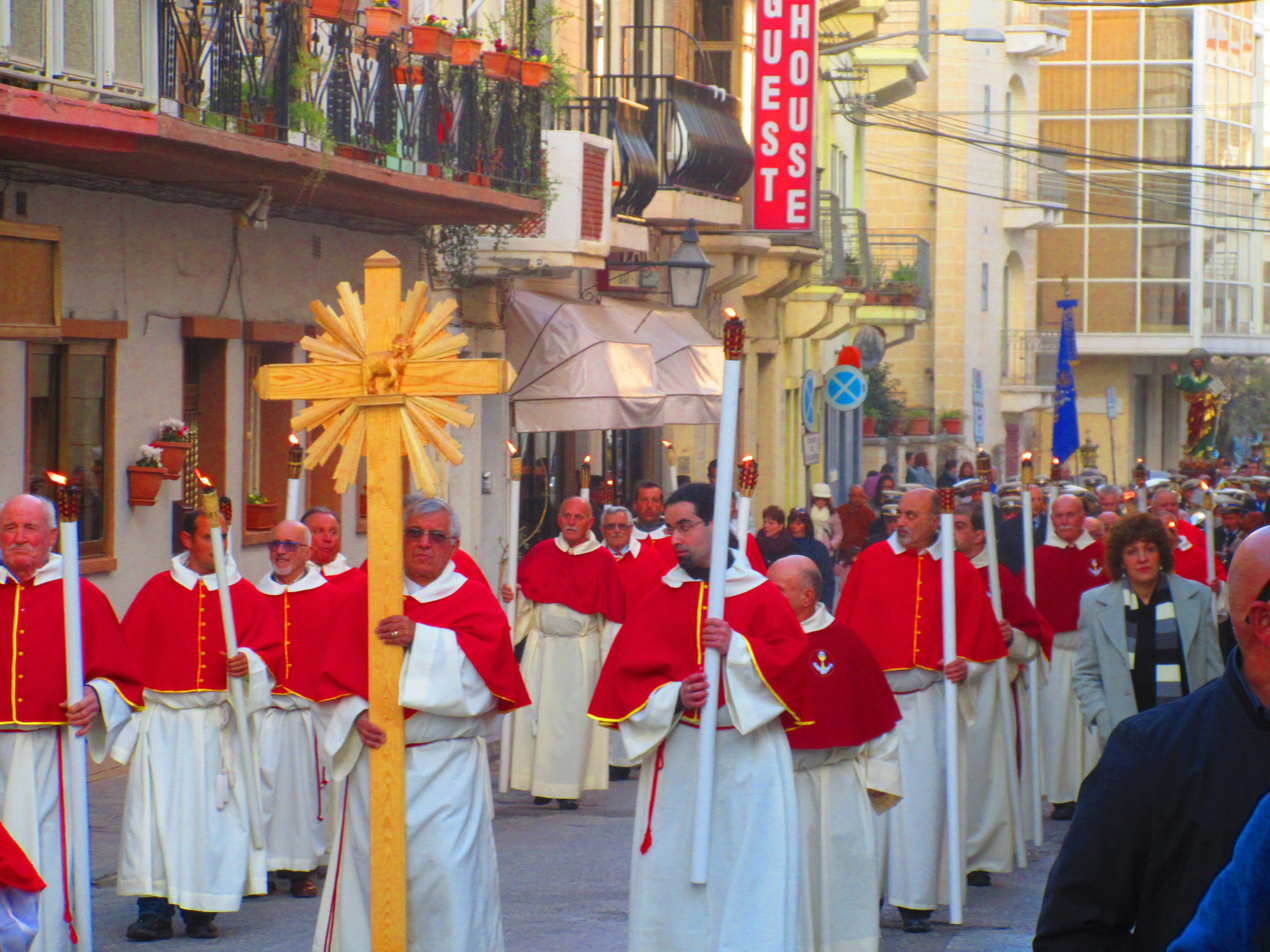
St. Paul's Shipwreck Feast

Marsalforn (pronounced: Mars al-Forn), also written as M'Forn for shortcut purposes, is a town on the north coast of Gozo, the second largest island of the Maltese archipelago. The town lies between the hilltop towns of Xagħra and Żebbuġ. Associated with this town is the bay of Qbajjar. The town is part of the Żebbuġ local council.

Marsalforn is one of the most popular tourist resorts on Gozo. It is well served by hotels, guest houses, restaurants, bars, and beaches. There is only a small sandy beach in Marsalforn. However, along the rocky coastline are a number of interesting swimming spots.

== Public structures ==
- a Roman Catholic church
- a police station
- a main bus stop along with several minor bus stops
- 7 diving centers
- a hotel, a guesthouse and many apartments for rent
- 20 restaurants
- 6 shops and supermarkets
- 2 bays, including Qbajjar

== Nature ==
- a major sandy beach and some swimming spots
- a public garden and a park

== Name ==
Marsalforn is a composite word. "Marsa" is an Arabic word meaning "port" or "bay". There is disagreement on the origin of the second part of the word - "forn". "Forn means "bakery" in Maltese and Arabic, but it is highly improbable that this has anything to do with Marsalforn, for it is unlikely that a bakery would be built in an area with a small population. It is likely that this name, like that of other Gozitan ports, might refer to a type of ship. In that case, it would derive from "liburna", an Illyrian type of ship, which became "livurna" in Greek, and "lifurna" in Arabic. The name may also derive from "forna", a word used by Gozitan fishermen to refer to "a cave hollowed out by the sea". There are several of these in Marsalforn, the best known being Għar Qawqla, "the cave at the steep hill".

== Emblem ==
The emblem of Marsalforn consists of a blue shield representing Marsalforn harbour, encircled by a golden border. Saint Paul, according to tradition, left for Rome, after his shipwreck, from Marsalforn; hence the emblem of Saint Paul: a viper encircling the sword. The viper refers to the episode involving Saint Paul just after his shipwreck on Malta as recorded in the Acts of the Apostles.

== Geography ==
To the south of Marsalforn is a fertile valley named after the town. The valley is bounded by several hillocks and used to be known as the "haven of hillocks". The most famous of these is tas-Salvatur (Our Saviours Hill) also referred locally as Tal-Merzuq Hill (Ray of Light) due to the legends surrounding it, recorded by Giovanni Abela in the seventeenth century.

This volcano-like hill has acquired the attention of the people since 1901, when a large wooden cross was erected on its peak. Three years later, when Gozo was consecrated to Christ the Saviour, a stone statue of Christ replaced the cross. This was in turn replaced by a gigantic concrete statue towering twelve metres above the hill, which remains to this day.

As recorded in the Acts of the Apostles, Paul the Apostle was shipwrecked in Malta, but legend maintains that it was from Marsalforn that he embarked for Sicily and Rome. Today, this legend is symbolised by the town's emblem, which consists of a viper encircling a sword. This refers to an episode involving Saint Paul when he remained unharmed after being bit by a viper. The town church of "Saint Paul Shipwreck" is also dedicated to the memory of Saint Paul's departure from Marsalforn. The church, originally raised in the fourteenth century, has been rebuilt and enlarged many times. The foundation stone of the present church was laid in 1730. The feast is celebrated on 10 February every year.

To the west, over a small headland, lies a smaller bay, Qbajjar.

== History ==
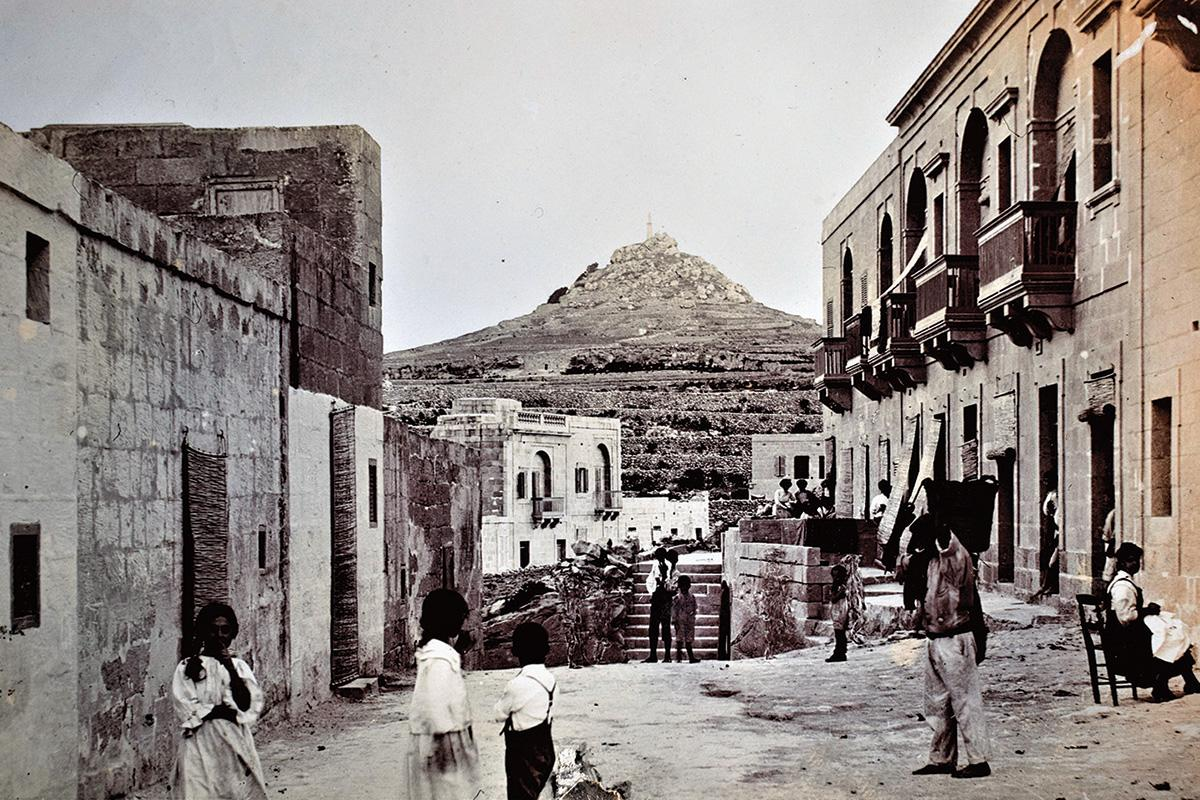
Merzuq Hill from Marsalforn, 1920s

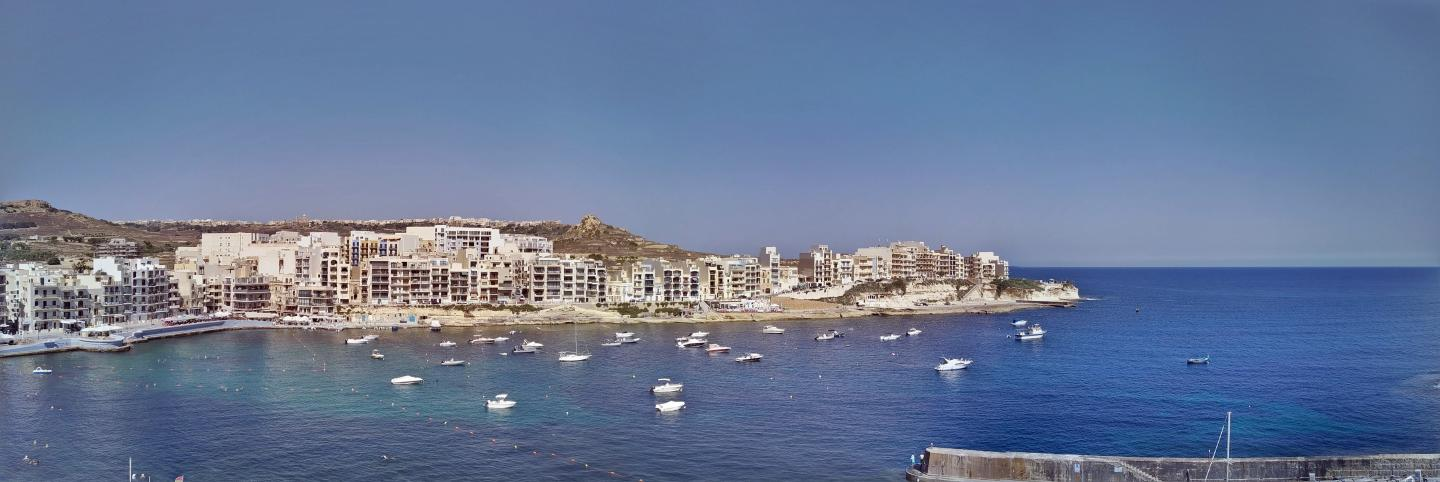
Panorama of Marsalforn sea front

=== Early history ===
Marsalforn dates back to Roman times. Until the sixteenth century, the port was the most important in Gozo. Imported food supplies from Sicily were unloaded at Marsalforn, and it was from there that passengers boarded to travel to Licata in Sicily and other continental ports.

=== Sixteenth to seventeenth century ===
By the late sixteenth and early seventeenth centuries the Knights of the Order of Saint John, the rulers of Malta at the time, considered abandoning the old Citadel in the centre of the island and building a new town overlooking the port. Hostility from the Gozitan people meant that the plans were never realised. They protested that they were too poor to pay the extra tax needed to finance the move and the disruption caused by the transfer of their homes from Victoria to Marsalforn would be too great.

Marsalforn's church, St Paul's Church, was built in 1730. It was restored in 1939.

With the development of Mġarr harbour, Marsalforn lost its importance and for several centuries, it remained a quiet fishing town inhabited by a small community of fishermen and their families.

=== Modern history ===
During the siege of Malta, on 12 April 1942, Marsalforn was hit by several bombs.

On 19 May 2019, the Ministry for Gozo installed a WWII memorial commemorating the attack on Marsalforn on 3 March 1942.

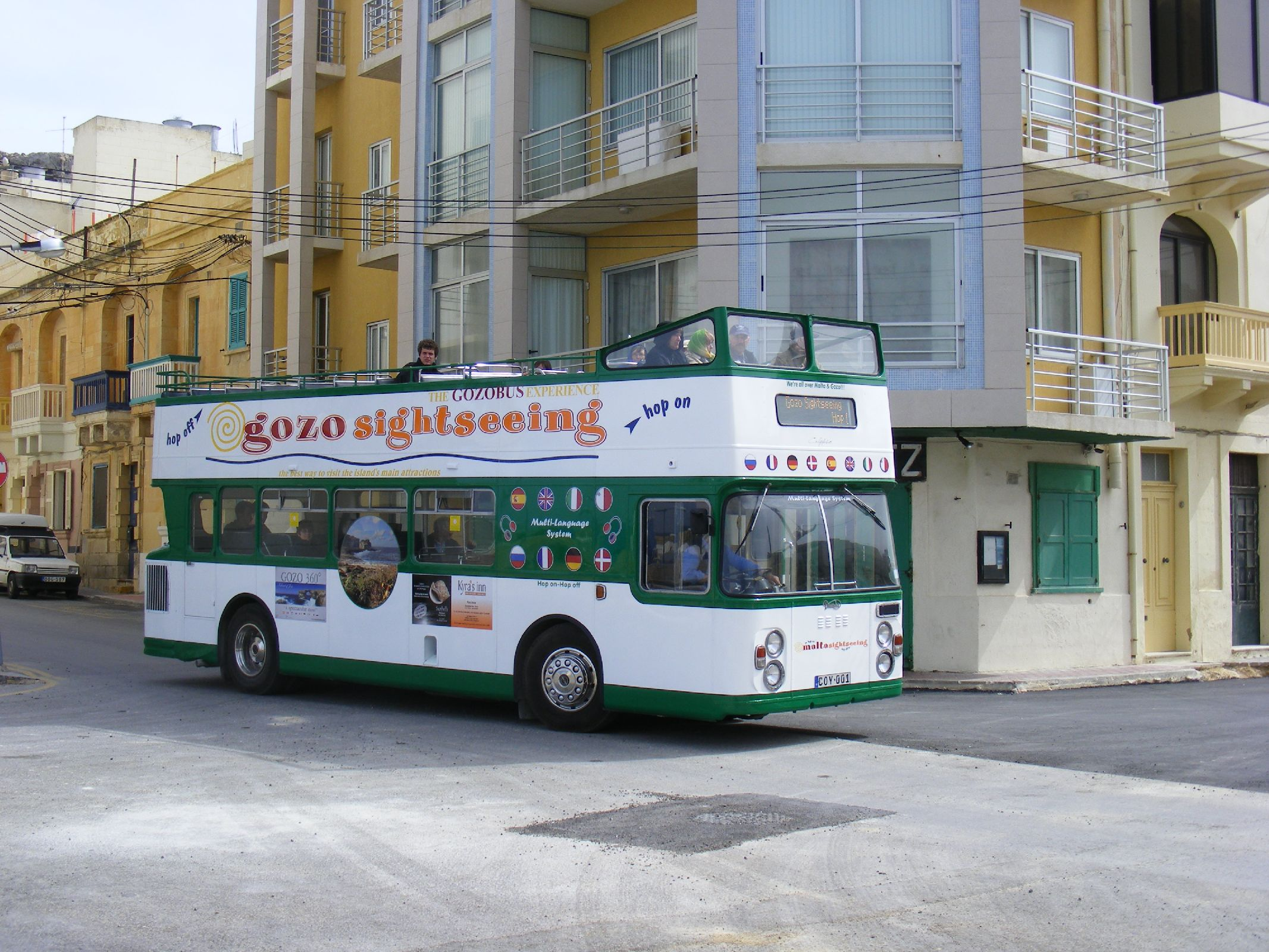
Gozo sightseeing bus in Marsalforn

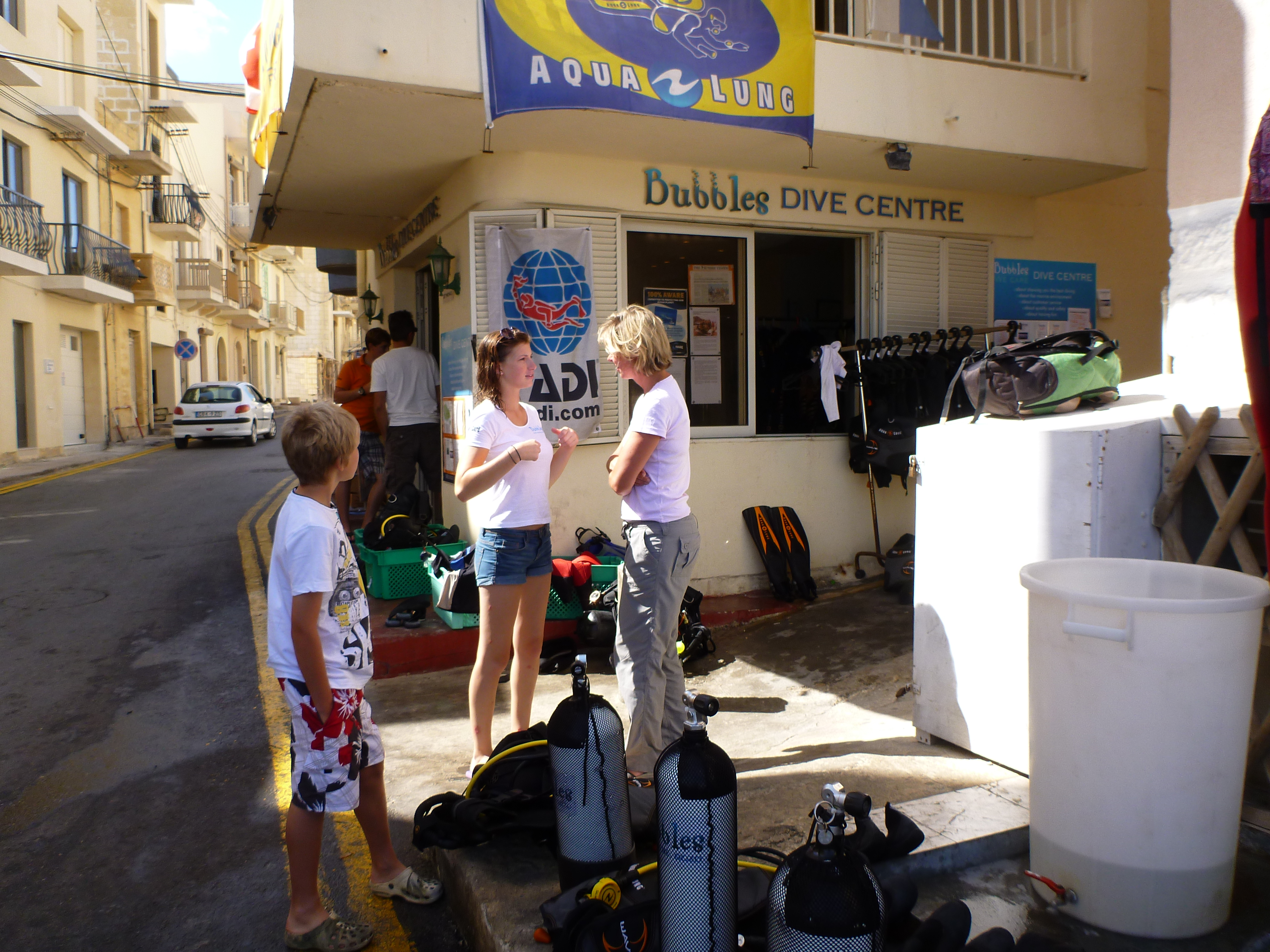
One of many scuba diving schools in the town

== Economy ==
The growth in the twentieth century of tourism on the Maltese island has led to a redirection of the town's economic function away from fishing. Today, although fishing remains an important industry, increasingly tourism is becoming the dominant source of employment for the local people. In the last thirty years the town has seen considerable urban expansion and has gradually extended along the crescent-shaped rocky bay towards Qbajjar. This expansion has been spurred by the growth in tourism in Gozo which has meant that several hotels, guesthouses and apartments have been built in the town. Moreover, the desire by wealthy Maltese and Gozitans for second homes in the town, combined with the increasingly large presence of foreign investors in the local housing market, has fuelled high demand for property in the town. It has also meant that the old palazzini that Marsalforn was noted for have been sacrificed and in their stead apartment blocks have been built.

One effect of tourism has been the establishment of clear tangible seasonal changes in the town's character. During the winter months, when tourist numbers are low and second homes are frequently not used, the town gains a quiet, peaceful feel. During summer, the town is a busy, vibrant place, teeming with both local and foreign visitors.

The town has also become the premiere diving centre in Gozo, with several scuba diving schools located on the sea front.

== Demographics ==
Historically, the town might have always had less than a thousand residents, due to historical invasions occurring in the town and the migration of locals to other towns in Gozo and Malta in search of better job opportunities, while eventually settling in those towns.

The town might currently have around 500 to 1,000 permanent residents, with the Maltese people being the largest ethnic group, although no official statistics are provided as Marsalforn forms part of the locality of Żebbuġ.

=== Immigrant population ===
The town is one of the most multicultural spots in Gozo, with foreigners likely to form nearly half of all the town's residents.

The main foreign groups include Britons, Italians, Serbs, Germans and Libyans. The town is also home to the largest African community as a percentage of the total population in Gozo.

It is also very likely that the tourists who come during the summer season, who are predominantly foreign, can form a significant majority of the town's total temporary and permanent population between the months of June and September, as Marsalforn's population can increase by hundreds in a matter of hours during the day.

=== Religion ===
The town is predominantly Roman Catholic, like the rest of the towns in Gozo, although no official statistics are provided. The town might also have a significant immigrant Muslim community.

== Administrative committee ==
The committee members are responsible for all administrative matters regarding Marsalforn. Current Marsalforn committee members:

- Diane Tagliaferro - executive secretary
- Maria Saliba - chairperson
- Frank Fenech - chairperson Deputy
- Martin Cefai - member
- Sandra Grech - member
- Joseph Zammit - member
