= Marsalforn Bay =

Bay in Malta

Coordinates: 36°04′22″N 14°15′34″E

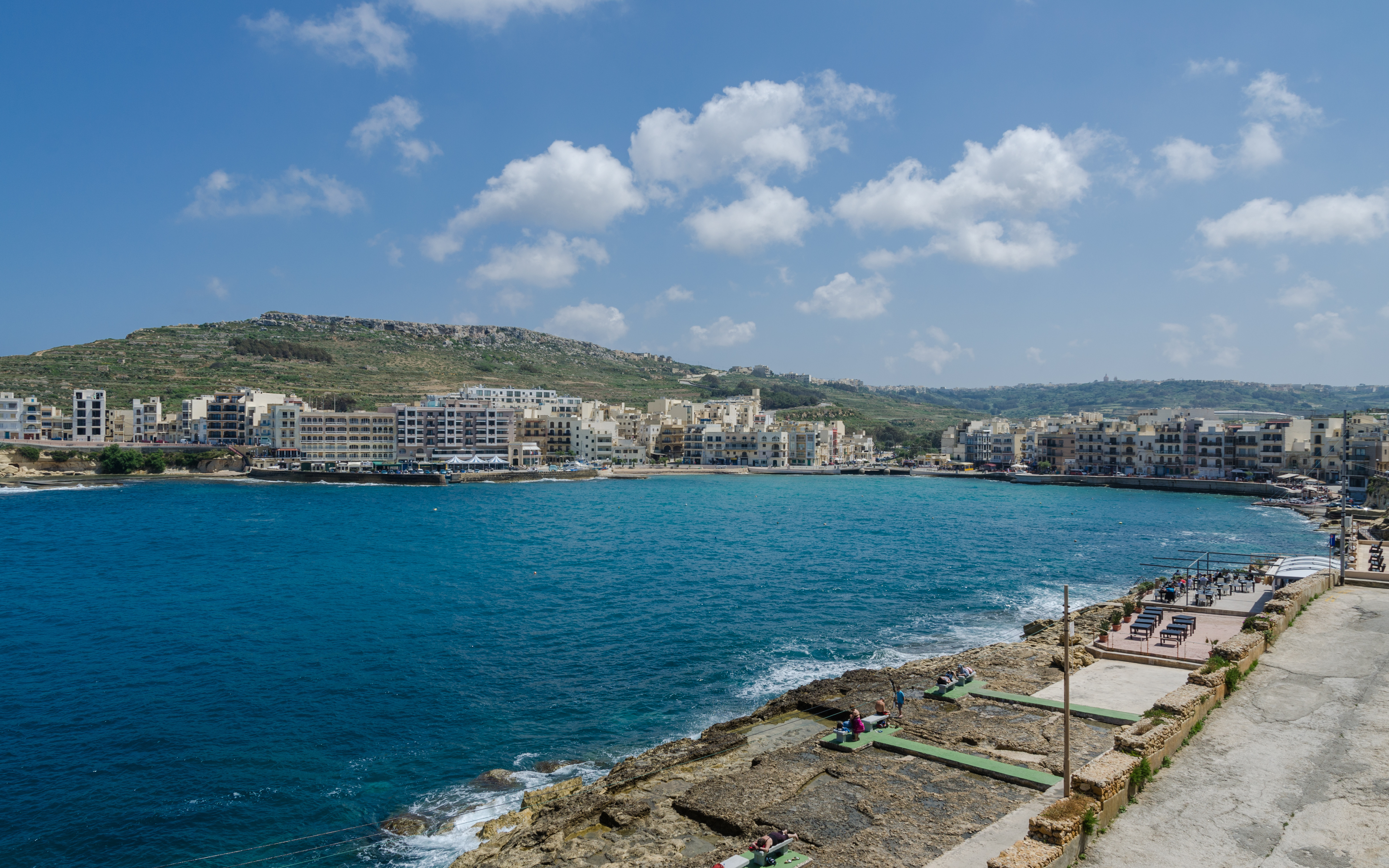
- A view of Marsalforn Bay
- Location: Malta
- Group: Mediterranean Sea
- Type: Bay
- Surface elevation: 0 metres (0 ft)

Marsalforn Bay (Maltese: Il-Bajja ta' Marsalforn) is a bay located in Marsalforn, Gozo, in the Maltese archipelago in the Mediterranean Sea.
