= Żebbuġ, Gozo =

Żebbuġ Iż-Żebbuġ
- Local council
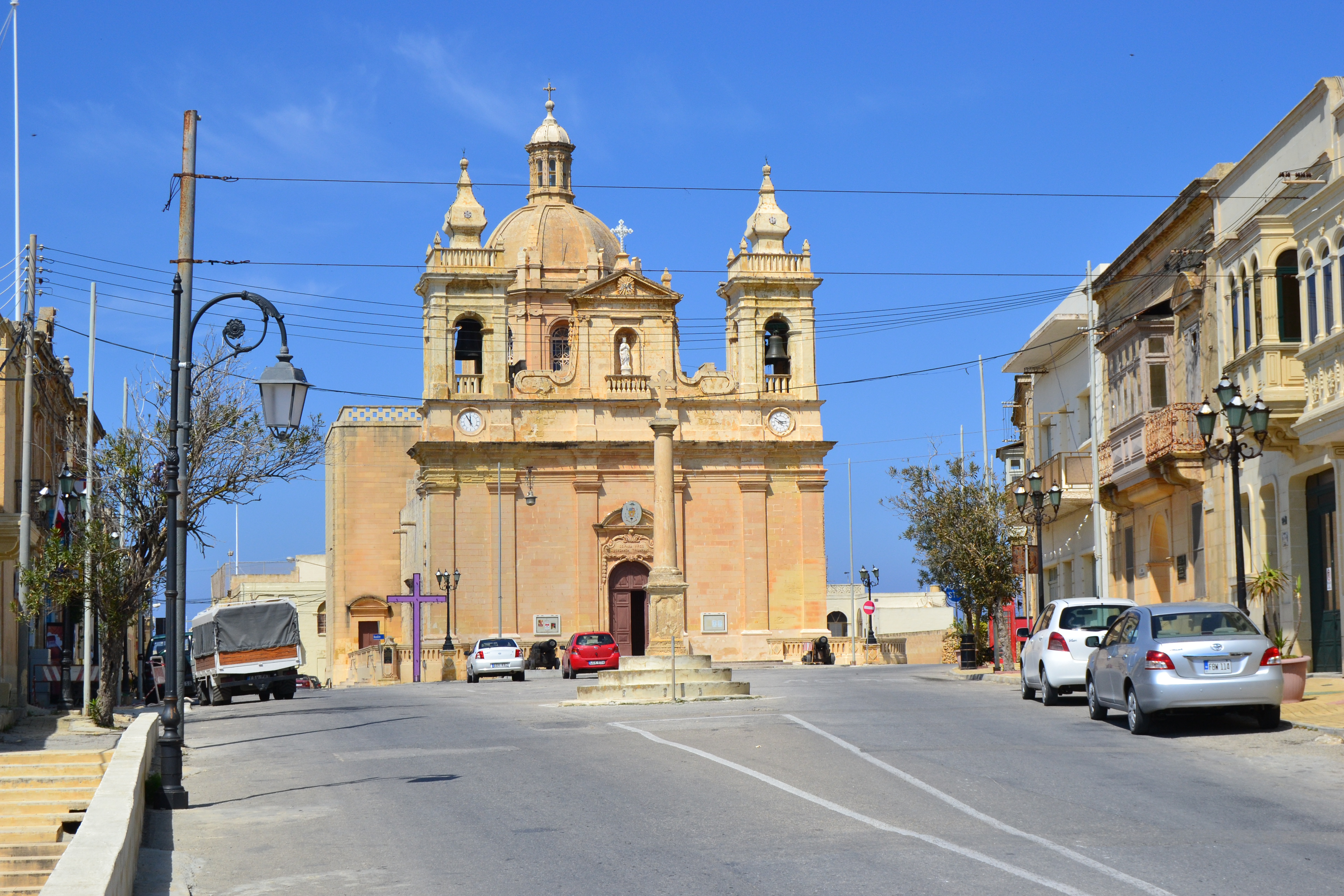
- Parish church and square of Żebbuġ

- Flag Coat of arms
- Motto: Terra Sublimis (A lofty region)
- Coordinates: 36°04′15″N 14°14′13″E
- Country: Malta
- Region: Gozo Region
- District: Gozo and Comino District
- Established: c. 13th century
- Borders: Għasri, Victoria, Xagħra

Government
  - Mayor: Baskal Saliba (PN)

Area
  - Total: 7.6 km^{2} (2.9 sq mi)

Population (July 2024)
  - Total: 3,688
  - Density: 490/km^{2} (1,300/sq mi)
- Demonym(s): Żebbuġi t'Għawdex (m), Żebbuġija t'Għawdex (f), Żebbuġin t'Għawdex (pl)
- Time zone: UTC+1 (CET)
  - Summer (DST): UTC+2 (CEST)
- Postal code: ZBB
- Dialing code: 356
- ISO 3166 code: MT-65
- Patron saint: Assumption of Mary
- Day of festa: Sunday after 15 August
- Website: Official website

Żebbuġ (Maltese: Iż-Żebbuġ) is a village and an administrative unit of Malta, in the northwest coast of the island of Gozo. It is located close to Għarb and Għasri and is built on two hilltop plateaus, Ta' Abram and Ix-Xagħra taż-Żebbuġ. The fishing port and tourist resort of Marsalforn lies within the Żebbuġ Council. The population of Żebbuġ was 3,688 in July 2024. This included 2,076 males and 1,612 females; 1,948 Maltese nationals and 1,740 foreign nationals. This makes it the fifth largest in Gozo, after Xewkija.

With an area of 7.6 km^{2}, Żebbuġ is the largest local council in Gozo by land area. The word Żebbuġ means "wild olive trees", a crop for which the village used to be noted, although nowadays very few olive trees remain on the slopes of Żebbuġ. The village is also well known for its fine lacework and its nearby coastal beauty spots.

== History ==
The areas around Żebbuġ have been inhabited for millennia. There are Bronze Age remains on Ta' Kuljat hill, and even older remains can be found to the north, close to Qbajjar Bay. Punic tombs were also found at Qbajjar.

Over the following centuries, the area was inhabited only by a few farmers. A community began to take shape in the 13th century, and eventually a small chapel was built.

In 1643, plans were made to build a fortified city in Marsalforn, to serve as Gozo's capital instead of the ancient Cittadella, but the project was eventually abandoned due to a lack of funds.

The parish of Żebbuġ, which is dedicated to the Assumption of Mary (Maltese: Santa Marija), was established on 28 April 1688 by bishop Davide Cocco Palmieri. The village's parish church is the oldest one in Gozo, apart from St George's basilica (1678) and the cathedral (1714) in Victoria.

From 1715 onwards, a chain of fortifications were built along the Żebbuġ coastline, especially at Marsalforn. Most of these have been destroyed over the years, with the only surviving vestige being Qolla l-Bajda Battery between Qbajjar and Xwejni Bays.

In 1738, deposits of calcite travertine (referred to locally as alabaster, or, though it is related to neither, as 'onyx marble' on account of its banded appearance when cut) were discovered in a field known as Taċ-Ċaqra or Is-Sagħtrija. The travertine was used to decorate the interior of the parish church of Żebbuġ, as well as in some other churches in Gozo and Malta.

== Places of interest ==
- Parish Church of the Assumption of Mary – Originally built as a chapel in 1644, replaced by a church built between 1690 and 1726. It was further enlarged between 1938 and 1942.
- Qolla l-Bajda Battery – a coastal battery built in around 1716. It is one of two surviving examples on Gozo.
- Rih id-Deheb - a refined historical house and museum featuring paintings, drawings, sculpture, applied art, folklore, antiques and naturalia, all in the ancient, venerable tradition of the "wunderkammer".

== Żebbuġ main roads ==
- Triq Għajn Melel (Għajn Melel Street)
- Triq il-Knisja (Church Street)
- Triq il-Ponta (Point Street)
- Triq iż-Żebbuġ (Żebbuġ Street)

== Twin towns – sister cities ==
Żebbuġ is twinned with:

- Maletto, Italy
