= Marry the Girl (play) =

Tom Walls (Hugh) cross examines Ralph Lynn (Wally)

Marry the Girl is a farce by George Arthurs and Arthur Miller. It was one of the series of Aldwych farces that ran at the Aldwych Theatre in London nearly continuously from 1923 to 1933. The play centres on a breach of promise case brought before a British court of justice.

The piece opened on 24 November 1930 and ran until 16 May 1931, a total of 195 performances. The actor-manager Tom Walls, who presented the farces and co-starred in most of them, gathered a regular company of players for the series. All the chief members of the company took part in Marry the Girl. A film adaptation of the play was made in 1935 under the same title.

== Background ==
Marry the Girl was the eighth of the twelve Aldwych farces, and only the second not written by Ben Travers. The first four in the series, It Pays to Advertise, A Cuckoo in the Nest, Rookery Nook and Thark had long runs, averaging more than 400 performances each. The next three were less outstandingly successful, with progressively shorter runs: Plunder (1928) ran for 344 performances, A Cup of Kindness (1929) for 291, and A Night Like This (1930), 267.

Like its predecessors, the play was directed by Tom Walls, who co-starred with Ralph Lynn, a specialist in playing "silly ass" characters. The regular company of supporting actors included Robertson Hare, who played a figure of harassed respectability; Mary Brough in eccentric old lady roles; Ethel Coleridge as the severe voice of authority; Winifred Shotter as the sprightly young female lead; and the saturnine Gordon James.

== Original cast ==
- Banks – George Barrett
- Jane Elliott – Doreen Bendix
- Mrs Elliott – Ethel Coleridge
- Walford Gibbs – Ralph Lynn
- Mrs Chattaway – Mary Brough
- Cyril Chattaway – Denis O'Neil
- Hugh Delafield – Tom Walls
- Doris Chattaway – Winifred Shotter
- Sergeant Burrows – Philip Carlton
- Sir Anthony Plumstead – Gordon James
- Mr Justice Sparrowhawk – Robertson Hare
- Mervyn Parkes – Archibald Batty

== Synopsis ==
Act I – Wally Gibbs's rooms in Staple Inn. Afternoon

Wally hopes to marry Jane Elliott. He seeks Mrs Elliott's approval, which she gives, though shrewdly assessing his playboy character. When Wally is alone, Mrs Chattaway is shown in. She accuses him of playing fast and loose with the affections of her daughter Doris. He admits that they have been on romantic terms, but denies that he ever asked Doris to marry him. Mrs Chattaway departs, threatening him with an action for breach of promise. Wally's best friend, Hugh, arrives. He is a barrister, but not a prosperous one, preferring to go to the races than appear in court. Unlike the equally idle Wally he has no private income. He too loves Jane, but magnanimously congratulates his friend on being the victor in the contest for her love.

Wally tells Hugh about Mrs Chattaway's threats. The solution, he feels, is for Hugh to charm Doris and lure her affections away from Wally. He emphasises that Doris is a very attractive and genuinely nice young woman. Hugh reluctantly agrees. They spin Doris a yarn that he is desolate after a broken engagement and in need of consolation. He borrows Wally's car to take her for a drive in the country.

Act II – The same, the next morning

Mrs Chattaway intrudes again, accompanied by her son. Doris has not been home overnight, and they accuse of Wally of abducting her. He allows them to search his rooms, and they depart, threatening to call in the police. Hugh and Doris enter. While they were having dinner in a country pub Wally's car was stolen. It was too late to come back to London by train, and they took a room each at the pub. Wally is greatly agitated, expressing concern for Doris's reputation. It is clear that she will suffer at the hands of her bullying mother if it emerges that she has been out overnight with a man she has just met. Mrs Chattaway returns; they try to bluff things out, but a police inspector arrives to report the finding of Wally's car. He hands over a vanity bag found in the vehicle, which Mrs Chattaway recognises as Doris's. She assumes it was Wally, not Hugh, who took Doris for a ride. Jane enters, encounters Doris, and leaps to the same conclusion as Mrs Chattaway. She breaks off the engagement and leaves.

Hugh's brother-in-law, a prosperous solicitor to whom he owes money, arrives in search of him. He insists that Hugh should accept a lucrative brief to appear for the plaintiff in a breach of promise case. Hugh looks at the brief and announces in dismay that the plaintiff's name is Doris Chattaway.

Act III – The Law Courts

Before the trial begins Wally and Doris confer privately. Each expresses a warm regard for the other, and it is clear that the case has been brought entirely under pressure from Mrs Chattaway. The trial begins, presided over by a judge who makes dreadful jokes throughout. Hugh outlines the case against Wally, painting a deeply unflattering picture of his character.

Cross-examined, Wally says that though he never proposed marriage to Doris he might have done had it not been for her mother. Hugh reads aloud from some of Wally's love letters to Doris, which are so twee as to have Wally cowering below the top of the witness box from embarrassment. Hugh and Wally engage in mutual acrimony that verges on contempt of court. Wally announces to the court in general and Hugh in particular that he did not realise how much Doris meant to him until the night Hugh took her away.

The judge tries to restore order, but is shouted down by Wally and Hugh. Wally proposes in open court to Doris, who accepts; Hugh counters by revealing that he has married Jane. The hullabaloo in court engulfs the hapless judge and even the incandescent Mrs Chattaway, as each character expresses his or her enthusiasm or outrage.

== Critical reception ==
There was a general view among the critics that although the third act was exceptionally funny, the first two were slow, with some good comic scenes but also quite a lot of not particularly amusing exposition of the plot. The Times said, "But the Court scene, though it could make no claim to originality, was good fun from beginning to end. Mr Hare, as the presiding Judge, had the best of it but the inanity of Mr Lynn in the witness box was extremely felicitous." The Illustrated London News predicted a run of more than 100 nights, but "the credit for this will be due to the actors rather than the authors, who have not been lavish in their wit or in inventing notably original or humorous situations". The paper added that the last act was extremely funny and sent the audience from the theatre shaking with laughter.

== Adaptations ==
The play was filmed in 1935. Marry the Girl was unlike the nine earlier film versions of the Aldwych series in several respects: it was made by a different company (British Lion Films rather than British & Dominions Film Corporation and Gaumont British); it was not directed by Walls, who had directed eight of the first nine; and neither Walls, Lynn nor Hare featured in it: the only member of the original stage cast who appeared was Winifred Shotter, reprising her stage role as Doris.
