= Fifty-Fifty (play) =

English farcical play

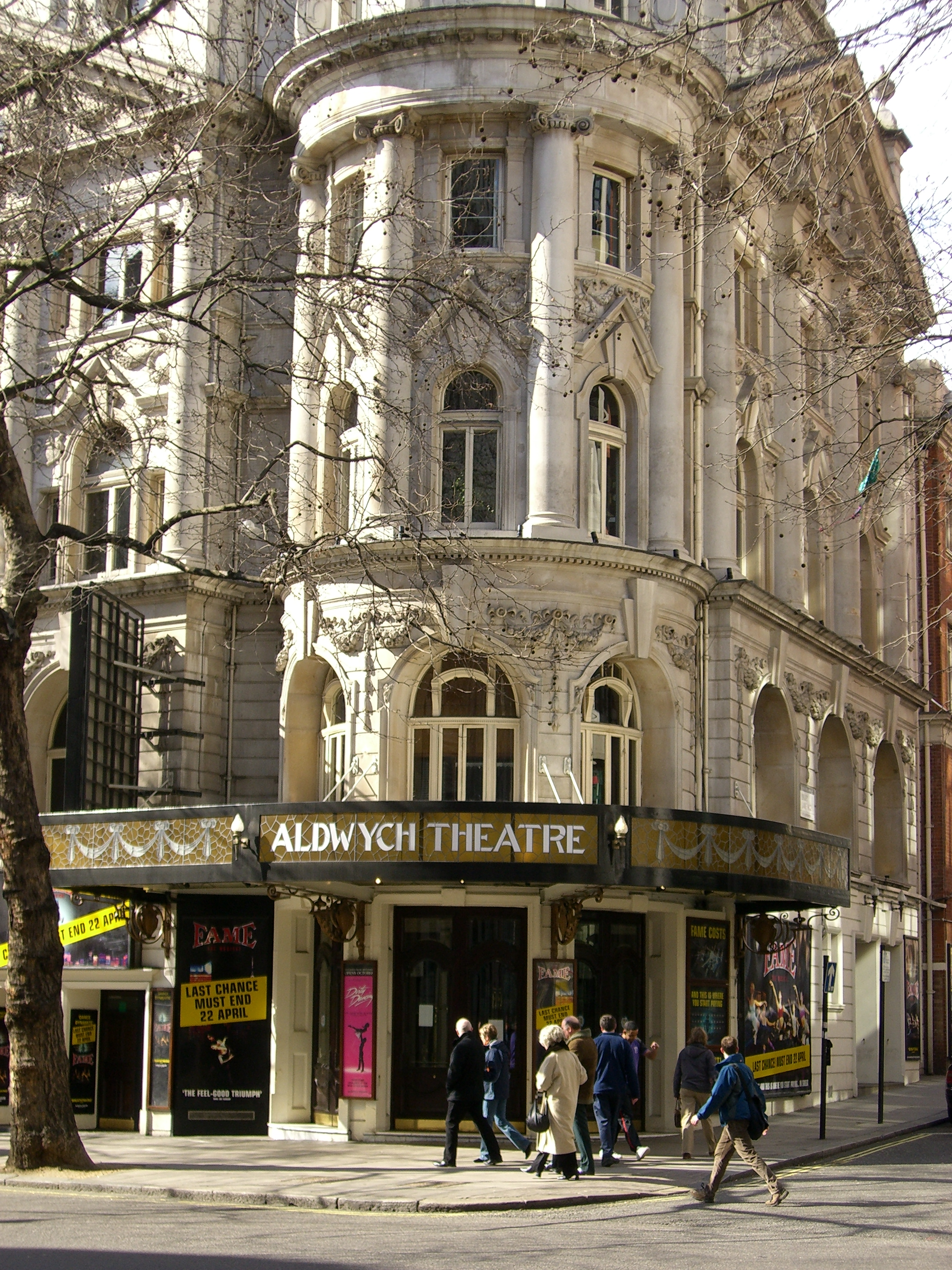
Aldwych Theatre in 2006

Fifty-Fifty is a farce by H. F. Maltby, adapted from a French original, Azaïs, by Louis Verneuil and Georges Berr. It was the penultimate work of the series of Aldwych farces that ran nearly continuously at the Aldwych Theatre in London from 1923 to 1933. The play centres on the sudden rise of an impoverished music teacher to become manager of a grand casino.

The piece opened on 5 September 1932 and ran until 21 January 1933, a total of 161 performances. A film adaptation was made in 1933 under the title Just My Luck.

== Background ==
Fifty-Fifty was the eleventh in the series of twelve Aldwych farces. The first four in the series, It Pays to Advertise, A Cuckoo in the Nest, Rookery Nook and Thark had long runs, averaging more than 400 performances each. Subsequent productions had been less outstandingly successful, and the decision of the producer, Tom Walls, not to appear in the previous play, Dirty Work had disappointed audiences who had relished his stage chemistry with his co-star Ralph Lynn.

Three of the familiar favourites in the Aldwych team took roles in the new production alongside Lynn: Robertson Hare, a figure of harassed respectability, Mary Brough, famous for her eccentric old ladies, and Winifred Shotter, the leading lady. The public had grown used to farces written specially for the company by Ben Travers, and critics noted that the parts in the new piece were not tailor-made for Hare and Brough as Travers's characters always were. The play had already been seen in London in Maltby's translation, in a production at the Strand Theatre in 1929. On that occasion it was given under the title Azaïs and was less anglicised than the version presented at the Aldwych. One member of the Strand cast was recruited for the Aldwych production, Clive Morton, who reprised his character, the Viscount de Langeais, though renamed La Coste.

== Original Aldwych cast ==
- Montague Trigg – Robertson Hare
- Francis – Gordon James
- Lady Croft – Maidie Hope
- Peggy Croft – Winifred Shotter
- Sir Charles Croft – Morris Harvey
- David Blake – Ralph Lynn
- Signor Stromboli – Frederick Burtwell
- Typist – Joan Brierley
- Madame Heffer – Mary Brough
- Attendant – Cameron Carr
- Vicomte La Coste – Clive Morton
- Countess Romani – Dorothy Boyd
- Pan Osnar Rizzi – R Cameron Hall

== Synopsis ==
Azaïs, the French philosopher, postulated that happiness and misery are equally balanced. This "fifty-fifty" theory is a great comfort to David Blake. Blake is a penurious music teacher, aged thirty-five; he feels that having spent the first half of his threescore years and ten in poverty and unhappiness, Azaïs' principle should mean that his remaining years ought to be comfortable and happy. He greatly envies Stromboli, a man of his own age who has never known failure and is full of self-confidence. Buoyed up by the thought that, according to Azaïs, the roles are due to be reversed for the next thirty-five years, he spends what little money he has on a new suit, shaves off his scrubby moustache, transforming his appearance from pitiable to debonair. He impresses the impetuous entrepreneur Sir Charles Croft, owner of the casino and hotel in St Nectare, who engages him at sight to run it.

Blake is beset by a gallery of strange characters. Stromboli does indeed find his fortune on the wane, and his confidence ebbs and his sweet nature comes to the fore just as Blake is becoming overweening. The old woman who lives next door is enraged when Blake makes a success of the casino, disturbing her peace. One of the residents is a young aristocrat in love with Peggy, Croft's daughter, and tormented by amorous visions caused by the gurgle of her bathwater in the adjoining suite. Sir Charles is enamoured of a revue star. His wife is so irritated by his roving eye that she writes herself love letters from imaginary admirers in a successful attempt to bring him to heel. Croft's secretary is plotting Blake's downfall, and eventually secures the managership for himself. Throughout all this, Peggy has been quietly in love with Blake, and at the conclusion they are united.

== Critical reception ==
The critics praised the players but thought little of the play. Ivor Brown in The Manchester Guardian commented that to call it an Aldwych farce was a misnomer, and there was a consensus that the piece was too slow and too weak. The Illustrated London News observed, "The Aldwych authors have taught us to expect a laugh in every line, but Mr. H. F. Maltby, probably ill at ease in adapting this play from the French, was not his usual witty self." Brown thought that the weakness of the story "seems to inhibit the natural vitality of the Aldwych team."
