= A Bit of a Test =

Play by Ben Travers

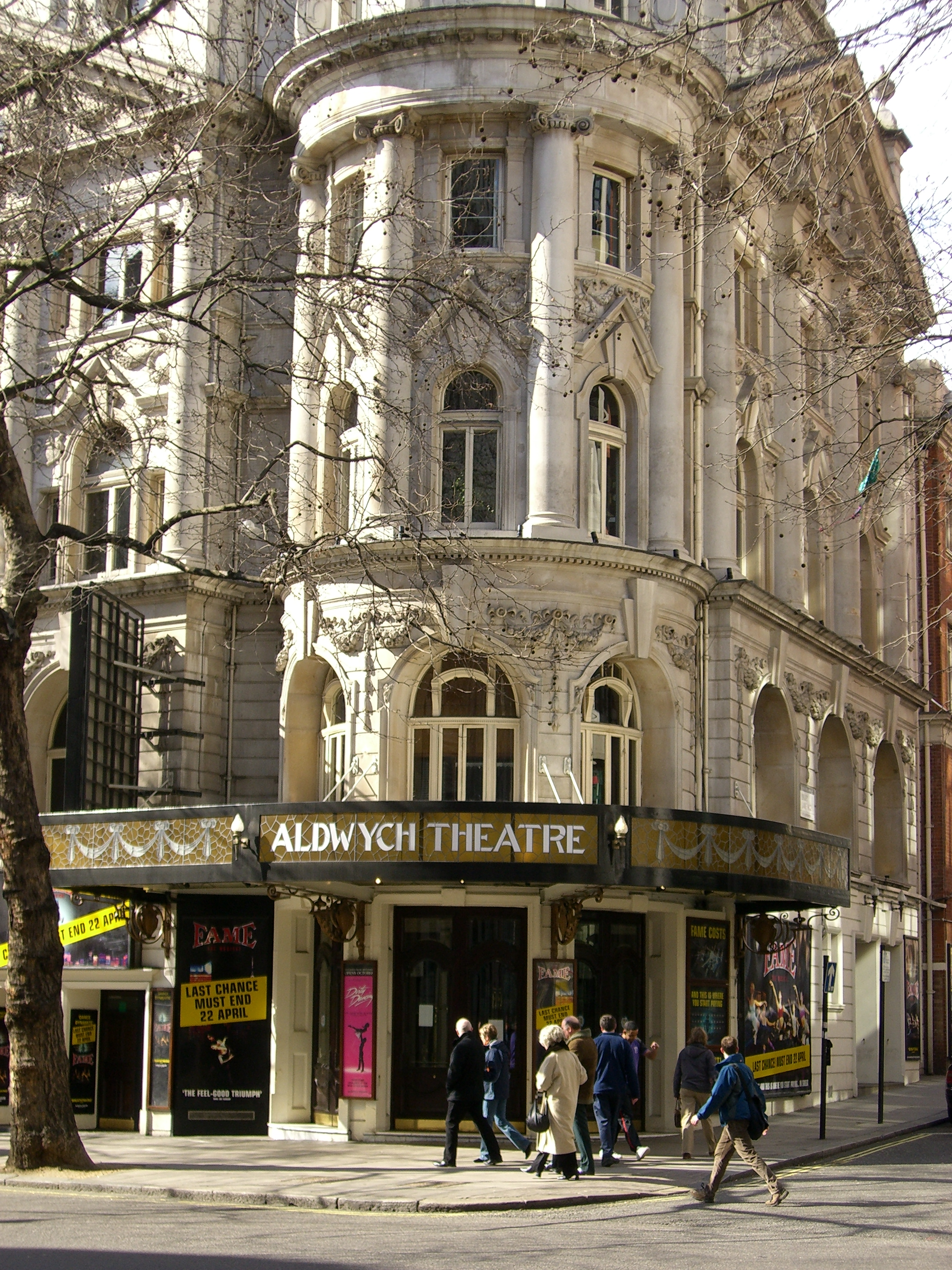
Aldwych Theatre in 2006

A Bit of a Test is a farce by Ben Travers. It was the last, and least successful, of the series of twelve Aldwych farces that ran in uninterrupted succession at the Aldwych Theatre in London from 1923 to 1933. The play depicts the efforts of the England cricket captain to keep his star batsman out of trouble during an Ashes series in Australia.

The piece opened on 30 January 1933 and ran until 3 June, a total of 142 performances.

== Background ==
The actor-manager Tom Walls had produced, directed and co-starred in nine Aldwych farces between 1923 and 1932. By the early 1930s his interest was moving from theatre to cinema, and though he produced the last three farces in the series he did not appear in them. Ben Travers, who had written all but three of the series, made no attempt to write Walls-type roles for another actor to play. Ralph Lynn, who had co-starred with Walls in the earlier farces, became the sole star for Dirty Work, Fifty-Fifty and A Bit of a Test. By 1933 some regular members of the Aldwych company had left, but there remained Lynn, in his customary "silly ass" roles, Robertson Hare, as a figure of put-upon respectability; Mary Brough as a good-hearted battle-axe; and the saturnine Gordon James.

Travers was a passionate devotee of cricket. In the wake of the controversial "Bodyline" series in Australia, he thought the general public would welcome a farce about the game. The British public was reasonably receptive, but the Australian public was not. Touring productions of the Aldwych farces had generally done well in Australia, but A Bit of a Test closed within four nights of opening in Melbourne. Travers commented that the Australians had a faulty sense of humour about themselves, particularly where cricket was concerned. "A sense of humor might have enabled the cricket controversy to have been avoided."

== Original cast ==
- Ben Craggs – Frederick Burtwell
- Gilbert Augustus Pogson – Robertson Hare
- "Dandy" Stratton – Ralph Lynn
- Colin Chilcote – Cameron Carr
- Sylvia Dale – Renée Gadd
- Mrs Rusby – Mary Brough
- Mrs Dunwiddy – Maidie Hope
- Rosemary Dunwiddy – Joan Brierley
- Schneider – E Louis Bradfield
- Old Dale – Gordon James
- Peters – William Collins
- Superintendent Barker – Charles Farrell
- PC Peck – Wilfred Hyde White

== Synopsis ==
Pogson, the captain of the English cricket team, is desperate to keep his star batsman, Stratton, in good form. At the close of the first day of the Brisbane test match, Stratton's score is 72 not out. His cricketing talent is offset, in Pogson's view, by his playboy habits. He has caused consternation by bringing a girlfriend, Sylvia Dale, into the dressing room, and Pogson is even more concerned when he learns that Stratton intends to drive out overnight to the Dale family's bungalow in the outback. Stratton, ever gallant, wishes to protect Sylvia's grandfather from a threatened attack by local bandits.

Pogson reluctantly sets off in pursuit, accompanied by the dauntless Mrs Rusby. At the bungalow, old Dale is held up by the bandits; Stratton and Sylvia engage them in combat, in which Pogson joins. While battle rages, Mrs Rusby leaps into the saddle and rides off to fetch the police. When they arrive, Stratton, who has laid out the bandits with a crowbar, sets about the police, not realising who they are.

The next morning, back in Brisbane, Stratton seems to be in such serious trouble with the police that there is little hope that Pogson can get him to the crease to resume his innings. The police, however, put cricket before minor infringements of law and order, and Stratton and Pogson get to the ground in time.

== Critical reception ==
The Times thought the running battle in the second act highly effective, but found that the resolution of the plot in the last act was too slow and not comic enough. Ivor Brown in The Observer also thought the second act the highlight: "essential, victorious Aldwych nonsense. O rare Ben Travers!" The Manchester Guardian commented, "The Aldwych Gentlemen v. Players can hold their own even on that tricky wicket the financial state of the London theatres in 1933."
