= Outrageous Fortune (play) =

Play by Ben Travers

- Written by: Ben Travers
- Original language: English
- Genre: Comedy
- Setting: Hertfordshire and London, present day

Premiere
- Date premiered: 1 September 1947
- Place premiered: Theatre Royal, Newcastle, Newcastle

Outrageous Fortune is a comedy play by the British writer Ben Travers. A farce, it premiered at the Theatre Royal, Newcastle before transferring to the Winter Garden Theatre in London's West End where it ran for 250 performances from 13 November 1947 to 19 June 1948. The West End cast included Robertson Hare, Ralph Lynn and Gordon James. A review in The Illustrated London News said it "has grandly reestablished the old "Aldwych" tradition."

== Bibliography ==
- Wearing, J. P. The London Stage 1940–1949: A Calendar of Productions, Performers, and Personnel. Rowman & Littlefield, 2014.
