= Ben Travers' Farces =

1970 British television series

- Genre: Comedy
- Written by: Ben Travers
- Directed by: Eric Fawcett
- Starring: Arthur Lowe; Richard Briers; Jenny McCracken
- Country of origin: United Kingdom
- Original language: English
- No. of series: 1
- No. of episodes: 7

Production
- Producer: Eric Fawcett
- Running time: 30 minutes
- Production company: British Broadcasting Corporation

Original release
- Network: BBC 1
- Release: 19 September – 31 October 1970

Ben Travers' Farces is a British comedy television series that originally aired on BBC 1. It ran for a single series of seven episodes between 19 September and 31 October 1970. Each was a stand-alone adaptation of a farce by Ben Travers. The first six episodes were adaptations of Aldwych Farces beginning with Rookery Nook while the seventh She Follows Me About was based on his wartime play of the same title.

== Main Cast ==
- Arthur Lowe (7 episodes)
- Richard Briers (6 episodes)
- Jenny McCracken (6 episodes)
- Megs Jenkins (3 episodes)
- Terence Alexander (3 episodes)
- Frank Thornton (3 episodes)
- Alec Ross (3 episodes)
- Tim Barrett (3 episodes)
- Irene Handl (2 episodes)
- Elizabeth Knight (2 episodes)
- Mollie Sugden (2 episodes)
- Geoffrey Palmer (2 episodes)
- Jessica Benton (2 episodes)
- Polly Adams (2 episodes)
- Althea Parker (2 episodes)
- Jonathan Cecil (2 episodes)
- Edward Dentith (2 episodes)

== Episodes ==
- Rookery Nook (19 September 1970)
- A Cuckoo in the Nest (26 September 1970)
- Turkey Time (3 October 1970)
- A Cup of Kindness (10 October 1970)
- Plunder (17 October 1970)
- Dirty Work (24 October 1970)
- She Follows Me About (31 October 1970)

== Bibliography ==
- Hogg, James. More Than Just A Good Life: The Authorised Biography of Richard Briers. Hachette UK, 2018.
