= Banana Ridge =

Banana Ridge may refer to:

- Banana Ridge (play), a 1938 play by Ben Travers
- Banana Ridge (film), a 1942 film based on the play
