= For Valour (1937 film) =

- Opening title
- Directed by: Tom Walls
- Screenplay by: Ben Travers
- Produced by: Max Schach
- Starring: Tom Walls; Ralph Lynn; Veronica Rose; Joan Marion
- Cinematography: Philip Tannura
- Edited by: E.B. Jarvis
- Music by: Van Phillips
- Production company: Capitol Film Corporation Ltd.
- Distributed by: General Film Distributors (UK)
- Release dates: 16 March 1937 (London, UK)
- Running time: 94 minutes
- Country: United Kingdom
- Language: English

For Valour is a 1937 British comedy film directed by Tom Walls and starring Walls, Ralph Lynn and Veronica Rose. It was made at Shepperton Studios, with sets designed by Oscar Werndorff. Unlike previous films starring Walls and Lynn, it was based on an original screenplay rather than one of the Aldwych Farces. Both Walls and Lynn played dual roles of two Boer War veterans and their son and grandson respectively. It was the last time the two actors, who had been one of the most popular film comedy teams of the decade, appeared together on screen.

== Synopsis ==
During the Boer War, Private Doubleday saves the life of Major Pyke. Pyke recommends that he be awarded a Victoria Cross but the Private is instead sent to prison when his past crimes are discovered. Pyke therefore decides to raise Doubleday's son as his own. Many years later the younger Doubleday has grown to be a master criminal who has never been caught by the police, but whose plans for a major job are ruined by the interference of his ex-convict father.

== Cast ==
- Tom Walls as Doubleday
- Ralph Lynn as Major Pyke
- Veronica Rose as Phyllis Chisholm
- Joan Marion as Clare Chester
- Hubert Harben as Mr. Gallop
- Henry B. Longhurst as Inspector Harding
- Gordon James as Fowle
- Reginald Tate as Chester
- Evan Thomas as Prison Governor
- Alan Napier as General
- Joyce Barbour as Barmaid
- Romilly Lunge as Stafford
- Basil Lynn as Solicitor
- Walter Lindsay as Butler
- D.J. Williams as Hiccuping Judge

== Critical reception ==
The Radio Times wrote, "this Ben Travers comedy keeps promising to burst into life, but is eventually snuffed out by the endless round of deceptions and misunderstandings that were the trademark of his celebrated Aldwych productions. Expert farceurs Tom Walls and Ralph Lynn are as happy as sandboys in their dual roles but, while Walls plays father and son with the customary glint in his eye, Lynn fails to bring the same vim to the part of a Boer War veteran as he does to his shady, silly-ass grandson"; whereas Sky Movies was more positive, writing, "Ben Travers contributes a clever screenplay with a sweetly-turned ending, and Walls (who also directed) and Lynn do first-class work"; and TV Guide called it "One of Walls and Lynn's better British comedies."

Writing for The Spectator in 1937, Graham Greene gave the film a good review, voicing his appreciation that the film brings viewers back to the elaborate and almost universal roguery in the tradition of The English Rogue and Moll Flanders. Greene praised the acting of both Walls and Lynn who play multiple characters throughout the film, and stated that his only complaint was that it was "a little marred by an inability to remain wholly flippant."

== Bibliography ==
- Low, Rachael. Filmmaking in 1930s Britain. George Allen & Unwin, 1985.
- Sutton, David R. A Chorus of Raspberries: British Film Comedy 1929-1939. University of Exeter Press, 2000.
- Wood, Linda. British Films, 1927-1939. British Film Institute, 1986.
