= The Dippers =

Play by Ben Travers

- Original language: English
- Written by: Ben Travers
- Genre: Comedy

Premiere
- Date: 10 April 1922
- Place: Royal Court Theatre, Liverpool

The Dippers is a comedy play by the British writer Ben Travers first performed in 1922 and based on his own 1920 novel of the same title. Featuring a musical score by Ivor Novello, it opened at the Royal Court Theatre in Liverpool before touring, and then transferring to the Criterion Theatre in London's West End where it ran for 174 performances between 22 August 1922 and 20 January 1923. The West End cast included Cyril Maude, George Bellamy, Ernest Trimingham, Jack Raine, Hermione Gingold, Christine Rayner and Binnie Hale. Travers subsequently went on to pen the series of Aldwych Farces.

== Synopsis ==
London lawyer Henry Talboyes is stranded at a small railway station. He accepts a lift to a nearby country house whose nouveau riche owner, Lord Mellingham, is hosting an elaborate party that evening. Talboyes is mistaken for one half of the professional dancing couple hired for the occasion, the eponymous Dippers, as the wife has turned up but the husband was delayed en route. The only person capable of untangling the mess is Talboyes's fiancee, the young widow Mrs Tavistock, who is providentially present at Mellingham Hall.

== Adaptation ==
In 1931 it was adapted by Travers himself into the British film The Chance of a Night Time directed by Herbert Wilcox and starring Ralph Lynn, Winifred Shotter and Kenneth Kove.
