= Wild Horses (play) =

1952 play

- Original language: English
- Written by: Ben Travers
- Genre: Comedy
- Setting: Knightsbridge, present day

Premiere
- Date: 18 August 1952
- Place: Opera House, Manchester

Wild Horses is a 1952 stage farce by the British writer Ben Travers. It was first performed at the Manchester Opera House in August 1952 before moving on to the Aldwych Theatre in the West End, lasting for 179 performances between November 1952 and April 1953. The plot revolves around the sale of a valuable painting. It starred Robertson Hare and Ralph Lynn who had previously appeared together in the Aldwych farces, written by Travers in the 1920s and 1930s. Other members of the cast included Robin Hunter, Cyril Smith, Colin Douglas, Frank Thornton, Joan Haythorne and Ruth Maitland.

== Bibliography ==
- Wearing, J.P. The London Stage 1950-1959: A Calendar of Productions, Performers, and Personnel. Rowman & Littlefield, 2014.
