= Robert Flemyng =

British actor (1912–1995)

Robert Flemyng OBE MC
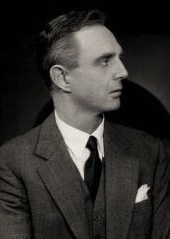
- Robert Flemyng in The Constant Wife (1953)
- Born: Benjamin Arthur Flemyng; 3 January 1912; Liverpool, Lancashire, England
- Died: 22 May 1995 (aged 83); London, England
- Education: Haileybury
- Occupation: Actor
- Years active: 1931–1995
- Spouse: Carmen Martha Sugars (m. 1939; died 1994)
- Children: 1 daughter

Benjamin Arthur Flemyng OBE MC (3 January 1912 – 22 May 1995), known professionally as Robert Flemyng, was a British actor. The son of a doctor, and originally intended for a medical career, Flemyng learned his stagecraft in provincial repertory theatre. In 1935 he appeared in a leading role in the West End, and the following year had his first major success, in Terence Rattigan's comedy French Without Tears. Between then and the Second World War he appeared in London and New York in a succession of comedies.

On the outbreak of war in 1939 Flemyng volunteered for the Royal Army Service Corps, and served with distinction, winning the Military Cross. After the war he continued to appear in light comedies, but also took on more serious roles in plays by T. S. Eliot, Graham Greene, John Whiting and others. He toured Australia, Britain, Canada, India, South Africa and the US in a wide range of parts, from comedy to classic drama.

Flemyng's broadcasting was principally in two television series in the 1960s, in the second of which, Compact, he appeared in more than 100 episodes. He also appeared in more than 30 films.

== Life and career ==
=== Early years ===
Flemyng was born in Liverpool, the son of George Gilbert Flemyng, a physician, and his second wife Rowena Eleanor, née Jacques. He was educated at Haileybury, and was then a medical student before abandoning medicine in favour of the theatre.

In June 1931, at the age of 19, Flemyng made his stage debut, playing Kenneth Raglan in Patrick Hamilton's thriller Rope at the County Theatre, Truro. He made his first appearance in London at the Westminster Theatre in October 1931, walking on in The Anatomist, and during 1932 he toured with Violet Vanbrugh's company, playing Cyril Greenwood in After All. In 1932 he joined the Liverpool Repertory Company at the Liverpool Playhouse. The company was directed by William Armstrong, who became known for training future stars including Robert Donat, Rex Harrison, Michael Redgrave and Diana Wynyard. Flemyng stayed at the Playhouse for three seasons, playing a wide range of roles. While there, he met his future wife, the actress Carmen Sugars.

Flemyng was still under contract to the Liverpool company when Raymond Massey and Gladys Cooper offered him a major West End role in the comedy Worse Things Happen at Sea. Armstrong, always willing to help his protégés, arranged for Flemyng's immediate release from the rest of his contract. The new play opened at the St James's Theatre; reviews for the piece were lukewarm but the cast, including Flemyng, were praised by the press. He played in four more light comedy roles between September 1935 and March 1936, before his first big success, of which the director Derek Granger wrote:

At the age of 24 he created the role of the dashing Kit Neilan in Terence Rattigan's French Without Tears, that shimmeringly light and beguiling comedy. It was a character to which he brought an immediate and distinctive charm in a play which was the perfect vehicle for bringing him to early prominence.

The play ran for 1,025 performances. Fleming played the role for 18 months, before handing over to Hubert Gregg for the rest of the run.

In April 1938 Flemyng appeared as the juvenile lead in a new Ben Travers farce, Banana Ridge. Later that year he made his North American debut, playing Tony Fox-Collier in the comedy Spring Meeting, which opened at His Majesty's Theatre, Montreal in November and at the Morosco Theatre, New York the following month, running there until March 1939. He remained on Broadway to play Makepiece Lovell in No Time for Comedy; his notices were good: the stars of the production were Laurence Olivier and Katherine Cornell but the reviewer in The Stage said that Flemyng "comes close to walking away with the show". In September 1939, on the outbreak of the Second World War, Flemying left the cast and returned to England to join the armed forces. He was an avid Everton FC supporter.

=== Second World War and post-war ===
Flemyng volunteered for the Royal Army Service Corps. He was commissioned and rose to become a full colonel at 33, one of the youngest in the British army. The Independent reports that "he served with great gallantry in Eritrea and Italy, in both of which campaigns he saw action". He was awarded the Military Cross (MC) in 1941, was mentioned in despatches, and was appointed OBE (military) in 1945.

At the end of the war Flemyng's first appearance was as Lord Harpenden in Rattigan's While the Sun Shines in an ENSA tour that finished at the Théâtre Marigny, Paris. In Britain he played a more serious role than usual in The Guinea Pig, a long-running play about a social experiment in which a working-class boy is sent to an exclusive private school. He reprised the role in a film version of the play, released in 1948. In 1947 he again played on Broadway, in a company led by John Gielgud; Flemyng played Algernon Moncrieff to Gielgud's John Worthing in The Importance of Being Earnest and Ben to his Valentine in Love for Love.

After returning to England, Flemyng appeared as Rowlie Bateson in Frank Vosper's People Like Us (July 1948), and Philotas in Rattigan's Adventure Story (June 1949). In a revival of French Without Tears he switched roles, playing the Hon Alan Howard, the part played by Rex Harrison in the first production. According to Granger, Flemyng "revealed a new, unsuspected, strength" when he appeared with Alec Guinness in T. S. Eliot's blank verse play The Cocktail Party at the Edinburgh Festival and then London and New York, in 1949–50. As Edward Chamberlayne, the distraught husband, Flemyng:

...seemed to have acquired a remarkable ability to convey the inner anguish of a troubled man of honour forced to face the consequences of his own emotional failings. His fine and sensitive playing of this part left an indelible impression that it could not have been better realised.

=== 1950s and 1960s ===
In the 1950s, Flemyng moved between light comedy – new and classic – and more serious roles. He toured southern Africa in Nancy Mitford's The Little Hut and Roger MacDougall's To Dorothy, A Son, and in London took over in the former from Robert Morley in the West End run. The piece ran for 1,261 performances; Flemyng was succeeded by Hugh Sinclair. In 1952–53 Flemyng toured the US, co-starring with Cornell, in Somerset Maugham's The Constant Wife. In 1954 he played a serious role, General Rupert Forster, a war criminal, in John Whiting's Marching Song.

Later in 1954 Flemyng appeared at the ANTA Playhouse, Broadway in a short-lived adaptation of Henry James's Portrait of a Lady. After a British tour in John Van Druten's comedy Bell, Book and Candle, Flemyng returned to Broadway in January 1957 to create the role of James Callifer in Graham Greene's The Potting Shed. In the same year he made his first Hollywood film, accepting Stanley Donen's invitation to appear in Funny Face.

In the 1960s Flemyng played a wide range of roles from old classics to heavyweight modern works and light comedy. He played Dr Sloper in The Heiress (1964), toured Australia as Anthony Wilcox in the boardroom melodrama Difference of Opinion (1965), returned to the US in The Cocktail Party, this time in the central role of Harcourt-Reilly (1965), and toured Britain as Garry Essendine in Present Laughter (1966).

Back in London, Flemyng played Richard Halton in On Approval (1966), Gregory Butler in Giles Cooper's Happy Family (1957), and Colonel Melkett in Black Comedy (1968). His final stage roles of the decade were in plays by Shakespeare and Shaw: Shylock in The Merchant of Venice at the Playhouse, Newcastle, in March 1969. Sir Colenso Ridgeon in The Doctor's Dilemma at the Shaw Festival, Niagara-on-the-Lake in June 1969, and Sir Broadfoot Basham in On the Rocks on a British tour later in the year.

=== Later years: 1970–1995 ===
At the beginning of the 1970s Flemyng again appeared in Shaw plays, as Mr Bompas in How He Lied to Her Husband and General Michelin in Press Cuttings (1970). Later in the year he played Maitland in The Chalk Garden, and returned to Shaw in 1971 as the Rev James Morrell in Candida. In 1973 he toured as Andrew Wyke in Sleuth, and the following year he toured South Africa as Sebastian Crutwell in Rattigan's In Praise of Love, subsequently repeating the part at the Theatre Royal, Windsor in 1975. Later in the year he toured in England and Canada as Philip in Alan Ayckbourn's Relatively Speaking.

In 1980 Flemyng played Sorin in The Seagull with Barbara Jefford as Arkadina, and the following year he co-starred in William Douglas-Home's The Kingfisher with Michael Denison and Dulcie Gray. He appeared for two years at the Savoy Theatre in Michael Frayn's Noises Off, taking over the role of Selsdon Mowbray from Michael Aldridge in early 1983 and handing it over to Hugh Paddick at the end of 1984. In 1988 he played Colonel Pickering in My Fair Lady to the Higgins of Denis Quilley and the Eliza of Liz Robertson. The following year he appeared with Michael Gambon and Jack Lemmon at the Haymarket in Veterans' Day in which they played veterans of, respectively, the First and Second World Wars and the Vietnam War.

In his late seventies Flemyng went on an arduous tour of India with John Dexter's Haymarket company, playing the title role in Julius Caesar, and Oedipus in Creon, Stephen Spender's version of Sophocles' Oedipus Rex. Among his last stage performances was a return to The Chalk Garden in 1992, this time playing the Judge, to the Mrs St Maugham of Constance Cummings and the Miss Marigold of Jean Marsh.

== Television ==
Flemyng's first television appearance was in 1949, playing Alan Howard in an adaptation of French Without Tears. In 1961 he co-starred with A. J. Brown in the ITV Granada series Family Solicitor. In 1962 and 1963 he played Edmund Bruce in more than 100 episodes of the BBC soap opera Compact. In 1964 he took the role of Julian in a TV version of A Day by the Sea, and the following year appeared as Michael in Graham Greene's The Living Room. In 1967 he appeared in The Avengers episode entitled "You Have Just Been Murdered" as Lord Maxted. In a dramatisation of Vanity Fair in 1970 he played Lord Steyne, and in 1979 he played Colonel Julyan in Daphne du Maurier's Rebecca. Between 1976 and 1982, he appeared in 24 episodes of Crown Court (TV series), playing Nigel Latimore QC and later Mr Justice Latimore. In 1982, in an eight-part adaptation of Howard Spring's Fame Is the Spur he played Lord Lostwithiel. In one-off television dramas he appeared in works by Agatha Christie (Spider's Web, 1985) and Muriel Spark (Memento Mori, 1992) and in 1995 he made his last television appearances, as John Godwin in a five-part adaptation of Joanna Trollope's The Choir.

== Radio ==
Flemyng was only an occasional broadcaster on radio. The BBC relayed excerpts from the stage productions of The Guinea Pig in 1946 and Adventure Story in 1949, and he appeared with Gielgud in scenes from The Importance of Being Earnest in 1947. He played Edward Voysey in a radio version of The Voysey Inheritance in 1951 and was in an adaptation of Happy Family broadcast by the West End cast in 1967.

== Cinema ==
In his 'Who's Who' entry, Flemyng mentioned four of his films: his first one, 'Head over Heels'; 'The Guinea Pig'; 'The Blue Lamp'; and 'The Man Who Never Was'.

== Filmography ==
- Head Over Heels (1937) as Pierre
- Bond Street (1948) as Frank Moody
- The Guinea Pig (1948) as Nigel Lorraine
- Conspirator (1949) as Captain Hugh Ladholme
- The Blue Lamp (1950) as Det. Sgt. Roberts
- Blackmailed (1951) as Dr. Giles Freeman
- The Magic Box (1951) as Doctor in Surgery
- The Holly and the Ivy (1952) as Major
- Cast a Dark Shadow (1955) as Philip Mortimer
- The Man Who Never Was (1956) as Lt. George Acres
- Funny Face (1957) as Paul Duval
- Let's Be Happy (1957) as Lord James MacNairn
- Windom's Way (1957) as Col. George Hasbrook
- Blind Date (1959) as Sir Brian Lewis
- A Touch of Larceny (1959) as Cmdr. John Larkin
- The Horrible Dr. Hichcock (1962) as Prof. Bernard Hichcock
- The King's Breakfast (1963) as Chamberlain (short)
- Mystery Submarine (1963) as Vice-Adm. Sir James Carver
- The Quiller Memorandum (1966) as Rushington
- The Spy with a Cold Nose (1966) as Chief MI5
- The Deadly Affair (1967) as Samuel Fennan
- The Blood Beast Terror (1968) as Dr. Carl Mallinger
- The Body Stealers (1969) as Wing Cmdr. Baldwin
- Oh! What a Lovely War (1969) as Major Mallory as Staff Officer in Gassed Trench
- Battle of Britain (1969) as Wing Cmdr. Willoughby
- The Firechasers (1971) as Carlton
- Young Winston (1972) as Dr. Buzzard
- The Darwin Adventure (1972) as Prof. Henslow
- Travels with My Aunt (1972) as Crowder
- Golden Rendezvous (1977) as Capt. Bullen
- The Four Feathers (1978) as Old Colonel
- The Medusa Touch (1978) as Judge McKinley
- The Thirty Nine Steps (1978) as Magistrate
- Lady Killers (1980) as Cecil Havers
- Paris by Night (1988) as Jack Sidmouth
- Kafka (1991) as The Keeper of the Files
- Shadowlands (1993) as Claude Bird

== Personal life ==
Flemyng married Carmen Martha Sugars in November 1939; by this time, she had switched from acting into theatrical décor, joining the design team Motley. The couple had one daughter and they remained married until Carmen’s death in 1994. In 2003, years after Flemyng’s death, one writer claimed that he was homosexual. Flemyng suffered a stroke in April 1995, and died on 22 May, aged 83. In its obituary, The Stage called him "one of this country's most distinguished and respected performers, the last of the great matinee idols".

== References and sources ==
=== Sources ===
- Gaye, Freda, ed. (1967). Who's Who in the Theatre (fourteenth ed.). London: Sir Isaac Pitman and Sons. OCLC 5997224.
- Herbert, Ian, ed. (1972). Who's Who in the Theatre (fifteenth ed.). London: Sir Isaac Pitman and Sons. ISBN 978-0-273-31528-5.
- Read, Piers Paul (2003). Alec Guinness: The Authorised Biography. New York: Simon & Schuster. ISBN 978-0-7432-4498-5.
- Wearing, J. P. (2014). The London Stage 1950–1959: A Calendar of Productions, Performers, and Personnel. Lanham: Rowman & Littlefield. ISBN 978-1-322-15916-4.
