= Just My Luck (1933 film) =

1933 film

- Directed by: Jack Raymond
- Screenplay by: Ben Travers
- Based on: Fifty-Fifty by H.F. Maltby
- Produced by: Herbert Wilcox
- Starring: Ralph Lynn; Winifred Shotter; Robertson Hare; Davy Burnaby
- Edited by: Alfred Roome
- Music by: Lew Stone
- Distributed by: Woolf & Freedman Film Service
- Release date: 1933
- Running time: 77 minutes
- Country: United Kingdom
- Language: English

Just My Luck is a 1933 British comedy film directed by Jack Raymond and starring Ralph Lynn, Winifred Shotter, Davy Burnaby and Robertson Hare. The screenplay was written by Ben Travers based on a 1932 Aldwych farce by H.F. Maltby, Fifty-Fifty, adapted from the French play Azaïs by Louis Verneuil and Georges Berr.

== Plot summary ==
A shy teacher takes over the running of a hotel.

== Cast ==
- Ralph Lynn as David Blake
- Winifred Shotter as Peggy Croft
- Davy Burnaby as Sir Charles Croft
- Robertson Hare as Trigg
- Vera Pearce as Lady Croft
- Frederick Burtwell as Stromboli
- Phyllis Clare as Babs

== Critical reception ==
In 1933, the Melbourne Argus wrote, "one has become accustomed to seeing Ralph Lvnn as Ralph Lynn in every part which he plays. His appearances in the opening sequences of Just My Luck (at the Majestic) as a music teacher who expects everyone to kick him down the back stairs raises hopes that at last one is to see him subordinate himself to a character. The hopes are refreshing but fragile, like a glass of iced lager in the tropics - not that it matters much. Ralph Lynn as Ralph Lynn is as diverting a spectacle as the British screen can offer. The attitude to life of Mr. Blake, the music master, Is expounded in a single phrase. "I wonder why that didn't hit me," he ponders when a loose slate slides from a rooftop and shatters at his feet. Poor Mr. Blake has had 35 years of bad luck...Mr. Lynn contrives to leaven his foolery with touches of genuine pathos, but when his luck changes to prove the comforting theory that a man has as much good as bad fortune in his life, he fairly romps in his Rookery Nook style, through broader and yet broader farce. It is all very good fun, though. Mr. Lynn is supported by an able cast, which includes Winifred Shotter and Robertson Hare."
