= Gordon James (actor) =

English actor (1878–1949)

Gordon James

Gordon James (22 July 1878 – 3 February 1949) was an English actor who became known as the "heavy" in the Aldwych farces, between 1923 and 1933. He also appeared in some twenty films between 1929 and 1942.

James was born on 22 July 1878 in Manchester as Sydney Lynn, he was the brother of Ralph Lynn, who co-starred in the Aldwych farces with Tom Walls. James appeared alongside his brother in all twelve of the farces. They were two of only three performers to appear in every one of the Aldwych series; the other was Robertson Hare. James's roles were: George McChesney in It Pays to Advertise (1923, under his real name); Noony in A Cuckoo in the Nest (1925); Admiral Juddy in Rookery Nook; Death in Thark (1927); Simon Veal in Plunder (1928); Nicholas Ramsbotham in A Cup of Kindness (1929); Knee in A Night Like This (1930); Luke Meate in Turkey Time (1931); Toom in Dirty Work (1932); Francis in Fifty-Fifty (1932); and Old Dale in A Bit of a Test (1933). He appeared in the wartime farce She Follows Me About by Ben Travers, author of the Aldwych Farces.

He made his first screen appearance in the 1929 film Atlantic, followed by film versions of the Aldwych farces in the early 1930s (often alongside his brother Ralph), and a variety of other films until 1942.

James died in London on 3 February 1949.

== Filmography ==
- Atlantic (1929)
- Tons of Money (1930)
- Plunder (1931)
- Thark (1932)
- Summer Lightning (1933)
- A Cuckoo in the Nest (1933)
- Dirty Work (1934)
- A Cup of Kindness (1934)
- Foreign Affaires (1935)
- Fighting Stock (1935)
- Stormy Weather (1935)
- Pot Luck (1936)
- Pagliacci (1936)
- Love in Exile (1936)
- For Valour (1937)
- A Spot of Bother (1938)
- Second Best Bed (1938)
- Saloon Bar (1940)
- Now You're Talking
- The Young Mr. Pitt (1942)
