= Banana Ridge (play) =

Play written by Ben Travers

Banana Ridge is a farce by Ben Travers. It opened at the Strand Theatre on 27 April 1938 and ran for 291 performances.

The play revolves round the question of the paternity of a young man, and the worry of each of the two principal characters that he may be the young man's father.

== Background ==
In the 1920s and 30s Travers had written nine farces which, with three by other authors, were known collectively as the Aldwych farces. The series had run in uninterrupted succession at the Aldwych Theatre between 1923 and 1933 After this Travers attempted a serious play on a religious theme, but it was not a success. He did better with his next play, O Mistress Mine (1936), a romantic Ruritanian comedy. Banana Ridge was his return to the genre for which he was celebrated. It starred Robertson Hare, one of the best-loved members of the regular Aldwych team, and Alfred Drayton, an experienced and popular comic actor. Travers, who did not usually act, played the role of Wun, a servant. He had spent some years in Malaya as a young man, and wrote, and sometimes improvised, colloquial Malay lines for himself.

== Original cast ==
- Eleanor Pound – Kathleen O'Regan
- Mason – Basil Lynn
- Susan Long – Olga Lindo
- Digby Pound – Alfred Drayton
- Willoughby Pink – Robertson Hare
- Jones – Robert Flemyng
- Cora Pound – Carla Lehmann
- Basil Bingley – Frank Royde
- Jean Pink – Constance Lorne
- Wun – Ben Travers
- Staples – Atholl Fleming
- Sir Ramsey Tripp – William Senior

== Revivals and adaptations ==
The play was revived in 1976, opening at the Savoy Theatre on 19 July, and running until 13 August 1977. It starred Robert Morley as Digby Pound and George Cole as Willoughby Pink. Cole was succeeded in January 1977 by Julian Orchard.

A film adaptation of the play was made in 1942, under the same title. Hare and Drayton repeated their stage roles. It was directed by Walter C. Mycroft, who co-wrote the screenplay with Travers and Lesley Storm.
