= The Party Spirit =

1954 play

- Original language: English
- Written by: Peter Jones; John Jowett
- Genre: Comedy

Premiere
- Date: 1 February 1954
- Place: Grand Theatre, Blackpool

The Party Spirit is a 1954 British comedy play by Peter Jones and John Jowett.

It premiered at the Grand Theatre, Blackpool before transferring to the Piccadilly Theatre in London's West End where it ran for 131 performances from 23 September 1954 and 15 January 1955. Starring Robertson Hare and Ralph Lynn, the cast also included Roger Maxwell, Frank Thornton and Vera Pearce.

== Bibliography ==
- Wearing, J.P. The London Stage 1950-1959: A Calendar of Productions, Performers, and Personnel. Rowman & Littlefield, 2014.
