= Turkey Time (1933 film) =

1933 film directed by Tom Walls

- Directed by: Tom Walls
- Written by: Ben Travers (play)
- Produced by: Michael Balcon
- Starring: Tom Walls; Ralph Lynn; Robertson Hare; Dorothy Hyson
- Cinematography: Charles Van Enger
- Edited by: Helen Lewis
- Music by: Jack Beaver
- Production company: Gaumont British
- Distributed by: Gaumont British Distributors
- Release date: December 1933
- Running time: 72 minutes
- Country: United Kingdom
- Language: English

Turkey Time is a 1933 British comedy film directed by Tom Walls and starring Walls, Ralph Lynn, Robertson Hare and Dorothy Hyson. The screenplay concerns a group of guests come to stay with the Stoatt family in the seaside town of Eden Bay for Christmas. They soon become involved with an impoverished concert performer whose innocent presence in the house leads to a series of misunderstandings. It was adapted from the 1931 play Turkey Time by Ben Travers, one of the Aldwych Farces.

== Production ==
The film was part of a successful series of screen adaptations of the Aldwych Farces throughout the 1930s that had begun with Rookery Nook in 1930. It was made by British Gaumont, the second film the actors had made with that studio after switching from Herbert Wilcox's British & Dominions Film Corporation. The screenplay was written by Ben Travers, adapted from his own play. The German Alfred Junge worked as art director.

== Cast ==
- Tom Walls as Max Wheeler
- Ralph Lynn as David Winterton
- Dorothy Hyson as Rose Adair
- Robertson Hare as Edwin Stoatt
- Mary Brough as Mrs. Gather
- Norma Varden as Ernestine Stoatt
- Veronica Rose as Louise Stoatt
- D. A. Clarke-Smith as Westbourne
- Marjorie Corbett as Florence, the maid
- Daphne Scorer as Jane
- Gwen Clifford as Cook
- O. B. Clarence as Shopowner
