= Thark (film) =

1932 film

- Directed by: Tom Walls
- Written by: Ben Travers
- Produced by: Herbert Wilcox
- Starring: Tom Walls; Ralph Lynn; Robertson Hare
- Cinematography: Freddie Young
- Edited by: Alfred Roome
- Music by: Lew Stone
- Production company: British and Dominions
- Distributed by: Woolf and Freedman
- Release date: 27 July 1932
- Running time: 79 minutes
- Country: United Kingdom
- Language: English

Thark is a 1932 British film farce, directed by Tom Walls, with a script by Ben Travers. In addition to Walls, the film stars Ralph Lynn and Robertson Hare. The film is a screen adaptation of the original 1927 Aldwych farce play Thark. It was made at British and Dominion's Elstree Studios.

== Premise ==
Mrs. Todd is aggrieved at finding that the country house she has bought is evidently haunted. Sir Hector Benbow and his nephew, on behalf of the previous owner, set out to demonstrate that there is no ghost.

== Cast ==
- Hook – Robertson Hare*
- Warner – Marjorie Corbett
- Cherry Buck – Joan Brierley
- Lionel Todd – Claude Hulbert
- Mrs. Todd – Mary Brough*
- Sir Hector Benbow – Tom Walls*
- Ronald Gamble – Ralph Lynn*
- Lady Benbow – Beryl de Querton
- Kitty Stratton – Evelyn Bostock
- Death – Gordon James*
- Whittle – Hastings Lynn*

Cast members marked * were the creators of the roles in the original stage production; the Todds were surnamed "Frush" in the stage play.

== Reception ==
The film was popular at the box office.
