= Up to the Neck =

1933 film

- Feature on the fim in Picture Show (20 January 1934)
- Directed by: Jack Raymond
- Written by: Ben Travers
- Produced by: Herbert Wilcox
- Starring: Ralph Lynn; Winifred Shotter; Francis Lister
- Cinematography: Cyril Bristow
- Music by: Lew Stone
- Production company: British and Dominions
- Distributed by: United Artists
- Release date: August 1933
- Running time: 73 minutes
- Country: United Kingdom
- Language: English

Up to the Neck is a 1933 British comedy film directed by Jack Raymond and starring Ralph Lynn, Winifred Shotter and Francis Lister. It was written by Ben Travers and was made at British and Dominion's Elstree Studios.

== Plot ==
Shy bank clerk Norman B. Good comes into a big inheritance and uses it to realise his ambition to be a theatre impresario. Falling for chorus girl April Dawne, he invests most of his money in an expensive show designed to make her a star. When the production is a disaster, Norman takes to the stage in a desperate bid to improve the play by playing the lead. His monocle and toothy grin win him raves as a comic genius (despite the fact that he was playing the role straight), and the show becomes a hit as a comedy.

== Cast ==
- Ralph Lynn as Norman B. Good
- Winifred Shotter as April Dawne
- Francis Lister as Eric Warwick
- Reginald Purdell as Jimmy Catlin
- Mary Brough as landlady
- Marjorie Hume as Vera Dane
- Grizelda Harvey as Miss Fish

== Reception ==
Kine Weekly wrote: "A clean, refreshing farcical comedy, a typical Ben Travers effort, which relies with success upon familiar situations, and the experienced and resourceful fooling of Ralph Lynn for its exceedingly popular humour. The tempo is not fast, but it is adequate, and the good opening and capital ending more than compensate for the rather leisurely intermediate stages. A strong team pull their weight in support, and the technical qualities are first rate. Good comedy bet for all classes, one with a star that matters."

The Daily Film Renter wrote: "Farce comedy, with Ralph Lynn as stage aspirant who inherits fortune and becomes theatrical backer. Main comicalities spring from star's amusing attempts to pass academy acting exam, coy courtship of comely chorine and eventual triumph as comedy genius in serious role. Winifred Shotter lends charming feminine support."
