= She Follows Me About =

Play by Ben Travers

- Written by: Ben Travers
- Original language: English
- Genre: Comedy
- Setting: England, present day

Premiere
- Date premiered: 14 June 1943
- Place premiered: Theatre Royal, Birmingham

She Follows Me About is a comedy play by the British writer Ben Travers. A farce, it premiered at the Theatre Royal, Birmingham before transferring to the Garrick Theatre in London's West End where it ran for 196 performances between 15 October 1943 and 18 March 1944. The West End cast included Robertson Hare, Basil Radford, Joyce Heron, Percy Parsons, Gordon James, Aubrey Mallalieu, Pauline Tennant and Catherine Lacey. The plot revolved around a Vicar who unwittingly discovers that his camera has photographs of two nude WAAFS on it, taken as part of a mischievous dare.

In 1970 it was adapted by the BBC for an episode of Ben Travers' Farces featuring Arthur Lowe. It was the only one of seven episodes not be based on one of the playwright's pre-war Aldwych Farces.

== Bibliography ==
- De Jongh, Nicholas. Politics, Prudery & Perversions: The Censoring of the English Stage, 1901-1968. Methuen, 2000.
- Wearing, J. P. The London Stage 1940–1949: A Calendar of Productions, Performers, and Personnel. Rowman & Littlefield, 2014.
