= Dirty Work (1934 film) =

1934 British film by Tom Walls

- Directed by: Tom Walls
- Written by: Ben Travers
- Starring: Ralph Lynn; Gordon Harker; Robertson Hare
- Cinematography: Philip Tannura
- Edited by: Alfred Roome
- Music by: Louis Levy; Jack Beaver
- Production company: Gaumont British Picture Corporation
- Distributed by: Gaumont British Distributors
- Release date: 6 December 1934
- Running time: 70 minutes
- Country: United Kingdom
- Language: English

Dirty Work is a 1934 British comedy crime film directed by Tom Walls and starring Ralph Lynn, Gordon Harker, Robertson Hare and Basil Sydney. It was based on Dirty Work, one of the Aldwych Farces, by Ben Travers, which had some of the same cast members. The film was made at the Lime Grove Studios with sets designed by the art director Alfred Junge.

== Plot ==
A private detective is hired to protect expensive jewelry.

== Cast ==
- Ralph Lynn as Jimmy Milligan
- Gordon Harker as Nettle
- Robertson Hare as Clement Peck
- Lilian Bond as Evie Wynne
- Basil Sydney as Hugh Stafford
- Margaretta Scott as Leonora Stafford
- Cecil Parker as Gordon Bray
- Gordon James as Toome
- Peter Gawthorne as Inspector Barlow
- Norma Varden as Tiara customer
- Percy Walsh as Customer with umbrella

== Bibliography ==
- Low, Rachael. Filmmaking in 1930s Britain. George Allen & Unwin, 1985.
- Wood, Linda. British Films, 1927-1939. British Film Institute, 1986.
