= The Chance of a Night Time =

1931 British film by Herbert Wilcox

- Directed by: Herbert Wilcox; Ralph Lynn
- Written by: W. P. Lipscomb
- Based on: The Dippers by Ben Travers
- Produced by: Herbert Wilcox
- Starring: Ralph Lynn; Winifred Shotter; Kenneth Kove
- Cinematography: Freddie Young
- Edited by: Maclean Rogers
- Music by: Lew Stone
- Production company: Herbert Wilcox Productions
- Distributed by: British & Dominions Film Corporation
- Release date: 15 May 1931
- Running time: 70 minutes
- Country: United Kingdom
- Language: English

The Chance of a Night Time is a 1931 British comedy film directed by Herbert Wilcox and starring Ralph Lynn, Winifred Shotter and Kenneth Kove. The screenplay was written by Ben Travers based on his play The Dippers, and the cast included cast members from Travers's Aldwych Farces. It was shot at Elstree Studios outside London with sets designed by the art director Lawrence P. Williams.

== Plot ==
Bashful lawyer Henry cannot attend his fiancée's birthday party because of a business engagement. However, farcical circumstances find him mistaken for the dance partner of a professional lady hired to entertain a country house party at which his fiancée is a guest.

== Cast ==
- Ralph Lynn as Henry
- Winifred Shotter as Pauline Gay
- Kenneth Kove as Swithin
- Sunday Wilshin as Stella
- Robert English as General Rackham
- Dino Galvani as Boris Bolero
- Norma Varden as Mrs. Rashley-Butcher
- Al Bowlly as Vocalist

== Critical reception ==
The New York Times wrote, "Its chief distinction is really the characterization offered by Mr. Ralph Lynn in the role of a diffident lawyer...Miss Winifred Shotter, who is a favorite member of the "Aldwych school," is effective as Pauline, the danseuse, as she plays up well to Mr. Lynn, who, with an experience gained in Hollywood, has won what some judges hold to be the foremost place among English screen comedians. Here and there comparisons with the much more elaborate settings which Hollywood would have devised for a picture of this kind are unavoidable, but on the whole the genuine atmosphere and environment of an English country house has been retained; and there is compensation in verisimilitude for what the eye loses in the way of spectacle...Though there is no gainsaying the fact that this picture is full of robustious humor, is pat in dialogue and quick in action for an English offering, there are still times when the onlooker is inclined to suggest "getting on with it"; while more recently, Allmovie wrote, " It's Ralph Lynn's show all the way, and he makes the most of every comic opportunity. It would be nice to say that the film's production values were on the same level as the star's performance -- nice, and untrue."
