= Dirty Work (play) =

Play written by Ben Travers

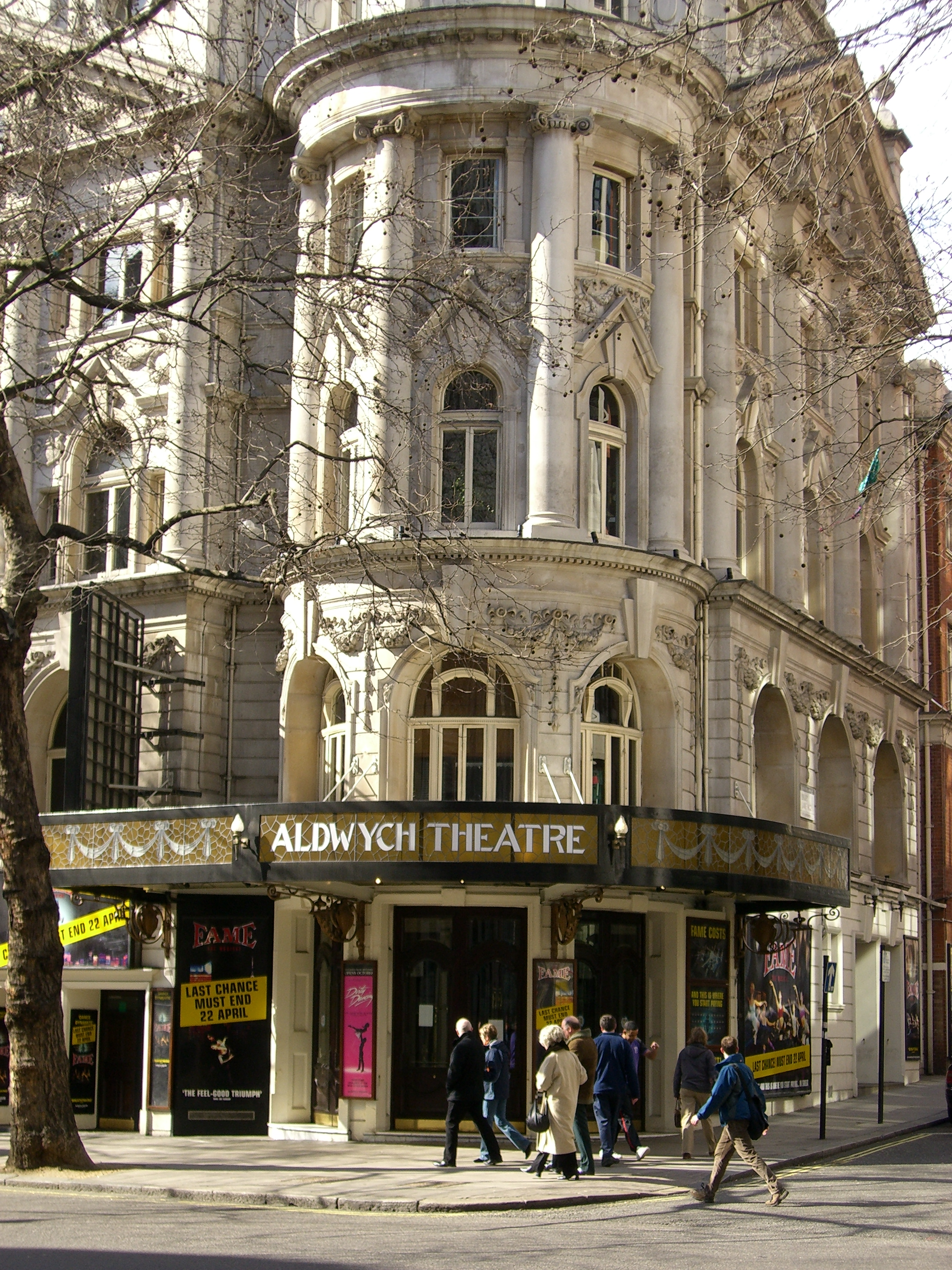
Aldwych Theatre in 2006

Dirty Work is a farce by Ben Travers. It was one of the series of twelve Aldwych farces that ran in uninterrupted succession at the Aldwych Theatre in London from 1923 to 1933. The play depicts the maladroit but ultimately successful efforts of a shop-walker to outwit a gang of jewel thieves.

The piece opened on 7 March 1932 and ran for 193 performances until 26 August. A film adaptation of the play was made in 1934.

== Background ==
The actor-manager Tom Walls had produced, directed and co-starred in nine farces at the Aldwych since 1923. By the early 1930s his interest was moving from theatre to cinema, and though he produced the new work he did not appear in it. Ben Travers, who had written all but two of the previous farces, made no attempt to write a Walls-type role for another actor to play. Ralph Lynn, who had co-starred with Walls in the previous farces, became the sole star. Many members of the familiar company remained: Lynn, in his customary "silly ass" role, Robertson Hare, as a figure of put-upon respectability; Mary Brough as a good-hearted battle-axe; Ethel Coleridge as the voice of middle-class primness; and the saturnine Gordon James. Walls was missed by the critics and the public; the play was the first of the series to run for fewer than 250 performances.

== Original cast ==
- Gordon Bray – Archibald Batty
- Detective-Sergeant Barlow – Phil Carlton
- Connie Pepper – Marjorie Corbett
- Maisie Till – Joan Brierley
- Mrs Bugle – Mary Brough
- Wrench – Louis Bradfield
- James Milligan – Ralph Lynn
- Toome – Gordon James
- Hugh Stafford – Henry Hewitt
- Leonora Stafford – Margaretta Scott
- Evie Wynne – Constance Carpenter
- Mona Flower – Ethel Coleridge
- Clement Peck – Robertson Hare
- Mr Jolly – George Barrett

== Synopsis ==
James Milligan, a senior employee in a Bond Street jewellers, comes under suspicion when an item goes missing. The house detective is an accomplice of a gang of jewel thieves, and plants a stolen jewel on Milligan. A junior employee, Evie Wynne, who admires Milligan, knows him to be innocent. With the aid of the formidable housekeeper, Mrs Bugle, the grim night-watchman, Toome, and the solemn head assistant, Clement Peck, they stage a fake burglary of the shop, adopting disguises. Peck's disguise requires him to shave off his cherished moustache, to his indignation. By dropping a discreet word to a suave customer who is correctly suspected of being part of the gang, the conspirators lure the real thieves into intruding into the premises during the supposed burglary. The thieves are rounded up, and Evie and Milligan pair off.

== Critical reception ==
The Daily Mirror commented, "There have been Aldwych farces with a better plot and more cumulative farcical interest, but in this one Ben Travers, the perennial author, shows that he still has the ability to get a laugh in almost every line." The Times found "the smooth impulse of Mr Tom Walls is sadly lacking", but considered the play "in general, and with intervals, a pleasant absurdity". The Manchester Guardian thought the play not quite on a par with earlier Aldwych farces, specifically Rookery Nook or Thark, but granted it "a worthy place in the sequence". The paper praised Travers for lifting English farce "well out of the rut of French night clubs and hotel corridors". The Observer thought the play "a quieter instalment of the Aldwych serial than usual [but] nevertheless one of the best. It has more purposeful restraint than some, and lays its preposterous mines more cunningly in the fairway."

== Adaptations ==
The play was made into a film in 1934, under the same title. Tom Walls directed; Lynn, Hare, James and Margaretta Scott reprised their stage roles. The role of Mrs Bugle was written out; Mary Brough had been taken fatally ill at Easter 1934.
