= Summer Lightning (film) =

1933 film

- Ralph Lynn and Winifred Shotter in the film
- Directed by: Maclean Rogers
- Written by: Miles Malleson
- Based on: novel Summer Lightning by P.G. Wodehouse
- Produced by: Herbert Wilcox
- Starring: Ralph Lynn; Winifred Shotter; Chili Bouchier
- Cinematography: Freddie Young
- Production companies: Herbert Wilcox Productions (for); British & Dominions Film Corporation
- Distributed by: United Artists Corporation (UK)
- Release dates: 10 July 1933 (London, UK)
- Running time: 78 minutes
- Country: United Kingdom
- Language: English

Summer Lightning is a 1933 British comedy film directed by Maclean Rogers and starring Ralph Lynn, Winifred Shotter, Chili Bouchier and Horace Hodges. It was written by Miles Malleson based on the 1929 novel Summer Lightning by P.G. Wodehouse.

== Preservation status ==
The British Film Institute National Archive holds a collection of ephemera and stills but no film or video materials.

== Premise ==
Hugo Carmody, the impoverished secretary to Lord Emsworth, falls for Millicent the boss's niece, and steals his Lordship's prize pig in a scheme to raise funds to marry her.

== Cast ==
- Ralph Lynn as Hugo Carmody
- Winifred Shotter as Millicent Keeble
- Chili Bouchier as Sue Brown
- Horace Hodges as Lord Emsworth
- Helen Ferrers as Lady Emsworth
- Esmé Percy as Baxter
- Miles Malleson as Beach
- Gordon James as Pillbeam
- Joe Monkhouse as Pigman

== Reception ==
Kine Weekly wrote: "Bright, infectious, farcical comedy, typically English in humour and romantic sentiment, provides a sprightly vehicle for the irresistible asinine comicalities of Ralph Lynn, whose tireless efforts enable the changes to be effectively rung on evergreen situations. All that can be demanded of a popular light booking, from star values to clean, wholesome fun, is here, and the result is a British picture which should meet with more than favourable results at the box-office."

The Daily Film Renter wrote: "Star's characteristic absurdities keep inconsequential plot going at fair pace. Occasionally witty dialogue, hint of romance, and laughable situations, combine in making film interesting."
