= A Cup of Kindness (film) =

1934 British film by Tom Walls

- Directed by: Tom Walls
- Written by: Ben Travers
- Based on: A Cup of Kindness, original stage version
- Produced by: Michael Balcon
- Starring: Tom Walls; Ralph Lynn; Robertson Hare; Dorothy Hyson
- Cinematography: Philip Tannura
- Edited by: Alfred Roome
- Music by: Bretton Byrd
- Release date: May 1934
- Running time: 81 minutes
- Country: United Kingdom
- Language: English

A Cup of Kindness is a 1934 British comedy film directed by and starring Tom Walls. It also featured Ralph Lynn, Robertson Hare, Dorothy Hyson and Claude Hulbert. It was based on a 1929 play by Ben Travers of the same name, one of the Aldwych farces, and had four of the same cast members. Graham Moffatt, later of Will Hay fame, made his debut appearance as a choir boy in this film.

== Plot ==
The son and daughter of two feuding families announce their upcoming marriage, to widespread uproar.

== Cast ==
- Tom Walls as Fred Tutt
- Ralph Lynn as Charlie Tutt
- Robertson Hare as Ernest Ramsbottom
- Dorothy Hyson as Betty Ramsbottom
- Claude Hulbert as Stanley Tutt
- Marie Wright as Mrs Ramsbottom
- Eva Moore as Mrs Tutt
- Veronica Rose as Tilly Wynn
- Gordon James as Nicholas Ramsbottom
