= Fighting Stock =

- Opening title card
- Directed by: Tom Walls
- Screenplay by: Ben Travers
- Starring: Tom Walls; Ralph Lynn; Robertson Hare
- Cinematography: Philip Tannura
- Edited by: Charles Frend
- Music by: Louis Levy
- Production company: Gaumont British Picture Corporation
- Distributed by: Gaumont British Distributors
- Release dates: 10 April 1935 (London, UK)
- Running time: 69 minutes
- Country: United Kingdom
- Language: English

Fighting Stock is a 1935 British comedy film directed by and starring Tom Walls. It also features Robertson Hare, Lesley Wareing and Herbert Lomas. its plot involves a Brigadier who retires to a country cottage for some quiet fishing, but it soon overtaken by madcap events. The screenplay is by Ben Travers based on his earlier stage play of the same name, and the cast included cast members from Travers's Aldwych Farces.

It was filmed at Islington Studios with sets by Oscar Friedrich Werndorff.

== Cast ==
- Tom Walls as Brig. Gen. Sir Donald Rowley
- Ralph Lynn as Sydney Rowley
- Robertson Hare as Duck
- Marie Lohr as Mrs. Barbara Rivers
- Herbert Lomas as Murlow
- Lesley Wareing as Eileen Rivers
- Veronica Rose as Diana Rivers
- Hubert Harben as Mr. Rivers
- Margaret Davidge as Mrs. Fenton
- Peggy Simpson as Maid
- Mary Jerrold as Emmie
- Sybil Grove as Mrs. Peacock
- Norah Howard as Ada

== Critical reception ==
Sky Movies gave the film three out of five stars, and wrote, "The `Aldwych' comedy trio of Tom Walls, Ralph Lynn and J Robertson Hare in another of their great laughter hits from the Thirties, this one taking the mickey out of the huntin', shootin' and fishin' brigade. Tom Walls also directs, and keeps the fun fast and frantic. Amusing Tom and Jerry-style stuff from some highly polished farceurs."

== Bibliography ==
- Low, Rachael. Filmmaking in 1930s Britain. George Allen & Unwin, 1985.
- Wood, Linda. British Films, 1927-1939. British Film Institute, 1986.
