= Norma Varden =

English-American actress (1898–1989)

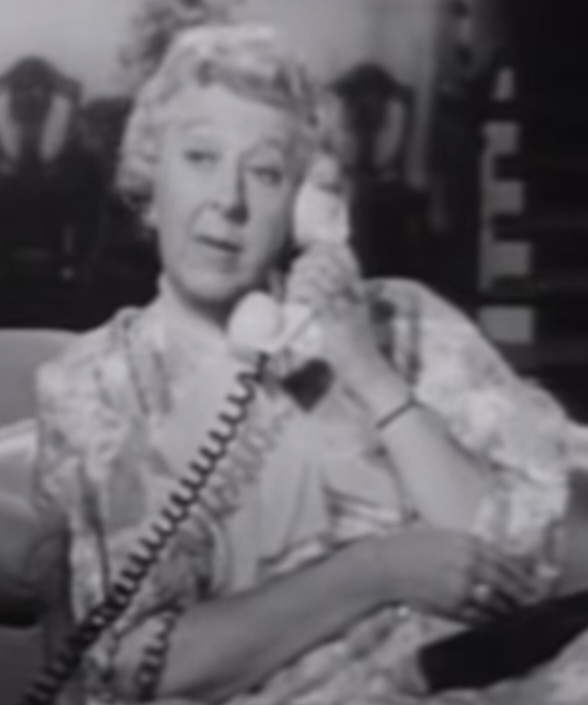
- Varden in Five Minutes to Live (1961)
- Born: Norma Varden Shackleton; 20 January 1898; London, England
- Died: 19 January 1989 (aged 90); Santa Barbara, California, U.S.
- Resting place: Santa Barbara Cemetery
- Education: Guildhall School of Music and Drama
- Occupation: Actress
- Years active: 1920–1969
- Known for: The Sound of Music; Casablanca; Gentlemen Prefer Blondes

Norma Varden Shackleton (20 January 1898 – 19 January 1989), known professionally as Norma Varden, was an English-American actress with a long film career.

== Life and career ==
=== Early life ===
Born in London, the daughter of a retired sea captain, Varden was a child prodigy. She trained as a concert pianist in Paris and performed in England before deciding to take up acting. She studied at the Guildhall School of Music and Drama and made her first appearance as Mrs Darling in Peter Pan.

=== Theatre career ===
In England, Varden was a protege of actress Kate Rorke. She acted in repertory theatre and made her West End debut in The Wandering Jew in 1920. From Shakespeare to farce, she established herself as a regular member of the Aldwych Theatre company where she appeared in plays from 1929 to 1933. She began to appear in British films, usually in haughty upper-class roles.

=== Move to America and film career ===
Varden's English film roles led to offers from Hollywood, and she moved there at the start of World War II, beginning a long career of playing character and supporting roles. Notable films Varden appeared in include Casablanca (1942), The Major and the Minor (1942), The White Cliffs of Dover (1944), National Velvet (1944), The Green Years (1946), Forever Amber (1947), Strangers on a Train (1951), Gentlemen Prefer Blondes (1953), Jupiter's Darling (1955), and Witness for the Prosecution (1957). She played the housekeeper Frau Schmidt in The Sound of Music (1965). Two years later, she had a minor part as Lady Petherington in Doctor Dolittle (1967).

=== Television career ===
She had a recurring role in the 1960s NBC sitcom Hazel as Harriet Johnson. She appeared on CBS's I Love Lucy as Mrs. Benson, the neighbour with whom the Ricardos switch apartments after the birth of Little Ricky in 1953. In 1957, she guest-starred as Mrs. Weddington-Brown in Mr. Adams and Eve episode "The Social Crowd." She was cast as Mrs. Murdock in the 1961 episode "The Swedish Girl" on ABC's The Real McCoys. She appeared on CBS's Perry Mason as Winifred Wileen in the 1964 episode, "The Case of the Illicit Illusion". That same year, Varden, along with veteran character actress and comedienne Kathleen Freeman were featured in a third-season episode of The Lucy Show entitled "Lucy Gets Her Maid". In that installment, Varden played yet another snooty socialite named Mrs. Van Vlack who hires Lucy Carmichael (Lucille Ball) as a maid. She also appeared on the seventh-season episode of The Beverly Hillbillies "Problem Bear" as the snobby socialite, Mrs. Vanransenhoff, who went home with Granny to get gossip on Mrs. Drysdale. Varden played Mrs. Dumont in a 1966 (Season 3, Ep.11) episode of Bewitched entitled "Oedipus Hex", sitting on a "Ways & Means" charity committee with Samantha Stephens to raise funds for a children's playground. Varden played Mrs. Hermione Monteagle in episode 13 of the Batman series of the 1960s.

== Personal life and death ==
She became a naturalised United States citizen on 28 January 1949.

Varden died of heart failure in Santa Barbara, California the day before her 91st birthday. She is interred in Santa Barbara Cemetery.

== Complete filmography ==
- The Glorious Adventure (1922) as Court Lady (uncredited)
- The Chance of a Night Time (1931) as Mrs. Rashley-Butcher (uncredited)
- A Night Like This (1932) as Mrs. Tuckett (uncredited)
- Crime on the Hill (1933) as Editor's Secretary (uncredited)
- Happy (1933) as Miss Stone, Secretary with Glasses (uncredited)
- Turkey Time (1933) as Ernestine Stoatt
- Evergreen (1934) as Barmaid (uncredited)
- The Iron Duke (1934) as Duchess of Richmond
- Dirty Work (1934) as Tiara Customer (uncredited)
- The Student's Romance (1935) as Dora Streudelmeier, Karl's Aunt
- Boys Will Be Boys (1935) as Lady Dorking
- Stormy Weather (1935) as Mrs. Dulcie Bullock
- Foreign Affaires (1935) as Mrs. Hardy Hornett
- Get Off My Foot (1935) as Mrs. Rawlingcourt
- Music Hath Charms (1935) as Bit (uncredited)
- The Amazing Quest of Ernest Bliss (1936) (uncredited)
- Where There's a Will (1936) as Lady Margaret Wimpleton
- East Meets West (1936) as Lady Mallory
- Windbag the Sailor (1936) as Olivia Potter-Porter
- Fire Over England (1937) as Elena's Governess (uncredited)
- Wanted! (1937) as Mrs. Smithers
- The Lilac Domino (1937) (uncredited)
- Strange Adventures of Mr. Smith (1937) as Mrs. Broadbent
- Make-Up (1937) as Hostess
- Rhythm Racketeer (1937) as Della Nash
- Fools for Scandal (1938) as Cicely Trevel (uncredited)
- You're the Doctor (1938) as Lady Beatrice
- Everything Happens to Me (1938) as Mrs. Prodder
- Little Ladyship (1939, TV Movie) as Mrs. Cynthia Bigley
- Home from Home (1939) as Mrs. Fairweather
- Shipyard Sally (1939) as Lady Patricia Randall
- The Earl of Chicago (1940) as Maureen Kilmount
- Waterloo Bridge (1940) as Hostess at Restaurant (uncredited)
- Hit Parade of 1941 (1940) (uncredited)
- The Mad Doctor (1940) as Woman at Charity Bazaar (uncredited)
- Scotland Yard (1941) as Lady Heathcote
- Road to Zanzibar (1941) as Clara Kimble (uncredited)
- Glamour Boy (1941) as Mrs. Lee
- We Were Dancing (1942) as Mrs. Bryce-Carew
- Flying with Music (1942) as Miss Mullens
- The Glass Key (1942) as Henrys' Dinner Guest (uncredited)
- The Major and the Minor (1942) as Mrs. Osborne
- Casablanca (1942) as Wife of Pickpocketed Englishman (uncredited)
- Random Harvest (1942) as Julia
- Johnny Doughboy (1942) as Miss Penticott (uncredited)
- Slightly Dangerous (1943) as Opera Singer (uncredited)
- Dixie (1943) as Mrs. LaPlant (uncredited)
- The Good Fellows (1943) as Mrs. Drayton
- Sherlock Holmes Faces Death (1943) as Gracie, Barmaid (uncredited)
- My Kingdom for a Cook (1943) as Margaret, Morley's Cook (uncredited)
- What a Woman! (1943) as Miss Timmons
- The White Cliffs of Dover (1944) as Mrs. Bland
- Mademoiselle Fifi (1944) as The Wholesaler's Wife
- Double Indemnity (1944) as Secretary (uncredited)
- National Velvet (1944) as Miss Sims
- Bring on the Girls (1945) as Aunt Martha
- Those Endearing Young Charms (1945) as Mrs. Woods, Hall's Floor Lady
- The Cheaters (1945) as Mattie (uncredited)
- Girls of the Big House (1945) as Mrs. Thelma Holt
- Hold That Blonde! (1945) as Flora Carteret
- The Green Years (1946) as Mrs. Bosomley
- The Searching Wind (1946) as Mrs. Hayworth
- Millie's Daughter (1947) as Mrs. Sarah Harris
- The Trouble with Women (1947) as Mrs. Wilmer Dawson
- Ivy (1947) as Joan Rodney (uncredited)
- Thunder in the Valley (1947) as Lady Eleanor (uncredited)
- Forever Amber (1947) as Mrs. Abbott (uncredited)
- Where There's Life (1947) as Mabel Jones
- Mr. Ashton Was Indiscreet (1947) as Woman at Banquet (uncredited)
- My Own True Love (1948) as Red Cross Nurse (uncredited)
- The Amazing Mr. X (1948) as Wealthy-Looking Woman (uncredited)
- The Scar (1948) as Mrs. Gerry (uncredited)
- Let's Live a Little (1948) as Nurse Brady
- Adventure in Baltimore (1949) as H. H. Hamilton
- The Secret Garden (1949) as Nurse
- Fancy Pants (1950) as Lady Maude
- Strangers on a Train (1951) as Mrs. Cunningham
- Thunder on the Hill (1951) as Pierce
- The Highwayman (1951) as Dowager at Ball (uncredited)
- Washington Story (1952) (uncredited)
- Les Miserables (1952) as Madame Courbet (uncredited)
- Something for the Birds (1952) as Congresswoman Bates (uncredited)
- Young Bess (1953) as Lady Tyrwhitt
- Loose in London (1953) as Aunt Agatha
- Gentlemen Prefer Blondes (1953) as Lady Beekman
- Elephant Walk (1954) as Shop Customer (uncredited)
- Three Coins in the Fountain (1954) as Woman at Cocktail Party (uncredited)
- Dynamite, the Story of Alfred Nobel (1954, TV Movie)
- The Silver Chalice (1954) as Roman Matron (uncredited)
- Jupiter's Darling (1955) as Fabia
- The Birds and the Bees (1956) as Passenger (uncredited)
- Sneak Preview (1956) (Season 1 Episode 1: "Just Plain Folks")
- Witness for the Prosecution (1957) as Mrs. Emily Jane French
- In the Money (1958) as Mrs. Smythe-Chumley (uncredited)
- The Buccaneer (1958) as Madame Hilaire
- The Miracle (1959) as Mrs. MacGregor (uncredited)
- Alfred Hitchcock Presents (1960) (Season 5 Episode 35: "The Schartz-Metterklume Method") as Jenny (uncredited)
- Five Minutes to Live (1961) as Priscilla Auerbach
- Rome Adventure (1962) as Dean of Briarcroft College for Women (uncredited)
- 13 Frightened Girls (1963) as Miss Pittford
- Island of Love (1963) as Wife in Nightclub (uncredited)
- Kisses for My President (1964) as Miss Dinsendorff (uncredited)
- The Sound of Music (1965) as Frau Schmidt, housekeeper
- A Very Special Favor (1965) as Mother Plum
- Two's Company (1965, TV Movie) as Lady Ordering Drink at Party (uncredited)
- Doctor Dolittle (1967) as Lady Petherington
- The Impossible Years (1968) as Dr. Jenkins (uncredited)
- Istanbul Express (1968, TV Movie) as Englishwoman
- Doc (1969, TV Movie) as Mrs. Dobson (final film role)
