= Thark (play) =

Play written by Ben Travers

Aldwych company in Thark (1927). From left: Mary Brough, Ralph Lynn, Winifred Shotter, Robertson Hare, Tom Walls, Ethel Coleridge and Gordon James

Thark is a farce by the English playwright Ben Travers. It was first given at the Aldwych Theatre, London, the fourth in the series of twelve Aldwych farces presented at the theatre by the actor-manager Tom Walls between 1923 and 1933. It starred the same cast members as many of the other Aldwych farces. The story concerns a reputedly haunted English country house. Investigators and frightened occupants of the house spend a tense night searching for the ghost.

The piece opened on 4 July 1927 and ran for nearly a year. Travers made a film adaptation, which Walls directed in 1932, with most of the leading members of the stage cast reprising their roles.

== Background ==
The actor-manager Tom Walls produced the series of Aldwych farces, nearly all written by Ben Travers, and starring himself and Ralph Lynn, who specialised in playing "silly ass" characters. Walls assembled a regular company of actors to fill the supporting roles, including Robertson Hare, who played a figure of put-upon respectability; Mary Brough in eccentric old lady roles; Ethel Coleridge as the severe voice of authority; Winifred Shotter as the sprightly young female lead; and the saturnine Gordon James.

Walls and his team had already enjoyed three substantial hits at the Aldwych, with It Pays to Advertise (1923), which had run for 598 performances; A Cuckoo in the Nest (1925, 376 performances); and Rookery Nook (1926, 409 performances).

Thark was Travers's third playscript for the company, and his first original plot, following two earlier adaptations from his novels. The play opened on 4 July 1927 and ran for 401 performances until 16 June 1928.

== Original cast ==
- Hook – Robertson Hare
- Warner – Ann Furrell
- Cherry Buck – Ena Mason
- Lionel Frush – Kenneth Kove
- Mrs Frush – Mary Brough
- Sir Hector Benbow – Tom Walls
- Ronald Gamble – Ralph Lynn
- Lady Benbow – Ethel Coleridge
- Kitty Stratton – Winifred Shotter
- Jones – Gordon James
- Whittle – Hastings Lynn

== Synopsis ==
=== Act I ===
Sir Hector Benbow's library in his flat in Mayfair. An autumn evening.

Benbow is the legal guardian of Kitty Stratton. On her behalf he has negotiated the sale of her large country house, Thark, to the nouveau riche Mrs Frush. Owing to a misunderstanding with his butler, Hook, and maid, Warner, Benbow has two conflicting dinner dates. One is with Mrs Frush, who is now unhappy about buying the house; the other is with Cherry Buck, a young woman on whom Benbow's roving eye has lighted. Both engagements are at risk because Lady Benbow, who is away, has unexpectedly declared her intention of returning home forthwith. Benbow asks his nephew Ronny to look after Cherry; Ronny agrees to do so, though worried that his fiancée, Kitty, will be unreasonably jealous if she finds out that he has been taking other young women to dinner à deux. Kitty arrives. Ronny resourcefully makes out that he is taking Mrs Frush to dinner on behalf of Sir Hector. He is alone in the room when Cherry is announced. In panic he introduces her to Lady Benbow and Kitty as Mrs Frush, whom neither has met. Cherry plays along with him, out of mischief, as does Sir Hector, out of necessity. Ronny is leaving with the supposed Mrs Frush when the real one is shown in. Lady Benbow and Kitty jump to more-or-less correct conclusions.

=== Act II ===
The same. Next morning

Ronny sends Hook to bring Cherry back to the flat to explain to Kitty that Ronny is innocent. Mrs Frush's son Lionel falls for Kitty, exchanges barbed banter with Ronny, and rushes off to buy flowers for Kitty. Cherry returns, but in exonerating Ronny she necessarily incriminates Sir Hector. A precarious domestic harmony is restored. Lionel returns and is much taken with Cherry, whom he invites to lunch. Mrs Frush arrives and complains to Benbow that she has bought the house without being warned that it is haunted. Kitty, conscience-stricken, offers to go to Thark to investigate the supposed ghost. Ronny insists on accompanying her. Lady Benbow does likewise, and reluctantly Benbow agrees to join them. He recruits a highly nervous Hook to complete the party.

=== Act III ===
Scene 1 – The dining room at Thark. A week later, after dinner

Benbow and Ronny are drinking port after a good dinner. They are both taken aback by Mrs Frush's butler, whom she calls "Jones", but whose real name is Death; his looks and manner are sinister in the extreme. Both Benbow and Ronny are compromised in the eyes of their partners by a letter from Cherry telling Benbow that thanks to him she has someone special in her life: she means Lionel, but does not name him. Lady Benbow assumes she is talking about Sir Hector; and Kitty thinks she is referring to Ronny. Lionel has announced to his mother his intention of returning to Thark that evening. Uncle and nephew are interrupted by the entrance of Whittle, an investigative journalist eager to pursue the story of the haunted house. Ronny, who has been allotted the supposedly haunted bedroom, happily agrees that Whittle can stay there overnight, but Benbow is hostile to anything likely to perpetuate the idea of a resident ghost, and he throws Whittle out. A minute or so later Hook rushes downstairs in a great fright. He was making up the bed in Benbow's room when the door opened and shut mysteriously and he thought he saw a flitting figure. The company's collective jitters are made worse when Death appears, at his most doom-laden (see image, above). Benbow declares the opening door to have been nothing but the wind and imagination; Mrs Frush claims that it proves her case. To show she is wrong Benbow and Ronnie – the former with a false air of bravado, and the latter frankly terrified – agree to sleep in the haunted room. Death asks them, "What time would you like your call?"

Scene 2 – Ronny's room at Thark. 3 o'clock the following morning

Ronny and his uncle are sleeping uncomfortably in a small double bed. Lionel and Cherry creep in. They have arrived by car, and do not know which bedrooms have been allotted to them. They withdraw, closing the door with a click that wakes Ronny from an uneasy sleep. Benbow pooh-poohs his terror, but both are unnerved when the door again opens slowly. It is Lionel again; they send him away. They are wakened once more by rapping at the window. This time it is Cherry, who has escaped along the balcony from the adjoining bedroom, where she was disturbed by a mysterious figure. Benbow, armed, goes to investigate. Ronny is so distraught that he accidentally knocks over a gong, rousing the whole household. Kitty is not pleased to find Cherry alone with Ronny, and neither is Lionel, but they accept Ronny's explanation. Uncle and nephew are left alone once more, but are disturbed yet again, this time by noises from beneath the bed. It is Whittle, who has sneaked back in and concealed himself. He stealthily moves to the window. As he opens the curtains there is an enormous clap of thunder, pictures are blown off the walls, and a huge branch of a tree falls through the window-panes. Once again the entire household rushes through the bedroom door. They all stand aghast.

== Reception ==
The Times praised the performances but thought the play too unsubstantial to be wholly satisfactory, although it found it "full of entertaining fragments". Ivor Brown of The Manchester Guardian also praised the actors, and judged that "Thark provides them with good enough territory for their latest skirmish." The Daily Express said that the scene in the haunted bedroom had "mirth-provoking qualities [that] can rarely been equalled in the West End" and "made even a sophisticated audience laugh until it cried."

== Revivals and adaptations ==
In 1932, Walls directed a film adaptation of the play, under the same title. Travers wrote the screenplay, and Walls, Lynn, Hare, and Brough reprised their old stage roles. The Evening Telegraph called it "poor cinema, but excellent entertainment".

The first London revival of the stage play was in 1965, with Peter Cushing and Alec McCowen as Benbow and Gamble. A 1989 production at the Lyric, Hammersmith featured Dinsdale Landen and Griff Rhys Jones. In August 2013, Snapdragon Productions presented a revival at The Park Theatre in a new adaptation, by the actor and writer Clive Francis, who starred in the Tom Walls role alongside James Dutton as Ronny Gamble.

The BBC has televised three productions of the play. The first was in 1948; the second, in 1957, was played by Brian Rix's Whitehall company. A third television version of the play was filmed by the BBC in 1968, directed by Donald McWhinnie, with Ronald Hines and Jimmy Thompson in the Walls and Lynn roles.
