= Aldwych farce =

Series of twelve stage farces presented at the Aldwych Theatre, London

Aldwych company in Thark (1927). From left: Mary Brough, Ralph Lynn, Winifred Shotter, Robertson Hare, Tom Walls, Ethel Coleridge and Gordon James

The Aldwych farces were a series of twelve stage farces presented at the Aldwych Theatre, London, nearly continuously from 1923 to 1933. All but three of them were written by Ben Travers. They incorporate and develop British low comedy styles, combined with clever word-play. The plays were presented by the actor-manager Tom Walls and starred Walls and Ralph Lynn, supported by a regular company that included Robertson Hare, Mary Brough, Winifred Shotter, Ethel Coleridge, and Gordon James.

The farces were so popular that touring companies were sent to present them in the British provinces. Most of the Aldwych farces were adapted for film in the 1930s, starring the original stage casts as far as possible. The plays were later seen in television versions and some enjoyed revivals.

== History ==
Leslie Henson and Tom Walls co-produced the farce Tons of Money in 1922 at the Shaftesbury Theatre. This was a great popular success, running for nearly two years, and they collaborated again, moving to the Aldwych Theatre. Walls secured a cheap, long-term lease on the theatre, which had fallen so far out of fashion with playgoers that it had been used as a YMCA hostel during the First World War.

Rookery Nook, Aldwych Theatre, 1926: from left Tom Walls, Ralph Lynn, Stella Bonheur and Ena Mason

The first in the Aldwych farce series was It Pays to Advertise, which ran for nearly 600 performances. Meanwhile, Ben Travers's first play, The Dippers, based on his 1920 novel of the same name, was produced and directed by Sir Charles Hawtrey. It became a success on tour from 1921 and in another London theatre in 1922. Lawrence Grossmith had acquired the rights to Travers' farce A Cuckoo in the Nest and sold them to Walls.

It took Travers some time to establish a satisfactory working relationship with Walls, whom he found difficult as an actor-manager, and also distressingly unprepared as an actor. In the early days, he also had reservations about the other star of the company, Ralph Lynn, who initially ad-libbed too much for the author's taste. Travers built on each play, and the characterisations in the earlier plays, in writing the next farce for the company; and even Walls's calls to the stage manager for lines became a popular part of opening nights at the Aldwych.

The Aldwych farces also featured a regular team of supporting actors: Robertson Hare as a figure of put-upon respectability; Mary Brough in eccentric old lady roles; Ethel Coleridge as the severe voice of authority; the saturnine Gordon James as the "heavy"; and first Yvonne Arnaud, then Winifred Shotter, as the sprightly young female lead. The plays generally revolved around a series of preposterous incidents involving a misunderstanding, borrowed clothes and lost trousers, involving the worldly Walls character, the innocent yet cheeky Lynn, the hapless Hare, the beefy, domineering Brough, the lean, domineering Coleridge, and the pretty and slightly spicy Shotter, all played with earnest seriousness. The scripts incorporated and developed British low comedy styles, particularly "silly-asses, henpecked husbands, battleaxe mothers-in-law and lots of innocent misunderstandings."

The farces proved popular and touring casts were regularly sent to the provinces. Some touring players, such as William Daunt (1893–1938) who played the Ralph Lynn roles, made considerable personal successes in the 1920s playing Aldwych farces in the provinces. Lynn's younger brother Hastings Lynn, played his brother's roles in successful productions in Australia and New Zealand. Among the up-and-coming performers who appeared in Aldwych farces before becoming famous were Roger Livesey, Margot Grahame, and Norma Varden.

After five years of extraordinary success, Walls's business partnership with Henson ended in September 1927 during the run of Thark, and from October, the Aldwych farces were presented by the firm of Tom Walls and Reginald Highley Ltd. By 1930, Walls was losing interest in the theatre, turning his attention to the cinema. He did not appear in the last three of the twelve Aldwych farces, which had disappointing runs. The last of them, A Bit of a Test in 1933, ran for 142 performances, compared with runs of more than 400 performances for some of the earlier productions.

In 1952, three years after Walls's death, Lynn and Hare starred at the Aldwych in a new Travers farce, Wild Horses. It ran from 6 November 1952 to 11 April 1953. In the 1950s and early 1960s, a similar hit series of farces began at the Whitehall Theatre and came to be known as Whitehall farces.

== On stage ==
The following table shows the opening and closing dates and the number of performances given in the original productions of the Aldwych farces. All were written by Ben Travers, except where otherwise shown:

Title	Opening	Closing	Perfs.	Plot and notes
It Pays to Advertise	2 February 1923	10 July 1925	598	The playboy son of a rich manufacturer sets up a spurious rival to his father's company. To his father's astonishment the venture is successful. (By Roi Cooper Megrue and Walter Hackett.)
A Cuckoo in the Nest	22 July 1925	26 June 1926	376	A young man is forced by circumstances to share a room overnight with a married woman friend. Their spouses take some convincing that there has been no impropriety.
Rookery Nook	30 June 1926	25 June 1927	409	A newlywed man gives shelter to a damsel in distress in his wife's absence, and has to head off scandal stirred up by his interfering sister-in-law.
Thark	4 July 1927	16 June 1928	401	The new owner of a country house insists that it is haunted. The old owner's family set out to prove that it is not.
Plunder	26 June 1928	27 April 1929	344	Two friends rob a rapacious woman of her jewels. An accidental death in the course of the crime complicates matters.
A Cup of Kindness	24 May 1929	1 February 1930	291	The son and daughter of feuding suburban families marry. The families attempt, with sporadic success, to sink their differences.
A Night Like This	18 February 1930	15 November 1930	267	A policeman and a flâneur join forces to outwit a criminal gang and restore a stolen necklace to its owner.
Marry the Girl	24 November 1930	16 May 1931	195	The defendant in a breach of promise case returns happily to the arms of the plaintiff; his more recent love pairs off with the plaintiff's lawyer. (By George Arthurs and Arthur Miller)
Turkey Time	26 May 1931	16 January 1932	263	A member of a seaside concert party is stranded when the promoter of her show absconds. Two chivalrous men, impeded at every turn by rampaging landladies demanding money, rescue her.
Dirty Work	7 March 1932	27 August 1932	195	The manager of a jewellery shop stages a mock robbery to trap a gang of thieves.
Fifty-Fifty	5 September 1932	21 January 1933	161	A shy music teacher finds himself running a casino. (Adapted by H. F. Maltby from a French original by Louis Verneuil and Georges Berr)
A Bit of a Test	30 January 1933	3 June 1933	142	England's cricket captain strives to keep his star batsman out of trouble during an Ashes series in Australia.

== In film ==
Winifred Shotter, leading lady in eight of the original farces and five of the filmed versions

Most of the farces, as well as some other works by Travers, were filmed during the 1930s. The films featured many of the actors who had starred in the plays; Walls directed all the films except for Just My Luck and Marry the Girl. The films introduced the farces to cinema audiences and were produced by a number of film distributors including the British and Dominions Film Corporation, Gaumont-British Picture Corporation, and Gainsborough Pictures.

Films of the original Aldwych farces are:

- Rookery Nook (1930; released in the US as One Embarrassing Night)
- Plunder (1931)
- A Night Like This (1932, with W. P. Lipscomb)
- Thark (1932)
- A Cuckoo in the Nest (1933, with A. R. Rawlinson)
- Turkey Time (1933)
- Just My Luck (1933; filmed version of Fifty-Fifty)
- A Cup of Kindness (1934)
- Dirty Work (1934)
- Marry the Girl (1935)

The two Aldwych farces not filmed by members of the company were It Pays to Advertise and A Bit of a Test. The first of these plays was an updated and Anglicised adaptation of an American play of 1914; a version of the original play was filmed in the US in 1931, starring Norman Foster, Carole Lombard, and Richard "Skeets" Gallagher.

Other filmed farces by Travers, with one or more of the Aldwych stars, are:

- The Chance of a Night Time (1931; based on the Travers play The Dippers)
- Fighting Stock (1935; based on the Travers play of the same name)
- Foreign Affaires (1935; an original screenplay by Travers)
- Pot Luck (1936; loosely based on the Travers play, A Night Like This)
- Second Best Bed (1938; based on a Travers story)
- Banana Ridge (1941, with Walter C. Mycroft and Lesley Storm, from the Travers play of the same name)

Other film comedies of the period directed by Walls, with many of the Aldwych stars, are:

- On Approval (1930; based on the play On Approval by Frederick Lonsdale)
- Tons of Money (1930 remake)

== Revivals and broadcasts ==
Of the twelve Aldwych farces, Rookery Nook has been regularly revived. It is a staple of repertory companies from Dundee to Wolverhampton, Colchester and Oxford, and has been revived in four productions in the West End. Plunder has had several revivals: at the Bristol Old Vic in 1973, at the National Theatre in 1976, and at the Savoy Theatre in 1994. A Cuckoo in the Nest was revived by the English Stage Company at the Royal Court in 1964. As at 2013, the only other of the twelve to have been revived in the West End is Thark, in 1965 and 1989.

The BBC has televised productions of several of the farces. In the 1950s, Brian Rix's Whitehall company broadcast a series of performances. In 1970, BBC presented adaptations of six of the Aldwych series (and another Travers farce, She Follows Me About) with Arthur Lowe and Richard Briers in the Walls and Lynn roles.

== Architectural style ==
In 1939 the artist and author Osbert Lancaster published Homes Sweet Homes, which consisted of drawings and descriptions of the interiors of buildings over the centuries. He coined terms for several styles, including "Aldwych Farcical", and showed in his illustration an example of a typical interior of the period, reminiscent of the stage sets for several of the Aldwych farces:

Here the lounge-hall reaches the ultimate peak of its development. From an impressive landing, always referred to as the gallery, a flight of polished oak stairs lead down to a gleaming parquet sea on which float a variety of rich Turkey rugs. Light and air, the former in small quantities, the latter in unlimited supplies, are admitted through a bewildering selection of doors and French windows which one constantly expects (such is the theatrical complexity of their arrangement) to fly open and reveal the pyjama-clad forms of Mr Robertson Hare or Mr Ralph Lynn. On the walls, or rather such part of them as is not covered by a wealth of old oak panelling, hang long lines of sporting prints, punctuated here and there by a barometer or a warming-pan, testifying to the strong sporting instincts of the squirearchy of Metroland.

The Oxford English Dictionary defines the term as "Of or relating to an Aldwych farce ... designating a type of architecture or interior design resembling the upper-middle-class domestic setting of this genre".
