= Pot Luck (1936 film) =

- Original Trade Advertisement
- Directed by: Tom Walls
- Written by: Ben Travers
- Produced by: Michael Balcon
- Starring: Tom Walls; Ralph Lynn; Robertson Hare; Diana Churchill
- Cinematography: Arthur Crabtree; Roy Kellino
- Edited by: Alfred Roome
- Music by: Louis Levy; Jack Beaver
- Distributed by: Gainsborough Pictures
- Release date: April 1936
- Running time: 71 minutes
- Country: United Kingdom
- Language: English

Pot Luck is a 1936 British comedy film directed by and starring Tom Walls. The screenplay is by Ben Travers based loosely on his 1930 stage play A Night Like This. It also featured Ralph Lynn, Robertson Hare, Diana Churchill and Martita Hunt. The cast included members of the regular Aldwych Farce company.

== Plot ==
A retired Scotland Yard detective, Patrick Fitzpatrick (Tom Walls) comes back to take one final case, tracking down a missing vase which has been stolen by a gang of thieves specialising in taking art treasures. His investigation takes him to the home of the innocent Mr Pye (Robertson Hare), whose house has been used by the crooks to hide their proceeds.

== Cast ==
- Tom Walls as Inspector Patrick Fitzpatrick
- Ralph Lynn as Reggie Bathbrick
- Diana Churchill as Jane Bathbrick
- Robertson Hare as Mr Pye
- Peter Gawthorne as Chief Constable
- Gordon James as Cream (the butler)
- Martita Hunt as Mrs Cream (the cook)
- J.A. O'Rourke as Kelly
- Cyril Smith as Miller

== Critical reception ==
Writing for The Spectator in 1936, Graham Greene gave the film a neutral review, praising the direction and the acting of Tom Walls and of Robertson Hare, but deigning to praise Ralph Lynn for his performance explaining that he had a peculiar antipathy toward his acting.
