= Banana Ridge (film) =

1942 British film by Walter C. Mycroft

- Directed by: Walter C. Mycroft
- Written by: Ben Travers (play); Lesley Storm; Walter C. Mycroft
- Produced by: Walter C. Mycroft
- Starring: Robertson Hare; Alfred Drayton; Isabel Jeans; Nova Pilbeam
- Cinematography: Claude Friese-Greene
- Edited by: Flora Newton
- Music by: Harry Acres; Marr Mackie
- Production company: Associated British Picture Corporation
- Distributed by: Associated British Picture Corporation
- Release date: 20 April 1942
- Running time: 88 minutes
- Country: United Kingdom
- Language: English

Banana Ridge is a 1942 British comedy film directed by Walter C. Mycroft and starring Robertson Hare, Alfred Drayton and Isabel Jeans. It was written by Lesley Storm, Mycroft and Ben Travers, based on the 1938 stage play of the same name by Travers. It was made at Welwyn Studios.

== Plot ==
Two colleagues come to worry that a mysterious young man may be their son from liaisons with the same woman during the First World War. They are persuaded to give him a job at "Banana Ridge" one of the company's rubber plantations in the Malay States. The young man's romance with the bosses' daughter threatens this plan, as does his mother's plan to reveal who is his real father.

== Cast ==
- Robertson Hare as Willoughby Pink
- Alfred Drayton as Digby Pound
- Isabel Jeans as Sue Long
- Nova Pilbeam as Cora Pound
- Adele Dixon as Mrs Ellie Pound
- Valentine Dunn as Mrs Pink
- Stewart Rome as Sir Ramsey Flight
- John Stuart as Chief Police Officer Staples
- Audrey Boyesas typist
- Patrick Kinsella as Jonesy
- Basil Lynn as Mason
- Gordon McLeod as Mr. Tope
- Mignon O'Doherty as Mrs. Bingley
- Ley On as Chinese 'boy'
- Wally Patch as police officer
- Lloyd Pearson as Mr. Bingley
- Charles Stewart as dance instructor
- Dulcie Gray in a bit part

== Production ==
Michael Denison accompanied his wife Dulcie Gray for her screen test for the film, which led some years later to his casting in his breakthrough role in My Brother Jonathan. Hare and Drayton appeared together in another comedy, Women Aren't Angels the following year.

== Reception ==
The Monthly Film Bulletin wrote: "An amusing story based on the play of the same name, reasonably well directed and produced with some nice work from Alfred Drayton as Mr. Pound, Robertson Hare as Mr. Pink, and particularly Isabel Jeans as Sue Long. The plantation sequences are effective."

Kine Weekly wrote: "Broad farcical comedy, adapted from the stage success, telling of a woman's exploitation of her Great War amatory escapades in the interest of her son. The humour, which, incidentally, turns on disputed paternity, springs from innuendo rather than action, but breezy teamwork by the inimitable Hare and Drayton keeps the fruity frolic on the move and within bounds. Capital star comedy bet for the masses."
