= Ben Travers =

English writer (1886–1980)

Ben Travers CBE AFC
- Travers in 1975
- Born: 12 November 1886; Hendon, London, England
- Died: 18 December 1980 (aged 94); London, England
- Occupations: Writer; playwright
- Notable work: Aldwych farces
- Spouse: Violet Mouncey (m. 1916)

Ben Travers CBE AFC (12 November 1886 – 18 December 1980) was an English writer. His output includes more than 20 plays, 30 screenplays, 5 novels, and 3 volumes of memoirs. He is most notable for his long-running series of farces first staged in the 1920s and 1930s at the Aldwych Theatre. Many of these were made into films and later television productions.

After working for some years in his family's wholesale grocery business, which he detested, Travers was given a job by the publisher John Lane in 1911. After service as a pilot in the First World War, he began to write novels and plays. He turned his 1921 novel, The Dippers, into a play that was first produced in the West End in 1922. His big break came in 1925, when the actor-manager Tom Walls bought the performing rights to his play A Cuckoo in the Nest, which ran for more than a year at the Aldwych. He followed this success with eight more farces for Walls and his team; the last in the series closed in 1933. Most of the farces were adapted for film in the 1930s and 1940s, with Travers writing the screenplays for eight of them.

After the Aldwych series came to a close, in 1935 Travers wrote a serious play with a religious theme. It was unsuccessful, and he returned to comedy. Of his later farces only one, Banana Ridge (1938), rivalled the runs of his 1920s hits; it was filmed in 1942. During the Second World War Travers served in the Royal Air Force, working in intelligence, and later served at the Ministry of Information, while producing two well-received plays.

Due to the war and the death of his wife, Travers had a fallow period, although he collaborated on a few revivals and adaptations of his earlier work. He returned to playwriting in 1968. He was inspired to write a new comedy in the early 1970s after the abolition of theatre censorship in Britain permitted him to write without evasion about sexual activities, one of his favourite topics. The resulting play, The Bed Before Yesterday (1975), presented when he was 89, was the longest-running of all his stage works, easily outplaying any of his Aldwych farces.

== Life and career ==
=== Early years ===
Ben Travers was born in the London borough of Hendon, the elder son and the second of the three children of Walter Francis Travers, a merchant, and his wife, Margaret Burges. He was educated at the Abbey School, Beckenham, and at Charterhouse. He did not greatly enjoy his schooldays and later declared that he had been "a complete failure at school". The only thing he enjoyed there was cricket, for which he had a lifelong enthusiasm, later writing a memoir focusing on his passion for the game, Ninety-four Declared: Cricket Reminiscences. When he was nine, his father took him to the Ashes match at the Oval. Eighty years later he recalled watching W. G. Grace and F. S. Jackson opening the batting for England with Ranjitsinhji coming in first wicket down: "I remember when Ranji came in to bat the crowd started singing; I think he only made 7; it was a very low scoring match." (Note: In fact Ranjitsinhji scored 8.)

Inspirations to the young Travers: clockwise from top left: W. G. Grace, Ranjitsinhji, Sarah Bernhardt, Lucien Guitry

Travers left Charterhouse in 1904 and was sent by his parents to live in Dresden, for a few months, to learn German. While he was there he saw performances by the leading French actors Sarah Bernhardt in La Tosca, and Lucien Guitry in Les affaires sont les affaires, which inspired him with a passion for the theatre. His parents were unimpressed by his ambition to become an actor; he was sent into the family business, the long-established wholesale grocery firm Joseph Travers & Sons Ltd, of which his father was a director. He found commercial life tedious and incomprehensible: "I had no more idea what it was all about then than I have now and vice versa." He served first at the firm's head office in Cannon Street in the City of London, which was dominated by dauntingly-bearded Victorian patriarchs. From there, to his and the patriarchs' relief, he was soon transferred to the company's offices in Singapore and then Malacca.

While at the Malacca outpost Travers had little work and much leisure; in the local library he found a complete set of the plays of Pinero. He later said he fell on them with rapturous excitement and found each volume "a guidebook to the technique of stagecraft." They rekindled his interest in the theatre, his earlier wish to be an actor now overtaken by his determination to be a dramatist. (Note: In later life Travers gave conflicting accounts of his early theatrical ambitions, saying on one occasion, "I knew from the time I was six I wanted to be a dramatist".) He later told Pinero that he had learnt more from him than from all other playwrights put together. His greatest lesson from Pinero was that "however absurd the incidents of a play they had to arise from a basis of reality. The people should never be mere grotesques. Ideally they should be as matter-of-fact – or apparently so – as the people across the road."

In 1908, after the death of his mother, Travers returned to London to keep his father company. He endured his work at the family firm for three more years until, in 1911, he met the publisher John Lane of the Bodley Head, who offered him a job as a publisher's reader. Lane's firm had been in existence for a little over twenty years and had an avant garde reputation; among Lane's first publications were The Yellow Book and Wilde's Salome. Travers worked for Lane for three years, during which he accompanied his employer on business trips to the US and Canada.

On the outbreak of the First World War, Travers joined the Royal Naval Air Service (RNAS). His service was eventful. He crashed several times and narrowly failed to shoot down a Zeppelin. He became a squadron commander, and when the RNAS merged with the Royal Flying Corps he transferred to the new Royal Air Force with the rank of major in 1918. He served in south Russia during the Allied intervention in the Russian Civil War, in 1919, and received the Air Force Cross in 1920.

In April 1916 Travers married Violet Mouncey (d. 1951), the only child of Captain D. W B. Mouncey, of the Leicestershire Regiment, and granddaughter of Sir James Longden. They went on to have three children - Josephine, Benjamin and Daniel ('Burtie').

=== Novelist and playwright ===
Scene from The Dippers, 1922

With the security of his wife's income, Travers determined to earn his living as a writer when he was demobilised from the RAF. He and his wife settled in Somerset, and he started to write. His first attempt was a farce about a lawyer who finds himself mistaken at a country house full of strangers for half of a husband-and-wife jazz dance act. While writing it he decided to turn it into a novel, The Dippers, which was accepted by John Lane and published in 1921. The reviews were good. The Daily Chronicle noted "an amount of clever writing and character study that the humorous novel rarely gets … as clever a piece of comedy as we have read for some time". Travers then turned the novel back into a farce and sent it to the actor-manager Sir Charles Hawtrey. After a tour that included eight large towns and cities, Hawtrey brought the play into the West End in 1922. The reviews were mixed: The Manchester Guardian praised the piece, and its star Cyril Maude; The Observer was scathing about both. The Times considered the play "neatly contrived and often brilliantly phrased" and praised the cast and the author – "such good company and in a play so amusing". The play had a moderately successful London run of 173 performances. Travers's next stage work was less successful: he wrote an English adaptation of Franz Lehár's 1923 operetta Der Libellentanz. The music received mild praise, but the libretto did not. The piece ran for just over three months.

Travers followed The Dippers with another farcical novel, A Cuckoo in the Nest, published in 1922. Again reviewers praised its humour, and again Travers turned it into a playscript. The actor Lawrence Grossmith spotted the dramatic possibilities of this story, and he acquired the performing rights to the play. Before Grossmith had time to produce the piece, he had an offer from the actor-manager Tom Walls to buy the rights. Walls was in need of a replacement for his current hit farce, It Pays to Advertise, which was nearing the end of a long run at the Aldwych Theatre.

=== Aldwych farces ===
With Travers's agreement, Grossmith sold the rights to A Cuckoo in the Nest to Walls, and the play opened at the Aldwych in July 1925. The leading lady was Yvonne Arnaud, and the two leading men were Walls and Ralph Lynn. They were supported by a team of players who became part of a regular company at the Aldwych for the rest of the 1920s and into the 1930s: Robertson Hare, Mary Brough and Gordon James, joined in subsequent productions by Winifred Shotter (in place of Arnaud) and Ethel Coleridge. (Note: The Oxford Dictionary of National Biography incorrectly states that Travers himself was in the cast of A Cuckoo in the Nest. The cast list was printed in The Times, the day after the premiere, and does not include Travers.) The play was an immediate success and ran for 376 performances.

Walls, splendidly right when he chose to act – which was not always – could be a testing director; Travers knew how to humour him, and there was no trouble whatever with the buoyant, knuckle-gnawing, monocle-dropping Ralph Lynn, an unexampled farceur.

— The Times, 19 December 1980

During the next seven years there were ten more Aldwych farces; Travers wrote eight of them: Rookery Nook (1926), Thark (1927), Plunder (1928), A Cup of Kindness (1929), A Night Like This (1930), Turkey Time (1931), Dirty Work (1932), and A Bit of a Test (1933). It took Travers some time to establish a satisfactory working relationship with Walls, whom he found difficult as a manager and distressingly unprepared as an actor. In the early days he also had reservations about the other star of the company, Ralph Lynn, who initially ad-libbed too much for the author's taste. Travers noted that the ad-libbing diminished as he came to anticipate and include in his scripts "the sort of thing Ralph himself would have said in the circumstances". Though the main parts in the Aldwych plays were written to fit the members of the regular company, Travers varied their roles to avoid monotony. He also varied the themes of his plots. Thark was a spoof of haunted house melodramas; Plunder featured burglary and violent death (in a way that pre-echoed Joe Orton), A Cup of Kindness was what he called "a Romeo and Juliet story of the suburbs"; and A Bit of a Test had a cricketing theme at the time of the controversial "Bodyline" series.

Travers's biographer H Montgomery Hyde records that between 1926 and 1932 the Aldwych box office grossed £1,500,000 in receipts, and the aggregate number of performances of the nine Travers farces totalled nearly 2,700. During the 1930s, film versions of ten of the twelve Aldwych farces were made, mostly directed by Walls. Travers wrote the screenplays for eight of them.

=== Later 1930s ===
Yvonne Printemps starred in Travers's 1936 O Mistress Mine

After the Aldwych series finished Travers wrote his first serious play, Chastity, my Brother (1936), based on the life of St Paul. To his sadness, it ran for only two weeks. No author was named for the piece, but it was an open secret that Travers was the author. The Times dismissed it on those grounds; Ivor Brown in The Observer congratulated Travers and deplored the snobbish suggestion that a writer of successful farces could have nothing of value to say on religious matters. All his life Travers held strong religious views and was a regular communicant of the Church of England; his views on chastity, however, were unorthodox: "sex is nature's act – God's will", and he admitted to wholesale promiscuity. (Note: Less than a year before Travers died, an interviewer asked him how many women he had been to bed with. "He coughed, spluttered, looked at the fingers of one hand then at the other, and then leaned forward asking how many weeks I had to spare.")

After the failure of Chastity, my Brother, Travers returned to comedy, though not immediately to farce. Later in 1936 his O Mistress Mine was a light Ruritanian vehicle for Yvonne Printemps. He returned to farce with Banana Ridge (1938) in which Robertson Hare starred with Alfred Drayton. It was set in Malaya, and turned on which of two middle-aged pillars of Empire was the father of the young hero. Travers himself played the part of Wun, a servant; his lines in colloquial Malay, remembered from his Malacca days, were improvised and sometimes took his colleagues by surprise. The play ran for 291 performances, bettering the runs of the last six Aldwych farces.

=== Second World War and postwar ===
During the Second World War Travers rejoined the RAF, working in intelligence. He was given the rank of Squadron leader and was later attached to the Ministry of Information as air adviser on censorship. He had two plays staged during the war. Spotted Dick (1939), again starring Hare and Drayton, was a farce about insurance fraud. She Follows Me About (1943) had Hare as a harried vicar coping with mischievous Waafs and a bogus bishop. The Observer commented, "the third act is a tumultuous affair, with all four doors and a staircase in action at once."

In the postwar years Travers wrote a new farce for Lynn and Hare. Outrageous Fortune was described by The Manchester Guardian as "an elaborate tangle about stolen ration cards and a Hertfordshire manor house and country police ... very laughable in its own way." In 1951 Travers wrote another farce for Lynn and Hare, Wild Horses, about the ownership of a valuable picture. It was his last new play for more than a decade. In 1951 Violet Travers died of cancer. Travers felt the bereavement deeply. In Hyde's words, Travers lost most of his old zest for writing and spent more and more time in travelling and staying with friends in Malaya. She Follows Me About was revived at the Aldwych in 1952, and a revised version of O Mistress Mine was staged in the provinces in 1953 as The Nun's Unveiling. Travers collaborated on the screenplay of Fast and Loose (1954), based on A Cuckoo in the Nest.

=== Last years ===
In 1968 Travers returned to playwriting with a new farce, Corker's End, which was produced at the Yvonne Arnaud Theatre, Guildford. The Times commented, "Some of his jokes, which always tended to be outrageous, are perhaps a little more outspoken than they used to be, but nothing essential has changed. Those who care for farce will enjoy themselves for exactly that reason." In 1970 BBC television broadcast seven Travers plays: Rookery Nook, A Cuckoo in the Nest, Turkey Time, A Cup of Kindness, Plunder, Dirty Work and She Follows Me About. At the age of 83 Travers rewrote the plays for the BBC to concentrate on plot twists and verbal misunderstandings, rather than the high-speed action and split-second timing that characterised the original stage versions.

Travers should be regarded as an important figure post-Pinero and pre-Orton, and certainly one of the most skilled of British farceurs

— Oxford Dictionary of National Biography

After the abolition in 1968 of theatre censorship in Britain, Travers was for the first time able to write about sexual matters without discreet allusion or innuendo. The Bed Before Yesterday (1975) depicts a middle-aged woman discovering the pleasure of sex, to the consternation of some who know her and the delight of others. Joan Plowright played the central character with John Moffatt, Helen Mirren and Royce Mills in the main supporting roles. It received enthusiastic notices and ran for more than 500 performances, far outstripping the original runs of any of Travers's Aldwych farces.

In his ninetieth year Travers had the uncommon distinction of having three of his plays running simultaneously in London; as well as The Bed Before Yesterday at the Lyric, there were revivals of Plunder at the National with Frank Finlay and Dinsdale Landen, and Banana Ridge at the Savoy with Robert Morley and George Cole. He wrote two further plays, After You with the Milk and Malacca Linda, in which he revisited the colonial Malaya of his youth. At 2013 neither has been staged in the West End.

Travers died in London at the age of 94.

== Honours and memorials ==
Travers served as prime warden of the Worshipful Company of Fishmongers (1946) and as vice-president of Somerset County Cricket Club. He received the CBE in the 1976 Birthday Honours. In the same year he was presented with a Special Award at the Evening Standard Awards for his services to the theatre.

A theatre named in Travers's honour has been built at his old school, Charterhouse. Travers laid the foundation stone in 1980, and the first production in the completed theatre was Thark in January 1984.

== Works ==
Source: Gale Contemporary Authors Online.

=== Novels and short stories ===
- The Dippers, Lane, 1921
- A Cuckoo in the Nest, Lane, 1922
- Rookery Nook, Lane, 1923
- Mischief, Doubleday, 1925
- The Collection Today (short stories), Lane, 1928
- Game and Rubber and The Dunkum Jane (in single volume with The Dippers), Lane, 1932
- Hyde Side Up, Lane, 1933

=== Memoirs ===
- Vale of Laughter, John Lane, 1930, Bles, 1957.
- A-sitting on a Gate, W. H. Allen, 1978.
- Ninety-four Declared: Cricket Reminiscences, foreword by Brian Johnston, Elm Tree Books, 1981.

=== Plays ===
	Premiere	Published	Notes
The Dippers	1922		adapted from Travers's 1921 novel of the same title
The Three Graces	1924		adapted from a play by Carlo Lombardo and A. M. Willner
A Cuckoo in the Nest	1925	Bickers, 1939	adapted from his novel of the same title
Rookery Nook	1926	Bickers, 1930	adapted from his novel of the same title
Thark	1927	Samuel French, 1927	adapted in 2013 by Clive Francis, published by Oberon Books
Plunder	1928	Bickers, 1931	
Mischief	1928		adapted from his novel of the same title
A Cup of Kindness	1929	Bickers, 1934	
A Night like This	1930		
Turkey Time	1931	Bickers, 1934	
Dirty Work	1932		
A Bit of a Test	1933		
Chastity, My Brother	1936		
O Mistress Mine	1936		
Banana Ridge	1938	Bickers, 1939	
Spotted Dick	1939		
She Follows Me About	1943	Samuel French, 1945	
Outrageous Fortune	1947	Samuel French, 1948	
Runaway Victory	1949 (Brighton)		
Wild Horses	1952	Samuel French, 1953	
Nun's Veiling	1953 (Bromley)	Samuel French, 1956	revised version of O Mistress Mine
Corker's End	1968 (Guildford)		
The Bed Before Yesterday	1975	Samuel French, 1975	
After You with the Milk		Samuel French, 1985	
Malacca Linda			

=== Selected screenplays ===
Title	Studio	Year	Notes
Rookery Nook	British and Dominions	1930	released in the US by Metro-Goldwyn-Mayer as One Embarrassing Night
Plunder	British and Dominions	1931	
Thark	British and Dominions	1932	
A Night like This	British and Dominions	1932	with W P Lipscomb
A Cuckoo in the Nest	Gaumont-British	1933	with A R Rawlinson
Just My Luck	British and Dominions	1933	adapted from H F Maltby's Aldwych farce Fifty-Fifty
Turkey Time	Gaumont	1933	
Up to the Neck	British and Dominions	1933	
Lady in Danger	Gaumont	1934	adapted from his play O Mistress Mine
A Cup of Kindness	Gaumont	1934	
Dirty Work	Gaumont	1934	
Fighting Stock	Gainsborough Pictures/Gaumont	1935	based on the Travers play of the same name
Stormy Weather	Gainsborough/Gaumont	1935	
Foreign Affaires	Gainsborough/Gaumont	1935	
Pot Luck	Gainsborough/Gaumont	1936	loosely based on the Travers play, A Night Like This
Dishonour Bright	Capital/General Films	1936	
For Valour	Capital/General Films	1937	
Second Best Bed	Capital/General Films	1937	based on a Travers story
Old Iron	British Lion	1938	
So This Is London	Twentieth Century-Fox	1939	with Douglas Furber and others, based on George M Cohan's play
Banana Ridge	Pathé	1941	with Walter C Mycroft and Lesley Storm
Uncle Silas	Two Cities/General Films	1947	adapted from Sheridan Le Fanu's novel Uncle Silas released in the US as The Inheritance
Fast and Loose	Group/General Films	1954	With A R Rawlinson; adapted from Travers's A Cuckoo in the Nest

=== Television plays ===
- Potter, 1948
- Picture Page, 1949
- Seven of the Aldwych farces, 1970

=== Adaptations by others ===
- The Chance of a Night Time, 1931 adapted from The Dippers
- Mischief, 1931, adapted by W. P. Lipscomb
- Plunder, 1931, adapted by W. P. Lipscomb
- Popkiss, 1972, musical adaptation of Rookery Nook, adapted by Michael Ashton, with music by John Addison and David Heneker
- Yo robo, tu chantajeas, ella estafa y, ademas, un muerto, 1984, TV adaptation in Spanish of Plunder, adapted by Esteve Duran.

== Sources ==
- Gaye, Freda, ed. (1967). Who's Who in the Theatre (fourteenth ed.). London: Sir Isaac Pitman and Sons. OCLC 5997224.
- Travers, Ben (1957). Vale of laughter, an autobiography. London: G Bles. OCLC 5285597.
- Travers, Ben (1978). A-sitting on a gate – autobiography. London: W H Allen. ISBN 0491022751.
