= A Cuckoo in the Nest =

1925 British comedy play

Yvonne Arnaud, Ralph Lynn and Mary Brough in the 1925 production

A Cuckoo in the Nest is a farce by the English playwright Ben Travers. It was first given at the Aldwych Theatre, London, the second in the series of twelve Aldwych farces presented by the actor-manager Tom Walls at the theatre between 1923 and 1933. Several of the cast formed the regular core cast for the later Aldwych farces. The plot concerns two friends, a man and a woman, who are each married to other people. While travelling together, they are obliged by circumstances to share a hotel bedroom. Everyone else assumes the worst, but the two travellers are able to prove their innocence.

The piece opened on 22 July 1925 and ran for 376 performances. Travers made a film adaptation, which Walls directed in 1933, with most of the leading members of the stage cast reprising their roles.

== Background ==
The actor-manager Tom Walls, initially together with Leslie Henson, produced the series of Aldwych farces, nearly all written by Ben Travers, starring Walls and his co-star Ralph Lynn, who specialised in playing "silly ass" characters. Walls assembled a regular company of actors to fill the supporting roles. For the first few productions, the company included Yvonne Arnaud as the leading lady; Robertson Hare, as a figure of put-upon respectability; Mary Brough in eccentric old lady roles; and the saturnine Gordon James.

Walls and his team had enjoyed a substantial hit at the Aldwych, with It Pays to Advertise (1923), which had run for 598 performances. For this second Aldwych production, Walls acquired the rights to an unproduced farce by Ben Travers. Three brothers appeared in this production: Gordon James was the stage name adopted by Ralph Lynn's elder brother Sydney. Their younger brother Hastings Lynn became known for playing Ralph's original roles in Australia and New Zealand.

== Original cast ==
From left: Major Bone, Peter, Marguerite, Claude Hickett and Barbara Wykeham, 1925 original cast

- Rawlins, maid at the Wykehams' flat – Ena Mason
- Mrs Bone – Grace Edwin
- Major George Bone – Tom Walls
- Barbara Wykeham – Madge Saunders
- Gladys, maid at the "Stag and Hunt" – Rene Vivian
- Alfred, barman at the "Stag and Hunt" – Roger Livesey
- Marguerite Hickett – Yvonne Arnaud
- Peter Wykeham – Ralph Lynn
- Noony, a villager – Gordon James
- Mrs Spoker – Mary Brough
- The Rev Cathcart Sloley-Jones – Robertson Hare
- Claude Hickett, MP – Hastings Lynn
- Chauffeur – Joe Grande

== Synopsis ==
=== Act I ===
Scene I – At the Wykehams' flat, Kensington, Tuesday evening

Marguerite Hickett (Yvonne Arnaud) and her dog

Barbara Wykeham's parents, Major and Mrs Bone arrive. They have had a telegram from Barbara, reading "Be at my flat at seven, have had most startling and terrible experience". Their mystification is increased when Rawlins, the maid, tells them that Barbara has sent her a message that she would be returning alone. Rawlins adds that earlier in the day the Wykehams left together for Paddington Station en route for Somerset, but that Peter Wykeham returned to the flat later, not with his wife but with a young woman with a foreign accent. Finally, she adds, Peter rang a garage and hired a car in which he and the young woman drove off, with a little dog. Barbara enters. She tells the Bones that at Paddington Peter had missed the train because he was delayed in conversation with a young woman on the platform when the train pulled out, taking Barbara to Bristol, the first stop, where she got off and hurried back to London. Major Bone thinks there is some innocent explanation, but Barbara and her mother believe that Peter has run off with the unknown foreigner. They telephone the garage and learn that the car has been reported as broken down at a village called Maiden Blotton. Mrs Bone insists on setting off at once for Maiden Blotton to catch the guilty pair in flagrante. The Major is at first reluctant to accompany her, but on realising that he may be called on to intrude into an attractive young woman's bedroom he changes his mind.

Scene 2 – Parlour of the "Stag and Hunt" Inn, Maiden Blotton, Tuesday night

Peter and the young foreign woman enter. She is Marguerite Hickett, now the wife of an MP but once a very close friend of Peter's. They met on the station platform and were so deep in reminiscence that they both missed the same train, on which their spouses travelled without them. The inn is run by the formidable, prudish Mrs Spoker. Only one bedroom is available, and as it is very clear that Mrs Spoker will not admit an unmarried couple, Peter and Marguerite check in as husband and wife. This deception has to be perpetuated publicly when they meet another guest at the inn, the Rev Cathcart Sloley-Jones, who knows Marguerite; she introduces Peter as her husband, Claude Hickett. At Mrs Spoker's insistence, Pansy, Marguerite's little dog, is banished to sleep in the stables, and Peter and Marguerite retire to their bedroom. He tries to sneak downstairs again to sleep in the parlour, but finds it locked, and has no alternative but to rejoin Marguerite upstairs.

=== Act II ===
Number Two room of the "Stag and Hunt", Tuesday night

Peter cedes the bed to Marguerite, while he makes several unsuccessful attempts to find a tolerably comfortable spot on the bedroom floor, which has "a triple-direction draught". The dog has been accommodated in the stables, but she howls; Marguerite persuades Peter to bring Pansy inside the inn. It is pouring with rain, the dog runs away, and Peter returns thoroughly wet, and faces the disapproval of Mrs Spoker. The Bones burst in, surprising Peter and Marguerite, the former wearing a towel in place of his rain-soaked trousers. Mrs Spoker, outraged, insists that all four must spend what remains of the night downstairs in the parlour.

=== Act III ===
Tom Walls as Major Bone with port decanter

Parlour of the "Stag and Hunt", Wednesday morning

Major Bone advises Peter on what to say when Barbara arrives, to assuage her suspicion. Marguerite's husband meets Sloley-Jones who thoroughly confuses him with talk of meeting "Mr and Mrs Hickett" the previous evening. Hickett is devoted to Marguerite and is easily convinced of her fidelity. Barbara is less easily persuaded. Peter at first spins her a yarn to the effect that he drove on to the next town, leaving Marguerite overnight at the "Stag and Hunt". When that is shown up as a lie, Marguerite makes a wildly exaggerated show of passion for Peter, so over-the-top that it is obvious there is actually nothing between them. Barbara recognises the truth, both couples are reconciled, and Marguerite's little dog is restored to her.

== Reception ==
The Times praised the performances and the play: "Let it be added that, though the clou of the farce is a 'bedroom scene', the entire entertainment is the pink of propriety. By the end of it the audience was thoroughly exhausted with laughter". The Manchester Guardian said that Travers "has told an old story so well it sparkles brilliantly as new. ... The play is an actor's comedy, and described as a 'misadventure in three acts'. Would that all misadventures were as funny." Looking back at the Aldwych farces in 1962, J. C. Trewin considered the pinnacle to be "Lynn trying to sleep beneath a washstand in A Cuckoo in the Nest and his manifold agonies as he reeled, writhed and plaited himself in coils through the watches of the night."

Travers himself was relieved to find the production to his taste. He had not previously thought highly of either Walls or Lynn: "The father-in-law who was the leading support character in the Cuckoo called for a straight comedy actor. ... The idea of Tom Walls red-nosing and reeling his way through it dismayed me. [Lynn] typified the contemporary monocled '[k]nut'. ... Wouldn't this mean that the conscientious young husband of my farce would be caricatured and nincompooped into fatuous unreality?" Travers was pleased to be proved wrong: "The glorious restrained study that Tom made of the befuddled Major Bone surprised me as much as it gratified me." Of Lynn he wrote, "I was about to join forces with the greatest farce actor of our time."

== Revivals and adaptations ==
In 1933 Walls directed a film adaptation of the play. Travers wrote the screenplay, and Walls, Lynn, Arnaud, Hare and Brough reprised their old stage roles.

The play was not revived in London for more than thirty years, until Anthony Page directed a production for the English Stage Company at the Royal Court in 1964. It starred Arthur Lowe and Nicol Williamson in the Walls and Lynn roles, with Beatrix Lehmann as the landlady, Ann Beach as Marguerite, and Rosalind Knight and John Osborne as the pursuing spouses.

The BBC televised a production in September 1970 with Lowe and Richard Briers in the Walls and Lynn roles. The BBC broadcast a radio version of the play on Christmas Day 1983, with Freddie Jones and Ian Lavender in the leads, and Joan Hickson, Margaret Tyzack and Phoebe Nicholls in the cast.
