= Robertson Hare =

English actor (1891–1979)

Robertson Hare as the Ven. Henry Blunt, Archdeacon of St. Ogg's, in All Gas and Gaiters, late 1960s

John Robertson Hare, OBE (17 December 1891 – 25 January 1979) was an English actor, who came to fame in the Aldwych farces. He is remembered by more recent audiences for his performances as the Archdeacon in the popular BBC sitcom, All Gas and Gaiters.

Short in stature and of unheroic appearance, Hare made his stage career in character roles. From his early days as an actor he was cast as older men. One of his favourite parts, which he played in the provinces before achieving West End success, was "Grumpy", a retired lawyer, in which he toured before the First World War.

After war service in the army, Hare got his big break. He was cast in a long-running farce with Ralph Lynn and Tom Walls. His meek and put-upon character was repeated in various incarnations in the eleven Aldwych farces presented by Walls between 1923 and 1933. He also appeared in film versions of most of the farces. After the Aldwych series came to an end, Hare continued to be cast in similar roles in new plays by Ben Travers and many others.

Occasionally Hare took a break from farce, appearing in revue with Benny Hill and in a musical with Frankie Howerd. His final major role was on television in the late 1960s, as the Archdeacon of St Ogg's in the BBC comedy series All Gas and Gaiters.

== Life and career ==
=== Early years ===
Hare was born in Islington, London, the middle child and eldest son of Frank Homer Hare, an accountant, and his wife, Louisa Mary, née Robertson. He was educated at Margate College in Kent and then studied drama with the actor and educator Cairns James.

In 1911 Hare made his professional stage debut, playing the Duke of Gallminster in a provincial production of The Bear Leaders. The following year he made his London début as one of the crowd in Gilbert Murray's version of Oedipus Rex at the Royal Opera House, Covent Garden. In 1913 he had his first role in a West End production, as Kaufman in a detective play, The Scarlet Band, at the Comedy Theatre. He then toured the provinces for a number of years. His first leading part was the title role of Grumpy, by Horace Hodges and T. Wigney Percyval, which was one of his favourite roles. Even at this early stage of his career Hare was playing old men: "Grumpy" is an irascible retired lawyer. In December 1915 he married (Alice) Irene Mewton (1890/91–1969); they had one daughter.

=== Aldwych farce ===
After war service with the army in France, Hare resumed his acting career, and came to the notice of the West End public as James Chesterman in a new farce, Tons of Money, in which he and the actor-manager Tom Walls played supporting roles, with Ralph Lynn in the lead. The play ran for nearly two years, after which Walls recruited Lynn and Hare to join him in a series of new farces at the Aldwych Theatre. There were eleven plays in this series, which came to be known as Aldwych farces; they played continuously from 1923 to 1933. Hare played in them all; his roles were: William Smith (It Pays to Advertise); The Rev Cathcart Sloley-Jones (A Cuckoo in the Nest); Harold Twine (Rookery Nook); Hook (Thark); Oswald Veal (Plunder); Ernest Ramsbotham (A Cup of Kindness); Miles Tuckett (A Night Like This); Edwin Stoatt (Turkey Time); Clement Peck (Dirty Work); Montague Trigg (Fifty-Fifty); and Augustus Pogson (A Bit of a Test).

His biographer, Eric Midwinter, writes of Hare's characters in these farces:

Hare created a cosily familiar style and was identified completely with, in effect, one part, that of the prissy little man, constantly in a state of unease and agitation, invariably sucked into some maelstrom of domestic upset and dislocation, unfailingly compromised and often trouserless. The bald dome, with brows furrowing anxiously beneath it; the spectacles, emphasizing the shock and bewilderment with which he responded to his travails; the jerky, staccato movements as his distress grew – these made him a highly recognisable stage figure. In concert with the worldly wise Tom Walls and the affable Ralph Lynn … he became one of the premier exponents of English farce.

=== Later years ===
Hare appeared in films of most of the Aldwych farces, and played more than a dozen film roles in the post-war years. For the rest of his stage career he was usually cast in similar roles. After the last Aldwych farce in 1933 he played his customary types in more than twenty new farces over the next three decades. Among his most successful creations of this kind was Willoughby Pink in Travers's Banana Ridge in 1938, in which he played a British Empire builder with a dubious past. In 1943 he appeared in a wartime-set farce She Follows Me About by Ben Travers. In 1947 he starred at the Apollo Theatre in She Wanted a Cream Front Door, 1954 saw him in the political farce The Party Spirit; in 1956 he was in John Dighton's Man Alive! at the Aldwych. The same year he appeared with Cicely Courtneidge in the long-running The Bride and the Bachelor at the Duchess Theatre. He made a few appearances in revue: his first was Fine Fettle (1959) in which he appeared with Benny Hill and Shani Wallis. In 1963 Hare played in a long-running stage musical, A Funny Thing Happened on the Way to the Forum (762 performances), in which he was cast as Erronius to Frankie Howerd's Pseudolus. He went on to be a regular cast member in Howerd’s 1966 BBC radio show.

In the 1960s Hare toured in Arsenic and Old Lace. In 1962 he briefly escaped type-casting, appearing with Wilfrid Hyde White in a comedy film Crooks Anonymous, in which he played an old lag, his familiar bald head disguised under a wig. In 1968 he joined Naunton Wayne in Oh, Clarence!, an adaptation of a P. G. Wodehouse Blandings novel, which he played in London, on tour in the provinces, and in South Africa. He reached a new public in the late 1960s in a television series, All Gas and Gaiters. He played the Archdeacon of St. Ogg's, the Ven Henry Blunt. His co-stars were William Mervyn as the Rt Rev Cuthbert Hever, Bishop of St Ogg's, Derek Nimmo as the Rev Mervyn Noote, the Bishop's chaplain, and John Barron as the Very Rev Lionel Pugh-Critchley, Dean of St Ogg's. George Melly wrote:

Most weeks the plot hangs on the rivalry between the pompous but cosy Bishop and the austere, perfectionist Dean. Derek Nimmo does his clerical silly ass and Robertson Hare is a sherry-loving rather simple-minded Archdeacon … Hare is not only innately comic in himself but manages to suggest a certain depth in a character who on the page can hardly exist.

Hare was awarded the OBE in 1979, shortly before his death. He died in London at the age of 87.

== Filmography ==
- Rookery Nook (1930) - Harold Twine
- On Approval (1930) - Hedworth
- Plunder (1930) - Oswald Veal
- Tons of Money (1930) - Chesterman
- A Night like This (1932) - Miles Tuckett
- Thark (1932) - Hook
- It's a Boy (1933) - Allister
- Friday the Thirteenth (1933) - Ralph Lightfoot
- A Cuckoo in the Nest (1933) - Rev. Sloley Jones
- Turkey Time (1933) - Edwin Stoatt
- Just My Luck (1933) - Trigg
- A Cup of Kindness (1934) - Ernest Ramsbottom
- Are You a Mason? (1934) - Amos Bloodqood
- Dirty Work (1934) - Clement Peck
- Car of Dreams (1935) - Henry Butterworth
- Oh, Daddy! (1935) - Rupert Boddy
- Fighting Stock (1935) - Duck
- Stormy Weather (1935) - Mr. Bullock
- Foreign Affaires (1935) - Mr. Hardy Hornett
- Pot Luck (1936) - Mr. Pye
- You Must Get Married (1936) - Percy Phut
- Jack of All Trades (1936) - Lionel Fitch
- O.H.M.S. (1937) - (uncredited)
- Aren't Men Beasts! (1937) - Herbert Holly
- A Spot of Bother (1938) - Dear Mr. Binky Rudd
- So This Is London (1939) - Henry Honeycutt
- Banana Ridge (1942) - Willoughby Pink
- Women Aren't Angels (1943) - Wilmer Popday
- He Snoops to Conquer (1944) - Sir Timothy Strawbridge
- Things Happen at Night (1948) - Vincent Ebury
- One Wild Oat (1951) - Humphrey Proudfoot
- The Magic Box (1951) - Sitter in Bath Studio
- Our Girl Friday (1953) - Professor Gibble
- My Wife's Family (1956) - Noah Parker
- Three Men in a Boat (1956) - Photographer
- Seven Keys (1961) - Mr. Piggott
- The Night We Got the Bird (1961) - Doctor Vincent (uncredited)
- Out of the Shadow (1961) - Ronald Fortescue
- The Young Ones (1961) - Chauffeur
- Crooks Anonymous (1962) - Grimsdale
- Hotel Paradiso (1966) - Duke
- Salt and Pepper (1968) - Dove
- Raising the Roof (1972) - Old Gent (final film role)
