= Ralph Lynn =

English actor (1882–1962)

Lynn in the early 1930s

Ralph Clifford Lynn (8 March 1882 – 8 August 1962) was an English actor who had a 60-year career, and is best remembered for playing comedy parts in the Aldwych farces first on stage and then in film.

Lynn became an actor at the age of 18 and very soon began to be cast in knut or "silly ass" roles. He played such parts as a supporting actor for more than two decades until 1922, when he was cast in the lead of a new West End farce, Tons of Money, in which he achieved immediate stardom. After the success of this play, its co-producer, the actor-manager Tom Walls, leased the Aldwych Theatre in London, where for the next ten years he and Lynn co-starred in a series of successful farces, most of which were written for them by Ben Travers.

Many of the Aldwych farces were made into films starring Lynn and Walls, and the two were ranked among the most popular British film actors of the 1930s. He continued his stage career during and after the Second World War, scoring another hit in London and on tour with Is your Honeymoon Really Necessary? (1944). He continued to play in both new works by Travers and others, and in revivals of his earlier successes, and made his last London appearance in 1958.

== Life and career ==
Lynn was born in Salford, Lancashire, the son of Gordon James Lynn, an insurance manager, and his wife, Janet née Thomas.

In 1900 Lynn made his stage debut at Wigan in The King of Terrors. He spent his first 14 years as an actor performing in the British provinces and in the United States; he appeared at the Colonial Theatre, New York, in May 1913, as Algy Slowman in a revival of The Purple Lady. He made his first appearance on the London stage at the Empire Theatre in October 1914, as Montague Mayfair in By Jingo, If We Do—!, a revue by Arthur Wimperis and Hartley Carrick with music by Herman Finck. The Observer said of him, "We have not, to our knowledge, seen Mr. Ralph Lynn before; but Mr. Lynn is a deceptive player. To begin with, you think he is going to be merely the usual '[k]nut'. As the piece goes on he proves himself a true comedian."

In 1920 Lynn married the actress Gladys Miles; they had a son and a daughter. He continued his theatre career in mostly "silly ass" supporting roles, in London and in the provinces, until he achieved stardom in 1922, when Leslie Henson and Tom Walls cast him in Tons of Money, a farce by Will Evans and Arthur Valentine, which ran for two years at the Shaftesbury Theatre. Lynn's character adopted three different personas during the play, all conniving to acquire and keep a large financial legacy. The Times commented:

Mr Ralph Lynn achieves a great triumph in his triple character, and alike as himself, as a rough diamond from Mexico, and as a naughty curate, he is extremely amusing. He is hardly ever off the stage, and to him in a great measure the success of the play should be due.

Walls played a small role in the production, as did the young Robertson Hare. The critic Sheridan Morley wrote, "the team of Walls, Hare, and Lynn was thus created, one which was to stay together for the next eleven years."

=== Aldwych farces ===
I have never seen or heard of any actor in any field with such an instinctive and unerring gift of timing".

— Ben Travers

For their next production, It Pays to Advertise (1924) by Roi Cooper Megrue and Walter Hackett, the team of Walls, Hare and Lynn moved to the Aldwych Theatre. Most of their plays, which quickly came to be known as the Aldwych farces, were written by Ben Travers. At first he was wary about Lynn, thinking his "silly ass" persona unsuited to the conscientious and on the whole sensible character he was to play in the first of Travers's Aldwych farces. He was also concerned that in rehearsal Lynn ad-libbed too much. But Travers quickly changed his mind and concluded that Lynn was "the greatest farce actor of our time"; the ad-libbing diminished as Travers came to anticipate and include in his scripts "the sort of thing Ralph himself would have said in the circumstances".

Over the next ten years there were twelve Aldwych farces, occupying the theatre continuously, in all of which Lynn starred. Travers, who wrote all but three of them, had occasional difficulties with Walls, whose professional discipline left something to be desired, but he found Lynn to be the ultimate professional:

He was never satisfied as long as there was a single line in any of his scenes which wasn't right. All through the run of a farce he would worry and experiment until he got the thing to his liking. In those moments, there were none of the waggeries and wisecracks of his leisure hours; we were concentrating on the solemn problems of creating laughter. Nobody ever appreciated so well as Ralph how intensely serious is the job of being funny.

Lynn first appeared in films in 1929 in Peace and Quiet, a short filmed excerpt of a Ronald Jeans revue. In 1930 he made his first full-length film, Rookery Nook, an adaptation of the Aldwych farce of the same name, directed by Walls, with the same cast as the stage production. Further filmed versions of the farces followed: Plunder (1931), Thark (1932), A Cuckoo in the Nest (1933) Turkey Time (1933), A Cup of Kindness (1934) and Dirty Work (1934). Travers also wrote some original screen plays for the team, such as Foreign Affaires (1935) and Pot Luck (1936 – loosely based on On Such a Night); he also adapted the works of others: Just My Luck (1933, from a play by H. F. Maltby) and Summer Lightning (1933, from P. G. Wodehouse's novel of the same name). Other films starring Lynn included In the Soup (1936) and All In (1936). In the first half of the 1930s, Lynn and Walls regularly appeared in the lists of the top ten British film stars. Walls usually outranked Lynn in the top ratings, because, in the words of the critic Jeffrey Richards, "everyone warmed to the old reprobate [Walls] whereas the 'silly ass' was not to everyone's taste."

=== Later years ===
He appeared at Aldwych in Vernon Sylvaine's 1940 farce Nap Hand. Lynn's last big hit play was Is your Honeymoon Really Necessary? by E. Vivian Tidmarsh (1944), of which he was producer as well as star. It ran in London for more than two years and for two more years on tour. After the Second World War, by which time Walls was dead, Lynn teamed up again with Robertson Hare for two more Travers farces, Outrageous Fortune (1947) and Wild Horses (1952), which were successful without being smash hits. In 1954 he starred with Hare in The Party Spirit, at the Piccadilly Theatre. Lynn successfully toured the provinces in revivals of his earlier London farces until the last few years of his life. His last London performance was in 1958.

Lynn died in Surrey in 1962 at the age of 80.

=== Family ===
Lynn's elder brother, Sydney, professionally known as Gordon James, was also an actor; the brothers frequently appeared together on stage and on screen. Their younger brother Hastings Lynn became known for playing Ralph's original roles in Australia and New Zealand.

His grand niece was the actress Ann Lynn.

== Filmography ==
- Rookery Nook (1930)
- Tons of Money (1930)
- Plunder (1931)
- Mischief (1931)
- The Chance of a Night Time (1931)
- A Night Like This (1932)
- Thark (1932)
- A Cuckoo in the Nest (1933)
- Summer Lightning (1933)
- Turkey Time (1933)
- Up to the Neck (1933)
- Just My Luck (1933)
- Dirty Work (1934)
- A Cup of Kindness (1934)
- Fighting Stock (1935)
- Stormy Weather (1935)
- Foreign Affaires (1935)
- All In (1936)
- Pot Luck (1936)
- In the Soup (1936)
- For Valour (1937)
