= Turkey Time (play) =

Play written by Ben Travers

Ralph Lynn and Tom Walls in Turkey Time, 1931

Turkey Time is a farce by Ben Travers. It was one of the series of Aldwych farces that ran nearly continuously at the Aldwych Theatre in London from 1923 to 1933. The story concerns two guests, staying at the Stoatt household for Christmas, who offer shelter to a pretty concert performer left stranded when her employer absconds, leaving his cast unpaid.

The piece opened on 26 May 1931 and ran for 263 performances until 16 January 1932. A film adaptation of the play was made in 1933.

== Background ==
Turkey Time was the ninth in the series of twelve Aldwych farces, and the seventh written by Travers. The first four in the series, It Pays to Advertise, A Cuckoo in the Nest, Rookery Nook and Thark had long runs, averaging more than 400 performances each. The next three were less outstandingly successful, the runs getting shorter with each production: Plunder (1928, 344 performances); A Cup of Kindness (1929, 291 performances); A Night Like This (1930, 267 performances). Turkey Time improved upon the eighth in the series, Marry the Girl (1930), which had managed only 195 performances.

Like its predecessors, the play was directed by Tom Walls, who co-starred with Ralph Lynn, a specialist in playing "silly ass" characters. The regular company of supporting actors included Robertson Hare, who played a figure of put-upon respectability; Mary Brough in eccentric old lady roles; Ethel Coleridge as the severe voice of authority; Winifred Shotter as the sprightly young female lead; and the saturnine Gordon James. This was the last of the Aldwych farces in which Walls appeared on stage. He produced, but did not play in, the last three.

== Original cast ==
- Ernestine Stoatt – Norma Varden
- Louise Wheeler – Doreen Bendix
- Florence – Marjorie Corbett
- Edwin Stoatt – Robertson Hare
- Mrs Gather – Mary Brough
- David Winterton – Ralph Lynn
- Max Wheeler – Tom Walls
- Rose Adair – Winifred Shotter
- Warwick Westbourne – Archibald Batty
- Luke Meate – Gordon James
- Mrs Pike – Ethel Coleridge
- Mr Tuddall – George Barrett

== Synopsis ==
The action takes place at Duddwater, a small seaside town, on the night of Christmas Eve.

=== Act I ===
The dining room at Edwin Stoatt's house

The Stoatt household comprises the meek Edwin and his bossy wife Ernestine, her sister Louise and her fiancé David Winterton, and Max Wheeler, a cousin of Ernestine and Louise, on a holiday from his home in Canada. Ernestine insists that they should all go out carol singing, but Max cannot be found. Mrs Gather, who runs a guest house nearby, comes to complain that one of the men of the household has been misbehaving with one of her guests. Ernestine is so indignant at this slur that she sends Mrs Gather away without learning which of the three men she is accusing.

Everyone except David leaves to go carol singing. Mrs Gather reappears, with Rose in tow. Mrs Gather has decided that as Rose cannot pay her bill, the man whom she saw kissing her can take care of her. The man was Max, but David does not correct Mrs Gather's error. She leaves Rose with David. Rose has been appearing in a show, and was left stranded when the manager absconded without paying his cast. They are interrupted by Warwick Westbourne, an actor who has a romantic interest in Rose and wishes to take her away. Edwin and Louise return, and in the ensuing confusion Westbourne leaves with Rose. Max returns. He and David vow to rescue Rose from Westbourne's clutches. They discover from Mrs Gather that Westbourne has taken Rose to the Bella Vista hotel and go in pursuit.

=== Act II ===
Scene 1 – The "Bella Vista", downstairs

To raise money, Westbourne proposes to sell the theatre company's costumes to Luke Meate, the simple-minded uncle of the landlady of the Bella Vista. Meate gives him the contents of the petty cash box. Mrs Gather's increasingly strident demands for the money owed to her are soon augmented by the demand of Mrs Pike, the owner of the Bella Vista, for the return of her petty cash. The carol singers are heard outside, and Max realises that he can prise enough money from Edwin's collection box to pay both women. Edwin naturally refuses, but Max and David bamboozle him into parting with it.

Scene 2 – The "Bella Vista", upstairs

Mrs Gather, learning that the money is, as she puts it, "ill-got", refuses to accept it. Edwin takes it back. David and Max smuggle Rose out through her bedroom window, and only Edwin is still there when Ernestine and the carol singers burst in.

=== Act III ===
The dining room at Edwin Stoatt's house

David is wondering how to break it to Louise that he has fallen in love with Rose. Louise gets in first, telling him that she has fallen for Max, who reciprocates her love. Florence, the maid, offers Rose the use of the spare bed in her room, and lends her a pair of pyjamas. There is a confused scene in the dark in the small hours when Ernestine brings in Christmas parcels for the household while Edwin discovers and attempts to conceal the clothes that Rose has left there. Finally, Westbourne appears and is knocked out by Max, while David and Rose drive away together in Edwin's motor-car.

== Critical reception ==
Ivor Brown wrote in The Observer:

Mr. Lynn and Mr. Walls have a great evening as the fairly good Samaritans. As the uncommonly good Mr. Stoatt, Mr. Hare is in his usual and irresistible form. I wonder what would happen if they gave him a part in which he was permitted to laugh. Has he forgotten how? That is possible; what is certain is that Turkey Time will generously assist the operation of mirth, as all the Aldwych farces have before it.

The Illustrated London News said of Hare, "that plaintive air and furrowed brow of his rank with the Tower and the Monument as one of the sights of London", and thought the play "very good entertainment, though … some of the Rabelaisian jests will not appeal to all." The Daily Mirror thought the piece "will not rank with the best of the Aldwych farces but … has a lot of odds and ends of fun, plus a dash of charm."

== Revivals and adaptations ==
The play was revived at the Bristol Old Vic in December 1986, directed by Roger Rees with Robert East, Anthony Pedley and John Rogan in the Lynn, Walls and Hare roles.

In 1933 the play was turned into a film of the same title directed by and starring Walls. It was part of a series of successful 1930s screen versions of the Aldwych farces. Walls, Lynn, Hare, Brough, Varden and Corbett reprised their original stage roles. Ben Travers himself adapted the play for a 1970 BBC television production, starring Richard Briers and Arthur Lowe. The play was broadcast on BBC Radio 4 in an adaptation by Martyn Read in December 1993 with Desmond Barrit and Michael Cochrane in the leading roles.
