= A Night Like This (play) =

Play written by Ben Travers

Walls (l) and Lynn (r) with Louis Bradfield (receiving blow to head) and Gordon James (on floor)

A Night Like This is a farce by Ben Travers, written as one of the series of Aldwych farces staged nearly continuously at the Aldwych Theatre, London, from 1923 to 1933. The farces were directed by Tom Walls, who co-starred in most of them with Ralph Lynn, and a supporting cast of regular Aldwych performers. The play is a spoof of detective plays and thrillers, with the two stars successfully taking on a criminal gang. Eventually, the gang is rounded up, and the jewels taken from the heroine are restored to their proper owner.

The piece opened at the Aldwych Theatre on 18 February 1930 and ran until 15 November, a total of 267 performances.

== Background ==
A Night Like This was the seventh in the series of twelve Aldwych farces, and the sixth written by Travers. The first four in the series, It Pays to Advertise, A Cuckoo in the Nest, Rookery Nook and Thark had long runs, averaging more than 400 performances each. The next two were more modest successes: Plunder (1928) ran for 344 performances, and A Cup of Kindness (1929) for 291.

Like its predecessors, the play was produced and directed by Tom Walls, who co-starred with Ralph Lynn, a specialist in playing "silly ass" characters. The regular company of supporting actors included Robertson Hare, who played a figure of put-upon respectability; Mary Brough in eccentric old lady roles; Ethel Coleridge as the severe voice of authority; Winifred Shotter as the sprightly young female lead; and the saturnine Gordon James.

== Original cast ==
- Knee – Gordon James
- Edgar Pryor – John R Turnbull
- Mrs Decent – Mary Brough
- Cora Mellish – Winifred Shotter
- Aubrey Slot – Kenneth Kove
- Mary Deane – Doreen Bendix
- Mrs Knee – Ethel Coleridge
- PC Michael Marsden – Tom Walls
- Amy – Margot Grahame
- Clifford Tope – Ralph Lynn
- Miles Tuckett – Robertson Hare
- Craggy – Louis Bradfield
- Snake Lloyd – Archibald Batty
- Cabman – Fred Morgan
- Mrs Tuckett – Norma Varden
- Detective Inspector Curtis – Philip Carlton

== Synopsis ==
Edgar Pryor runs a shady gambling club with the aid of various henchmen, including Knee, Craggy and Lloyd. Cora Mellish has got into his clutches, and to pay her debts he has taken a valuable necklace from her that she does not own. Her boyfriend, Aubrey – nephew of the real owner of the necklace – is too ineffectual to help, but she gains three champions in the form of Mrs Decent, Clifford Tope and Police Constable Michael Marsden.

Marsden is cornered in the gambling den by two of the gang and puts up a strong fight, which he wins with ease when Tope appears through the window armed with a poker and lays out the assailants (see picture above). Marsden and Tope go in pursuit of the rest of the gang. They requisition the only available cab, immobilising the rightful passenger, Miles Tuckett, by separating him from his trousers. Tope and Marsden round up the gang and restore the necklace to its rightful owner, Mrs Tuckett.

== Critical reception ==
The play divided critical opinion. The Times thought that "judged by the standard that the Aldwych farces have set for themselves, A Night Like This is a disappointment. It lacks speed ... above all, it lacks verbal neatness and surprise". In The Manchester Guardian, Ivor Brown thought the production "immensely ingenious" with "business of the happiest order". In The Illustrated London News, J. T. Grein said, "The two comedians have probably never been so amusing as they are in A Night Like This."

== Adaptations ==
The play was adapted for the cinema in 1932, under the same title. Walls directed, and he, Lynn, Hare, Brough, Shotter and Varden reprised their stage roles.
