= Chase the Ace (disambiguation) =

Chase the Ace is a lottery game that originated in Canada.

Chase the Ace may also refer to:

- Chase the Ace (card game), another name for Ranter-Go-Round
- Chase the Ace (play), a 1935 British play by Anthony Kimmins
- "Chase the Ace", an instrumental rock song by AC/DC from Who Made Who
