= Ethel Coleridge =

English actress (1883–1976)

- Photo from 1937 West End programme
- Born: Ethel Coleridge Tucker; 14 January 1883; South Molton, Devonshire, England
- Died: 15 August 1976 (aged 93); London, England
- Occupation: Actress

Ethel Coleridge (14 January 1883 – 15 August 1976) was an English actress, best known for her roles in the original Aldwych farces in the 1920s and 1930s.

== Life and career ==
Coleridge was born Ethel Coleridge Tucker in South Molton, Devonshire, and educated at Bristol University. At the age of 22 she appeared onstage for the first time as a member of the chorus in Carmen. Over the next fifteen years she acted in a wide range of touring companies, and finally made her West End debut in a cast led by Gladys Cooper, in a revival of My Lady's Dress by Edward Knoblock; she played several roles in the piece, including Mrs Moss, "a stout, elderly, motherly type". Following this she was cast as Nancy Sibley in a revival of Knoblock and Arnold Bennett's Milestones. Over the next six years she played character roles in plays ranging from earnest drama to farce, and in 1926 she was recruited by Tom Walls for what became virtually a stock company at the Aldwych Theatre, led by Walls, Ralph Lynn and Robertson Hare, performing Aldwych farces.

At the Aldwych between 1926 and 1931, Coleridge played Gertrude in Rookery Nook; Lady Benbow in Thark; Mrs Orlock in Plunder; Kate, the maid in A Cup of Kindness; Mrs Knee in A Night Like This; and Mona Flower in Turkey Time. Established as a character actress, Coleridge continued to be cast in West End productions. Among her best-known roles was the bullying Clara Soppitt in J. B. Priestley's comedy, When We Are Married (1938).

Coleridge continued to act during and after the Second World War, and later appeared on BBC radio and television. She acted in films in the 1930s and 1940s.

== Selected filmography ==
- Rookery Nook (1930)
- Plunder (1931)
- Laburnum Grove (1936)
- Lonely Road (1936)
- Keep Your Seats, Please (1936)
- Feather Your Nest (1937)
- Penny Paradise (1938)
- Second Best Bed (1938)
- When We Are Married (1943)
- Murder in Reverse (1945)
- The Loves of Joanna Godden (1947)
