= Freddie Young =

British cinematographer (1902–1998)

- Born: Frederick A. Young; 9 October 1902; London, England
- Died: 1 December 1998 (aged 96); London, England
- Other name: F. A. Young
- Occupation: Cinematographer
- Years active: 1920–1984
- Children: 3
- Awards: Academy Award for Best Cinematography; 1962 Lawrence of Arabia; 1965 Doctor Zhivago; 1970 Ryan's Daughter

Frederick A. Young OBE, BSC (9 October 1902 – 1 December 1998) was an English cinematographer. Sometimes credited as F. A. Young, his career in motion picture photography spanned more than 130 films across 65 years, between 1919 and 1984. He was best known for the sweeping, lush widescreen colour photography he displayed through his collaborations with director David Lean. He won the Academy Award for Best Cinematography three times for Lawrence of Arabia (1962), Doctor Zhivago (1965) and Ryan's Daughter (1970). All were directed by Lean.

In 1972, he was made a BAFTA Fellow by the British Academy of Film and Television Arts. In 2003, a survey conducted by the International Cinematographers Guild placed Young among the ten most influential cinematographers of all time.

== Life and career ==
Young was born in London in 1902, and raised in the West London suburb of Shepherd's Bush. At the age of 15 in 1917, he began working at the Gaumont-British Picture Corporation, and by 1919, he was the film lab manager. He also moonlighted as a stuntman.

During World War II, Young served as a captain and chief cameraman of the British Army's Kinematograph Unit.

=== Cinematographer ===
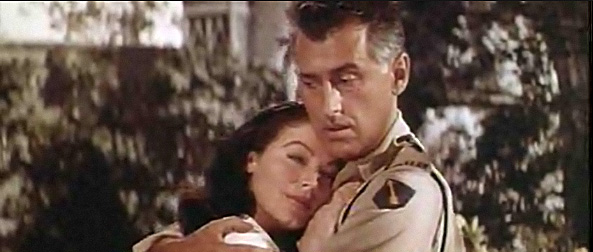
Screenshot of Ava Gardner and Stewart Granger from the trailer for the film Bhowani Junction.

He was also director of photography on more than 130 films, including many other notable productions, such as Goodbye, Mr Chips (1939), 49th Parallel (1941), Lust for Life (1956), The Inn of the Sixth Happiness (1958), Lord Jim (1965), Battle of Britain (1969), Nicholas and Alexandra (1971), and the James Bond film You Only Live Twice (1967). He was also the first British cinematographer to film in CinemaScope.

Young is arguably best known for his creative partnership with director David Lean. He won the Academy Award for Best Cinematography three times, for Lawrence of Arabia (1962), Doctor Zhivago (1965) and Ryan's Daughter (1970), all directed by Lean.

His last film as cinematographer was the Arthurian fantasy film Sword of the Valiant (1984).

=== Other work ===
In 1972, Young co-wrote The Work of the Motion Picture Cameraman with Paul Petzold, published in 1972 (Focal Press, London).

In 1984, at the age of 82, Young directed his only film, Arthur's Hallowed Ground, starring Jimmy Jewel, which was made for television.

== Honours ==
In 1972, Young was awarded the BAFTA Fellowship.

He was awarded the Royal Photographic Society's Centenary Medal and Honorary Fellowship (HonFRPS) in recognition of a sustained, significant contribution to the art of photography in 1996/97.

== Personal life ==
Young married screenwriter Marjorie Gaffney in 1927. They had two children. Following Gaffney's death in 1963, he married film editor Joan Morduch. They had one child.

=== Death ===
Young died in London on 1 December 1998, at the age of 96.

== Selected films ==
- Victory (1928)
- White Cargo (1929)
- A Peep Behind the Scenes (1929)
- Canaries Sometimes Sing (1930)
- Rookery Nook (1930)
- The W Plan (1930)
- Tons of Money (1930)
- On Approval (1930)
- A Warm Corner (1930)
- White Cargo (1930)
- Mischief (1931)
- Carnival (1931)
- Plunder (1931)
- The Chance of a Night Time (1931)
- The Sport of Kings (1931)
- Tilly of Bloomsbury (1931)
- The Speckled Band (1931)
- The Blue Danube (1932)
- The Mayor's Nest (1932)
- Leap Year (1932)
- A Night Like This (1932)
- Good Night, Vienna (1932)
- It's a King (1933)
- Night of the Garter (1933)
- Trouble (1933)
- Up for the Derby (1933)
- Bitter Sweet (1933)
- A Cuckoo in the Nest (1933)
- Girls, Please! (1934)
- The Queen's Affair (1934)
- Nell Gwynn (1934)
- Peg of Old Drury (1935)
- Escape Me Never (1935)
- When Knights Were Bold (1936)
- The Frog (1936)
- Fame (1936)
- Three Maxims (1936)
- Limelight (1936)
- Two's Company (1936)
- Victoria the Great (1937)
- Sunset in Vienna (1937)
- London Melody (1937)
- Millions (1937)
- Sixty Glorious Years (1938)
- Nurse Edith Cavell (1939)
- Goodbye, Mr. Chips (1939)
- Busman's Honeymoon (1940)
- Contraband (1940)
- 49th Parallel (1941)
- The Young Mr. Pitt (1942)
- Caesar and Cleopatra (1945)
- Bedelia (1946)
- So Well Remembered (1947)
- While I Live (1947)
- The Winslow Boy (1948)
- Treasure Island (1950)
- Calling Bulldog Drummond (1951)
- Ivanhoe (1952)
- Mogambo (1953)
- Knights of the Round Table (1953)
- Lust for Life (1956)
- Invitation to the Dance (1956)
- Bhowani Junction (1956)
- Island in the Sun (1957)
- The Barretts of Wimpole Street (1957)
- The Inn of the Sixth Happiness (1958)
- Gideon's Day (1958)
- Indiscreet (1958)
- I Accuse! (1958)
- Solomon and Sheba (1959)
- The Greengage Summer (1961)
- Lawrence of Arabia (1962)
- Lord Jim (1965)
- Rotten to the Core (1965)
- Doctor Zhivago (1965)
- The Deadly Affair (1967)
- You Only Live Twice (1967)
- Battle of Britain (1969)
- Ryan's Daughter (1970)
- Nicholas and Alexandra (1971)
- The Asphyx (1973)
- Luther (1973)
- The Tamarind Seed (1974)
- The Blue Bird (1976)
- Stevie (1978)
- Rough Cut (1980)
- Sword of the Valiant (1984)
