= A Cup of Kindness =

A Cup of Kindness may refer to:

- A Cup of Kindness (play), a 1929 stage farce by Ben Travers
- A Cup of Kindness (film), a 1934 film version of the above, directed by Tom Walls
