= Plunder (1931 film) =

1931 film

- Theatrical release poster
- Directed by: Tom Walls
- Written by: W. P. Lipscomb; Ben Travers (play)
- Produced by: Herbert Wilcox
- Starring: Tom Walls; Ralph Lynn; Winifred Shotter; Robertson Hare
- Cinematography: Freddie Young
- Edited by: W. Duncan Mansfield
- Music by: Leo Kahn
- Production company: British and Dominions
- Distributed by: Woolf and Freedman
- Release date: 7 September 1931
- Running time: 98 minutes
- Country: United Kingdom
- Language: English

Plunder is a 1931 British comedy film directed by and starring Tom Walls. It also features Ralph Lynn, Winifred Shotter and Robertson Hare. It was based on the original stage farce of the same title, and was the second in a series of film adaptations of Aldwych farces by Ben Travers, adapted in this case by W. P. Lipscomb, and was a major critical and commercial success helping to cement Walls's position as one of the leading stars of British cinema.

== Cast ==
- Ralph Lynn as Darcy Tuck
- Tom Walls as Freddie Malone
- Winifred Shotter as Joan Hewlett
- Robertson Hare as Oswald Veal
- Doreen Bendix as Prudence Malone
- Gordon James as Simon Veal
- Ethel Coleridge as Mrs Orlock
- Hubert Waring as Inspector Sibley
- Mary Brough as Mrs Hewlett

== Production ==
It was made at British and Dominion's Elstree Studios. The film's sets were designed by the art director Lawrence P. Williams.

== Reception ==
The Daily Film Renter wrote: "Another of the Tom Walls and Ralph Lynn successes, even richer in humour than its predecessors. Not merely a photographed stage play, but finely treated from kinematographic angles. Great comedy work by Ralph Lynn, who scores even bigger success than in Rookery Nook. Humour never flags, and picture is one constant succession of mirth-provoking situations."

Film Weekly wrote: "It can be said quite justly that Plunder is merely a photographed play, that the story is badly constructed, that it is not too well directed, and that there is too much talk. Yet it will make you laugh; laugh so much that you will forget all these things in appreciation of Ben Travers's bright dialogue and the uproarious incidents. ... This film is not so funny as Rookery Nook, but it is very funny in spite of the fact that its story is the least good of any of the Aldwych farces. All the players are in good form, and you are assured of an evening's amusement if you see this picture."

Kine Weekly wrote: "A neat, efficient picturisation of the successful Aldwych farce, which gains most of its humour from a clever character-study by Ralph Lynn as an amusing and lovable 'silly ass.' The supporting players are all good, and the presentation, although lacking in scope and stagecraft, is efficient. With its attractive title, and following closely upon the co-stars' previous successes this effort should inake a good general booking."
