= Mischief (1931 film) =

1931 film

- Theatrical release poster
- Directed by: Jack Raymond
- Written by: W. P. Lipscomb; Maclean Rogers
- Based on: Mischief by Ben Travers
- Produced by: Herbert Wilcox
- Starring: Ralph Lynn; Winifred Shotter; Jeanne Stuart
- Cinematography: Freddie Young
- Production company: British and Dominions
- Distributed by: Woolf and Freedman
- Release date: 15 December 1931
- Running time: 67 minutes
- Country: United Kingdom
- Language: English

Mischief is a 1931 British comedy film directed by Jack Raymond and starring Ralph Lynn, Winifred Shotter and Jeanne Stuart. It was written by W. P. Lipscomb and Maclean Rogers based on the 1928 farce Mischief by Ben Travers, and shot at the Elstree Studios near London.

== Plot ==
When financier Reginald Bingham leaves on a business trip to Paris, normally devoted wife Eleanor leaves for a cottage with a secret boy friend. The couple are followed by friends of her husband, who attempt to hinder the affair. However, Reginald is also tempted by a fling with an old friend in Paris.

== Cast ==
- Ralph Lynn as Arthur Gordon
- Winifred Shotter as Diana Birkett
- Jeanne Stuart as Eleanor Bingham
- James Carew as Reginald Bingham
- Jack Hobbs as Tom Birkett
- Maud Gill as Louise Piper
- Kenneth Kove as Bertie Pitts
- Louie Emery as Mrs. Easy
- A. Bromley Davenport
- Andreas Malandrinos

== Critical reception ==
Picturegoer wrote: "A real riot of fun, excellently put over, and acted with a wealth of bright 'gags,' plenty of movement, and excellent settings of cabarets and English countryside. ... The whole picture is leavened with a spice of daring, which is as amusing as it is innocuous."

Film Weekly wrote: "Many of the [...] gags are familiar, and the lines are smart rather than clever, but they are put over so slickly, and with such a keen sense of humour, that they can hardly fail to amuse."

TV Guide wrote, "This British farce is a nice combination of slapstick and verbal comedy ...An above-average production for British features of this period."
