= Winifred Shotter =

British actress (1904–1996)

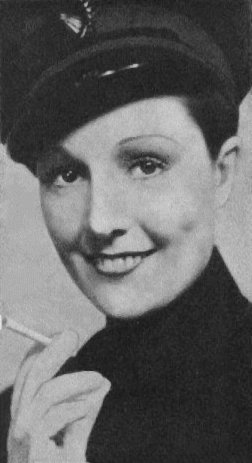
- Born: 5 November 1904; London, England
- Died: 4 April 1996 (aged 91); Redhill, Surrey, England, UK
- Spouses: Brigadier Michael Green (m. 1931; div. 1951) Gilbert Davis (m. 1952)
- Relatives: Constance Shotter (sister)

Winifred Florence Shotter (5 November 1904 – 4 April 1996) was an English actress best known for her appearances in the Aldwych farces of the 1920s and early 1930s.

Initially a singer and dancer in the ensembles of musical comedies, Shotter was spotted by the comedian and producer Leslie Henson. He recommended her to his colleague Tom Walls, who was in search of a leading lady to succeed Yvonne Arnaud in his series of farces at the Aldwych Theatre, London. From 1926 to 1932, Shotter played in eight of the farces, in a regular company headed by Walls and Ralph Lynn. She appeared in several films during the 1930s, including adaptations of four of the Aldwych plays.

After the Aldwych series ended, Shotter appeared in numerous West End shows, worked briefly in Hollywood, and continued to appear in British films. During the Second World War she joined the Entertainments National Service Association (ENSA), performing for troops in Europe and Asia. An example is French Leave, a play by Reginald Berkeley, sub-titled: A Normandy Story, where she appeared with Lawrence O'Madden.

After the war she joined the BBC as an announcer on the relaunched television service. During the 1950s she gradually withdrew from performing and retired to Switzerland with her second husband.

== Life and career ==
=== Early years ===
Shotter was born in London, the eldest of the six children (five of them girls) of Frederick Ernest and Harriet Payne Shotter. The four younger daughters, Constance, Margaret, Eva and Barbara, all followed Winifred into the acting profession. Their only brother, Victor, became a television executive. Her father worked as a tie cutter and later as the manager of a leather factory. Before Winifred there was no stage tradition in her family, but from her days as a schoolgirl at Maidenhead High School she was determined to perform. She made her London debut, at the age of 14, in a travesti role in Soldier Boy at the Apollo Theatre.

Over the next five years she was a member of the ensemble in musical comedies at the Winter Garden Theatre, with small roles in the hit show Sally (1921) and then in The Beauty Prize (1923), both of which starred Leslie Henson. In 1925 she made her New York debut at the Gaiety in the revue By-the-Way.

=== Aldwych farce ===
Shotter in Plunder

When she returned to England, Henson recommended Shotter to his co-producer Tom Walls for the ingenue role of Rhoda Marley in the new Aldwych farce, Rookery Nook. This was the third in the series of farces presented by Walls at the Aldwych Theatre in the 1920s and early 1930s. The heroines in the first two had been played by the hugely popular Yvonne Arnaud, who left the company to play in variety. As her successor, Shotter made an immediate impact: in the words of The Times, "This was 1926, and it was considered delightfully shocking that an actress should make her first appearance in a play in a pair of pyjamas." Her colleague Molly Weir recalled her as "an enchanting 'flapper' who had to be hidden for fear of discovery by prim visiting relatives, and she sent the house into screams of warning appreciative laughter as she raced downstairs from the bedroom and across the stage clad only in exquisitely revealing pink crepe-de-Chine camiknickers."

Shotter remained a member of the Aldwych company for the next six years, playing roles written expressly for her in six farces by Ben Travers and two by others. She played Kitty Stratton in Thark (1927), Joan Hewlett in Plunder (1929), Betty Ramsbotham in A Cup of Kindness (1930), Cora Mellish in A Night Like This (1930), Doris Chataway in Marry the Girl (1930 – by George Arthurs and Arthur Miller), Rose Adair in Turkey Time (1931) and Peggy Croft in Fifty Fifty (1932 – by H. F. Maltby). During this time she married Brigadier Michael Green; the marriage lasted from 1931 until 1951, when they divorced.

Most of the farces were adapted for the cinema. Shotter appeared in films of Rookery Nook (1930), Plunder (1931) and A Night Like This (1932), directed by Walls and featuring the principals of the Aldwych company. She was the only member of the stage cast to feature in the 1934 film of Marry the Girl, directed by Maclean Rogers, with Hugh Wakefield, Sonnie Hale and John Deverell in roles played on stage by Walls, Ralph Lynn and Robertson Hare.

=== 1930s and 40s ===
According to The Times, Shotter was essentially a stage performer, but "like any actress of her generation, she could not afford to ignore Hollywood." She visited America in the mid-1930s and made one film for MGM, Petticoat Fever, a farce featuring Robert Montgomery and Myrna Loy. The film did good business, but Shotter did not greatly care for America, and she returned to England as soon as she could. In addition to adaptations of the Aldwych plays she appeared in more than a dozen other British films through the 1930s, including On Approval with Walls, Hare, Brough and her Aldwych predecessor, Yvonne Arnaud, and Summer Lightning, an adaptation of P G Wodehouse's novel of the same name, co-starring with Lynn.

In the West End, Shotter starred in a series of plays, including Wodehouse's Good Morning, Bill, with Lawrence Grossmith, in a 1934 revival. Chase the Ace (1935) was a departure for her: it was not a comedy but a thriller. The role was poorly written, and she returned to comedy in plays including High Temperature at the Duke of York's Theatre, in which, according to Ivor Brown in The Observer, "Miss Winifred Shotter has mainly to be under-clad and over-worried, which she does very prettily."

During the Second World War Shotter joined ENSA, entertaining the troops in India and Europe. When BBC television transmissions resumed in 1946 she was appointed as one of three announcers, together with Jasmine Bligh and McDonald Hobley.

=== Later years ===
After her divorce from her first husband in 1951, Shotter remarried the following year. Her second husband was the actor Gilbert Davis (1899–1983), whom she had first met in Hollywood. After this she wound her career down. She made her last film in 1955, playing Mrs Swayne in John and Julie. Her later West End appearances included the role of Barbara Fane in a 1954 revival of Ian Hay's 1936 comedy, Housemaster, with Jack Hulbert. The Manchester Guardian observed that Shotter "gives the final touch of pre-war mood to the comedy". Her last stage play was a farce, Caught Napping, at the Piccadilly Theatre in 1959.

Shotter and her husband settled in Switzerland in a house at Montreux, overlooking Lake Geneva. After his death she returned to England, where she died aged 91 at Redhill in Surrey. She had no children from either marriage.

== Filmography ==
- Rookery Nook (1930) – Rhoda Marley
- On Approval (1930) – Helen Hayle
- Plunder (1930) – Joan Hewlett
- The Chance of a Night Time (1931) – Pauline Gay
- Mischief (1931) – Diana Birkett
- A Night Like This (1932) – Cora Mellish
- Jack's the Boy (1932) – Ivy
- The Love Contract (1932) – Antoinette
- Summer Lightning (1933) – Millicent Keeble
- Sorrell and Son (1933) – Molly Pentreath
- Up to the Neck (1933) – April Dawne
- Night of the Garter (1933) – Gwen Darling
- Just My Luck (1933) – Peggy Croft
- Lilies of the Field (1934) – Betty Beverley
- D'Ye Ken John Peel? (1935) – Lucy Merrall
- The Rocks of Valpre (1935) – Christine Wyndham
- Marry the Girl (1935) – Doris Chattaway
- Petticoat Fever (1936) – Clara Wilson
- His Lordship Regrets (1938) – Mary / Mabel
- Candles at Nine (1944) – Brenda Tempest – Cecil's Wife
- The Body Said No! (1950) – TV Announcer
- John and Julie (1955) – Mrs. Swayne

Source: British Film Institute.
