= Queenie Leonard =

British actress (1905–2002)

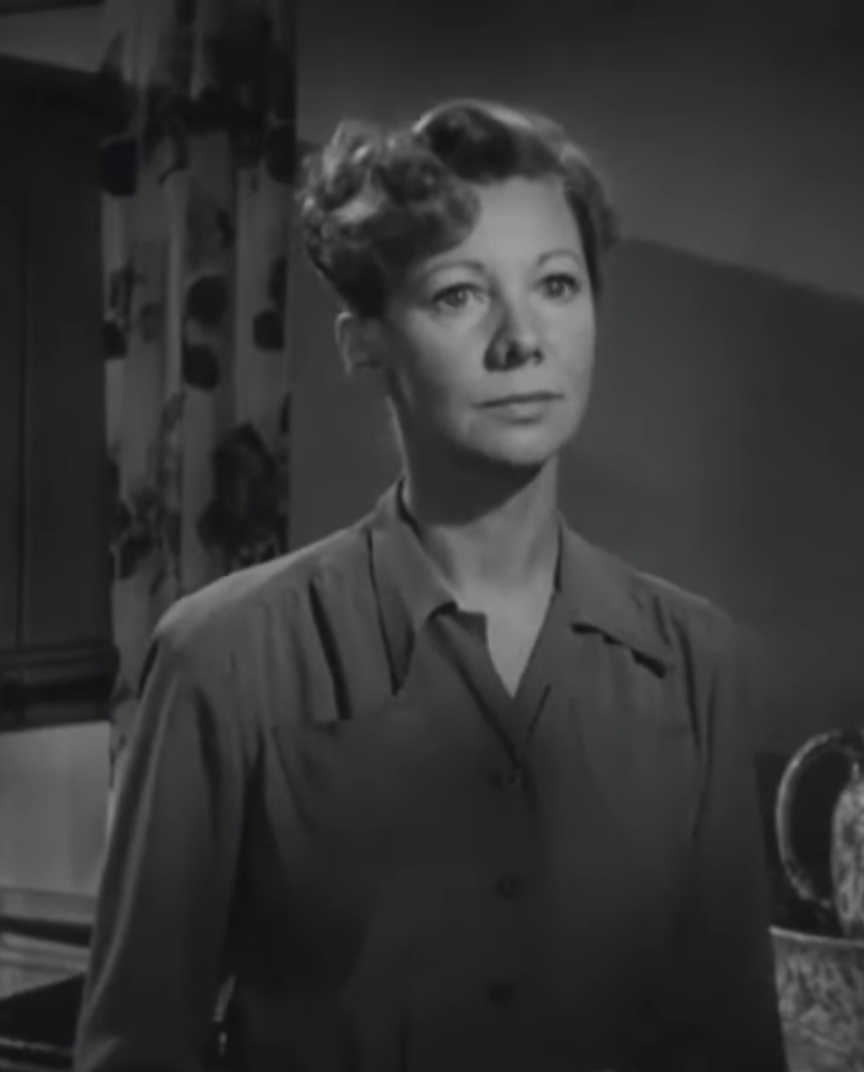
- Leonard in And Then There Were None (1945)
- Born: Pearl Walker; 18 February 1905; Manchester, Lancashire, England
- Died: 17 January 2002 (aged 96); Los Angeles, California, U.S.
- Resting place: Westwood Memorial Park
- Occupation: Actress
- Years active: 1921–1968
- Spouses: Lawrence P. Williams (m. 1936; div. 1947) Tom Conway (m. 1958; div. 1963)

Queenie Leonard (born Pearl Walker; 18 February 1905 – 17 January 2002) was a British actress. She was the last surviving cast member of And Then There Were None (1945) until her death in 2002.

== Biography ==
She was born as Pearl Walker in Manchester, Lancashire, England in 1905 and began performing on stage with her father when she was 14 years old. She debuted on film in 1931. She had already amassed 20 years of stage and screen experience when, in 1941, she made the first of more than 30 Hollywood films. She also appeared in cabaret in Britain and in the United States, starred in a one-woman show, acted in television sitcoms, and provided voices for Disney animated films. She retired in 1968. Her last appearance was in 20th Century Fox's Star!.

Leonard was married to film designer Lawrence P. Williams from 1936 to 1947, and to actor Tom Conway from 1958 to 1963. Both unions were childless and ended in divorce.

Leonard was legally blind for part of her life.

On 17 January 2002, Leonard died of natural causes at her apartment in West Los Angeles, at age 96. She is buried in the Westwood Village Memorial Park Cemetery in Los Angeles in the burial plot called the "Garden of Roses".

== Complete filmography ==
Year	Title	Roles	Notes
1931	Who Killed Doc Robin?	Amy Anderson	Short
1934	Romance in Rhythm	Skye Gunderson	
1936	Skylarks	Maggie Hicks	
1937	Moonlight Sonata	Margit	
1937	The Show Goes On	Lilith Henderson	
1937	Limelight	Queenie	
1937	Dick Whittington and His Cat	Dick Whittington	TV movie
1937	Millions	Lilian	
1938	Have You Brought Your Music?	Mishina	TV movie
1938	They're Off!	Diana Turriot	TV movie
1938	On the Spot	Minn Lee	TV movie
1938	Kate Plus Ten	Ellen Pamplemousse	
1938	King of the Congo	Ruth	TV movie
1938	Pest Pilot	Lady April	TV movie
1939	More Fun and Games!	Tuesday X	TV movie
1941	Ladies in Retirement	Sister Agatha	
1941	Confirm or Deny	Daisy, Consolidated Press Switchboard Operator	
1942	This Above All	Violet Worthing	
1942	Eagle Squadron	Bridget – Lancashire blonde	
1943	Forever and a Day	Maid	as Oueenie Leonard
1943	Thumbs Up	Janie Brooke	
1944	The Lodger	Daisy – the Maid	
1944	The Uninvited	Mrs. Taylor	Uncredited
1944	Our Hearts Were Young and Gay	Maid	Uncredited
1945	Tonight and Every Night	Cockney Woman	Uncredited
1945	Molly and Me	Lily	
1945	And Then There Were None	Mrs. Rogers	
1945	My Name Is Julia Ross	Alice	Uncredited
1946	Cluny Brown	Weller	Uncredited
1946	The Locket	Woman Singer	
1947	Life With Father	Maggie	
1947	The Lone Wolf in London	Lily	
1948	The Black Arrow	Serving Woman	Uncredited
1948	Homecoming	Nurse	Uncredited
1948	Hills of Home	Mrs. MacFadyen	Uncredited
1949	My Own True Love	Minor Role	Uncredited
1949	The Secret of St. Ives	Maid	Uncredited
1950	A Life of Her Own	Hotel Matron	Uncredited
1951	Lorna Doone	Gweeny	Uncredited
1951	Kind Lady	Bit Role	Uncredited
1951	Alice in Wonderland	A Bird in a Tree/Snooty Flower	Voice
1951	Thunder on the Hill	Mrs. Smithson	
1951	Thunder in the East	Miss Huggins	Uncredited
1952	The Narrow Margin	Mrs. Troll	
1952	Les Misérables	Valjean's Maid	Uncredited
1952	Million Dollar Mermaid	Mrs. Graves, John's Mother	Uncredited
1953	Latin Lovers	Rufina	Scenes cut
1954	Ring of Fear	Tillie / Fortune-Teller	Uncredited
1955	The King's Thief	Apothecary's Wife	
1956	Gaby	Canteen Worker	Uncredited
1956	23 Paces to Baker Street	Miss Elsie Schuyler	Uncredited
1956	D-Day the Sixth of June	Corporal on Train	Uncredited
1960	All the Fine Young Cannibals	Nurse	
1961	One Hundred and One Dalmatians	Princess	Voice
1962	The Notorious Landlady	Woman	Uncredited
1962	Hatari!	Nurse	Scenes cut
1963	The Prize	Miss Fawley	Uncredited
1964	What a Way to Go!	Lady Kensington	Uncredited
1964	Mary Poppins	Depositor	Uncredited
1964	My Fair Lady	Cockney Bystander	Uncredited
1967	Doctor Dolittle	Courtroom Spectator	Uncredited
1968	Star!	Grand Dam	Uncredited
