= Old Home =

Old Home can refer to:

- Old Home Bread, a brand owned by Bimbo Bakeries USA
- Old Home Week, a civic event
- Retirement home
