= Tons of Money (1930 film) =

1930 film

- Directed by: Tom Walls
- Written by: Will Evans (play); Arthur Valentine (play); Ralph Lynn; Herbert Wilcox
- Produced by: Herbert Wilcox
- Starring: Ralph Lynn; Yvonne Arnaud; Mary Brough; Robertson Hare
- Cinematography: Freddie Young; Hal Young
- Edited by: Maclean Rogers
- Production company: British and Dominions
- Distributed by: Woolf and Freedman
- Release date: 31 December 1930
- Running time: 97 minutes
- Country: United Kingdom
- Language: English

Tons of Money is a 1930 British comedy film directed by Tom Walls and starring Ralph Lynn, Yvonne Arnaud, Mary Brough, Robertson Hare and Gordon James, the same artistes responsible for the Aldwych farces. It was a remake of the 1924 film Tons of Money which had been based on the 1922 play Tons of Money by Will Evans and Arthur Valentine. It was made at British and Dominion's Elstree Studios with sets designed by the art director Lawrence P. Williams.

== Premise ==
A debt-ridden inventor has to pretend to be his cousin to avoid his creditors.

== Cast ==
- Ralph Lynn as Aubrey Allington
- Yvonne Arnaud as Louise Allington
- Mary Brough as Benita Mullet
- Robertson Hare as Chesterman
- Gordon James as George Maitland
- Madge Saunders as Jane Everard
- Philip Hewland as Henry
- Willie Warde as Giles
- John Turnbull as Sprules
- Peggy Douglas as Simpson - the maid

== Bibliography ==
- Low, Rachael. Filmmaking in 1930s Britain. George Allen & Unwin, 1985.
- Wood, Linda. British Films, 1927-1939. British Film Institute, 1986.
