= On Approval (1930 film) =

1930 film

- Directed by: Tom Walls
- Written by: W. P. Lipscomb; Frederick Lonsdale (play)
- Produced by: Herbert Wilcox
- Starring: Tom Walls; Yvonne Arnaud; Winifred Shotter; Robertson Hare
- Cinematography: Freddie Young
- Edited by: Duncan Mansfield
- Production company: British and Dominions
- Distributed by: Woolf and Freedman
- Release date: 26 August 1930
- Running time: 100 minutes
- Country: United Kingdom
- Language: English
- Budget: $150,000
- Box office: $500,000

On Approval is a 1930 British comedy film directed by and starring Tom Walls and also featuring Yvonne Arnaud, Winifred Shotter and Robertson Hare, the same artistes responsible for the Aldwych farces. It was based on the play On Approval by Frederick Lonsdale, as was the 1944 film On Approval.

It was made at British and Dominion's Elstree Studios with sets designed by Lawrence P. Williams.

The 1932 book "The Face of London" by Harold Clunn Pub. Simpkin Marshall, features, opposite page 224, a picture, probably taken in Aug. or Sept. 1930, of the New Victoria Picture Theatre, Vauxhall Bridge Road. Displayed in large letters is ON APPROVAL the film being presented by the cinema at that time.

== Cast ==
- Tom Walls as Duke of Bristol
- Yvonne Arnaud as Maria Wislak
- Winifred Shotter as Helen Hayle
- Edmund Breon as Richard Wemys
- Mary Brough as Emerald
- Robertson Hare as Hedworth
