= A Night Like This (1932 film) =

1932 film

- Directed by: Tom Walls
- Written by: Ben Travers; W. P. Lipscomb; Tom Walls
- Based on: A Night Like This by Ben Travers
- Produced by: Herbert Wilcox
- Starring: Tom Walls; Ralph Lynn; Winifred Shotter; Robertson Hare
- Cinematography: Freddie Young
- Edited by: Maclean Rogers
- Music by: Roy Fox; Lew Stone
- Production company: British and Dominions
- Distributed by: Woolf and Freedman
- Release date: 17 March 1932
- Running time: 72 minutes
- Country: United Kingdom
- Language: English

A Night Like This is a 1932 comedy film directed by Tom Walls and starring Walls, Ralph Lynn and Winifred Shotter. Ben Travers wrote the screenplay, adapting his own play, the original 1930 Aldwych farce of the same title.

The film was made at British and Dominion's Elstree Studios with sets designed by the art director Lawrence P. Williams.

== Plot ==
Police Constable Mahoney, with the help of the affable Clifford Tope, outwits a criminal gang that operates from a gambling club. Mahoney and Tope restore a stolen necklace to its owner.

== Cast ==
- Ralph Lynn as Clifford Tope*
- Tom Walls as PC Michael Mahoney*
- Winifred Shotter as Cora Mellish*
- Mary Brough as Mrs Decent*
- Robertson Hare as Miles Tuckett*
- Claude Hulbert as Aubrey Slott
- C. V. France as Micky the Mailer
- Joan Brierley as Molly Dean
- Boris Ranevsky as Koski
- Reginald Purdell as Waiter
- Norma Varden as Mrs Tuckett*
- Kay Hammond as Mimi, cocktail shaker
- Hal Gordon as Taxi driver
- Roy Fox's Band as Night club band
- Al Bowlly as Singer
- Lew Stone as Pianist

Source: British Film Institute

Cast members marked * were the creators of the roles in the original stage production; Michael Mahoney was called Michael Marsden in the stage play.
