= Mary Brough =

English actress (1863–1934)

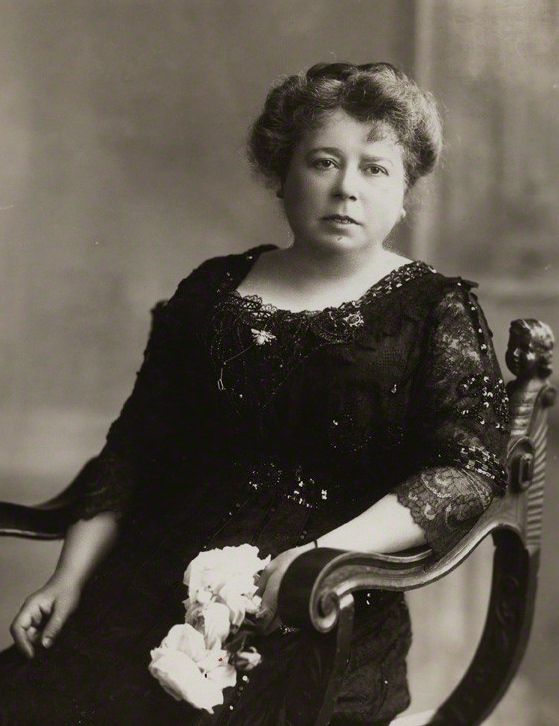
- Brough in the 1910s
- Born: Mary Bessie Brough; 14 April 1863; London, England
- Died: 30 September 1934 (aged 71); Stockwell, South London, England
- Resting place: West Norwood Cemetery
- Occupation: Actress
- Years active: 1881–1934
- Parent: Lionel Brough
- Relatives: Fanny Brough (cousin)

Mary Bessie Brough (16 April 1863 – 30 September 1934) was an English actress in theatre, silent films and early talkies, including eleven of the twelve Aldwych farces of the 1920s and early 1930s.

The daughter of a well-known actor, Lionel Brough, with a long theatrical family tradition, she became a professional actress in December 1881. Although she was in regular demand in character parts she did not become well known to theatre-goers until she was nearly sixty. In 1922 she was cast in a small part in a farce, Tons of Money, which was followed by a ten-year series of new farces at the Aldwych Theatre for which the actor-manager Tom Walls assembled a regular company of players, including Brough. The playwright Ben Travers wrote parts expressly to suit her persona; she recorded several of them in films of the farces.

== Life and career ==
Brough was born in London, the eldest daughter of the actor Lionel Brough and his wife Margaret, née Simpson. The family's stage traditions extended well beyond her father. The Times said of Mary Brough, "she was a granddaughter of one dramatist, the niece of two others and the first cousin of several men and women of the theatre, of whom the best remembered is Miss Fanny Brough."

Brough made her stage debut on the same day and in the same production as Lillie Langtry: She Stoops to Conquer at the Theatre Royal, Haymarket. Lionel Brough played Tony Lumpkin; his daughter played the unnamed maid. She worked for leading managements, including those of J. L. Toole, Herbert Beerbohm Tree, Charles Frohman and Cyril Maude. Her roles varied from the classics to new light comedies, and the popular melodramas at Drury Lane. Her only Shakespearean part was Mistress Quickly in Henry IV, Part 1 (1914); she played in two Dickens dramatisations, as Clara Peggoty in David Copperfield and Mrs Bedwin in Oliver Twist (both 1915).

The Times singled out for mention her performances in Arnold Bennett's What the Public Wants (1909), F. Anstey's The Brass Bottle (1909), Get-Rich-Quick Wallingford (1913), Mr. Wu (1916), Lord and Lady Algy (1917), London Pride (1917), and The Young Person in Pink (1920). But The Manchester Guardian commented that popular fame came to her when nearly sixty, cast in the small role of Benita Mullet alongside Ralph Lynn, Tom Walls and Robertson Hare in Tons of Money in 1922. She made a great success in the part and became a key member of the team that Walls assembled for the Aldwych farces that ran nearly continuously from 1923 to 1933. In these, she played Mrs Spoker in A Cuckoo in the Nest (1925), Mrs Leverett in Rookery Nook (1926), Mrs Frush in Thark (1927), Mrs Hewlett in Plunder (1928), Mrs Tutt in A Cup of Kindness (1929), Mrs Decent in A Night Like This (1930), Mrs Chattaway in Marry the Girl (1931), Mrs Gather in Turkey Time (1931), Mrs Bugle in Dirty Work (1932), Madame Heffer in Fifty-Fifty (1932), and Mrs Rusby in A Bit of a Test (1933).

Brough appeared in more than 60 films, both silent and talkies, where she was best known for her comic characterisations, playing fearsome women in farces; some were Cockney; some were aristocratic; others were parvenu; some were sympathetic and some were monstrous, but all were formidable. Films included her debut Beauty and the Barge (1914), also: A Sister to Assist 'Er (1922 silent version), His Grace Gives Notice (1924), Rookery Nook (1930) and Tons of Money (1930).

At Easter 1934, Brough was playing in a new farce, Indoor Fireworks at the Aldwych, when she was taken ill in her dressing room. She was nursed at her home in Stockwell south London, where she died at the age of 71. She was interred in the family vault at West Norwood Cemetery with her father, mother and grandmother. A memorial service was held at St Martin-in-the-Fields on 4 October.

== Selected filmography ==
- The Brass Bottle (1914)
- Beauty and the Barge (1914)
- Lawyer Quince (1914)
- Masks and Faces (1917)
- London Pride (1920)
- The Law Divine (1920)
- Judge Not (1920)
- The Fordington Twins (1920)
- Enchantment (1920)
- John Forrest Finds Himself (1920)
- The Amazing Quest of Mr. Ernest Bliss (1920)
- Demos (1921)
- The Golden Dawn (1921)
- The Diamond Necklace (1921)
- The Bachelor's Club (1921)
- The Night Hawk (1921)
- The Tinted Venus (1921)
- Tit for Tat (1921)
- The Will (1921)
- The Adventures of Mr. Pickwick (1921)
- All Sorts and Conditions of Men (1921)
- The Old Wives' Tale (1921)
- Squibs Wins the Calcutta Sweep (1922)
- A Sister to Assist 'Er (1922)
- The School for Scandal (1923)
- Lights of London (1923)
- Married Love (1923)
- Lily of the Alley (1924)
- Miriam Rozella (1924)
- Not for Sale (1924)
- The Alley of Golden Hearts (1924)
- His Grace Gives Notice (1924)
- The Only Way (1925)
- Safety First (1926)
- Tons of Money (1926)
- A Sister to Assist 'Er (1927)
- Sailors Don't Care (1928)
- Dawn (1928)
- The Physician (1928)
- The Passing of Mr. Quin (1929)
- Master and Man (1929)
- Wait and See (1929)
- The Broken Melody (1929)
- A Sister to Assist 'Er (1930)
- Tons of Money (1930)
- Rookery Nook (1930)
- On Approval (1930)
- Plunder (1931)
- A Night Like This (1932)
- Thark (1932)
- A Cuckoo in the Nest (1933)
- Up to the Neck (1933)
- Turkey Time (1933)
