= W. P. Lipscomb =

British screenwriter (1887–1958)

- Born: 1 October 1887; Merton, Surrey, United Kingdom
- Died: 25 July 1958 (aged 70); Kensington, London, United Kingdom
- Occupation: Screenwriter
- Years active: 1928–1959 (film)

William Percy Lipscomb (born 1887 in Merton, Surrey, England, died 25 July 1958) was a British-born Hollywood playwright, screenwriter, producer and director. He died in London in 1958, aged 71.

== Career ==
Lipscomb edited a brewery magazine and wrote sketches for gramophone companies in his spare time. His first screenwriting credit was Balaclava (1928). He wrote a short The Safe.

He worked regularly for Herbert Wilcox, adapting stage productions such as Splinters (1929). His adaptation of Rookery Nook (1930) by Ben Travers was so successful he adapted other works by Travers: A Night Like This (1931), Plunder (1931), The Chance of a Night Time (1931), and Mischief (1931).

He adapted On Approval (1930) and Canaries Sometimes Sing (1932) by Frederick Lonsdale.

He also wrote some Jack Raymond films including French Leave (1930), The Great Game (1930), Tilly of Bloomsbury (1931), and The Speckled Band (1931). The latter was a Sherlock Holmes story as was The Sign of Four (1932). He was at a story conference for a project Dying to Live with a writer who died.

Lipscomb wrote thrillers for the gramophone such as His Master's Voice.

Lipscomb did vehicles for musical stars including Jack Hulbert (Jack's the Boy (1932)); Jessie Matthews (There Goes the Bride (1932) and The Man from Toronto (1932)).

In 1931 he reportedly wrote an original for Jack Buchanan to be directed by Basil Dean, The Fun Men Have but it was not made. He did a radio play The Verdict (1933).

Lipscomb was one of several writers in The Good Companions (1933) starring Matthews, produced by Michael Balcon and directed by Victor Saville. A 1933 article in Variety called him "possibly the best" screenwriter "in the country".

Lipscomb worked on Channel Crossing (1933); Loyalties (1933) from the play by John Galsworthy; I Was a Spy (1933); and The King of Paris (1934) for Raymond.

Lipscomb's success as writer enabled him to turn director as well as writer for Colonel Blood (1934). It remains his only directorial credit.

As a writer he did The Camels Are Coming (1934) with Hulbert; Soldiers of the King (1934); The King of Paris (1934); and Me and Marlborough (1935) with Cicely Courtneidge for Saville.

=== Hollywood ===
Lipscomb wrote a play with R.J. Minney, Clive of India (1934). It was a hit and 20th Century Fox bought the film rights. Lipscomb did the adaptation in Hollywood and the 1935 film was a success. (Lipscomb would later adapt the play for British TV in 1938.) He would stay in Hollywood for four years.

Lipscomb found himself in demand to adapt historical novels: Cardinal Richelieu (1935), Les Misérables (1935), A Tale of Two Cities (1935), A Message to Garcia (1936), Under Two Flags (1936), and The Garden of Allah (1936). Universal hired him to do a version of Phantom of the Opera that was never used.

In England, Troubled Waters (1936) based on his story was produced.

He returned to England to write a play about Samuel Pepys, Ninety Sails (1937). It was adapted for TV as Thank You, Mr. Pepys (1938).

He worked on the adaptation of Pygmalion (1938).

In Hollywood Lipscomb was reportedly writing an Australian bushranging story Captain Midnight. This became Captain Fury (1939) but Lipscomb is not credited.

He worked on the scripts for The Sun Never Sets (1939), a pro British empire film. He also did Moon Over Burma (1940), Pacific Blackout (1941), and Forever and a Day (1943).

=== Producer ===
Lipscomb returned to England. He worked as producer and writer on Beware of Pity (1946) and The Mark of Cain (1947).

He wrote a play The Man with the Cloak Full of Holes (1946) and The Lady Maria (1947). From 1947-51 he was a scenario editor at Ealing Studios.

=== Australia ===
Lipscomb co-wrote a play about an Australian Pommy before ever visiting that country. Ealing sent Lipscomb to Australia to write Bitter Springs (1950) and a version of the bushranging novel Robbery Under Arms.

Ealing sent him to Africa to write Where No Vultures Fly (1951), which became a big hit. He then adapted a comic novel His Excellency (1952).

Lipscomb produced and wrote Make Me an Offer (1955). He returned to Hollywood briefly where was one of several writers on Seven Wonders of the World (1956). He wrote some BBC plays.

Lipscomb then worked on some other projects with Australian connections: A Town Like Alice (1956), from a novel by Neville Shute; Robbery Under Arms (1957) from a novel by Thomas Alexander Browne; Dust in the Sun (1958) from the novel by Jon Cleary, produced and directed by Lee Robinson.

He helped write the Ealing war film Dunkirk (1958) and did an Australian-French film The Restless and the Damned (1959), co produced by Robinson.

== Personal life ==
Lipscomb was married in 1937. He died in London in 1958.

== Filmography ==
=== As screenwriter ===
- Balaclava (1928)
- Splinters (1929)
- French Leave (1930)
- Rookery Nook (1930)
- On Approval (1930)
- The Great Game (1930)
- Canaries Sometimes Sing (1930)
- A Night Like This (1931)
- Plunder (1931)
- Tilly of Bloomsbury (1931)
- The Speckled Band (1931)
- The Chance of a Night Time (1931)
- Mischief (1931)
- The Safe (1932)
- The Sign of Four (1932)
- Jack's the Boy (1932)
- There Goes the Bride (1932)
- Skipper of the Osprey (1933)
- The Man from Toronto (1933)
- Channel Crossing (1933)
- Loyalties (1933)
- I Was a Spy (1933)
- The King of Paris (1934)
- Colonel Blood (1934)
- The Camels Are Coming (1934)
- Soldiers of the King (1934)
- Me and Marlborough (1935)
- Clive of India (1935)
- Cardinal Richelieu (1935)
- Les Misérables (1935)
- A Tale of Two Cities (1935)
- A Message to Garcia (1936)
- Under Two Flags (1936)
- The Garden of Allah (1936)
- Clive of India (TV) (1938)
- The Sun Never Sets (1939)
- Moon Over Burma (1940)
- Pacific Blackout (1941)
- Forever and a Day (1943)
- Beware of Pity (1946)
- The Mark of Cain (1947)
- Bitter Springs (1950)
- Where No Vultures Fly (1951)
- His Excellency (1952)
- Make Me an Offer (1955)
- Seven Wonders of the World (1956)
- A Town Like Alice (1956)
- Robbery Under Arms (1957)
- Dust in the Sun (1958)
- Dunkirk (1958)
- Payment on Demand (L'Ambitieuse) (1959)

=== As producer ===
- Beware of Pity (1946)
- The Mark of Cain (1947)

=== As director ===
- Colonel Blood (1934)

=== As playwright ===
- Clive of India (1934)
- Thank You, Mr. Pepys! (1937)
- The Man with the Cloak Full of Holes
- Pommy (1954)
