= Rookery Nook (1953 TV drama) =

1953 British television film

Rookery Nook was a 1953 British live television production of the comedy play by Ben Travers broadcast on 23 May 1953. Featuring in this version were Peter Cushing, David Stoll, and Lally Bowers.

It was based on Travers' play Rookery Nook, one of the Aldwych Farces. It is believed not to have been telerecorded as it was transmitted and is therefore lost.

== Cast ==
- Joy Adamson ... Poppy Dickie
- Beryl Bainbridge ... Rhoda Marley
- Lally Bowers ... Gertrude Twine
- Edgar K. Bruce ... Putz
- Peter Cushing ... Clive Popkiss
- Ian Fleming ... Admiral Juddy
- David Kossoff ... Harold Twine
- Tonie MacMillan ... Mrs. Leverett
- Audrey O'Flynn ... Mrs. Possett
- Anne Padwick ... Clara Popkiss
- David Stoll ... Gerald Popkiss
