= Night of the Garter =

1933 film

- British lobby card
- Directed by: Jack Raymond
- Written by: Marjorie Gaffney; Austin Melford
- Based on: Getting Gertie's Garter by: Wilson Collison; Avery Hopwood
- Produced by: Herbert Wilcox
- Starring: Sydney Howard; Winifred Shotter; Elsie Randolph
- Cinematography: Freddie Young
- Music by: Lew Stone
- Production company: British and Dominions
- Distributed by: United Artists
- Release date: 18 September 1933
- Running time: 86 minutes
- Country: United Kingdom
- Language: English

Night of the Garter is a 1933 British comedy film directed by Jack Raymond and starring Sydney Howard, Winifred Shotter and Elsie Randolph. It was written by Marjorie Gaffney and Austin Melford based on the play Getting Gertie's Garter by Avery Hopwood and Wilson Collison, and was made at British and Dominion's Elstree Studios by the producer Herbert Wilcox for release by United Artists. The film's sets were designed by the art director Andrew Mazzei.

== Preservation status ==
The British Film Institute National Archive holds a collection of ephemera and stills but no film or video materials.

== Premise ==
A bridegroom searches for his bride's missing jewelled garter.

== Cast ==
- Sydney Howard as Bodger
- Winifred Shotter as Gwen Darling
- Elsie Randolph as Jenny Warwick
- Connie Ediss as Fish
- Austin Melford as Bunny Phipps
- Harold French as Teddy Darling
- Jack Melford as Kenneth Warwick
- Marjorie Brooks as Barbara Phipps
- Arthur Chesney as vicar

== Reception ==
Kine Weekly wrote: "Farcical comedy, a straightforward adaptation of the successful play, which takes a little time to get going, but once it does, careers at a lively pace and scores a full complement of laughs. The devices employed to build up humour are not original, but tireless team work, coupled with the sly, inimitable humour of Sydney Howard, gives them pep and piquancy, and allows them to register with fulsome effect."

The Daily Film Renter wrote: "Richly amusing farce, with Sydney Howard at his best. ... Talented cast gets most out of every situation. Sure-fire money-maker for any audience. Judging by the shouts of laughter that echoed throughout the theatre during the whole screening of Night of the Garter, there is no shadow of doubt that its success will be automatic. Time and again the antics of Sydney Howard so convulsed a big audience that the dialogue was often drowned in consequence, and it was generally regarded as Howard's best work on the screen to date. "
