= A Cup of Kindness (play) =

Play written by Ben Travers

Ralph Lynn, Winifred Shotter and Tom Walls in 1929 production

A Cup of Kindness is a farce by the English playwright Ben Travers. It was first given at the Aldwych Theatre, London, the sixth in the series of twelve Aldwych farces presented by the actor-manager Tom Walls at the theatre between 1923 and 1933. Several of the actors formed a regular core cast for the Aldwych farces. The play depicts the feud between two suburban families.

The piece opened on 24 May 1929 and ran for 291 performances. Travers made a film adaptation, which Walls directed in 1934, with some of the leading members of the stage cast reprising their roles.

== Background ==
The actor-manager Tom Walls produced the series of Aldwych farces, nearly all written by Ben Travers, starring Walls and his co-star Ralph Lynn, who specialised in playing "silly ass" characters. Walls assembled a regular company of actors to fill the supporting roles, including Robertson Hare, who played a figure of put-upon respectability; Mary Brough in eccentric old lady roles; Ethel Coleridge as the severe voice of authority; Winifred Shotter as the sprightly young female lead; and the saturnine Gordon James.

Walls and his team had already enjoyed five substantial hits at the Aldwych, with It Pays to Advertise (1923), which had run for 598 performances; A Cuckoo in the Nest (1925, 376 performances); Rookery Nook (1926, 409 performances); Thark (1927, 401 performances); and Plunder (1928, 344 performances). All except the first of them were written by Ben Travers. The earlier Travers farces had depicted upper or upper-middle class characters and country houses. For A Cup of Kindness, he turned his attention to middle class suburban life and petty snobbery. Each of the regular members of the team was generally given the same sort of part in the various new plays, but in this one Coleridge played a maid – a grumbling, kindly factotum – rather than her usual bossy authority-figures.

== Original cast ==
- Jim Finch – Archibald Batty
- Kate – Ethel Coleridge
- Ernest Ramsbotham – Robertson Hare
- Charlie Tutt – Ralph Lynn
- Mrs Ramsbotham – Marie Wright
- Nicholas Ramsbotham – Gordon James
- Betty Ramsbotham – Winifred Shotter
- Mrs Tutt – Mary Brough
- Fred Tutt – Tom Walls
- Tilly Winn – Doreen Bendix
- Stanley Tutt – Kenneth Kove
- Mr Niblett – Ivan Leslie
- Mr Chivers – Philip Carlton

== Synopsis ==
=== Act I ===
Ernest Ramsbotham's drawing room, London

Jim Finch, an engaging but dubious businessman, is trying to sell shares to Charlie Tutt, and when he refuses them, to Charlie's prospective father-in-law, Ernest Ramsbotham. Both Charlie and Ernest have bought shares from Finch before, and are not going to do so again, the first lot having lost all their supposed value.

Charlie is in love with Ernest's daughter Betty, but their marriage is opposed by Ernest and by Charlie's father, Fred, who detests Ernest as much as Ernest detests him. The Tutts regard the Ramsbothams as their social inferiors, and the Rambothams are resentful of what they see as the Tutts' show of superiority. This precarious social balance is threatened by the Tutts' secret: Mrs Tutt was once a barmaid. The Ramsbothams know this perfectly well, and any allusion to it by them causes seismic eruptions from Mrs Tutt. The Ramsbothams have their own family embarrassment: Ernest's unhinged uncle Nicholas who lives in their attic, looked after by a flighty nurse, Tilly. Betty and Charlie separately wheedle their fathers; Ernest is won over, and Fred seems on the point of giving in when his younger son, Stanley, arrives. He confesses that he has been sent down from Oxford; the authorities found a young woman in the bathroom of his rooms. This puts Fred in such a temper that he withdraws his tentative approval to the marriage of Charlie and Betty. He warns Charlie that if they marry he will cut off Charlie's allowance. Charlie defiantly replies that he will earn his own living, working with Jim Finch.

=== Act II ===
The same, three months later

It is Charlie and Betty's wedding day. The two families, still bickering, are marshalled with considerable difficulty to pose for the group wedding photographs. The proceedings are interrupted by the police. The bridegroom is arrested for fraud. In fact, Charlie, well-meaning but naïve, has no idea what goes on at Jim Finch's firm, where he is a junior partner. Jim has vanished and the police are looking for him. Before Charlie is driven away to Bow Street police station, a furious row breaks out between the elder Rambothams and Tutts. Betty feels that Charlie is siding with his father; she rejects him. He vows that she will come back to him when he is a free man again. Police Inspector Chivers takes him away.

=== Act III ===
The same, five days later, evening

Stanley persuades Betty that she has been too hasty. She agrees that she will come back to Charlie and they leave. Fred, who has been on a spree with nurse Tilly and is mellowed by drink, makes his peace with Ernest. The latter has been due to give evidence against Jim and Charlie's firm, with regard to the shares he bought from Jim. They agree – Ernest with some reluctance – that if he sells the shares at a profit to Fred he can conscientiously give evidence in favour of Jim and his firm. Fred, wincing at the cost, buys them.

Betty returns. She and Charlie are reconciled. Their tête-à-tête is interrupted by a telephone call. The police have found Jim who has revealed everything. Charlie observes that, though innocent, he can hardly plead not guilty if Jim is going to enter a plea of guilty, and so a prison sentence seems inevitable. Jim arrives in person. Charlie has misinterpreted the telephone call: in revealing everything, Jim has demonstrated to the police that there was never any fraud, and that the original shares are now worth vastly more than Ernest or Charlie paid him for them. Ernest is furious at having just parted with what were supposed to be worthless shares, and another row begins between him and Fred. Their wives join in. The commotion is interrupted by the sound of Big Ben striking midnight on the radio, and, à la New Year's Eve, Charlie starts singing Auld Lang Syne; one by one, realising the futility of their feud, the family members join in until they have all linked hands and are singing together.

== Reception ==
The Times commented, "It would be quite beside the point to complain that one Aldwych farce is like any other. An orange is no less succulent for resembling the orange of yesterday." At its best, in the paper's view, "this piece is funny in much the same wildly extravagant way that Mr. Wodehouse's stories are funny. The truth is that Mr. Lynn can be more like a Wodehouse figure of fun than anything Mr. Wodehouse has ever succeeded in creating for the theatre". The Daily Mirror said that there was a laugh in every line of the piece. In The Observer, St John Ervine thought that the cast and the author showed signs of fatigue, but he allowed that the piece was "immensely entertaining in parts". He singled out Robertson Hare for particular praise. Ivor Brown in The Manchester Guardian thought that the script needed fine-tuning and concluded, "With time the cast will improve the play; no play could possibly improve the cast".

== Revivals and adaptations ==
In 1934 Walls directed a film adaptation of the play, the last of the original Aldwych stage farces to be filmed. Travers wrote the screenplay, and Walls, Lynn, Hare and James reprised their old stage roles. In 1970, the BBC televised a new production of the play, with Arthur Lowe and Richard Briers in the Walls and Lynn roles. As at 2013 the play has not been revived on the West End stage.
