= Lawrence P. Williams =

British film art director (1905–1996)

- Born: Lawrence Paul Williams; 10 August 1905; Slough, Buckinghamshire, England
- Died: 8 October 1996 (aged 91); Chinnor, South Oxfordshire, England
- Occupation: Art director
- Years active: 1929–1947
- Spouses: Queenie Leonard (m. 1936; div. 1947) Peggy Garratt (m. 1947; died 1990)
- Children: 1

Lawrence Paul Williams (10 August 1905 – 8 October 1996) was a British motion picture art director.

== Biography ==
Lawrence P. Williams was born in Slough, Buckinghamshire (now Berkshire) on 10 August 1905.

He married actress Queenie Leonard on 11 December 1936. The two divorced in 1947, and he remarried to Margaret Veda Elaine "Peggy" Garratt on 1 August of that year. They remained married until her death in 1990.

Williams died in Chinnor, South Oxfordshire on 8 October 1996, after a short illness.

== Filmography ==
- So Well Remembered (1947)
- Brief Encounter (1945) (as L.P. Williams)
- Forever and a Day (1943) (uncredited)
- Sunny (1941)
- No, No, Nanette (1940) (as L.P. Williams)
- Irene (1940) (as L.P. Williams)
- Nurse Edith Cavell (1939)
- Sixty Glorious Years (1938) (as L.P. Williams)
- A Yank at Oxford (1938) (as L.P. Williams)
- Victoria the Great (1937)
- Our Fighting Navy (1937)
- The Queen's Affair (1934)
- Nell Gwyn (1934) (as L.P. Williams)
- Yes, Mr. Brown (1933) (as L.P. Williams)
- The King's Cup (1933)
- Thark (1932)
- A Night Like This (1932)
- Plunder (1931)
- Carnival (1931) (as L. P. Williams)
- The Speckled Band (1931) (as L.P. Williams)
- Canaries Sometimes Sing (1930)
- School for Scandal (1930)
- Tons of Money (1930)
- On Approval (1930)
- Wolves (1930)

== Art department ==
- Mr. & Mrs. Smith (1941) (associate art director) (as L.P. Williams)
- Tom Brown's School Days (1940) (associate art director) (as L.P. Williams)
- Vigil in the Night (1940) (associate art director) (as L.P. Williams)
- The Loves of Robert Burns (1930) (assistant art director)
- The Woman in White (1929) (assistant art director)
- The Bondman (1929) (assistant art director)
- When Knights Were Bold (1929) (assistant art director)
