= Rookery Nook (film) =

1930 film

- Sheet music for featured song
- Directed by: Tom Walls
- Written by: W. P. Lipscomb; Ben Travers
- Based on: the farce by Ben Travers
- Produced by: Herbert Wilcox
- Starring: Tom Walls; Ralph Lynn; Winifred Shotter; Mary Brough
- Cinematography: Bernard Knowles; William Shenton
- Edited by: Maclean Rogers (uncredited)
- Production companies: Herbert Wilcox Productions (for); British & Dominions Film Corporation; The Gramophone Company
- Distributed by: Woolf & Freedman Film Service (UK); MGM (US)
- Release date: 11 February 1930 (London)
- Running time: 90 minutes
- Country: United Kingdom
- Language: English
- Budget: £14,000 or $270,000
- Box office: £150,000 (England) or $550,000 (UK)

Rookery Nook (U.S. title: One Embarrassing Night.) is a 1930 British film farce directed by Tom Walls and starring Ralph Lynn, Tom Walls, Winifred Shotter and Mary Brough, with a script by Ben Travers. It is a screen adaptation of the original 1926 Aldwych farce of the same title.

The film was very successful at the box office and led to a series of filmed farces.

== Synopsis ==
Rhoda Marley seeks refuge overnight from a tyrannical stepfather in the house of Gerald Popkiss. He is alone there, as his wife is away; fearing a scandal he attempts to conceal Rhoda's presence from nosy domestic staff and his in-laws, with the help of his cousin Clive. Eventually all is explained, Gerald and his wife are reconciled, and Clive pairs off with Rhoda.

== Cast ==
Source: British Film Institute. Cast members marked * were the creators of the roles in the original stage production.

- Ralph Lynn* as Gerald Popkiss
- Tom Walls* as Clive Popkiss
- Winifred Shotter* as Rhoda Marley
- Mary Brough* as Mrs Leverett
- Robertson Hare* as Harold Twine
- Ethel Coleridge* as Gertrude Twine
- Griffith Humphreys* as Putz
- Doreen Bendix as Poppy Dickey
- Margot Grahame as Clara Popkiss

== Production ==
The film was one of a very small number of productions made by Herbert Wilcox's British and Dominions Film Corporation in association with His Master's Voice ("The Gramophone Company", later EMI). The film used the cast of the original stage production. HMV terminated its association with British & Dominions in 1931 out of concern that the company's participation in producing comedy films such as Rookery Nook and Splinters (1929) would demean its corporate image, of which it was very protective during the early days of the Great Depression.

== Reception ==
Rookery Nook was voted the best British movie of 1930. According to one report, it was the most popular British film in Britain over the previous five years.

Kine Weekly wrote: "Highly entertaining and uproariously funny adaptation of the farce that had such a long run at the Adelphi Theatre. Acting and presentation are excellent. ... Ralph Lynn films very well, as does Tom Walls. Mary Brough is as good as always, and Winifred Shotter is delightful as the heroine. Harold is splendidly played by Robertson Hare, as is the sister-in-law by Ethel Coleridge. Tom Walls has not attempted anything except a straightforward camera representation of the play, but the lines are so witty and the reproductions so good that this does not matter. Direction of the artistes is first-rate, in spite of a slight tendency at times for them to look at the camera."

Variety wrote: "Production, direction, acting, casting, dialog and recording are all about foolproof for any kind of English speaking audience, and that goes for America, too. It is surprisingly non-theatrical; it avoids the fault apparent in many stage successes transferred to the screen of appearing like a photographed stage play. It is a motion picture with dialog, and most every line is a laugh, while practically all the situations are funny. Sophisticated comedy on the whole, it keeps clean; the people look and sound real, and the juvenile girl, Winifred Shotter, is one of the few this side who looks, sounds and troupes okay without appearing to have come from a suburban grammar school."
