= Aldwych Theatre =

West End theatre in London

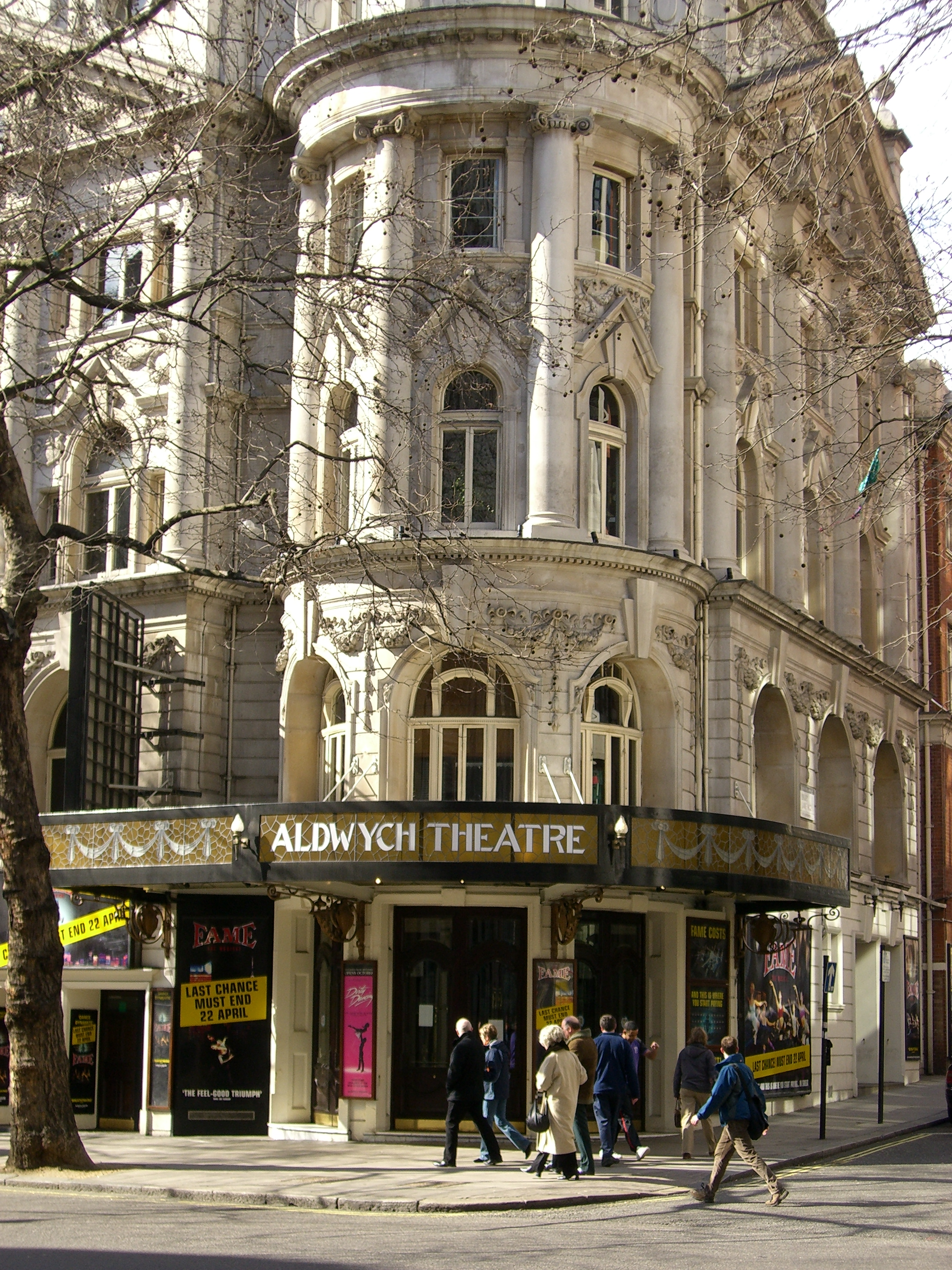
- Aldwych Theatre in 2006
- Interactive map of Aldwych Theatre
- Address: Aldwych; London, WC2; United Kingdom
- Coordinates: 51.512948°N 0.118634°W
- Owner: James Nederlander
- Capacity: 1,200
- Type: West End theatre
- Designation: Grade II
- Production: Sinatra: The Musical
- Public transit: Covent Garden

Construction
- Opened: 1905; 121 years ago
- Architect: W. G. R. Sprague

Website
- http://www.aldwychtheatre.com

The Aldwych Theatre is a West End theatre, located in Aldwych in the City of Westminster, central London. It was listed Grade II on 20 July 1971. Its seating capacity is 1,200 on three levels.

== History ==
=== Origins ===
The theatre was constructed in the newly built Aldwych as a pair with the Waldorf Theatre, now known as the Novello Theatre. Both buildings were designed in the Edwardian Baroque style by W. G. R. Sprague. The Aldwych Theatre was funded by Seymour Hicks in association with the American impresario Charles Frohman, and built by Walter Wallis of Balham.

The theatre opened on 23 December 1905 with a production of Blue Bell, a new version of Hicks's popular pantomime Bluebell in Fairyland. In 1906, Hicks's The Beauty of Bath, followed in 1907 by The Gay Gordons, played at the theatre. In February 1913, the theatre was used by Serge Diaghilev and Vaslav Nijinsky for the first rehearsals of Le Sacre du Printemps before its première in Paris during May. In 1920, Basil Rathbone played Major Wharton in The Unknown.

From 1923 to 1933, the theatre was the home of the series of twelve farces, known as the Aldwych farces, most of which were written by Ben Travers. Members of the regular company for these farces included Ralph Lynn, Tom Walls, Ethel Coleridge, Gordon James, Mary Brough, Winifred Shotter and Robertson Hare. In 1933, Richard Tauber presented and starred in a new version of Das Dreimäderlhaus at the Aldwych under the title Lilac Time. From the mid-1930s until about 1960, the theatre was owned by the Abrahams family.

=== Post-war years and the Royal Shakespeare Company ===
In 1949, Laurence Olivier directed the first London production of Tennessee Williams' A Streetcar Named Desire at the Aldwych Theatre. Starring as Blanche DuBois was Olivier's wife Vivien Leigh, who later won an Academy Award for the role in the 1951 film of Williams' play. Bonar Colleano co-starred as Stanley.

On 15 December 1960, after intense speculation, it was announced that the Royal Shakespeare Company, headquartered in Stratford-upon-Avon and under the directorship of Peter Hall, was to make the Aldwych Theatre its base in London for the next three years. In the event the company stayed for over 20 years, finally moving to the Barbican Arts Centre in 1982. The theatre was sold to the Nederlander Organization immediately afterwards. Among numerous RSC productions staged at this venue were The Wars of the Roses, "Ondine" with Peter Hall's wife Leslie Caron, The Greeks, and Nicholas Nickleby, as well as the transfer of most of the Shakespeare productions that were first staged at the RSC's Shakespeare Memorial Theatre in Stratford. During absences of the RSC, the theatre hosted the annual World Theatre Seasons, foreign plays in their original productions, invited to London by the theatre impresario Peter Daubeny, annually from 1964 to 1973 and finally in 1975. For his involvement with these Aldwych seasons, run without Arts Council or other official support, Daubeny won the Evening Standard special award in 1972.

In 1990–91, Joan Collins starred in a revival of Private Lives at the Aldwych. The theatre is referred to in Julio Cortázar's short story Instructions for John Howell (Instrucciones para John Howell) in the anthology All Fires the Fire (Todos los fuegos el fuego).

=== 21st century ===
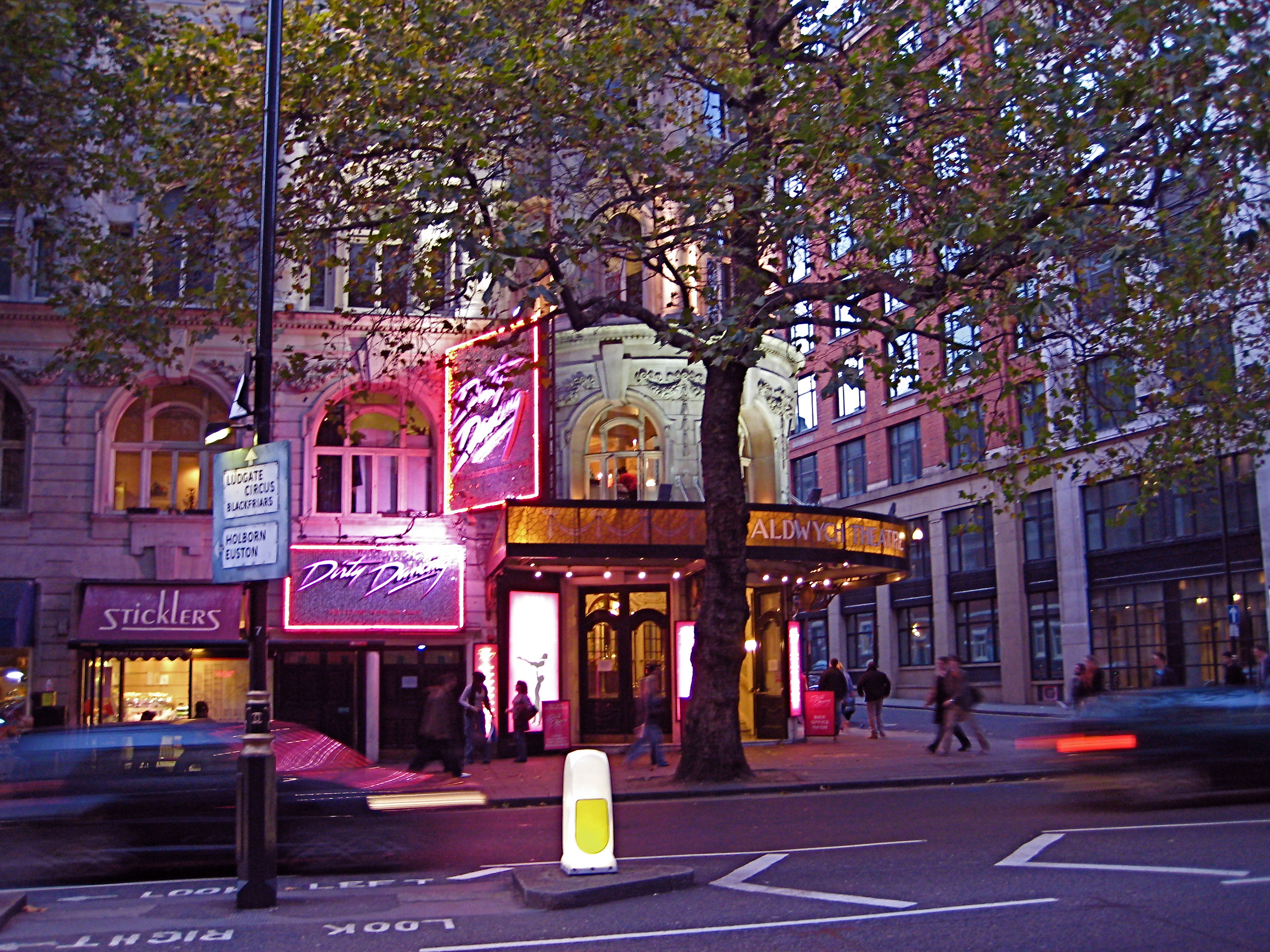
Dirty Dancing: The Classic Story on Stage playing at the theatre in 2007

Since 2000, the theatre has hosted a mixture of plays, comedies and musical theatre productions. Andrew Lloyd Webber's musical Whistle Down the Wind played until 2001, and Fame enjoyed an extended run from 2002 to 2006. From 2006 to 2011, it was the home to the British musical version of Dirty Dancing. Beautiful: The Carole King Musical ran from 2015 to 2017.

In March 2018, the theatre opened the world premiere of Tina: The Tina Turner Musical.

In 2025, the theatre hosted a limited engagement of Elf the Musical from 28 October 2025 - 3 January 2026.

== Productions ==
- The Beauty of Bath (1906)
- The Gay Gordons (1907)
- It Pays to Advertise (1923)
- A Cuckoo in the Nest (1925)
- Rookery Nook (1926)
- Thark (1927)
- Plunder (1928)
- A Cup of Kindness (1929)
- A Night Like This (1930)
- Little Ladyship (1939)
- As You Are (1940)
- Nap Hand (1940)
- Jane (1947)
- Letter from Paris (1952)
- The Little Glass Clock (1954) by Hugh Mills
- The Whole Truth (1955)
- Man Alive (1955)
- The Collection (1962) by Harold Pinter
- A Penny for a Song (1962) by John Whiting
- The Homecoming (1965) by Harold Pinter
- Old Times (1971) by Harold Pinter
- The Balcony (1971) by Jean Genet
- Travesties (1974) by Tom Stoppard
- Annie Get Your Gun (1986) by Irving Berlin, Dorothy Fields and Herbert Fields starring Suzi Quatro
- Hapgood (1988) by Tom Stoppard starring Felicity Kendal
- The Sneeze and Other Stories (1988-9) by Anton Chekhov starring Rowan Atkinson
- The Cherry Orchard by Anton Chekhov (1989–1990) starring Judi Dench and Lesley Manville
- Brand by Henrik Ibsen (1991)
- Private Lives (1990/91) by Noël Coward starring Joan Collins
- The Importance of Being Earnest (1993) by Oscar Wilde
- An Inspector Calls by JB Priestley (1993–1995)
- Indian Ink (1995–1996) by Tom Stoppard
- Whistle Down The Wind (1998–2001) by Andrew Lloyd Webber and Jim Steinman
- The Secret Garden (2001) by Lucy Simon and Marsha Norman
- Fame – The Musical (2002–2006) by Jacques Levy and Steve Margoshes
- Dirty Dancing – The Classic Story on Stage (2006–2011), by Eleanor Bergstein
- Top Hat (2012–2013)
- Stephen Ward (2013), music by Andrew Lloyd Webber
- Bring Up the Bodies, Royal Shakespeare Company (2014)
- Beautiful: The Carole King Musical (2015–2017), featuring the music of Carole King
- Tina: The Tina Turner Musical (2018–2025), featuring the music of Tina Turner
- Elf the Musical (limited engagement: 28 October 2025 - 3 January 2026), by Thomas Meehan, Bob Martin, Matthew Sklar and Chad Beguelin
- Sinatra (2026)
- Nanny McPhee (2027)

== Recent and current productions ==
- A Round-Heeled Woman (30 November 2011 – 14 January 2012)
- Top Hat the Musical (April 2012 – 26 October 2013) by Irving Berlin
- Stephen Ward the Musical (December 2013 – March 2014) by Andrew Lloyd Webber, Don Black and Christopher Hampton
- Beautiful: The Carole King Musical (25 February 2015 – 5 August 2017)
- La Soirée (16 November 2017 - 5 February 2018)
- Tina: The Tina Turner Musical (21 March 2018 – 13 September 2025)
- Elf the Musical (limited engagement: 28 October 2025 - 3 January 2026), by Thomas Meehan, Bob Martin, Matthew Sklar and Chad Beguelin

== Nearby tube stations ==
- Covent Garden
- Holborn
