= Chase the Ace (play) =

1935 play

Chase the Ace is a comedy thriller play by the British writer Anthony Kimmins. Originally staged in 1935 by the producer Harold French, it ran for 48 performances at Daly's Theatre in the West End. Amongst the original cast were Edward Chapman, Eric Portman, Michael Wilding, Patrick Barr, Warburton Gamble, Marie Lohr and Winifred Shotter. Wilding, a future film star, was making his West End debut.

== Bibliography ==
- Wearing, J.P. The London Stage 1930-1939: A Calendar of Productions, Performers, and Personnel. Rowman & Littlefield, 2014.
