= Plunder (play) =

Play written by Ben Travers

left to right, Ralph Lynn, Gordon James and Tom Walls in Plunder, 1928

Plunder is a farce by the English playwright Ben Travers. It was first given at the Aldwych Theatre, London, the fifth in the series of twelve Aldwych farces presented by the actor-manager Tom Walls at the theatre between 1923 and 1933. Several of the actors formed a regular core cast for the Aldwych farces. The play shows two friends committing a jewel robbery, for arguably honourable reasons, with fatal results.

The piece opened on 26 June 1928 and ran for 344 performances. Travers made a film adaptation, which Walls directed in 1933, with most of the leading members of the stage cast reprising their roles.

== Background ==
The actor-manager Tom Walls produced the series of Aldwych farces, nearly all written by Ben Travers, starring Walls and his co-star Ralph Lynn, who specialised in playing "silly ass" characters. Walls assembled a regular company of actors to fill the supporting roles, including Robertson Hare, who played a figure of put-upon respectability; Mary Brough in eccentric old lady roles; Ethel Coleridge as the severe voice of authority; Winifred Shotter as the sprightly young female lead; and the saturnine Gordon James.

Walls and his team had already enjoyed four substantial hits at the Aldwych, with It Pays to Advertise (1923), which had run for 598 performances; A Cuckoo in the Nest (1925, 376 performances); Rookery Nook (1926, 409 performances); and Thark (1927, 401 performances). All except the first of them were written by Ben Travers. The first two of his scripts were adaptations of his earlier novels. Thark was written with the Aldwych company in mind, with the supernatural as its theme. For Plunder Travers turned to robbery and violent death.

== Original cast ==
- Oswald Veal – Robertson Hare
- Prudence Malone – Ena Mason
- Mrs Hewlett – Mary Brough
- Simon Veal – Gordon James
- Freddie Malone – Tom Walls
- D'Arcy Tuck – Ralph Lynn
- Joan Hewlett – Winifred Shotter
- Sir George Chudleigh – Archibald Batty
- William – Robert Adam
- Mrs Orlock – Ethel Coleridge
- Chief Constable Grierson – Philip Carlton
- Chief Detective-inspector Sibley – Herbert Waring
- Police-constable Davies – Alfred Watson
- Detective-sergeant Marchant – Arthur Williams

== Synopsis ==
=== Act I ===
The library at Marvin Court, near Horsham, afternoon

D'Arcy Tuck has returned to England from Australia with his fiancée, Joan Hewlett, thinking that she has inherited a large country house and even larger fortune from her late grandfather. They find that the old man's housekeeper, the former Mrs Veal, now Mrs Hewlett, married him on his deathbed and inherited his entire estate. Her sinister brother Simon has an unspecified hold over her, and reminds her to follow his bidding.

Among the guests at the house is Freddy Malone, an old schoolfriend of Tuck, who is by profession a gentlemanly burglar of the A J Raffles type. Malone has a female accomplice, masquerading as his sister Prudence, with whom Mrs Hewlett's hapless son, Oswald Veal, is in love. Malone was already planning to rob Mrs Hewlett of her jewellery, and agrees to cut Tuck in on the crime, thus, as they see it, redressing the wrong she has done in contriving Joan's disinheritance.

=== Act II ===
Scene 1 – Hall of Freddy Malone's house, The Gables, Walton Heath

A roulette party is in progress. The players are Freddy's house guests, Mrs Hewlett, Oswald, Sir George and Lady Chudleigh, Harry Kenward and Ruth Bennett. After the game the guests go to bed. Tuck arrives, having deceived Joan about his destination. Owing to the carelessness of his manservant, Joan has discovered that Tuck is at The Gables, along with the despised Mrs Hewlett and Oswald Veal. To Tuck's discomfiture she enters and accuses him of trying to get round the old woman and wheedle some of Joan's rightful inheritance out of her. Simon Veal secretly tells Oswald to get Mrs Hewlett to write a cheque for a substantial sum, to be handed over to Simon at three o'clock, when the other guests are asleep. Tuck and Malone are finally left alone; they go over the details of their planned robbery.

Scene 2 – A room at The Gables

Tuck and Malone creep into Mrs Hewlett's bedroom. Tuck accidentally sniffs the chloroform they have brought to dope her with. He falls on the bed beside her and then reels round the room, nearly bringing the attempted robbery to a standstill. Malone and Tuck are interrupted by the appearance outside the window of Simon Veal, who has come for the cheque he has demanded. Malone flings a towel over Veal's head; Veal falls off his ladder into a greenhouse. The robbers make their escape with Mrs Hewlett's jewels as she wakes and raises the alarm.

Scene 3 – Hall of The Gables

The household assembles. Mrs Hewlett tells them of the robbery. Chudleigh reports that Simon Veal has been found unconscious in the greenhouse. The guests give various accounts of what they have seen and done in the past hour. Joan realises the truth, and privately berates Tuck for his stupidity in taking part in the robbery. The police arrive, and Chudleigh tells Malone that Simon Veal has been pronounced dead. Malone explains privately to Tuck that though Veal's fall was accidental, their part in it, during the course of a robbery, renders them liable to the capital charge of murder.

=== Act III ===
Scene 1 – Chief Constable Grierson's office at Scotland Yard

At Scotland Yard the police discuss the case among themselves. They strongly suspect Malone and Tuck. They have discovered that Prudence is not Malone's sister, that he has no obvious means to support his lavish life-style, and that he has been in situ at the time of several notable country house robberies.

Inspector Sibley questions Malone and Tuck in turn. They get through their interrogations, Malone by his suave cleverness and Tuck by his baffling idiocy, which completely entangles Sibley. They leave. Sibley continues to suspect the pair, and is confident of their imminent arrest.

Scene 2 – Hall of The Gables

Malone and Tuck question Oswald Veal who reluctantly admits that Simon was blackmailing Mrs Hewlett: when she purportedly married old Mr Hewlett, she was still married to her first husband. Malone and Tuck confront her with the truth, and frighten her into telling the police that the robber was Simon. When Sibley has departed, frustrated, Malone tells Mrs Hewlett that she and Joan will have to come to an arrangement about the division of old Mr Hewlett's estate. He tells her, "In future, be honest. It pays in the end". After she has gone he says the same to Tuck, who vows never to engage in crime again.

== Reception ==
The Times thought the piece "a very entertaining piece of nonsense … Miss Mary Brough bounces through it all with hearty accomplishment; Miss Winifred Shotter decorates it prettily; Mr. Gordon James and Mr. Robertson Hare contribute the farce of solemnity … Mr. Walls and Mr. Lynn at Scotland Yard are delightful". The Observer critic wrote of his "grateful laughter", found the entire cast "in tip-top form" and predicted "A year's hard labour" for them all. The Manchester Guardian called the piece, "an exquisitely involved, briskly moving and thoroughly funny show." The Illustrated London News declared it "London's funniest play".

By the time of the play's second London revival, in 1996, Michael Billington in The Guardian found the piece uncomfortably dated in its snobbish attitudes to class and its sexism, both, in his view exemplified by the slighting remarks about the fat, proletarian character Mrs Hewlett, originally played by Mary Brough. He concluded that Travers assumed that "you can get away with theft, and even an accidental killing, as long as you are well-bred old school chums."

== Revivals and adaptations ==
In 1933 Walls directed a film adaptation of the play. Travers wrote the screenplay, and Walls, Lynn, Hare, Brough, Shotter and James reprised their old stage roles.

The first full-scale professional stage revival of Plunder was at the Bristol Old Vic in 1973, directed by Nat Brenner, with Edward Hardwicke and Peter O'Toole in the Walls and Lynn roles. In 1976 Michael Blakemore directed a production for the National Theatre, which opened at the Old Vic in London, and transferred to the new Lyttelton Theatre in March of the same year. The two main roles were played by Frank Finlay and Dinsdale Landen, with a supporting cast including Diana Quick, Polly Adams and Dandy Nichols. In 1996 Kevin McNally and Griff Rhys Jones starred in a production at the Savoy Theatre, directed by Peter James.

In 2016, Eton College staged Plunder at their Farrer Theatre. This was to be director's Angus Graham-Campbell's last play after more than 30 years at the school.
