= Chase the Ace =

Form of lottery

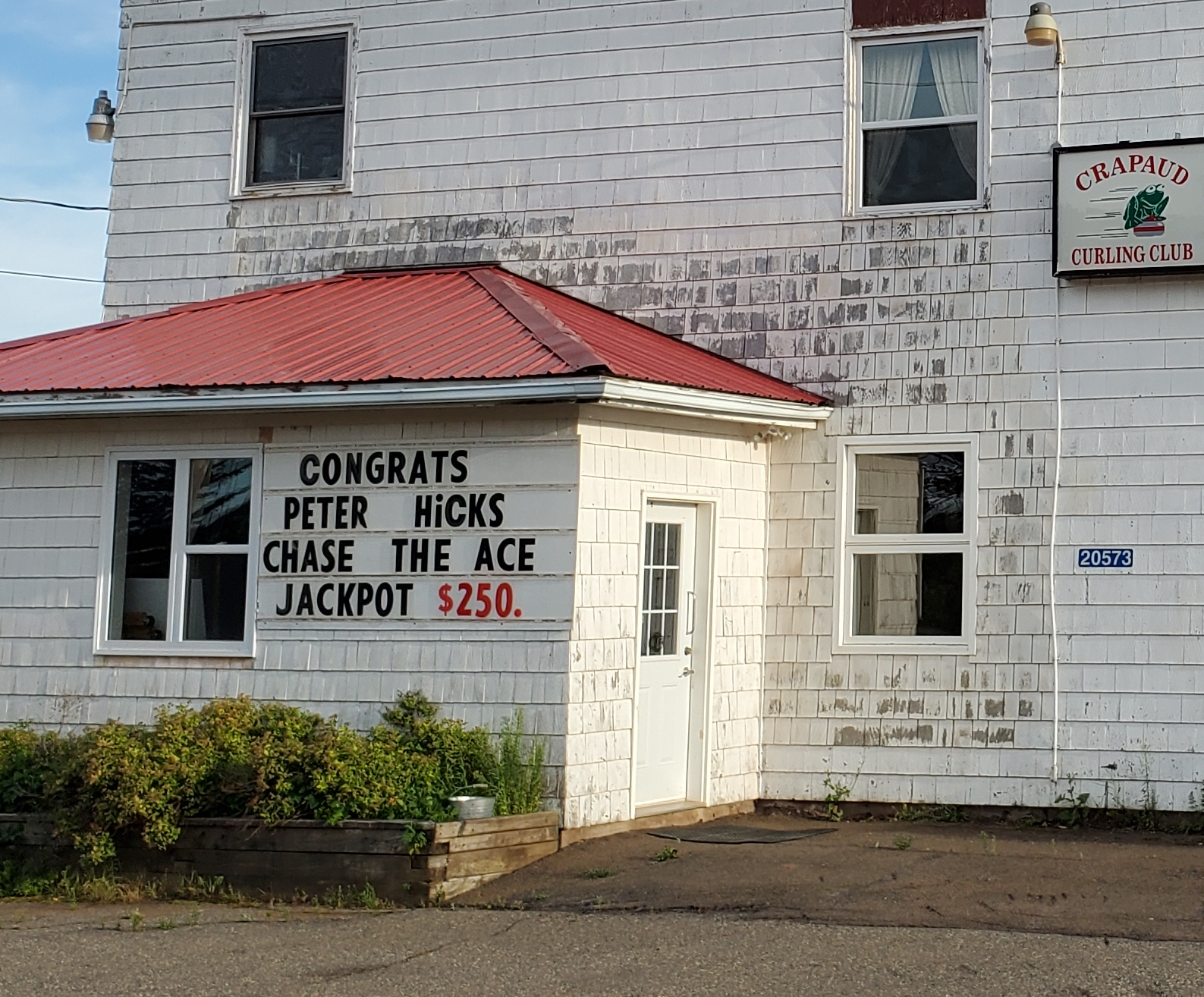
Chase the Ace lottery in the rural community of Crapaud, Prince Edward Island

Chase the Ace is a form of lottery that initially gained popularity in parts of Canada in 2013, with the game later spreading internationally. It is also known as Crown the King and Jig the Joker.

The game has been used to raise funds for charities. In Australia it is a popular sales promotion in hospitality venues such as pubs.

== Description ==
For each draw participants buy lottery tickets. The lottery winner then draws a card from a deck of playing cards and wins an accumulated jackpot if the ace of spades is drawn. If not, the reduced deck is kept for the next draw's game, and the jackpot rolls over to the next draw. The jackpot accumulates from draw to draw until it is won, and the game is then over or restarts with a new jackpot.

The funds from ticket sales are usually divided into three parts. Typically the organizers keep 50%, the winner of the lottery draw takes 20%, and the remaining 30% goes into the jackpot.

In Australia, the game is a popular weekly sales promotion in hospitality venues such as pubs and taverns, with participants receiving tickets with a food or alcoholic drink purchase.

== History ==
In 2013, the community of Noel, Nova Scotia copied the idea from a fundraiser in Inuvik to raise funds to install floodlights at their ball field. They were the first organization to be given a licence for the game in Nova Scotia, and eventually gave away a jackpot of $209,752.50. In September 2015 about 300 lottery licences for Chase the Ace games had been issued in Nova Scotia during the previous twelve months. Similarly successful lotteries have taken place during 2015 in Newfoundland and Labrador and Prince Edward Island.

In the summer of 2015, a game in Inverness, Nova Scotia which started in 2014 had accumulated a large jackpot and was drawing large crowds to the village—approximately ten times the resident population—and requiring extra venues and car parking, as well as a temporary cellphone tower. After the event on 26 September 2015, when the jackpot had reached nearly $1.5 million and the ace was not drawn from the remaining deck of six cards, organizers declared that the following Saturday would be the final date for the lottery, with the rules changed to ensure that the jackpot would be won. If the initial lottery winner did not draw the ace, another ticket would be selected, with the winner receiving a consolation prize of $25,000 and a chance to draw a card. More draws and consolation prizes would be awarded in this manner until the ace was picked. The decision to terminate the game was made due to concerns over public safety and lack of facilities such as washrooms. The ace was finally drawn from a deck of just three cards; the winner won a jackpot of $1.7 million.

A Chase the Ace in Sydney, Nova Scotia saw significant participation, having reached a record jackpot of $2.6 million as of May 2016 and five cards remaining. On May 7, 2016, the $2.9 million jackpot was won by Kathy McPherson. The organizers, as well as McPherson (who previously lived in the city) announced intents to donate portions of their earnings to relief efforts for the Fort McMurray wildfire.

In the summer of 2018, a $1.2-million Chase the Ace jackpot won at a fundraiser for two area fire departments in Margaree Forks, Cape Breton, led to a family dispute and legal battle between a 57 year-old woman and her 19 year-old nephew. The woman claimed she never intended to share winnings with the young man, despite both their names appearing on the winning ticket, purchased by the nephew but paid for by the aunt. Unhappy that the fundraiser's organizer had issued two cheques of $611,319 for the co-winners, the woman sued her nephew. The matter was settled out of court, with the aunt getting $872,639 of the $1,222,639 prize and the nephew receiving $350,000.

In 2021, the West Central Tribune highlighted examples of Chase the Ace games in the U.S. state of South Dakota.
