= Woolf & Freedman Film Service =

1919–1934 UK film distributor

Woolf & Freedman Film Service was a UK film distributor which was founded by film producer C. M. Woolf, and which operated from 1919 to 1934. The company distributed more than 140 films over a 15-year period. In 1935, Woolf formed a new company, General Film Distributors.

Some of Alfred Hitchcock's early silent films were produced by Gainsborough Pictures and distributed by Woolf & Freedman.

== Partial filmography ==
- The Fire Raisers (1934)
- A Cuckoo in the Nest (1933)
- Early to Bed (1933)
- Channel Crossing (1933)
- Leave It to Smith (1933)
- I Was a Spy (1933)
- The Ghoul (1933)
- Prince of Arcadia (1933)
- My Lucky Star (1933)
- Waltz Time (1933)
- Falling for You (1933)
- I Lived With You (1933)
- It's a Boy (1933)
- Yes, Mr. Brown (1933)
- The Woman in Command (1933)
- The Blarney Kiss (1933)
- The Little Damozel (1933)
- It's a King (1933)
- Just My Luck (1933)
- The King's Cup (1933)
- Up for the Derby (1933)
- The Midshipmaid (1932)
- Say It With Music (1932)
- Be Mine Tonight (1932)
- The Flag Lieutenant (1932)
- Leap Year (1932)
- The Lodger (1932) a.k.a. The Phantom Fiend in the US
- The Mayor's Nest (1932)
- The Love Contract (1932)
- Thark (1932)
- Love on Wheels (1932)
- White Face (1932) a.k.a. Edgar Wallace's White Face the Fiend
- A Night Like This (1932)
- The Chinese Puzzle (1932)
- Murder at Covent Garden (1932)
- Condemned to Death (1932)
- Happy Ever After (1932)
- The Blue Danube (1932)
- Mischief (1931)
- Splinters in the Navy (1931)
- Venetian Nights (1931)
- The Ghost Train (1931)
- Almost a Divorce (1931)
- Black Coffee (1931)
- Captivation (1931)
- The Calendar (1931) released in the US as Bachelor's Folly
- The Chance of a Night Time (1931)
- The Lyons Mail (1931)
- Alibi (1931)
- The Speckled Band (1931)
- Madame Guillotine (1931)
- Third Time Lucky (1931)
- Plunder (1931)
- Up for the Cup (1931)
- Tons of Money (1930)
- Just for a Song (1930)
- Canaries Sometimes Sing (1930)
- Once a Gentleman (1930)
- On Approval (1930)
- Hell's Island (1930)
- Sisters (1930)
- Temptation (1930)
- Wolves (1930)
- The Big Fight (1930)
- Call of the West (1930)
- Soldiers and Women (1930)
- Around the Corner (1930)
- Cock o' the Walk (1930)
- Journey's End (1930)
- Ladies of Leisure (1930)
- Prince of Diamonds (1930)
- A Royal Romance (1930)
- Tembi (1930)
- Guilty? (1930)
- The Loves of Robert Burns (1930)
- Personality (1930)
- One Embarrassing Night (1930)
- Peace of Mind (1930)
- Mexicali Rose (1929)
- Splinters (1929)
- Woman to Woman (1929)
- Flight (1929)
- City of Play (1929)
- The Wrecker (1929)
- Taxi for Two (1929)
- The Crooked Billet (1929)
- The Return of the Rat (1929)
- The Woman in White (1929)
- The Bondman (1929)
- The Burgomaster of Stilemonde (1929)
- Black Waters (1929)
- When Knights Were Bold (1929)
- A Peep Behind the Scenes (1929)
- A Light Woman (1928)
- Haus Nummer 17 (1928)
- The Scarlet Daredevil (1928)
- The First Born (1928)
- A South Sea Bubble (1928)
- Balaclava (1928)
- The Rolling Road (1928)
- The Vortex (1928)
- Easy Virtue (1928)
- Victory (1928)
- Dawn (1928)
- The Constant Nymph (1928)
- A Window in Piccadilly (1928)
- The Gallant Hussar (1928)
- The Blue Peter (1928)
- Cinders (1927)
- One of the Best (1927)
- Der Geisterzug (1927)
- Downhill (1927) a.k.a. When Boys Leave Home in the US
- The Queen Was in the Parlour (1927)
- Blighty (1927)
- The Lodger: A Story of the London Fog (1927)
- Mumsie (1927)
- The Rat (1926)
- The Triumph of the Rat (1926)
- The Mountain Eagle (1926)
- The Sea Urchin (1926) a.k.a. The Cabaret Kid
- A Typical Budget (1925)*
- Battling Bruisers (1925)*
- Cut It Out (1925)*
- So This Is Jollygood (1925)*
- The Blunderland of Big Game (1925)*
- Satan's Sister (1925)
- Polar Bonzo (1925)
- White Shadows (1924)
- Bonzo (1924)
- Jail Birds (1924)
- Mumming Birds (1924)
- Woman to Woman (1923)
- A Gamble With Hearts (1923)
- Early Birds (1923)
- Billy's Rose (1922)
- Fallen by the Way (1922)
- In the Signal Box (1922)
- Sal Grogan's Face (1922)
- Sir Rupert's Wife (1922)
- The Lights o' London (1922)
- The Magic Wand (1922)
- The Old Actor's Story (1922)
- The Parson's Fight (1922)
- The Road to Heaven (1922)
- The Street Tumblers (1922)
- Ticket o' Leave (1922)
- Damaged Goods (1919)

(*) Short comedy films directed by Adrian Brunel
