= Yvonne Arnaud =

French pianist, singer, actress (1890–1958)

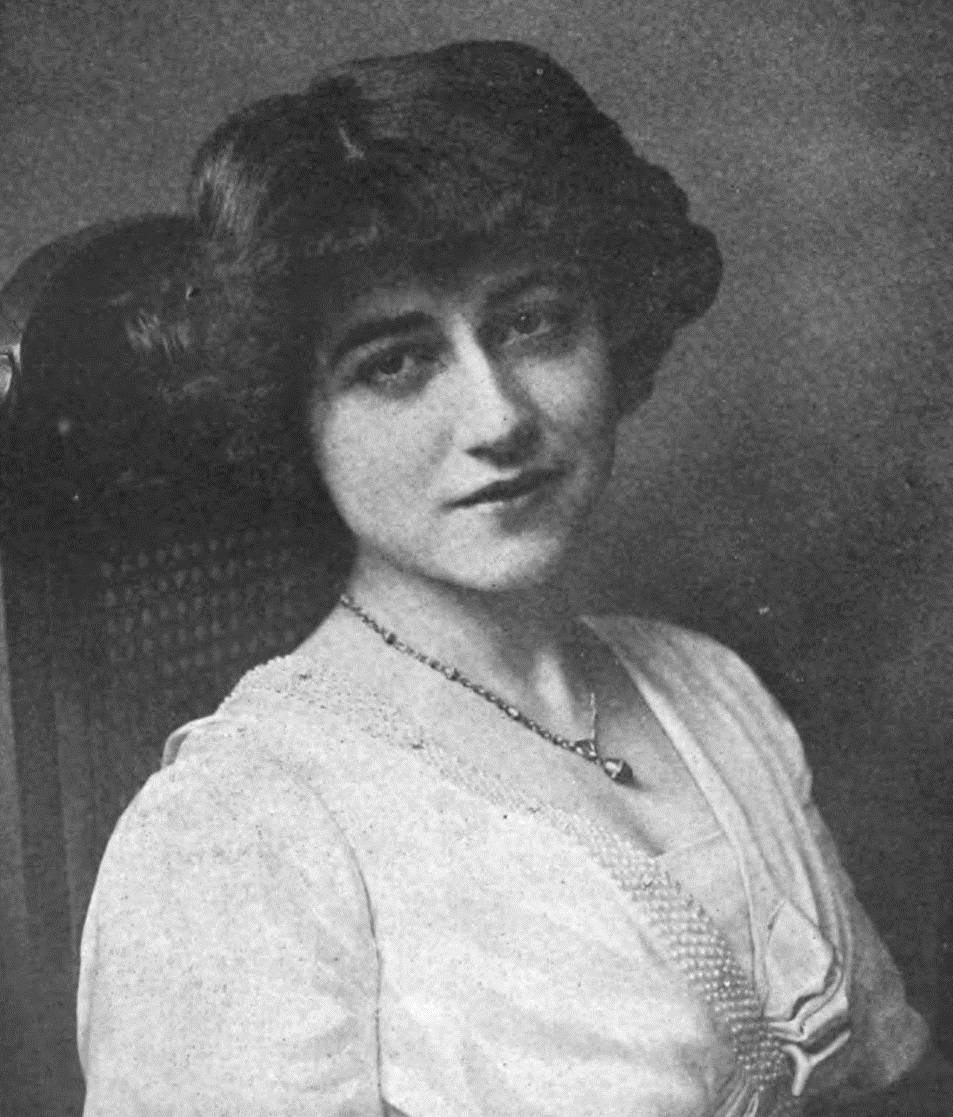
- Arnaud, c. 1913
- Born: 20 December 1890; Bordeaux, Gironde, France
- Died: 20 September 1958 (aged 67); Guildford, Surrey, UK
- Occupations: Pianist, singer, actress
- Years active: 1911–1958
- Spouse: Hugh McLellan

Germaine Yvonne Arnaud (20 December 1890 – 20 September 1958) was a French-born pianist, singer and actress, who was well known for her career in Britain, as well as her native land. After beginning a career as a concert pianist as a child, Arnaud acted in musical comedies. She switched to non-musical comedy and drama around 1920 and was one of the players in the second of the Aldwych farces, A Cuckoo in the Nest, a hit in 1925. She also had dramatic roles and made films in the 1930s and 1940s, and continued to act into the 1950s. She occasionally performed as a pianist later in her career. The Yvonne Arnaud Theatre was named in her memory in Guildford, Surrey.

== Life and career ==
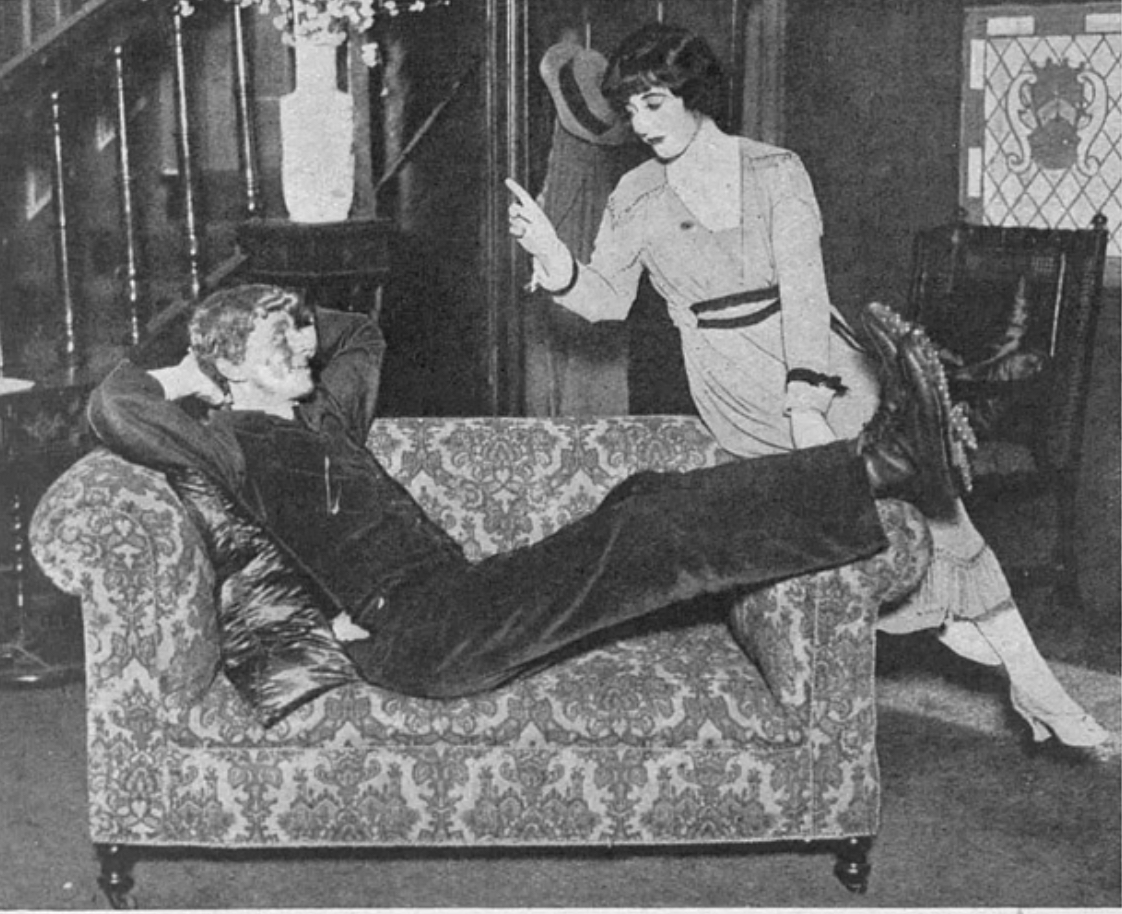
Arnaud starring as Lucille alongside Ernest Thesiger as Ambrose in the stage play "A Week End". Lucille is a French woman who has a passion for blond men and is Ambrose's love interest.

Arnaud was the daughter of Charles Leon Arnaud and his wife Antoinette (née Montegut). She was brought up in Paris and entered the Paris Conservatoire aged 9, studying piano under Alphonse Duvernoy and other teachers. In 1905, she won the conservatory's Premier Prix for piano. Beginning that year, aged 14, until 1911, she performed with leading orchestras throughout Europe and the US, under conductors such as Édouard Colonne, Arthur Nikisch, Willem Mengelberg, Vasily Safonov, Gustav Mahler and Alexander Siloti.

In 1911 she decided to try the stage instead of the concert hall and obtained an engagement at London's Adelphi Theatre as understudy to Elsie Spain in the role of Princess Mathilde in The Quaker Girl, first going on stage in that role on 7 August 1911. She next played the leading role of Suzanne in the musical The Girl in the Taxi (1912), earning popularity with her vivacity and charming French accent. One reviewer wrote: "Arnaud is as clever as her ways are charming, and her voice is beautiful". This was followed by roles in more musical comedies, farces and operettas, including as Noisette in Mam'selle Tralala in 1914 (revived the following year as Oh! Be Careful), two revivals of "The Girl in the Taxi" (in 1913 and 1915), in Harry Grattan's Odds and Ends (1914), Excuse Me! (1915), as Lucille in A Week-End (1918), and Phrynette in L'Enfant Prodigue, in which she also played the piano. She also had a lead in Kissing Time (1919).

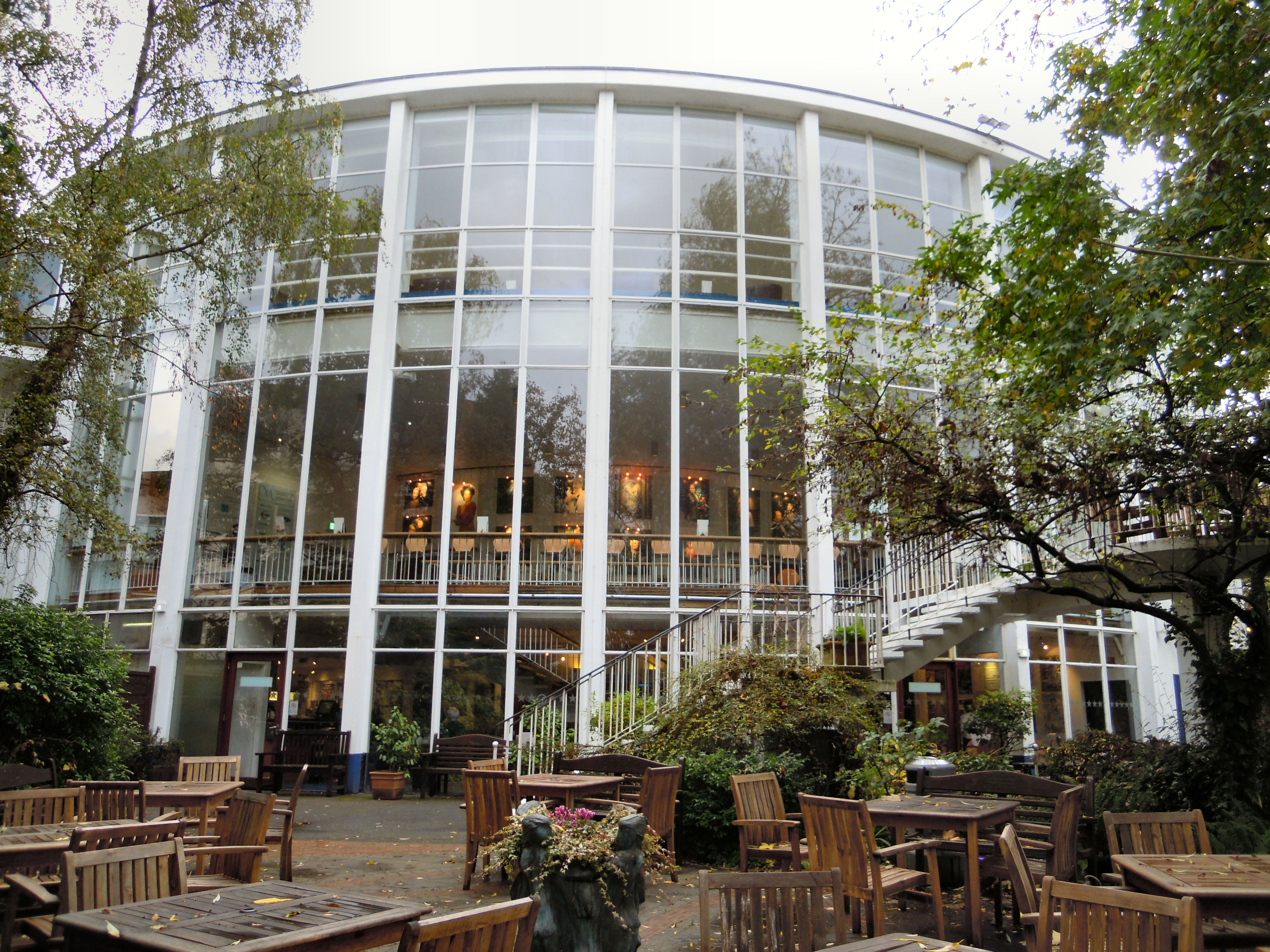
The Yvonne Arnaud Theatre in Guildford is named in her honour

After this, an operation damaged her vocal cords, and so she switched from musicals to plays, beginning with the role of Louise Allington in the farce Tons of Money, which ran for nearly two years at the Shaftesbury Theatre from 1922. Her success in this play led to her appearance in the second of the Aldwych farces as Marguerite in A Cuckoo in the Nest, by Ben Travers, which was a hit in 1925. Other comic roles included Mrs. Pepys in J.B. Fagan's And So to Bed (1926) and the title role in Fagan's The Improper Duchess (1931). In 1927 she travelled to New York where she repeated the Mrs. Pepys on Broadway at the Shubert Theatre.

She also appeared in British films, beginning with the role of Pauline in Desire, in 1920, opposite Dennis Neilson-Terry. In 1929–30, she played the role of Elma Melton in the stage version (both London and New York) and then the film version of Frederick Lonsdale's Canaries Sometimes Sing. She also appeared in some dramatic roles in the 1930s and 1940s, including some Shakespearean roles. Among these were several productions of Love for Love during the Second World War. Arnaud made more films during the 1930s and 1940s, including film versions of some of the successful plays in which she had starred. Arnaud's likeness was drawn in caricature by Alex Gard for Sardi's, the New York City theatre district restaurant. The picture is now part of the collection of the New York Public Library. She continued to act on stage well into the 1950s. In 1958 she appeared in the West End with Jack Hulbert in Ronald Millar's The Big Tickle.

She still occasionally performed as a pianist later in her career, for example, with the Hallé Orchestra under Sir John Barbirolli in Manchester in 1948. She was also the soloist at the premiere of Franz Reizenstein's pastiche Concerto Popolare at the 1956 Hoffnung Festival (having been chosen after Eileen Joyce declined).

== Personal life ==
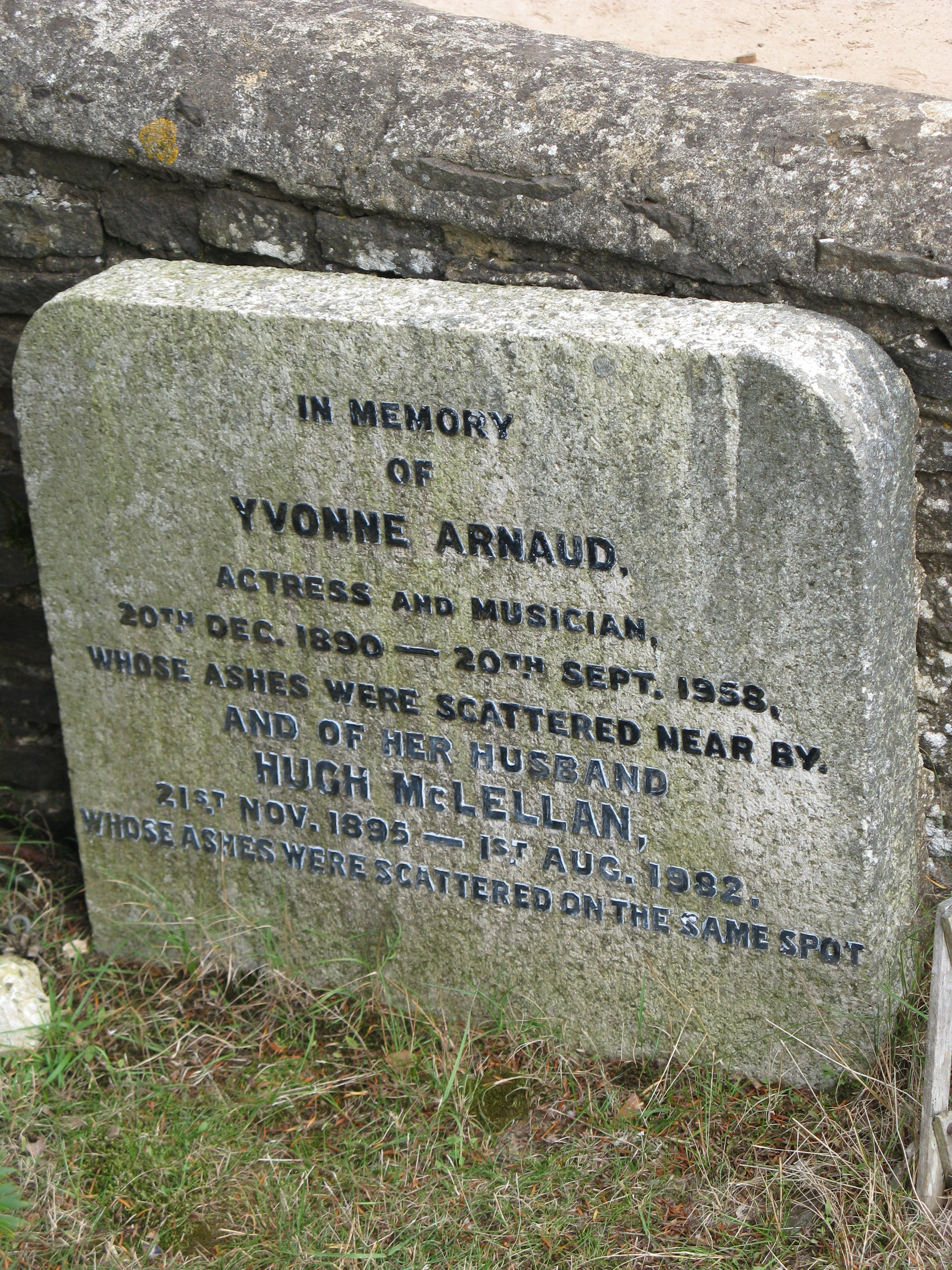
Yvonne Arnaud's memorial in the churchyard of St. Martha's on the Hill

In 1920, Arnaud married the actor Hugh McLellan, son of C. M. S. McLellan. She was a president of the League Against Cruel Sports from 1948 to 1951. She was also godmother to the writer Oriel Malet, and was the subject of Malet's book Marraine: a portrait of my godmother (1961).

For many years she lived in Guildford, Surrey, where she died. Her ashes were scattered in St. Martha's churchyard on St. Martha's Hill just south-east of Guildford, and there is a memorial to her on the church grounds. In 1965 the Yvonne Arnaud Theatre was opened in the town.

== Complete filmography ==
- Desire (1920)
- The Temptress (1920)
- On Approval (1930)
- Canaries Sometimes Sing (1930)
- Tons of Money (1930)
- A Cuckoo in the Nest (1933)
- Princess Charming (1934)
- Lady in Danger (1934)
- Widow's Might (1935)
- Stormy Weather (1935)
- The Improper Duchess (1936)
- The Gay Adventure (1936)
- Neutral Port (1940)
- Tomorrow We Live (1943)
- Woman to Woman (1947)
- Everyman (1947 TV movie)
- The Ghosts of Berkeley Square (1947)
- Madame Pepita (1952 TV movie)
- Mon oncle (1958)
