= Rookery Nook (play) =

Play written by Ben Travers

Scene from original 1926 production, with, from left, Tom Walls, Robertson Hare and Ralph Lynn

Rookery Nook is a farce by the English playwright Ben Travers based on his own 1923 novel. It was first given at the Aldwych Theatre, London, the third in the series of twelve Aldwych farces presented by the actor-manager Tom Walls at the theatre between 1923 and 1933. Several of the actors formed a regular core cast for the Aldwych farces. The play depicts the complications that ensue when a young woman, dressed in pyjamas, seeks refuge from her bullying stepfather at a country house in the middle of the night.

The play was first performed in 1926 at the Aldwych Theatre and ran for 409 performances. In 1930 Walls directed a filmed version of the play, with most of the same performers, and the piece has been revived and adapted as a musical.

== Background and first production ==
The actor-manager Tom Walls, initially together with Leslie Henson, produced the series of Aldwych farces, nearly all written by Ben Travers, starring Walls and his co-star Ralph Lynn, who specialised in playing "silly ass" characters. Walls assembled a regular company of actors to fill the supporting roles. For the first few productions, the company included Robertson Hare, as a figure of put-upon respectability; Mary Brough in eccentric old lady roles; Ethel Coleridge as the severe voice of authority, Winifred Shotter as the sprightly young female lead; and the saturnine Gordon James.

Rookery Nook was Ben Travers's second play for the company, and was based on a farcical novel he had published three years earlier. The play was first performed on 13 June 1926 at the Aldwych Theatre in London, the third of the Aldwych farces, and ran for 409 performances. Walls and his team had already enjoyed two substantial hits at the Aldwych, with It Pays to Advertise (1923), which had run for 598 performances, and Travers's A Cuckoo in the Nest (1925, 376 performances).

== Original cast ==
- Gertrude Twine – Ethel Coleridge
- Mrs Leverett – Mary Brough
- Harold Twine – Robertson Hare
- Clive Popkiss – Tom Walls
- Gerald Popkiss – Ralph Lynn
- Rhoda Marley – Winifred Shotter
- Putz – Griffith Humphreys
- Admiral Juddy – Gordon James
- Poppy Dickey – Ena Mason
- Clara Popkiss – Stella Bonheur
- Mrs Possett – Vera Gerald

== Synopsis ==
The action takes place on a summer night in the lounge-hall of "Rookery Nook", a house at Chumpton-on-Sea, Somerset.

=== Act I ===
The formidable Gertrude Twine has arranged for her newly-wed sister, Clara Popkiss, and husband Gerald Popkiss, to stay at Rookery Nook after their honeymoon. Gertrude and her henpecked husband Harold live nearby. Clive Popkiss, Gerald's cousin, is staying with the Twines, and when Gerald arrives Clive is at Rookery Nook to greet him.

Except for a larger-than-life daily charwoman, Mrs Leverett, Gerald is temporarily on his own at Rookery Nook, Clara having gone to visit her mother. After Clive leaves, Gerald's solitude is interrupted by the incursion of a young woman, barefoot, wet, and wearing only pyjamas. She is Rhoda Marley, who lives nearby with her ferocious Prussian stepfather, Putz. He has thrown her out of his house for some trivial offence. Gerald lends her a pair of dry pyjamas and a dressing gown. She has nowhere else to go, and the gallant Gerald agrees to give her refuge at Rookery Nook.

Putz comes to the house with his dog, looking for Rhoda, but, thwarted, he departs in a loud rage. Gerald cedes the main bedroom to Rhoda. He is extremely uneasy and fears that, despite the purity of his intentions, there will be a scandal. The worldly Clive discovers the situation and gives Gerald moral support. Gertrude and Harold Twine enter, and Rhoda hides in the kitchen. Harold finds her there and is hastily sworn to secrecy by Clive and Gerald, though he is terrified that Gertrude will discover that he has deceived her. Clive assures him that he will explain everything in the morning.

=== Act II ===
From left Tom Walls, Ralph Lynn, Stella Bonheur and Ena Mason

The following day, Harold turns up to hear Clive's explanation. Unknown to the men, Mrs Leverett and Gertrude Twine also arrive; they see Rhoda coming out of Gerald's bedroom and are in haste to tell Clara about it. Clive and Gerald bully Harold into going to fetch some clothes for Rhoda so that she can leave the house and escape to London to stay with friends. While Harold is away on this errand, a further intruder, Admiral Juddy, arrives at Rookery Nook demanding to know why Harold has failed to turn up as agreed for a round of golf.

Clive, who has taken strongly to Rhoda, offers to drive her to London. Harold returns, having failed to secure any of Rhoda's own clothes from Putz's house: Putz set the dog on him, and he fled. Instead, Harold has brought some of his wife's clothes, but Putz, wise to the scheme to rescue Rhoda, takes them from him.

=== Act III ===
Admiral Juddy has heard from Harold that Rhoda is hiding at Rookery Nook. He calls to offer her refuge at his house, but the lack of respectable daytime clothes for her to appear in remains an unsolved problem. Poppy Dickey, a lively young woman from the village, calls, collecting for charity. Rhoda persuades her to lend her the clothes she is wearing, and thus clad Rhoda escapes. Alerted by her meddling sister Gertrude, Clara arrives. She confronts Gerald, whose answer is to throw open the bedroom door, trusting that Clara will see that Rhoda is an innocent damsel in distress. Instead Clara finds Poppy, in her underwear. Gerald attempts to explain about the lunatic Putz and his conduct to Rhoda, but this line falls flat when Putz himself appears, and, to thwart Gerald and Clive's plans, behaves with exaggerated restraint and courtesy.

Gerald is floundering until Rhoda shows up to thank him for his help, along with Clive, who accuses Mrs Leverett of spreading malicious gossip about Rhoda. Mrs Leverett protests that it was Gertrude who started the rumour that Rhoda was not Putz's stepdaughter but his mistress. Putz, hearing their scandalous accusation, flies into a towering rage, substantiating Gerald's explanation. Gerald and Clara are reconciled and Clive happily pairs off with Rhoda.

== Critical reception ==
The Times praised the cast and concluded: "With them, and with the whole rippling foolery, the audience with good reason was delighted. The Observer thought the piece "an excellent farce … played to perfection", and warned of the need for physical endurance to cope with a whole evening of such laughter as the play provoked. When the piece was revived in 1979, Michael Billington praised its "wonderful combination of panic and innocence". In 2005, Charles Spencer wrote in The Daily Telegraph, "Beneath the laughter, Rookery Nook is blessed with a robust tolerance, celebrating sexual desire and human frailty, even as it deplores those gossips addicted to 'vile scandals, venomous libels, and dirty little tattling tea parties'. In this respect, at least, Travers still has something to say to the England of today." In The Cambridge Illustrated History of British Theatre (2000), Simon Trussler writes of "incipient tumult fed by a commodious stairway and lots of practical entrances, is characteristic of a genre whose no less incipient (but usually just avoided) combination of social and sexual disasters Coward had also exploited in Hay Fever (1924)".

== Revivals and adaptations ==
The piece was revived in 1942, with Lynn in his original part ("as masterly as ever", according to The Times). A musical version, titled Popkiss, was staged at the Globe Theatre in 1972, with Daniel Massey and John Standing in the Lynn and Walls roles. The piece was adapted by Michael Ashton, with music by John Addison and David Heneker. Travers's original play was revived at Her Majesty's Theatre in 1979, with Nicky Henson and Terence Frisby in the main roles. A 1986 revival at the Shaftesbury Theatre starred Tom Courtenay and Ian Ogilvy. There was a further London production in 2009 at the Menier Chocolate Factory.

In 1930 Walls directed a film version, a joint production by the Gramophone Company (HMV) and the British & Dominions Film Corporation. Lynn and Walls led a cast mostly comprising the original stage actors. The film earned £100,000 at the British box office, three times the usual amount for a British film.

The BBC has televised the play four times. The first was in 1947, with Shotter in her original stage role as Rhoda, with Jack Melford as Clive, Desmond Walter-Ellis as Gerald and Eleanor Summerfield as Poppy Dickey. A 1953 production starred Peter Cushing as Clive, with David Stoll as Gerald and Beryl Bainbridge as Rhoda. Brian Rix as Gerald headed the cast in a Whitehall production screened in 1965, with Moray Watson as Clive, Joan Sanderson as Mrs Leverett, Sheila Mercier as Gertrude Twine, Larry Noble as Harold Twine, Isla Blair as Rhoda, Leo Franklyn as Admiral Juddy and Jean Marsh as Poppy Dickey. For a production in 1970 Richard Briers played Gerald and Watson again played Clive; Arthur Lowe was Harold Twine, Elizabeth Knight played Rhoda, Irene Handl was Mrs Leverett, and Mary Millar was Poppy.

A BBC Radio 4 dramatisation was broadcast in 1985, with Ian Lavender and Brett Usher as Gerald and Clive, John Grillo as Harold and Jenny Funnell as Poppy. Elsewhere, the play was broadcast on Australian radio in 1941 with a cast including Lloyd Lamble and Shirley Ann Richards.

== Sources ==
- Gaye, Freda, ed. (1967). Who's Who in the Theatre (fourteenth ed.). London: Sir Isaac Pitman and Sons. OCLC 5997224.
- Trussler, Simon (2000). The Cambridge Illustrated History of British Theatre. Cambridge: Cambridge University Press. ISBN 978-0-52-179430-5.
