= Tom Walls =

British actor and director (1883–1949)

Walls in 1925

Thomas Kirby Walls (18 February 1883 – 27 November 1949) was an English stage and film actor, producer and director, best known for presenting and co-starring in the Aldwych farces in the 1920s and for starring in and directing the film adaptations of those plays in the 1930s.

Walls spent his early years as an actor, from 1905, mostly in musical comedy, touring the British provinces, North America and Australia and in the West End. He specialised in comic character roles, typically flirtatious middle aged men. In 1922 he went into management in partnership with the comic actor Leslie Henson. They had an early success in the West End with a long-running farce, Tons of Money, after which Walls commissioned and staged a series of farces at the Aldwych Theatre that ran almost continuously over the next decade. He and his co-star Ralph Lynn were among the most popular British actors of their time.

In addition to his work in the theatre, Walls directed and acted in more than forty films between 1930 and 1949. Some of these were screen versions of the successful stage plays, others were specially-written comedies on similar lines, and there were also serious films, particularly later in Walls's career.

Away from acting, Walls's passion was horse racing. He set up stables at his home in Surrey and trained about 150 winners, including April the Fifth, his 1932 Derby winner.

== Life and career ==
=== Early years ===
Walls was born in Kingsthorpe, Northampton, the son of John William Walls, a plumber and builder, and his wife, Ellen, née Brewer. He was educated at Northampton County School, after which he tried a variety of jobs, working in Canada for a year and, on his return, joining the Metropolitan Police.

In 1905 Walls embarked on a stage career. His first engagement was as member of a seafront Pierrot troupe in Brighton. He played in pantomime in Aladdin at Glasgow in the 1905–06 season, under the management of Robert Courtneidge. He performed in a concert party and in musical comedy, touring the British provinces and North America as the Jester in The Scarlet Mysteries. In 1907 he made his West End debut, playing Ensign Ruffler in Sir Roger de Coverley at the Empire, Leicester Square.

Walls appeared in Edwardian musical comedies in the West End and on tour from 1908 to 1921. In February 1910 he married Alice Hilda Edwards, an actress on the musical comedy stage. They had one son, Tom Kenneth Walls. During 1910–11, Walls toured in Australia, playing Peter Doody in The Arcadians, Mr. Hook in Miss Hook of Holland, and the Marquis de St. Gautier in The Belle of Brittany.

Back in London, Walls had substantial roles in The Sunshine Girl (1912); The Marriage Market (1913) and A Country Girl (1915). Later in 1915 he played Coquenard in a revival of Messager's Veronique; between then and 1921 he appeared in nine other musical comedies and a pantomime. His best known show of these years was probably Kissing Time (1919), in which he played Colonel Bolinger opposite Leslie Henson. His biographer, Sean Fielding, writes, "His forte was the portrayal of amiable philanderers or eccentric older gentlemen, usually with a forceful, even hectoring manner."

=== Actor manager ===
A Cuckoo in the Nest, 1925: Walls, left, with Ralph Lynn, Yvonne Arnaud, Hastings Lynn and Madge Saunders

Walls went into partnership with Henson and became managing director of Tom Walls and Leslie Henson, Ltd, controlling several touring companies. In 1922 the partnership presented the farce Tons of Money at the Shaftesbury Theatre. It was a great popular success, running for nearly two years. Walls played a supporting role in the piece and cast Ralph Lynn in the leading part, propelling Lynn to stardom. Walls took a lease of the Aldwych Theatre, where he and Henson presented another farce, It Pays to Advertise, which ran for nearly 600 performances. To replace the piece, Walls acquired the rights to another farce, A Cuckoo in the Nest by Ben Travers.

Walls and Lynn co-starred in the Aldwych productions, and Travers was careful to maintain the equilibrium of their stage partnership by ensuring that each had as many funny lines as the other. Initially, Travers found Walls difficult as an actor-manager, and also distressingly unprepared as an actor. But even Walls's calls to the stage manager for lines became a popular part of opening nights at the Aldwych.

There were twelve Aldwych farces under Walls's management. The first eight averaged runs of 369 performances. The last four did less well, averaging under 150 performances. Walls gathered a regular troupe of supporting actors, including Robertson Hare, Mary Brough and Winifred Shotter. Travers wrote for these players, drawing on their strengths, his plays populated by:

the horsy, cunning Tom Walls; the silly ass Ralph Lynn, always dropping his monocle; the bald, clerkish, respectable Robertson Hare always liable at some point in the play to have his trousers removed for perfectly logical reasons; the slim, pretty Winifred Shotter, equally liable to dash across the stage in her underclothes; and Mary Brough, the gruff, suspicious landlady.

In 1935 Tom Walls was the prominent name showing on a hoarding in Knightsbridge for Lady In Danger at the Yvonne Arnaud Theatre

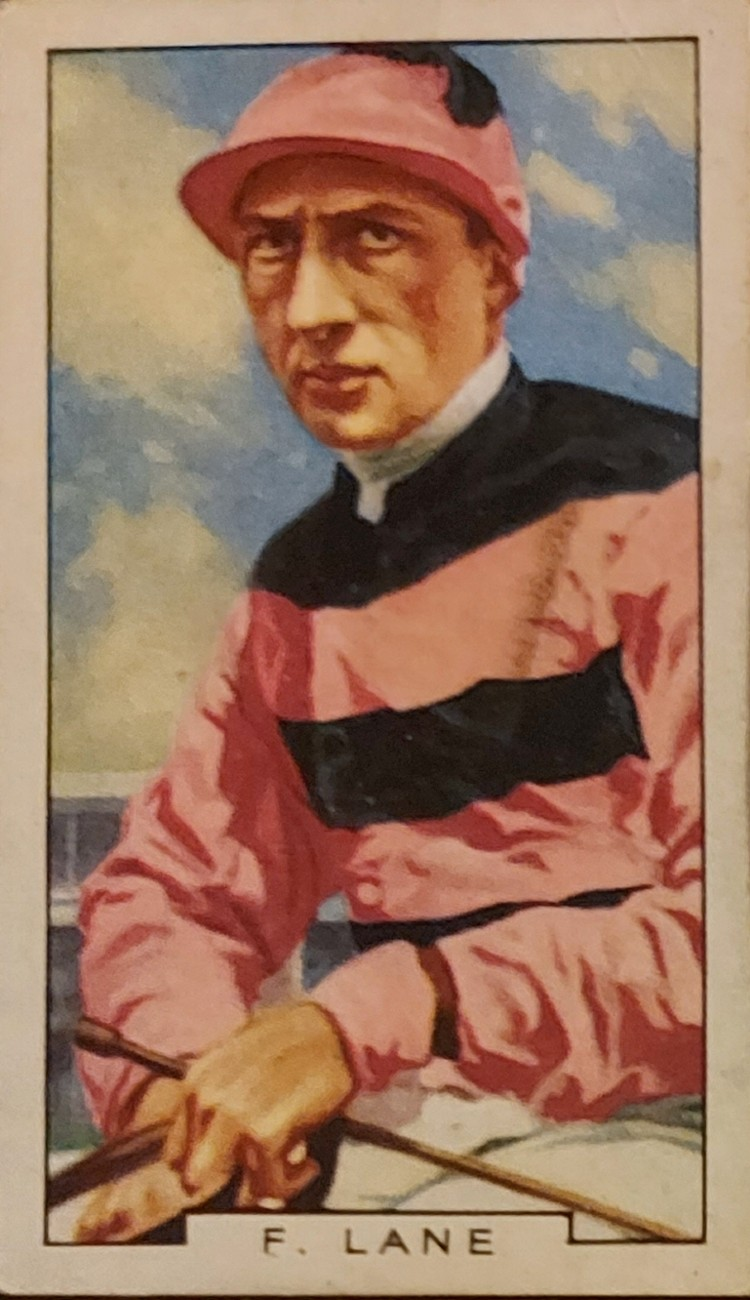
Fred Lane, April the Fifth's jockey, in Walls' racing colours from a 1936 cigarette card

=== Later career ===
Walls made an early foray into films in 1924 in a silent screen version of Tons of Money, though he did not reprise his stage role. When the talkies arrived, Walls moved his focus away from the theatre and into cinema. He directed seventeen films between 1930 and 1938, acting in most of them. He directed his last, Old Iron, at the end of the 1930s. In the 1930s, Walls and Lynn regularly appeared in the lists of the top ten British film stars. Walls usually outranked Lynn in the top ratings, because, in the words of the critic Jeffrey Richards, "everyone warmed to the old reprobate whereas the 'silly ass' was not to everyone's taste."

Walls left Herbert Wilcox in the 1930s to be signed by Michael Balcon at Gaumont. He was given a strong contract, including the right of story and cast approval and the freedom to direct if he wished. Balcon later wrote "Walls and I were not great friends. In fact at that time I disliked him fiercely, and perhaps somewhat unreasonably. Every detailed point that arose out of the contract I contested and to every interview with me Tom Walls brought his lawyer...Our major disputes arose from casting problems, as Tom’s choices were not always made on acting ability."

Balcon also claimed "Tom was basically a first-rate performer but, frankly, he did not understand films in any technical or creative sense and would not accept this fact because of his many successes in the early days of sound films." The producer felt that "first-class films could have emerged if only he placed himself in the hands of a competent director instead of believing he could do everything himself."

Walls continued to act on screen in both comedies and dramas until his death, often playing character roles in other directors' films. In 1943 he appeared in the serious film Undercover as the father of a guerrilla leader in Yugoslavia. His final film was The Interrupted Journey (1949).

In his private life Walls's great passion was flat racing. In 1927 he established a stable at his home in Ewell, Surrey, with up to twenty-five horses at any one time. Over the next twenty years his horses won about 150 races, including the 1932 Derby won by his April the Fifth. The expense of the stables, together with a generally lavish lifestyle, was a severe drain on Walls's finances.

In 1939 Walls took over the Alexandra Theatre in the London suburb Stoke Newington, which he ran as a repertory theatre. On tour and then at the Shaftesbury Theatre he produced and acted in a farce by Wilfred Eyre, His Majesty's Guest (1939). He toured in Springtime for Henry (1940), of which The Manchester Guardian commented, "Mr. Tom Walls is, of course, outstanding. Deliciously amusing, with a masterly attention to detail, his progress from sin to virtue and back again is a delight to watch". The following year he toured in Frederick Lonsdale's Canaries Sometimes Sing, and in 1942 presented and starred in another farce, Why Not To-Night? on tour and then at the Ambassadors in London.

His last stage appearance was in 1948, in a revival of The Barretts of Wimpole Street, in which his performance as the tyrannical Edward Moulton-Barrett was thought to lack menace.

Walls died at his home in Ewell, Surrey in 1949, at the age of 66. His ashes were scattered on Epsom racecourse.

== Filmography ==
=== Actor ===
- Rookery Nook (1930) - Clive Popkiss
- On Approval (1930) - Duke of Bristol
- Canaries Sometimes Sing (1930) - Geoffrey Lymes
- Plunder (1931) - Freddie Malone
- A Night Like This (1932) - Michael Mahoney
- Thark (1932) - Sir Hector Benbow
- Leap Year (1932) - Sir Peter Traillon
- The Blarney Stone (1933) - Tim Fitzgerald
- Leave It to Smith (1933) - Smith
- A Cuckoo in the Nest (1933) - Maj. Bone
- Turkey Time (1933) - Max Wheeler
- A Cup of Kindness (1934) - Fred Tutt
- Lady in Danger (1934) - Richard Dexter
- Fighting Stock (1935) - Brig. Gen. Sir Donald Rowley
- Me and Marlborough (1935) - John Churchill - Duke of Marlborough
- Stormy Weather (1935) - Sir Duncan Craggs
- Foreign Affaires (1935) - Capt. the Hon. Archibald Gore
- Pot Luck (1936) - Inspector Fitzpatrick
- Dishonour Bright (1936) - Stephen Champion
- For Valour (1937) - Doubleday / Charlie Chisholm
- Second Best Bed (1938) - Victor Garnett
- Strange Boarders (1938) - Tommy Blythe
- Crackerjack (1938) - Jack Drake
- Old Iron (1938) - Sir Henry Woodstock
- Undercover (1943) - Kossan Petrovitch
- They Met in the Dark (1943) - Christopher Child
- The Halfway House (1944) - Capt. Meadows
- Love Story (1944) - Tom Tanner
- Johnny Frenchman (1945) - Nat Pomeroy
- This Man Is Mine (1946) - Philip Ferguson
- Master of Bankdam (1947) - Simeon Crowther Sr.
- While I Live (1947) - Nehemiah
- Spring in Park Lane (1948) - Uncle Joshua
- Maytime in Mayfair (1949) - Inspector
- The Interrupted Journey (1949) - Clayton (final film role)

=== Director ===
- Tons of Money (1930)
- Rookery Nook (1930)
- On Approval (1930)
- Plunder (1931)
- A Night Like This (1932)
- Thark (1932)
- A Cuckoo in the Nest (1933)
- Turkey Time (1933)
- A Cup of Kindness (1934)
- Lady in Danger (1934)
- Dirty Work (1934)
