= Vaib Solomon =

Australian humorous writer and businessman (1897–1982)

Vaiben Louis Solomon (31 May 1897 – 1982), commonly called "Vaib" to distinguish him from his father and others of the same name, was a businessman, better known as the humorous writer "Vaiben Louis".

== History ==
Solomon was born in Medindie, South Australia, the only son of politician Vaiben Louis Solomon (1853–1908) and his second wife Alice née Cohen (died 19 May 1954).

He was educated at St Peter's College then at Wesley College, when his parents moved to Melbourne. He wrote humorous pieces for a school magazine The Lion, which he sub-edited, and was active in amateur theatricals raising money for patriotic causes during the Great War. He was successful in business, but continued to write, notably short humorous verses which were regularly published in Smith's Weekly 1922–1923.

He wrote a sketch for the comedian Gene Gerrard, which drew the attention of Hugh J. Ward, who had just acquired the rights to the "hit" farce Tons of Money and commissioned Solomon to write the lyrics of a musical version to a score by Willy Redstone. It had a successful run at Sydney's Grand Opera House 1 March – 23 May 1924 and Melbourne's Princess Theatre 10–30 November 1924 with Charles Heslop and Dot Brunton as Aubrey and Louise Allington.

He appears to have then ceased writing, and apart from his marriage in 1931, dropped out of the limelight completely.

== Family ==
Solomon married Claribelle "Claire" Mitchell of Camberwell, Victoria on 31 March 1931.
