= Willy Redstone =

French composer and conductor

Willy (or Willie) Redstone (24 September 1883 – 30 September 1949) was a French composer and conductor of light music who had a substantial career in England and Australia, where he became music editor for the ABC.

== History ==
Redstone (originally Rottenstein) was born in Paris, a nephew of the composer Charles Gounod (his mother was a half-sister). and cousin of Albert Carré, director of the Paris Opéra-Comique. His parents were in Paris as refugees from Strasbourg, which had fallen to Germany in 1870.

He trained in Paris to be an engineer, but was more interested in music. He was four years at the Paris Conservatoire, on a scholarship won through his talent as a pianist. He studied harmony and counterpoint under Massenet. His first composition, at the age of 20, was a light opera which ran at the Théâtre des Arts for thirty weeks in 1905, setting his future as a writer of light music.

He was also in demand by theatre directors in Paris and London as a conductor, arranger and orchestrator. For Georges Gabriel Thenon he wrote the revue À perte de revue (1906), staged at the Théâtre du Palais-Royal starring Paul Ardot, the operetta Le Trou d'Almanzor (1907) at the Théâtre des Arts. He was commissioned to write a three-act burlesque on Edmond Rostand's Chantecler, named Mik 1^{ier}, with libretto by Charles-Alexis Carpentier (died 1929), published in 1911.

=== England ===
Redstone wrote some music for the Tiller Girls, who were at the time performing in Paris. This led to an invitation by John Tiller to visit his dance school in Manchester, and incidentally married one of his star performers. In 1907 he conducted a Christmas pantomime in Leeds, and later was associated with George Grossmith and George Edwardes at the London Gaiety, writing scores for musical comedies and revues. He wrote the revue Everybody's Doing It which was produced at the Hackney Empire. He worked as musical adviser for André Charlot at the Alhambra Theatre, writing the revues Eight pence a Mile and Keep Smiling with Lee White.

He composed the operetta Les Petits Crevés for Thenon, staged in 1913 at the Théâtre des Capucines, starring Jacques Bousquet. Songs published around this time include Lucy (1913) and Arabella (1914), both with lyrics by Pierre Chapelle. He contributed to Reynaldo Hahn's operetta Miousic, libretto by Paul Ferrier, staged in 1914 at the Paris Olympia. He composed the operetta Berlingot with A. Stanislas for Lucien Boyer, staged in 1920 at the Concert Mayol.

At the outbreak of WWI he was in Paris, fulfilling a commitment to write three musical comedies, In August 1914 he joined the French army, but was back at the Alhambra a year later, having been discharged in December as disabled, following an accident during the retreat from Belgium, which had far-reaching consequences for his newborn son George — with the outbreak of WWII he was posted as a deserter and papers served for his extradition despite only living in the country for few months as a baby, and not speaking a word of French.

When Charlot left the Alhambra, Redstone found employment with Grossmith and Laurillard, conducting To-Night's the Night, Theodore and Co, and Yes, Uncle!. and it may have been around this time that he was associated with concert and stage personalities Leslie Henson, Tom Walls, Alice Delysia, Mistinguett, Maurice Chevalier and Charles CCochran. Songs composed around this time include Marche des gavroches (March of the Ragamuffins, 1916) with words by L. Boyn and Pierre Forgettes. It was during the run of Yes, Uncle! that he was recalled to the French army to act as an Agent, and interpreter with the American forces. Two years later he was back with Grossmlth and Laurillard to conduct Kissing Time at the Winter Garden. He was then commissioned to write the music for A Night Out. He was for a time at Daly's Theatre with The Maid of the Mountains starring José Collins, and later toured with that production.

Redstone wrote a song Were You the Only Girl in the World, which he sold to London publisher Bert Feldman for £5 (some references say five guineas — £5/5s.), thereupon losing all rights to his composition. Nat D. Ayer took the song, changed the verses, and as If You Were the Only Girl (In the World) it was used in the revue The Bing Boys on Broadway and became a "hit".

=== Australia ===
In 1922 he was appointed musical director for Hugh J. Ward, who was about to tour Australia with The O'Brien Girl, starting with his new Princess Theatre, Melbourne, which ran for 202 performances, and Tangerine for 101. Ward had purchased the rights to the play Tons of Money, which fared poorly in Melbourne, but recast as a musical with numbers by Redstone to lyrics by Vaib Solomon it was well received and had long seasons there and in Sydney's Grand Opera House.

His next project as musical director was No, No, Nanette, the first musical he conducted for which he did not contribute any original work. This was followed by Lady Be Good in 1927.

In 1928 he was called on by James Cassius Williamson to take charge of the first symphony concert to be broadcast in Australia.

He joined the ABC in 1932, and in 1938 was appointed its Federal Musical Editor; it was said he could write out a fresh arrangement for full symphony orchestra as swiftly as most people write a letter. He exercised this facility for the Sydney Symphony Orchestra.

Redstone, Lindley Evans and Alfred Hill composed the score for Charles Chauvel's 1940 film Forty Thousand Horsemen. and was also involved in Chauvel's Rats of Tobruk (1944) alongside Lindley Evans and Charles Mackerras. He also composed the score for Lee Robinson's 1949 documentary Crocodile Hunters, commissioned by the Department of Information. Perhaps his most famous work in this period was an arrangement of John Brown's Body.

He retained his youthful interest in engineering, and had an expert knowledge of aeronautics.

He died in Sydney after a short illness, and his remains were cremated. His last completed work was The Sphinx, a ballet suite for orchestra. He was currently engaged on a musical "Life of Christ" with one Oscar Walters.

== Family ==
Willy Redstone was born Charles Willy Adolphe Rottenstein in Paris on 24 September 1883, a son of Johann Baptist (or Jean Baptiste) Rottenstein and Jeanne Marie Marguerite Baretty. Redstone married Florence Annie Osborne, an accomplished dancer and comedienne, in Paris on 23 July 1914. Though known as Redstone, the surname Rottenstein was not relinquished.

- George John Frederick Redstone (born in France 23 June 1914) married June Lorraine Johnson in 1940. His arrangement of Advance Australia Fair was recorded by the Sydney Symphony Orchestra, conductor Henry Krips on 4 May 1968.
- Laurette Jeanne Redstone married Thomas John Collins (born Deniliquin 21 May 1925)
- Wesley Redstone (born in Melbourne 12 June 1923),
- Tony Redstone
- Jacqueline Redstone

They had a home at Pacific Street, Watsons Bay, later at 21 Fairweather Street, Bellevue Hill.

== See also ==
"Oevres de Willie Redstone". BnF. 35 works listed 1908–1921
