= Gertrude Sans Souci =

- Gertrude Sans Souci, c. 1894. From Laudon, Robert Tallant. (2003) Gertrude Sans Souci (1873–1913) and her Milieu: Building a Musical Career Retrieved from the University of Minnesota Digital Conservancy, https://hdl.handle.net/11299/44896. Used by permission of the Minnesota Historical Society.

Background information
- Born: Gertrude Sansouci; October 23, 1872; Putnam, Connecticut, US
- Died: January 19, 1913 (aged 39) Weehawken, New Jersey, US
- Genres: Art Song
- Occupations: Composer, Organist, Pianist

Gertrude Sans Souci (October 23, 1872 – January 19, 1913) was an American organist, pianist and song composer. After study in Germany, she developed a national career as a keyboard performer in the US and published some two dozen songs.

== Biography ==
=== Early years and musical education ===
Born 23 October 1872 in Putnam, Connecticut to John and Maggie Sansouci. (Some sources give 1873.) Her father was a shoemaker with French-Canadian heritage. Her mother was of Irish descent. They shared a Roman Catholic faith. In his biography of the composer, Laudon explains the origin of her colorful, but authentic surname. "The French name Carefree—Sans (without), Souci (care)—already promised a sparkling personality. The actual family name was Vel but in the eighteenth century back in Canada, free spirits acquired the nickname Carefree, an appellation soon adopted by the family" and pronounced San-sou'-see.

The Sansouci's moved to Saint Paul, Minnesota in 1877. Gertrude studied at St. Joseph’s Academy, run by the Sisters of St. Joseph of Carondelet. Her piano teachers included Charles Groves Titcomb (the teacher of Carrie Jacobs-Bond), Ella Richards and Emma Hess Detzer.

From 1890 to 1893 Gertrude and her sister Monica studied in Berlin, accompanied by their mother. Gertrude’s teachers included the organist Pyllemann and the eminent virtuoso Moritz Moszkowski. Her study with Moszkowski lasted a full year, and he praised her “interest, intelligence and controlled diligence” in his letter of recommendation. She also received coaching from Liszt’s pupil Moriz Rosenthal.

=== Professional career ===
Gertrude began to build a career immediately upon her return to Minnesota in 1893. She modified her professional name to Sans Souci, recalling Frederick the Great's palace near Berlin. Her aspirations are clear in her brochure of 1894–95, where she is billed as a “Concert Pianiste.” She gave her debut at Ford Music Hall in Saint Paul on 2 June 1893. She was appointed organist at St. Luke’s Catholic Church, a position she held 1893–97. In 1898 she became organist at the Cathedral of Saint Paul. Her last position in the Twin Cities was the most lucrative in the region, according to Laudon: organist at Wesley Methodist Church in Minneapolis.

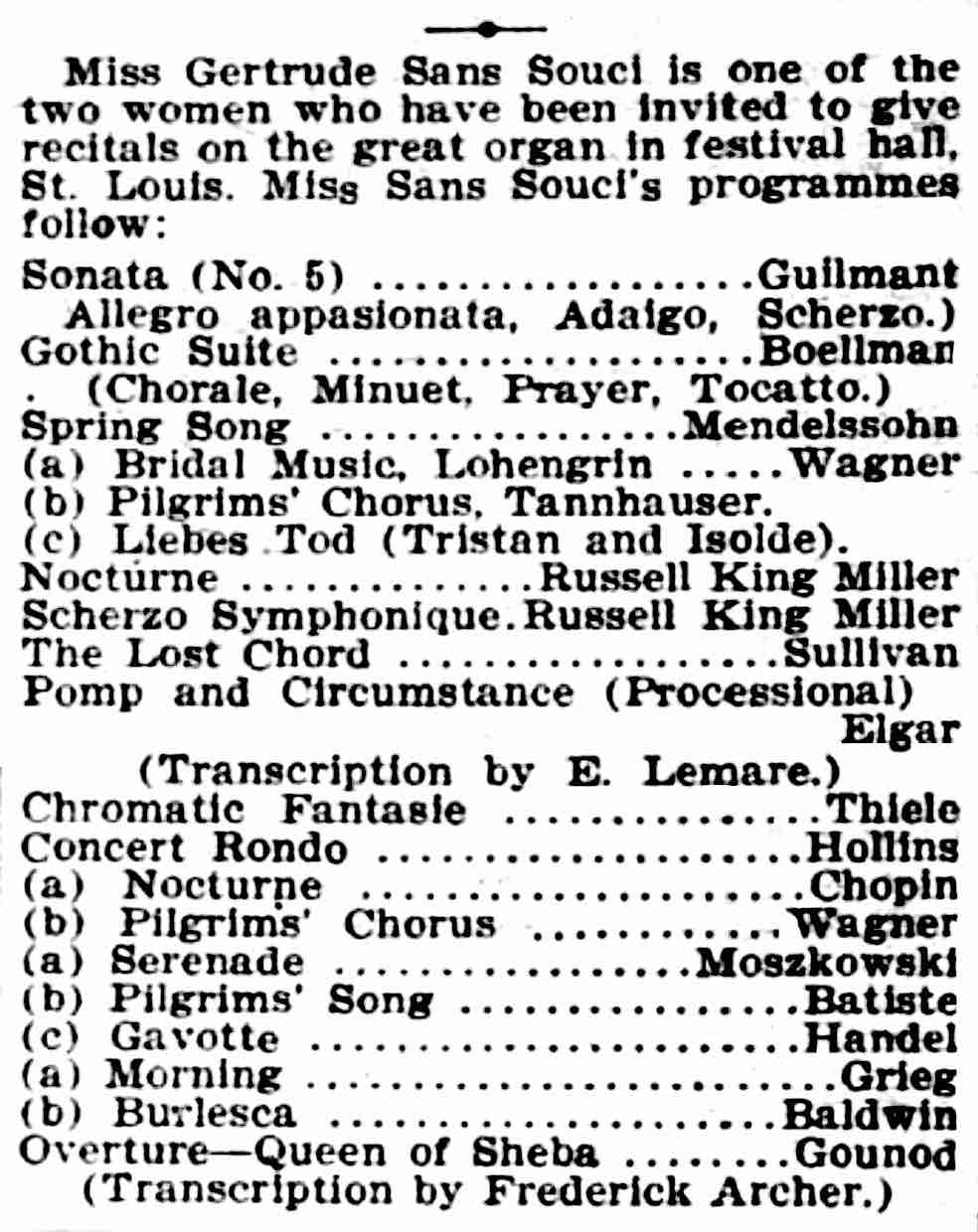
Sans Souci's programs for the Louisiana Exhibition, St. Paul Globe, 21 August 1904

Sans Souci performed at two great American assemblies of the early twentieth century. In 1901 she appeared at the Pan-American Exposition in Buffalo, New York. Her organ recitals on 12 and 13 September took place in the Temple of Music, the very building where President William McKinley had been shot on 5 September. “At the height of the tragedy,” writes Laudon, “Gertrude Sans Souci mounted the dais to play two organ recitals at the great exposition.” McKinley died on 13 September 1901. In 1904 Sans Souci appeared at the Louisiana Purchase Exhibition, the St. Louis World’s Fair celebrating the centennial of the Louisiana Purchase. The organ constructed for that assembly was the largest in the world to date. It would later be further expanded and installed in Wanamaker's Department Store in Philadelphia.

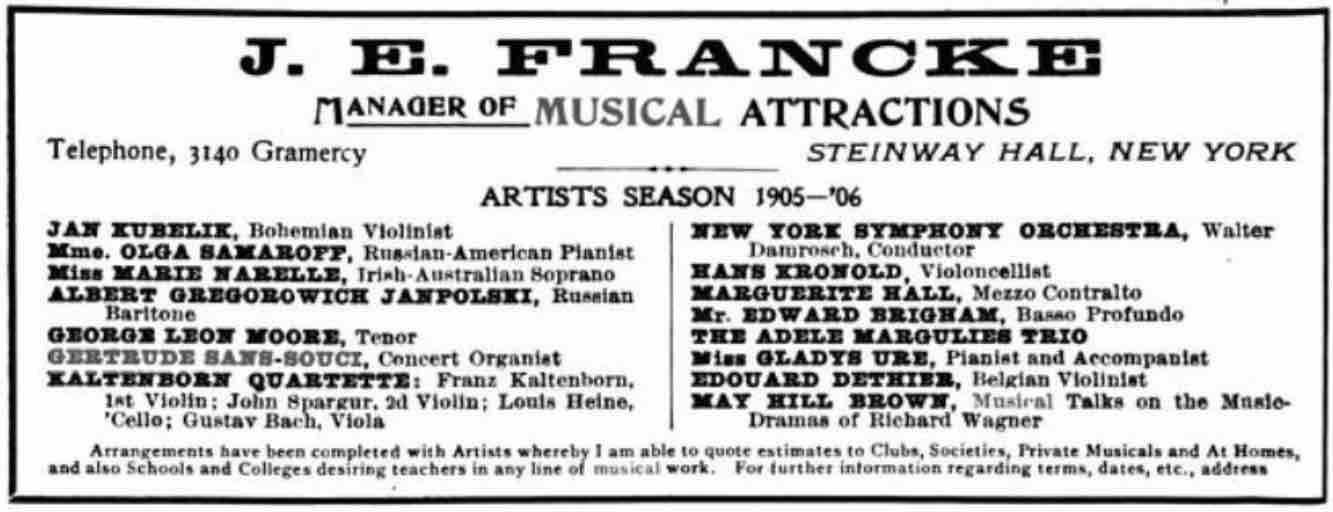
Gertrude Sans Souci under management by J.E. Francke

Sans Souci joined the roster of concert artists represented by the New York manager J. E. Franke for the 1905–06 season. As a teacher, she served on the organ and piano faculties of the Johnson School of Music and the Northwestern Conservatory of Music in Minneapolis, an institution which boasted among its teachers Emile Oberhoffer, founder of the Minneapolis Symphony. And she began to write about music for The Musical Courier and The Ladies Home Journal.

=== Published composer ===
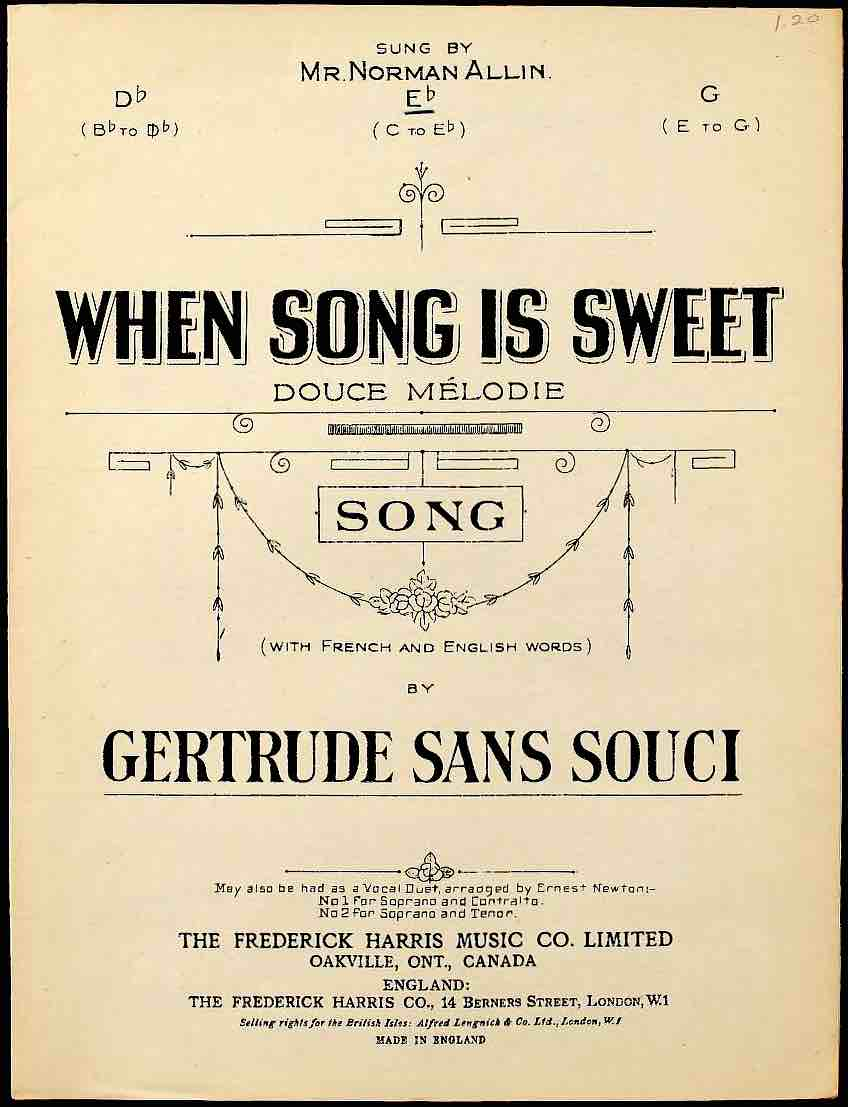
Cover of Sans Souci's "When Song is Sweet," published 1902

Sans Souci began publishing songs in 1901. She scored a hit with her very first: “When Song is Sweet” (1902), one of three songs published by the reputable Boston publisher Oliver Ditson. The song sold over 100,000 copies within a decade. The Minneapolis firm Paul A. Schmitt published thirteen Sans Souci titles. William Maxwell Music Co. published “Twilight Shadows” in New York in 1905.

Sans Souci moved to New York City in 1906 and, after her marriage the following year, set up her own business under her married name: G. S. Toomey. Publishers reprinted her songs abroad. Frederick Harris Co. of London reprinted “When Song is Sweet.” The august Italian house G. Ricordi published “Awake little Flower” in 1911. Several songs were reprinted in Australia.

Sans Souci’s songs were sung by contralto Mary Louise Clary; Victor recording artist Frank Croxton; British bass Norman Allin (who recorded “When Song is Sweet” for Edison Records); Canadian tenor Paul Dufault; and French soprano Claire Gooley. She figured in the repertoires of Australian singers Freyda Gilder and Essie Ackland. More recently, tenors Ian Partridge and Robert Tear have recorded “When Song is Sweet.” Sans Souci is mentioned in the revised edition of Woman’s Work in Music by Arthur Elson, one of the first works devoted to women in music.

=== Personal life ===
Gertrude Sans Souci married William Charles Toomey on August 7, 1907, in Manhattan. A daughter, Ruth, was born in 1910. Sans Souci died on January 19, 1913, in Weehawken, New Jersey. The cause of death is not clear. The Musical Courier attributed it to “ptomaine poisoning” leading to “blood poisoning.” The Minneapolis Morning Tribune cited heart failure and suggested: "friends believe that it was due to rheumatic trouble and a nervous breakdown from which she had been suffering recently." Gertrude Sans Souci is buried in the Cemetery of the Holy Name in Jersey City, New Jersey.

=== "Writing for the singing public" ===
Sans Souci was born in the same year as Alexander Scriabin and two years before Charles Ives. But she did not compare herself to those composers, saying: “I do not attempt ambitious things, but confine myself to writing for the singing public which likes melody rather than theoretical problems in composition.”

== Sources ==
- Elson Arthur & Everett Truett, Woman’s Work in Music (1903), new revised edition, Boston: L. C. Page & Co., 1931. View at Archive.org
- Finn, Jacquelie Lessard, From Habitants to Immigrants: The Sansoucys, the Harpins, and the Potvins, Lulu, 2017.
- Laudon, Robert Tallant, Gertrude Sans Souci and her Milieu: Building a Musical Career, University of Minnesota Libraries Digital Conservancy, 2003.
- Mathieu, Jane, “Midtown, 1906: The Case for an Alternative Tin Pan Alley” American Music, University of Illinois Press: Vol. 35, No. 2, Summer 2017, pp. 197–236.
- Simmons, Kenneth F., “The Organ In The Temple Of Music, Buffalo, N.Y.,” The Tracker, Journal of the Organ Historical Society, Vol. 14, No. 2, Winter 1970, pp. 8–9.
