= Charles Heslop =

British actor (1883–1966)

- Born: 8 June 1883; Thames Ditton, Surrey, England
- Died: 13 April 1966 (aged 82); London, England
- Occupation: Actor

Charles Heslop (8 June 1883 in Thames Ditton, England – 13 April 1966) was a British actor.

His stage successes include a musical version of Tons of Money, which toured Australia for Hugh J. Ward in 1924, co-starring Dot Brunton.

He starred in the BBC television comedy Percy Ponsonby as a talkative barber. The series was broadcast in 1939, and was cancelled with the outbreak of the Second World War.

In 1954 he appeared in William Douglas Home's The Manor of Northstead in the West End. In 1960 he appeared in the comedy thriller play Settled Out of Court. Two years later he featured at Wyndham's Theatre in Arthur Watkyn's Out of Bounds.

== Filmography ==
- Hobson's Choice (1920)
- This Is the Life (1933)
- Waltzes from Vienna (1934)
- Charing Cross Road (1935)
- Crackerjack (1938)
- The Lambeth Walk (1939)
- Percy Ponsonby (1939)
- Flying Fortress (1942)
- The Peterville Diamond (1943)
- The Second Mate (1950)
- Don't Say Die (1950)
- The Late Edwina Black (1951)
- Nothing Barred (1961)
- A Pair of Briefs (1962)
