= Fred Evans (comedian) =

British music hall and silent film comedian

- Born: Frederick William Evans; 20 February 1889; Lambeth, London, England
- Died: 31 August 1951 (aged 62); St Germans, Cornwall, England
- Occupation: Comedian
- Years active: 1890s–1951
- Known for: Music hall, silent films

Frederick William Evans (20 February 1889 – 31 August 1951) was a British music hall and silent film comedian, who became famous around the time of the First World War for portraying his character Pimple in more than 200 short movies. He was described as "second only in popularity to Chaplin in Britain at the height of his career," and as displaying "a proto-Pythonesque humour of the absurd." Critic Barry Anthony wrote that "in many ways the topical skits of Pimple have more in common with The Crazy Gang, Benny Hill, the Goons, Monty Python or topical sketch shows like French and Saunders and The Fast Show than with the classic Hollywood silent comedies."

== Biography ==
Evans was born in London into a family of music hall and circus performers. His grandfather, also named Fred Evans, was a popular clown who staged harlequinades; his uncle Will Evans was a leading music hall comedian; and his parents were members of several touring musical troupes. He was a childhood friend of Charlie Chaplin. As a child he performed with his brother Joe as part of his parents' pantomime act, the Florador Quartet. Fred and Joe then worked together and individually in music hall, and for Sanger's Circus, before joining filmmakers Cricks and Martin in 1910. Evans' early screen appearances were as Charley Smiler, a disaster-prone 'dude' character dressed in frock coat, waistcoat and spats.

In 1912, Fred and Joe Evans began working at the Ec-Ko studios in Teddington, and set up their own production company, Folly Films. Unable to use the Charley Smiler character because of legal threats from Cricks and Martin, Evans devised a new character, Pimple, an accident-prone clown with a tight jacket, baggy pants, big boots, cricket cap, and lank strands of hair around a central parting. The films were scripted by Joe Evans. Early films were often chases; in Pimple and the Snake (1912), Pimple tries to retrieve a snake that has escaped from the zoo, but instead chases a lady's feather boa, causing chaos. By 1913, the comedies were increasingly spoofs of popular films, plays and novels. For example, a series of Lieutenant Pimple films poked fun at the screen exploits of the swashbuckling Lieutenant Daring, hero of more serious melodramas. Pimple's Battle of Waterloo (1913) was a merciless parody of the recent epic film The Battle of Waterloo, which had been characterised by location filming and (for the period) lavish production values. Pimple's version made a virtue of its low-budget filming in the backyard of their premises at Eel Pie Island to ridicule the earlier production. In Pimple in 'The Whip' (1917), another parody, the Evans brothers used pantomime horses and a man wearing a horse head and carrying a stick in each hand to represent the front legs, to re-enact the original movie's thrilling race scenes. The films also made use of jokey and punning intertitles.

The films were extremely successful in Britain, and by 1915 the Evans brothers were producing some six titles each month, most of which are now lost. Evans promoted the films by travelling around the country to present them, sometimes also performing a live act as part of a mixed programme. He also toured as part of an Army campaign to promote and raise funds for servicemen fighting the war, but in 1916 received a medical discharge from the forces. He continued to make films but his popularity declined. He returned to performing in the music halls, and had his performances filmed, but was declared bankrupt in 1920. His last films were made in 1922.

Evans later appeared in revues with his wife and daughters, and worked as a film extra in the 1930s, eventually reuniting with his brother Joe – who had worked in the United States – to present a puppet show in the Second World War. He died in 1951 after performing in a circus.

== Selected filmography ==
- Charley Smiler Joins the Boy Scouts (1911)
- Pimple and the Snake (1912)
- Pimple's Wonderful Gramaphone (1913)
- Pimple's New Job (1913)
- Pimple's Motor Bike (1913)
- Pimple's Complaint (1913)
- Pimple's Battle of Waterloo (1913)
- How Pimple Saved Kissing Cup (1913)
- Making A Living (1914)
- W.H.O.R.K. a la Pimple (1914)
- Pimple's Charge of the Light Brigade (1914)
- Lieutenant Pimple's Dash for the Pole (1914)
- Lieut. Pimple and the Stolen Submarine (1914)
- Pimple's Uncle (1915)
- Pimple Has One (1915)
- Mrs. Raffles Née Pimple (1915)
- Pimple's Pink Forms (1916)
- Pimple's Part (1916)
- Pimple in 'The Whip' (1917)
- Pimple's Topical Gazette (1920)
- Pimple's Three Musketeers (1922)
