= Don't Say Die =

1950 British film by Vivian Milroy

- Directed by: Vivian Milroy
- Written by: Dido Milroy; Vivian Milroy; Desmond Walter-Ellis
- Produced by: Louis Hagen; Margot Lovell; Vivian Milroy
- Starring: Charles Heslop; Sandra Dorne; Constance Smith
- Cinematography: James Wilson
- Edited by: Ken Bilton
- Music by: Raymond Bennell
- Production company: X Productions
- Distributed by: Independent Film Distributors
- Release date: 1950
- Running time: 72 minutes
- Country: United Kingdom
- Language: English

Don't Say Die is a 1950 British comedy film directed by Vivian Milroy and starring Charles Heslop, Sandra Dorne and Constance Smith. It is also known by the alternative title of Never Say Die.

== Cast ==
- Charles Heslop as Charles Choosey
- Sandra Dorne as Sandra
- Desmond Walter-Ellis as The Hon. Bertie Blarney
- Constance Smith as Red Biddy
- Tony Quinn as Mike Murphy
- Stanley Rose as Gus
- Derek Tansley as Potts
- Thomas Gallagher as Gorilla
- Raymond Rollett as Ticket Inspector
- Michael Raghan as Station Master
- Kenneth Connor as Pat O'Neill
- Harry Lane as McClusky
- Denis McCarthy as O'Toole

== Bibliography ==
- David Quinlan. Quinlan's Illustrated Directory of Film Comedy Stars. Batsford, 1992.
