= Percy Ponsonby =

BBC television comedy series

Percy Ponsonby is a BBC television comedy series broadcast in 1939. It starred Charles Heslop as a "talkative barber", an actor who was poised to become "England's first television comedy star" until the outbreak of the Second World War interrupted his career. (Note: The BBC ceased television broadcasts on 1 September 1939, the day that Nazi Germany invaded Poland, and did not resume until 7 June 1946.)
