= Will Evans (comedian) =

English actor, comedian and playwright (1866–1931)

- Evans in 1912
- Born: William Edward Evans; 29 May 1866; London, England
- Died: 11 April 1931 (aged 64); London, England
- Occupations: Comedian, actor, playwright
- Years active: 1881–1931

William Edward Evans (29 May 1866 – 11 April 1931) was an English actor, comedian and playwright. He was well known as a performer in music halls and silent comedy films, and appeared in West End musical shows. As a writer his biggest success was the farce Tons of Money which opened in 1922 and ran for more than 700 performances.

== Life and career ==
Evans was born in London in 1866, (Note: In his Who's Who in the Theatre entry Evans gave his year of birth as 1873, following a well-established tradition among performers of deducting a few years from their age but official records show the correct year as 1866.) the son of Frederick William Evans, a well-known clown and acrobat. Will's older brother, Fred Evans, was the father of the popular comedian of the First World War era, also named Fred Evans.

Will Evans made his first appearance on the stage at the Theatre Royal, Drury Lane on 26 December 1881, as an animal impersonator in the pantomime Robinson Crusoe, also appearing with his father in the harlequinade of the show. For several years he toured with his father's pantomime troupe, and was part of a musical trio with his brother Fred. He returned to the London stage in March 1890, and appeared with his first wife, Ada Luxmore, as Evans and Luxmore, in an eccentric musical turn, at most of the principal London music halls. After his wife's death in 1897, he continued to perform as a solo comedian, specialising in farcical domestic sketches such as "Building a Chicken House", "Whitewashing the Ceiling", and "Papering a House", often with a straight man, Arthur Conquest. He appeared in burlesque sketches of his own devising in venues throughout the United Kingdom, and in the United States, Russia, Italy, France, Poland, the Netherlands and Germany.

From 1899, he made short silent comic films, such as The Music Eccentric in which he performed acrobatics, tumbling out of and back into the frame. He also made films of his most popular stage sketches. In 1914, he founded the Sunny South and Sealight Film Company in Shoreham-by-Sea, Sussex, and worked with Conquest and designer F. L. Lyndhurst on re-makes of his earlier films as well as new films, including The Showman's Dream (1914).

He appeared in the annual Drury Lane pantomime for ten years from 1910 to 1919, as a pantomime dame. He was in several West End musical shows: After the Girl (1914), Half-past Eight (1916) and We're All In It (1916). He went on a tour of Australian variety theatres in 1923–24; on returning to England he toured in The Other Mr. Gibbs (1924) of which he was co-author with R. Guy Reeve. His most successful show as a writer was Tons of Money (1922), co-written with Valentine, which ran for 737 performances in London, and was filmed in 1924 and again in 1930.

Evans's last stage appearance in London was at the Scala, where he played in Cinderella. He gave several broadcast performances. He died at his home in London on 11 April 1931, aged 64.

== Sources ==
- Mander, Raymond; Joe Mitchenson (1965). British Music Hall: A Story in Pictures. London: Studio Vista. OCLC 469450703.
- Parker, John, ed. (1925). Who's Who in the Theatre (fifth ed.). London: Sir Isaac Pitman and Sons. OCLC 10013159.
- St Pierre, Paul Matthew (2009). Music Hall Mimesis in British Film, 1895–1960: On the Halls on the Screen. Madison, NJ: Associated University Press. ISBN 978-0-8386-4191-0.
