= Dorothy Brunton =

Australian singer and actress

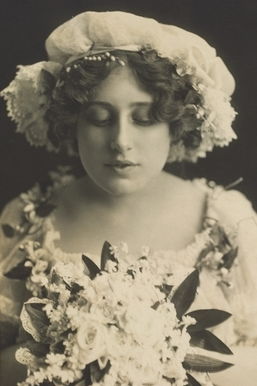
- Portrait of Dorothy Brunton in about 1920.
- Born: Christine Dorothy Brunton; 11 October 1890; Carlton, Victoria
- Died: 5 June 1977 (aged 86); Darlinghurst, New South Wales, Australia
- Occupations: Actress, singer
- Spouse: Ben Dawson
- Parents: John Brunton (father); Cecily Neilsen (mother)

Christine Dorothy Brunton (11 October 1890 – 5 June 1977), popularly known as Dorothy Brunton (or more familiarly as 'Dot'), was an Australian singer and actress prominent in musical comedy in Australia and England from the early-1910s to the mid-1930s. She was born into a theatrical family, her mother had been an actress and her father worked as a stage scene designer and painter. Her early roles were in melodramas for the Bland Holt touring company, for which her father worked. From October 1910 Brunton was engaged by J. C. Williamson's New Comic Opera Company, performing in musical comedy roles and acting as understudy to more established actresses.

By the outbreak of World War I, Brunton was playing leading roles in J. C. Williamson's productions. She became associated with recruitment and patriotic fund-raising efforts and became a favourite with Australian soldiers. In September 1917, Brunton travelled to the United States, where she appeared in several productions but achieved only moderate theatrical success. She arrived in London in June 1918, where she found a small part in a West End production. Her fame grew after rapturous responses to her performances by Australian soldiers on leave.

After the war ended, Brunton lived in London and the United States, occasionally returning to Australia where she was acclaimed as a much-beloved performer. After a nine-month tour of South Africa in 1926-7 and a couple of moderately-successful plays in London, Brunton returned to Australia in 1930 for theatrical engagements by J. C. Williamson Ltd. She married in 1931. In 1934, she retired from the stage and returned to London with her husband. After the death of her husband, Brunton returned to Australia in 1947 and lived in Sydney until her death in 1977, aged 86.

== Biography ==
=== Early years ===
Christine Dorothy Brunton was born on 11 October 1890 in the inner-city Melbourne suburb of Carlton, the third child of John Brunton and Cecily Christina Neilsen.^{[A]} Her father was an artist born in Edinburgh and her mother (known as 'Cissy') had been a Shakespearean actress in Edinburgh. John Brunton's relationship with Cecily Neilsen was a de facto spousal union, as Brunton had been married to Sarah Hotchkis in 1870 at Plymouth. John and Sarah Brunton had three children (born from 1872 to 1881). Brunton's wife Sarah lived until January 1910 and there is no record of a divorce (nor is there a record of any marriage between Brunton and Cecily Neilsen).

Dorothy Brunton's parents had arrived in Australia in 1886, where her father was employed as a theatrical scene designer and painter. By the late-1890s, John Brunton was working for Bland Holt, the theatrical manager known for his spectacular touring productions of melodramas and pantomimes. In an interview in 1912, Brunton recalled: "The stage has always had a fascination over me, and as you know, my father's vocation as scenic artist with Mr. Bland Holt's Company, brought me into contact with actors and actresses when I was but a little dot".

Dorothy received part of her education at Alford House in Elizabeth Bay in Sydney. From 1905, she attended the Presbyterian Ladies' College in the eastern Melbourne suburb of Burwood.

In the 1912 interview, Dorothy recalled that her father "was at first inclined" to keep her on at school. However, "owing to the solicitations" of Bland Holt's wife Florence, her father "was persuaded to allow me to accompany him to New Zealand where I was soon smuggled into small parts". With her father painting the stage scenery for Holt, young Dorothy "travelled all over Australia and New Zealand with the company".

=== Dramatic roles ===
On 18 April 1908, Dorothy Brunton "made her first appearance on any stage" as a flower girl in Bland Holt's production of The White Heather at the Theatre Royal in Adelaide. Following her debut in The White Heather, Brunton was cast in a series of productions presented by Bland Holt's Dramatic Company in the Theatre Royal in Adelaide:

- One of the Best, a melodrama written by Seymour Hicks and George Edwardes, which opened on 5 May 1908; Brunton was cast as 'Miss Maisie McTosh'.
- The Great Millionaire by Cecil Raleigh, opened on 9 May 1908; Brunton was cast in the role of 'Beatrice de Grosvenor'.
- The Breaking of the Drought, an Australian melodrama written by Arthur Shirley, which opened on 16 May 1908; Brunton "filled the minor part of waiting maid in a winsome manner".
- The Bondman, an adaptation of Hall Caine's novel, opened on 26 May 1908; Brunton played "a dainty Mona" in the play.
- The Great Rescue, an Australian melodrama, opened on 30 May 1908; a critic for Adelaide's The Advertiser commented that "clever Miss Dorothy Brunton hid her identity under the raiment of Wi Lung, the Chinese servant".
- The Flood Tide, Cecil Raleigh's "spectacular, sensational and amusing melodrama", opened on 6 June 1908; Brunton "was a pretty gipsy girl" in the play.

After their eight-week season in Adelaide, the Bland Holt Company played a short season in Broken Hill. From there, the company travelled to Perth in Western Australia. On 11 July 1908, they staged The Breaking of the Drought in His Majesty's Theatre where once again Brunton was cast as "the waiting maid".

By June 1909, the Bland Holt Dramatic Company had returned to Sydney. The Great Rescue opened at the Theatre Royal in early June 1909, with Brunton again in the role of the Chinese servant, 'Wi Lung'.

Dorothy's father, John Brunton, died "from heart failure" on 22 July 1909 at his home in Darlinghurst. On 12 August 1909, Dorothy participated in a grand theatrical event commemorating her late father. 'The Brunton Memorial Matinee', Bland Holt's production at the Theatre Royal in aid of the John Brunton Memorial Fund, was an event involving "over two hundred" performers from a number of theatrical companies. In September 1909, Brunton was performing the role of the gypsy fortune teller in Sydney performances of The Flood Tide, with the production using the scenery created by her late father.

=== Musical comedy roles ===
In 1910, Brunton began taking singing lessons with Grace Miller Ward, the wife of actor and theatrical producer Hugh J. Ward. She later credited Mrs. Ward with the nurturing of her "singing and acting possibilities", training her voice to qualify for musical comedy roles. Brunton recalled that "Mrs. Hugh Ward arranged personally that my voice should be trained for singing, and kept me hard at it, taking the deepest personal interest in my development and helping me on in every way". Brunton also took dancing lessons with Jennie Brenan at her dance studio in Melbourne.

After the retirement of the popular performer Fanny Dango, the J. C. Williamson theatrical management company sought to find a replacement with a similar appeal to audiences.^{[B]} Grace Ward brought her protégé, Dorothy Brunton, under the notice of her husband, who was then a managing director with J. C. Williamson Ltd. Brunton was tried in roles formerly played by Dango, the first of which was 'Elaine' in A Knight for a Day. By October 1910, Dorothy Brunton had joined J. C. Williamson's New Comic Opera Company. She performed in the company's production of A Knight for a Day, described as "an American musical farce extravaganza", which opened in Adelaide at the Theatre Royal on 18 October 1910. She was cast as 'Elaine' (Mme. Woodbury's daughter) in the production. A critic commented that "she has an attractive personality, talent, and enthusiasm, and will succeed". Brunton's song in the musical, 'Baby Land', "with the pony ballet and the grotesque marionette dolls was thoroughly enjoyed". After her father's death, Dorothy Brunton's mother Cissy became her constant companion and mentor as she travelled across Australia with the New Comic Opera Company. Cissy Brunton remained an important supporter in her daughter's life and career until her death in 1933, "a loving but honest and helpful critic".

Brunton's performances in A Knight for a Day "found immediate acceptance from the public". In June 1911, Brunton played the role of the attendant of the Princess (played by Florence Young) in The Balkan Princess at the Theatre Royal in Sydney. By October 1911, Brunton was playing 'Magda' (a charwoman at the palace) in The Balkan Princess when it played at His Majesty's Theatre in Brisbane. The Merry Widow at His Majesty's Theatre in Brisbane in October 1911, Brunton playing 'Fi Fi'. From November 1911, Brunton was engaged by the Julius Knight Company in a revival of The Sign of the Cross. Described by the Bulletin critic as an "irresistible medley of religion, bellow-drama and eroticism", the play was performed at the Theatre Royal in Sydney with Brunton in the dramatic role of 'Stephanus'.

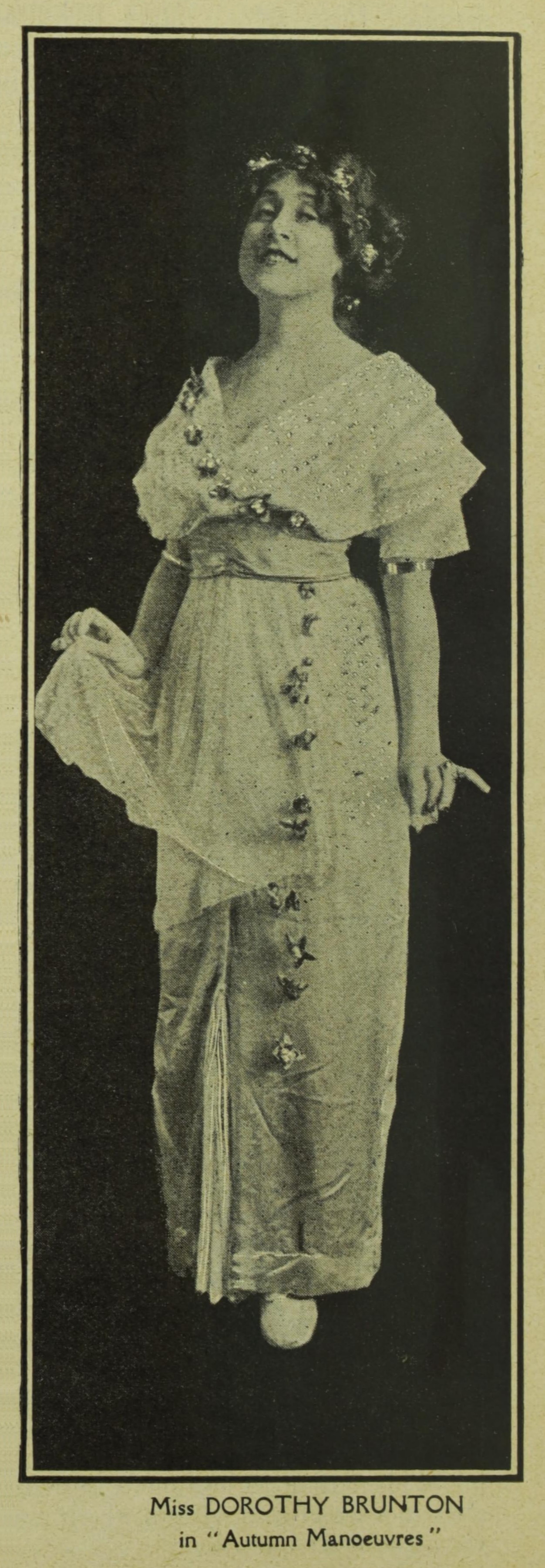
Miss Dorothy Brunton in Autumn Manoeuvres, published in The Lone Hand magazine, August 1913.

By January 1912, Brunton was back with J. C. Williamson's New Comic Opera Company, under the management of which she was to remain for the next five years. The following are early roles she played with the company:

- The Cingalee ("the love-story of Ceylon and its tea plantations"); at the Theatre Royal in Sydney from late-January 1912; at Her Majesty's Theatre in Melbourne from late-May 1912. Brunton was cast as 'Peggy Sabine'.
- A short season in Newcastle in late-February 1912: The Girl in the Train (two nights) and The Balkan Princess (two nights).
- The Cingalee at Her Majesty's Theatre in Melbourne from late-May 1912.
- Nightbirds in the Criterion Theatre in Sydney from June 1912; Brunton playing 'Minna' (of Prince Orloffsky's private ballet).
- Dorothy in October 1912 in Sydney (with Brunton as 'Phyllis').

Brunton was given opportunities to extend her skills as the understudy for more experienced actresses. Early in her engagement with the New Comic Opera Company, she had been the appointed understudy for Lottie Sargent in The Dollar Princess and as 'Fifi' in The Merry Widow. In June 1912, in the Sydney revival of The Girl in the Train, she was given the opportunity to play Florence Young's role of 'Gonda Van der Loo' on opening night after Young caught a cold and lost her voice (a circumstance she later confessed "just made me quake"). Her performance "proved quite a surprise packet"; a critic remarked that she "gave a bright, intelligent, and quite charming impersonation of the role" and in the duet with W. Talleur Andrews "she shared the honours of an enthusiastic recall". In 1912 in Melbourne, after Sybil Arundale became ill, Brunton took on the role of 'Jana Van Buran' in The Girl in the Train, "and delighted the audiences by her charm, bewitching personality and acting ability". On an occasion when Brunton took the place of Miss Arundale, the critic for The Bulletin commented that Brunton was "most fully qualified to get the adulation usually reserved for imported artists". The critic remarked on "her pretty appearance, with singing to match" and added: "she is already a graceful actress, who plays an emotional part as though she felt it". Brunton later remarked in an interview: "I never understudied a part I didn't play", adding "I seem to have put the 'fluence in them all".

Brunton's first major role in a musical comedy was in Autumn Manoeuvres, which opened on 28 June 1913 at Her Majesty's Theatre in Sydney, presented by J. C. Williamson's New Comic Opera Company. Brunton was given the "charming comedy role" of 'June Pomeroy', "the most important the young actress has yet essayed".

In addition to Autumn Manoeuvres, Brunton performed in the following productions during the period March 1913 to October 1914:

- The Belle of New York (with Brunton playing 'Fifi') in March 1913 at the Theatre Royal in Sydney and in May 1913 at Brisbane's His Majesty's Theatre.
- The Count of Luxembourg in late-July 1913 at His Majesty's Theatre in Brisbane.
- The Arcadians in August 1913 in Brisbane (with Brunton as 'Chrysea').
- The Chocolate Soldier in late-April 1914 in Adelaide, with Brunton playing 'Mascha'.
- Gipsy Love at Her Majesty's Theatre in Sydney from June 1914, with Brunton in the role of 'Jolan' (described as "a bright-eyed, happy girl, filled with the joy of life").
- Princess Caprice (with Brunton playing 'Clementine'): at His Majesty's Theatre in Brisbane in August 1914; Her Majesty's Theatre in Melbourne in October 1914.

=== The war years in Australia ===
From late-December 1914, Brunton performed in The Girl in the Film at Her Majesty's Theatre in Sydney. Her performance on opening night was lauded as "a distinct triumph", the critic remarking that "she filled every requirement of an exacting role". Her role in the musical comedy required the "interpretation of several personages... first as the General's daughter, then as the 'Vioscope' author's messenger; subsequently as the drummer boy, and as the miller's daughter, vocally and otherwise she was put to a test that would have severely tried a performer of more matured and wider experience".

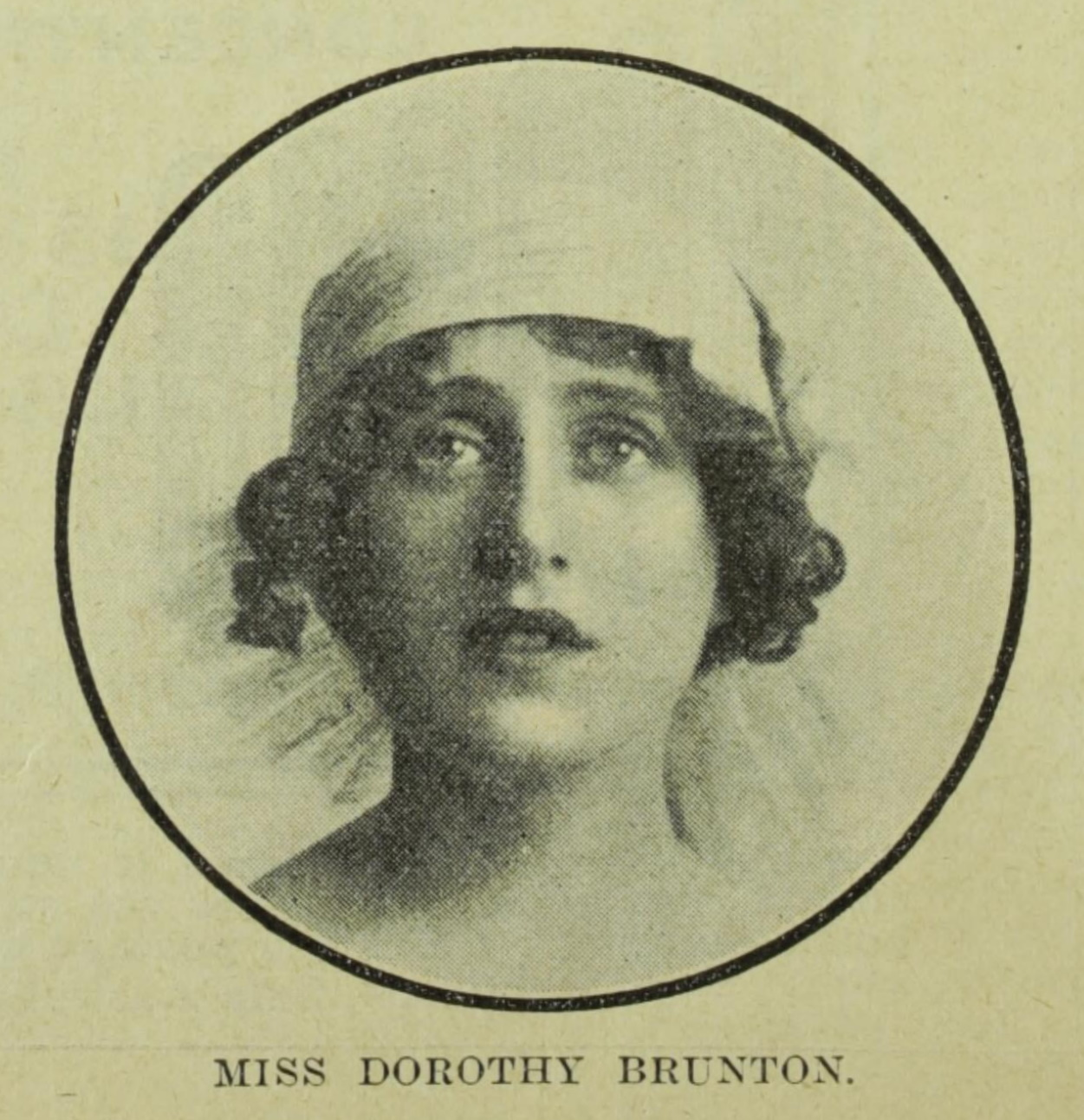
Portrait of Dorothy Brunton, published in The Lone Hand magazine, May 1915.

At the suggestion of a theatrical manager, the patriotic recruiting song 'Your King and Country Want You' was introduced into performances of The Girl on the Film, sung by Dorothy Brunton. The song, with words and music by Paul Rubens, had been published in London at the start of the war in 1914 by Chappell Music. It was written as "A Woman's Recruiting Song", to be sung with the intention of persuading men to volunteer to fight in the war. Brunton became associated with the song, which in Australia was also known as 'We Don't Want to Lose You' (from the chorus: "Oh! we don't want to lose you but we think you ought to go; For your King and your Country both need you so"). Within a week of incorporating the song in her performances, Brunton was informed by recruiting officers that "recruiting had gone up by several thousands'. In January 1916 she recalled: "I sang that early in the war as a recruiting song, and have had many letters saying that it caused men to join the colors".

The musical farce High Jinks had its inaugural Australian performance at Her Majesty's Theatre, Sydney, on 6 February 1915, with Brunton in the role of 'Sylvia Dale'. J. C. Williamson's production, described as a "musical jollity" with "plenty of dash and sparkle", opened in Melbourne in late-March, Adelaide in late-May and Brisbane in August 1915. High Jinks was also staged in Perth in June 1915. It was initially advertised as having the same cast as the Melbourne production, but Brunton's role in the performances was played by another actress (to the annoyance of a writer for the local Sunday Times newspaper who wrote that "evidently she is considered too good for a one-horse town like Perth").

The Girl on the Film was taken to Melbourne, commencing on 3 July 1915 at Her Majesty's Theatre.

On 30 July 1915, a "combined theatrical matinee" was held at Melbourne's Her Majesty's Theatre to raise money for Australia's wounded soldiers. The programme was made up of "the pick of the items from the city theatres". Between the various performances, Dorothy Brunton auctioned a number of donated items from the stage. At one point, she announced that her garters were to be auctioned. The initial bidding "rose rapidly to £4". As an added inducement, Miss Brunton then took her garters off, "after discreetly turning her back to the spectators". Further bidding ensued "until the hammer fell at £6 6/". At the finale of the matinee, Brunton sang 'Your King and Country Want You' "with stirring effect" as "a long file of soldiers and sailors, representing Australia, Great Britain and all the Allies, marched through the stalls, on to the stage and into the wing". This was immediately followed by a theatrical representation of the Gallipoli landing, featuring khaki-clad men "landing from naval boats on a rugged shore" amidst "the crackle of rifle fire", described as "a realistic picture of a feat that makes the heart of every Australian beat with pride". The total receipts from the event amounted to £1,650.

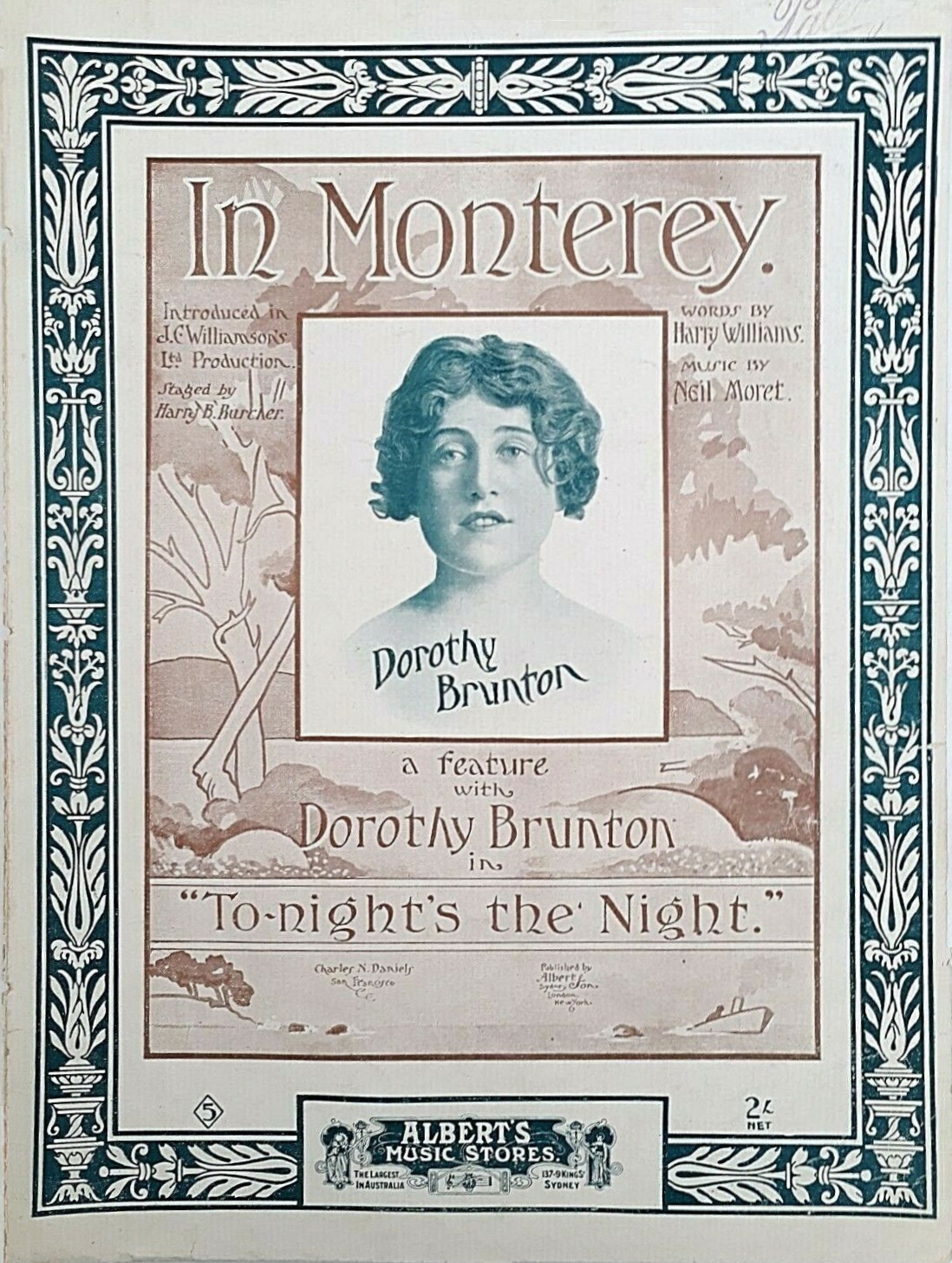
The cover of the sheet music of 'In Monterey' (from the musical To-night's the Night), published in 1915.

Brunton performed in the following productions during the period August 1915 to December 1916:

- A revival of The Belle of New York (with Brunton in the title role of the Salvation Army girl 'Violet Gray') in August 1915 at His Majesty's Theatre in Brisbane.
- The revival of The Girl in the Taxi in late-August 1915 at Her Majesty's Theatre in Sydney, with Brunton playing 'Suzanne', "the pleasure-loving wife" of 'Pomeral', scent manufacturer of Tours. She "gave a delightful picture of the pretty, frivolous, and coquettish young wife, and musically and dramatically scored a decided hit". By late October 1914 The Girl in the Taxi was playing in Melbourne at Her Majesty's Theatre (with Brunton cast as "the lively Jacqueline").
- So Long, Letty had its Australian debut in late December 1915 in Sydney, with Brunton in the role of 'Letty', one of the two female leads alongside the well-known London comedienne Connie Ediss. A critic commented: "Miss Brunton's girlishness, and the frailty of her physique, formed a foil to Miss Ediss, whose low comedy was always amusing". As 'Letty' in So Long, Letty, Brunton attained the achievement of appearing in one role for one hundred consecutive performances.
- To-night's the Night opened in July 1916 at Her Majesty's Theatre in Melbourne; Brunton played the role of 'June', the fiancée of "a fickle aristocrat".
- A Waltz Dream was revived by J. C. Williamson Ltd. at Her Majesty's Theatre in Sydney on 10 December 1916, with Brunton cast as 'Frances' (or 'Franzi'), the leader of the ladies' orchestra. Later in the month the production commenced a tour of New Zealand, opening in Wellington on 26 December.

Dot Brunton became a favourite with Australian soldiers. Parties of soldiers, stationed in training camps prior to overseas deployment, attended her performances into which patriotic songs and displays were incorporated. At each performance Brunton received requests to sing 'We Don't Want to Lose You'. On three successive nights during performances of So Long, Letty in Sydney, the evening was brought to a close by a military band playing the National Anthem. Afterwards, the band and groups of soldiers gathered in Market Street, giving "three cheers" and playing the song 'So Long, Betty' as "Miss Brunton leaned out of her dressing-room window and blew the boys a kiss". In January 1916, it was reported there was four hundred recruits at the Broadmeadows camp, on Melbourne's outskirts, calling themselves "the Dorothy Brunton Boys". The actress proudly recounted receiving a letter from a soldier at Gallipoli which read: "It is girls like you we went out to fight for". Brunton and her company presented entertainments for the soldiers at the Randwick and Liverpool training camps in improvised theatres. She also organised concert parties at military hospitals, "which entertained war-broken men in the wards". Soldiers at the front "took her image with them to the battlefield, they sang her songs on the march and in the trenches". To the letters soldiers sent to her, Brunton replied with signed photographs, "her correspondence growing to as many as 60 or 70 letters a day".

Dorothy's older brother, John Brunton (known as 'Jack'), enlisted in the A.I.F. in May 1916 at Prahan in Melbourne. As a young man, Jack Brunton had travelled extensively, spending periods of time in England, West Africa, Mexico and the United States. In America, he found a job travelling with motion pictures along the Pacific Coast and to Alaska. By 1914, he was back in Australia where he presented lectures in conjunction with films shot in the Arctic regions. When he enlisted in the army, Jack Brunton owned and managed two motion picture theatres in Melbourne (including the Paradise Theatre in St. Kilda).

In 1916, Brunton made her screen debut in the silent film Seven Keys to Baldpate for J. C. Williamson Films, cast in the role of the lady reporter 'Mary Norton'. The film, directed by Monte Luke, was an adaption of a stage-play; "a comedy thriller about a practical joke played on a novelist at a lonely country inn". It was shot in Melbourne, at the Theatre Royal and J.C. Williamson's studio in Exhibition Street, over about three weeks from late November to early December 1915. Brunton and the male lead in the film, Fred Maguire, were both appearing in The Girl in the Taxi at Her Majesty's Theatre while filming proceeded during the day. In May 1916 Seven Keys to Baldpate was screened at The Hub cinema in Newtown and was occasionally shown in country cinemas, but in general it was "ignored by reviewers".

From about 1913, the Rexona soap manufacturing company began to use celebrity testimonials in its advertising, particularly favouring attractive actresses and dancers. In 1914, the company began its "Rexona Girl" campaign, a publicity strategy that continued until the 1940s, featuring endorsements for their products from a range of celebrities who were members of the "Rexona Club". Dorothy Brunton ("the idol of Musical Comedy lovers") began to appear in Rexona advertisements from December 1916, beginning a longstanding association with the company. She was featured in national advertising for Rexona soaps until 1929.

In February 1917, it had been reported that Brunton intended to "leave for America on a twelve months' holiday tour... after five years' continuous work". In August 1917, newspapers published claims that Brunton had been engaged by Oliver Morosco, a prominent New York theatrical manager. Brunton performed in the following productions prior to her departure for America:

- Canary Cottage (with Brunton as 'Trixie Fair') from late-March 1917 at Her Majesty's Theatre in Melbourne; from June 1917 at Her Majesty's Theatre in Sydney.
- Three Twins from late-May 1917 at Her Majesty's Theatre in Melbourne, with Brunton playing 'Kate Armitage'.

There was a special celebration for the popular actress on the last night of Three Twins in early-June 1917, Brunton's last performance in Melbourne before her overseas departure. The second act was "considerably altered" to include renditions by the company of "many old favorites" (songs from previous productions in which Brunton had featured). At the finale "paper streamers were flung from all parts of the house to Miss Brunton, and scores of bouquets and floral baskets quickly lined the stage".

=== America ===
Dot Brunton and her mother departed from Sydney aboard the S.S. Sonoma on 8 September 1917 and arrived at San Francisco on 27 September. They proceeded to Los Angeles where Dorothy had intended to "rehearse the principal part in Morosco's latest musical comedy" called What's Next?. However, Brunton ended up declining the role "owing to the absolute need for more rest after years of continuous work in Australia". Brunton and her mother then travelled to New York by easy stages, where "her Australian reputation led to several offers", but she finally decided on Follow the Girl, a new musical comedy. In January 1918, it was reported that Brunton was to make her first appearance on the American stage at Philadelphia in Follow the Girl.

Follow the Girl, a new musical comedy by Henry Blossom and Zoel Parenteau, premiered at the Adelphi Theatre in Philadelphia on New Year's Eve 1917. Reviews of the show were "liberal and favorable". Brunton played in Follow the Girl for a fortnight in Philadelphia before she began rehearsals for Ivan Caryll's Madame and her Godson under the management of Klaw and Erlanger in New York.

Brunton later revealed that her American engagements were based on a misunderstanding of her dramatic qualities. She explained that she had been "engaged as a low comedienne" based on a mistaken understanding of her Australian roles in So Long Letty and Canary Cottage, in the belief she "had played Connie Ediss' parts". When the mistake was discovered, Hugh Ward, who was in America at the time, advised Brunton "to cancel the contract".

In May 1918 in New York, Brunton recorded a number of songs with the Canadian tenor, Paul Dufault. Songs from those recording sessions were later released by Columbia Records in Australia and the United Kingdom.

=== London ===
Dot Brunton and her mother left from New York aboard the R.M.S. Saxonia, a steamship of the Cunard line, and arrived at London in June 1918.

In London, Brunton was not able to secure an engagement "on the strength of her Australian reputation". She arrived "without either letters of introduction or influence". As she later described, she "walked the streets looking for work". However, during this period she "aimed high", always seeking an engagement in London's West End. By mid-July, through an employment agency, Brunton managed to secure a small part as 'Fan Tan' in the operetta Shanghai, to commence in late-August at the Theatre Royal in Drury Lane.

At her first appearance in Shanghai in late-August 1918, Brunton was vigorously applauded by a group of Australian soldiers. As Brunton later described: "The Diggers got me my chance"; the group of soldiers who attended the performance "nearly pulled the theatre down with their applause". An article in The Newcastle Sun, reporting on her appearance, suggested that London theatre managers were engaging Australian performers to take advantage of the thousands of Australian troops on leave "as it would ensure for them a good attendance of Australian soldiers". Nevertheless, the enthusiastic response to Brunton's appearance at Drury Lane was noted in the London press. The critic from The Times described Brunton as "a delightful little sweetheart, whose charm and merriment were an admirable foil" to the leading actor, Alfred Lester. A columnist in London's Daily Mirror remarked: "For the first time in my life I heard the Australian bush cry of 'Coo-ee!' in a London theatre... [when] little Miss Dorothy Brunton, our latest Australian ingénue, appeared upon the stage". Of Brunton's relatively minor role in Shanghai, a critic remarked: "Miss Dorothy Brunton, so enthusiastically received by her Australian admirers, was only permitted to reveal on a small scale the vivacity she would seem to have at command". In October 1918, it was reported that Brunton and Ivy Shilling, an Australian dancer also in the cast of Shanghai, "have arranged to present every Anzac" who attended the operetta "with autographed photographs of themselves".

In early January 1918, Brunton took on the major role of 'Marlene de Launay' in the operetta Soldier Boy, playing at the Apollo Theatre in London's West End (replacing the popular actress Winifred Barnes).

In London, Brunton and her mother lived in a flat in Regent Street which became known as a haven of hospitality for Australian soldiers on leave. The flat was called 'The Digger's Rest' where the two women "dispensed cheery hospitality of the true Australian brand" to soldiers of all ranks.

In London, Brunton expressed a degree of disquiet about her role, early in the war, in assisting the recruitment of Australian soldiers. In April 1919, she was reported to have said: "I do not know, by the way, whether all the recruits have been grateful to me for my assistance in sending them to the Front". She added: "Not long ago I heard of an Australian who, waist deep in Flanders mud, remarked to a comrade: 'I wonder when I shall meet the girl who sang me into this?'".

During the remainder of her time in London, Dorothy Brunton also appeared in the following productions:

- Harold Brighouse's farce Bantam, V.C. at St. Martin's Theatre in London from July 1919; Brunton's role as the heroine was a critical success, with the London newspapers praising "her clever and vivacious acting in the non-musical part".
- The musical comedy Baby Bunting at the Shaftesbury Theatre in London from 25 September 1919; London's Daily Mail newspaper said of Brunton's role: "She keeps the ball of fun rolling without the smallest apparent effort, and in the most trying situations preserves her native charm".

=== Brief return to Australia ===
Brunton arrived back in Australia in early September 1920 under a year-long engagement to J. C. Williamson Ltd. She made her reappearance on the Australian stage at Sydney's Her Majesty's Theatre on 2 October 1920 in the production of Yes, Uncle!. At her first appearance in the role of the young widow, 'Mabel Mannering', the audience "insisted on holding up the comedy while they applauded and coo-eed to their favorite actress". At the end of the night, Brunton "voiced her appreciation of the wonderful reception accorded her".

Brunton played 'Janet Chester' in J. C. Williamson's production of Baby Bunting, the first performance of which was at the Criterion Theatre in Sydney on Christmas Eve 1920 (reprising a role she had played in London). Baby Bunting was performed in Melbourne from late February 1921.

From June 1921, Brunton played the role of the pickpocket 'Fanny Welch' (alias 'Faintin' Fanny') in Oh Lady! Lady!! at Her Majesty's Theatre in Melbourne.

At the final performance of Oh Lady! Lady!! in Melbourne in late July 1921, Brunton "was very warmly acclaimed by admirers". Each of her songs were "greatly applauded, the gallery being particularly demonstrative". After insistent demands for a speech after the final curtain, Miss Brunton declared to the audience: "I cannot say good-bye. Melbourne has always been too good to me and I belong to Australia". For her farewell performance in Sydney on 21 October, every seat at the Theatre Royal was booked in advance, despite which crowds gathered "in the vain hope of securing a place". After the performance, Brunton "could not respond to enough encores to please her admirers". She was presented with a pearl necklace with a diamond clasp, "bouquets were showered upon her" and the audience rose and sang 'For She's a Jolly Good Fellow'. Brunton responded by saying, "she was sick at the thought of going away from her homeland again". After warmly thanking the audience and the company, she added, "Please, please don't forget me".

=== America and Europe ===
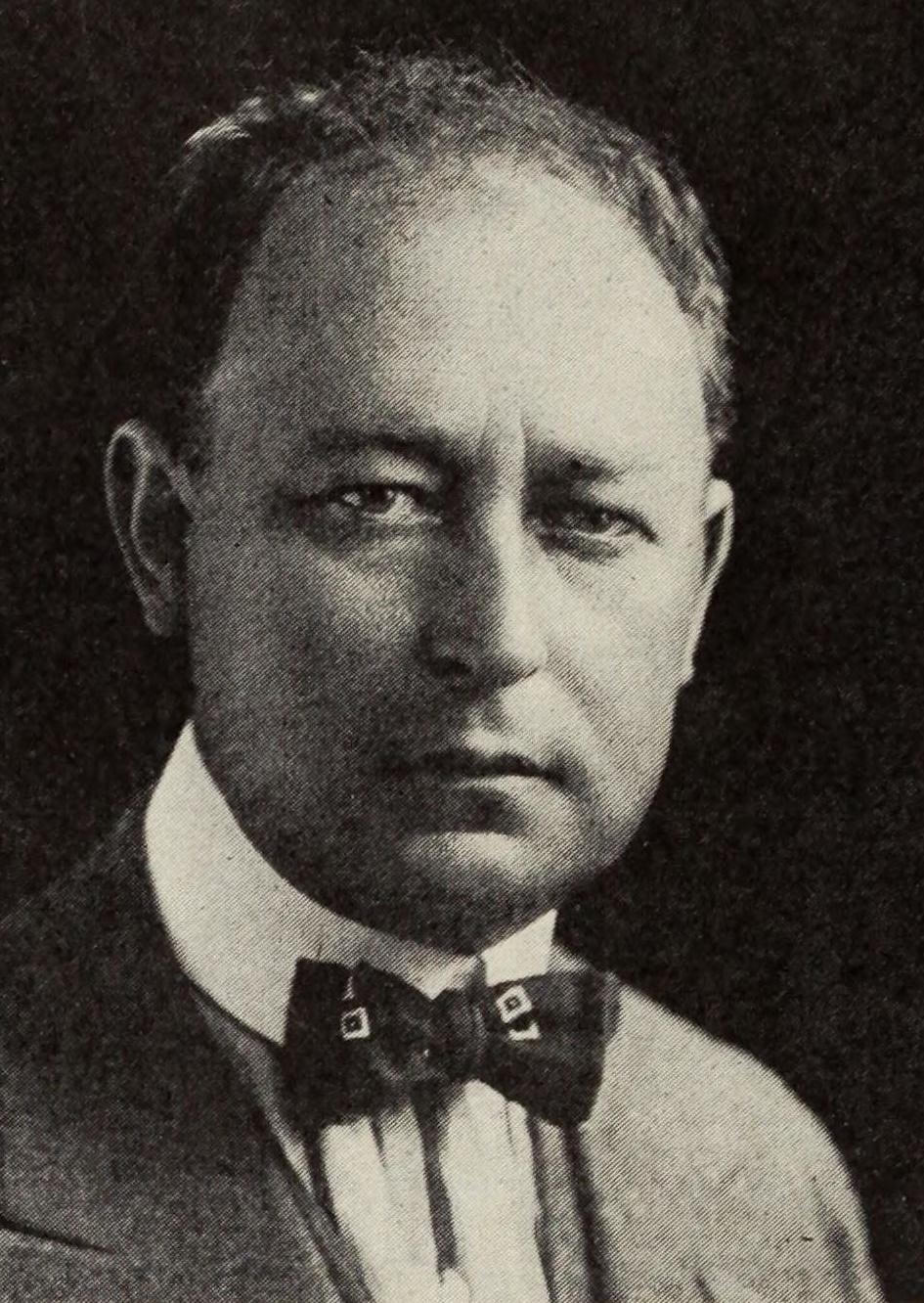
Robert Brunton (1872 – 1923), Dorothy's half-brother (from Wid's Year Book: 1921).

Dorothy Brunton and her mother travelled to America to visit with family members. Robert Brunton, Dorothy's 51 year-old half-brother, had been living in Los Angeles for many years where his Robert Brunton Film Studios was "amongst the most important in the city".^{[C]} His studios were located on a 65-acre site in the Hollywood district of Los Angeles, its prime purpose being for the leasing of facilities to motion picture companies that did not possess their own studios. Jack Brunton, Dorothy's 35-year-old brother, was working for his half-brother at that time as "the producing manager" for the business.^{[D]} The actress and her mother departed from Sydney aboard the S.S. Sonoma on 2 November 1921 and arrived at San Francisco on 22 November where they were met by Jack Brunton. The three family members then travelled to Los Angeles to stay with Robert Brunton.

Robert Brunton had been engaged in the process of selling the Brunton Studios and the sale of his holdings was finalised at about the time Dot and 'Cissy' Brunton's arrival in November 1921. The new owners were a New York-based syndicate headed by Joseph Schenck, a leading independent producer of motion pictures. In an interview in a trade newspaper, Brunton expressed a desire to establish a film production studio near London. The Schenck syndicate renamed the studio complex United Studios, which was placed under the management of Michael C. Levee (who had previously been Brunton's vice-president and treasurer).

In February 1922, Dorothy and Robert Brunton travelled to Italy, while Cissy Brunton travelled back to Sydney aboard the S.S. Sonoma. Robert had planned a holiday with his "little sister" and together they toured Europe, visiting Italy, France, Switzerland, Germany "and other countries in a leisurely way". After arriving in London, they "followed this by motoring in their own car all over England and Scotland".

By January 1923, Dorothy Brunton had returned to the stage, appearing in Oh Lady! Lady!! at the Garrick Theatre under the management of Wilfred Cotton and Leslie Powell.

Dorothy's half-brother, Robert Brunton, died on 4 March 1923 in London of a cerebral haemorrhage (after two weeks' illness), aged 51 years. Probate was granted to Dorothy Brunton (effects amounting to £375).

After the death of her half-brother, Dorothy returned to the United States and spent time with her brother Jack in Florida. Her brother had relocated to Florida after the sale and transfer of the Brunton Studios to United Studios Inc. By July 1922, Jack Brunton had taken over the general management of Miami Studios Inc. in Miami Florida, where he "purchased a beautiful estate". By July 1923, Australian newspapers were reporting that Dorothy Brunton had been engaged by Hugh J. Ward for a theatrical return to Australia.

Brunton returned to London and, before leaving for Australia, appeared briefly in Tons of Money (the play for which she had been engaged by Hugh Ward, alongside the British actor Charles Heslop, for her return to the Australian stage). Tons of Money was a departure from her usual musical comedy roles. Brunton herself described the play as "a farce-comedy with witty dialogue and many happy situations". Tons of Money had been running to crowded houses at the London's Aldwych Theatre and towards the end of its run, Ward arranged for Brunton and Heslop to appear in the leading character roles as a prelude to their Australian performances.

=== Return to Australia ===
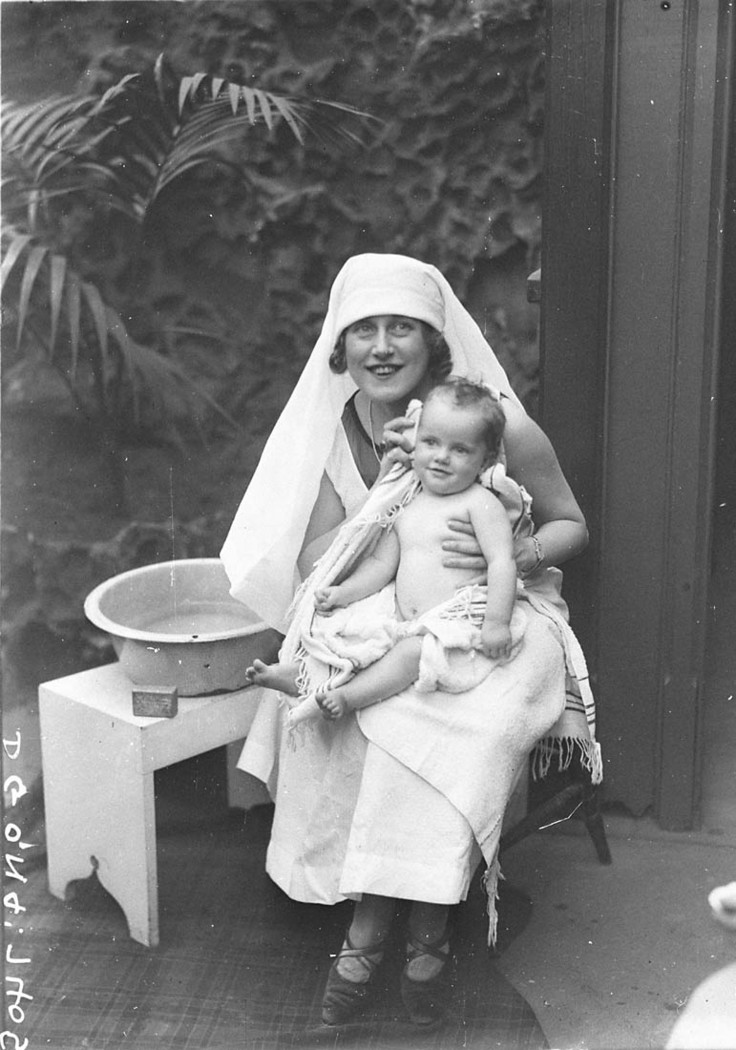
Miss Dorothy Brunton bathing a baby at St. Margaret's Hospital in Sydney in a publicity shoot for a Rexona soap advertising campaign (January 1925).

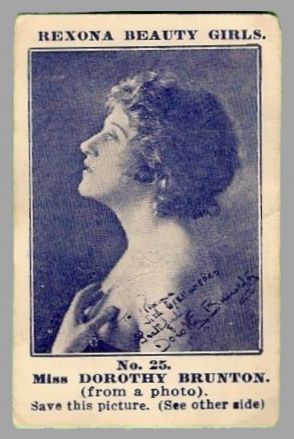
'Rexona Beauty Girls' card No. 25 – Miss Dorothy Brunton; the cards came wrapped with cakes of Rexona Soap.

In October 1923 Dot Brunton returned to Australia from London on board the Orient liner S.S. Orsova. She disembarked at Fremantle and travelled by rail to Melbourne via Adelaide. For her return to the Australian stage Brunton had been engaged by Hugh Ward to perform in Tons of Money, alongside the British actor Charles Heslop. The play opened its Melbourne season on 27 October 1923 at the New Palace Theatre in Melbourne, with Brunton in the role of 'Louise Allington'.

Tons of Money opened at the Grand Opera House in Sydney on 1 March 1924, by which time the play had been transformed into a musical comedy by the inclusion of songs by Brunton, Heslop and another cast member, Andrew Higginson. During the Melbourne season Ward had "observed a general feeling amongst playgoers that music should be introduced", prompting the change. In May 1924, towards the end of the Sydney season of Tons of Money, Ward instituted a "souvenir week" at the Grand Opera House where every person attending a performance received an autographed portrait of Dorothy Brunton, printed in three colours.

Over the next couple of years Dorothy Brunton also performed in the following Hugh J. Ward productions:

- After Tons of Money closed in Sydney, Brunton and Heslop played the lead roles in the musical comedy Mr. Battling Butler (a Hugh J. Ward production), which opened at Melbourne's New Princess Theatre in late-May 1924 and at the Grand Opera House in Sydney in March 1925.
- The musical comedy The Rise of Rosie O'Reilly opened at the New Princess Theatre in Melbourne in August 1924, with Brunton in the role of 'Rosie' ("in which she is transposed from a poor waterside girl to a millionaire's mansion"). The production was brought to Sydney in December 1924.
- The musical comedy Little Jessie James, with Brunton in the lead role of 'Jessie Jamieson'; performed initially in the Victoria Theatre in Newcastle (from late-March 1925) and then at the Grand Opera House, Sydney, from June to September 1925.
- The Music Box Revue at Grand Opera House, Sydney, during September and November 1925.

In January 1925, between performances of The Rise of Rosie O'Reilly, Brunton was photographed by Sam Hood in a professional publicity shoot at St. Margaret's Hospital in Sydney. The musical comedy star was photographed at the maternity hospital in various poses with children, including bathing a baby. Photographs from the session were used in subsequent advertisements for Rexona soap.

On 24 June 1926 Edward Locke's The Climax was staged at His Majesty's Theatre in Perth by the experienced American character actor Guy Bates Post, who also played the lead male role in the play. The play was the third offering from the Guy Bates Post Company, concluding a successful season in Perth. It was reported that Post had only consented to produce The Climax in Australia after Dorothy Brunton agreed to play the female lead character, 'Adelina von Hagen'. The play opened at the Palace Theatre in Sydney in early July 1926. The Climax was described as "an emotional comedy" and represented a departure for Brunton from her usual musical comedy roles. Her "capacity for serious stage-work" was confirmed by Post who remarked on opening night in Sydney: "the heroine of the evening had been called upon to show youth and gaiety, a feeling for romance, a sense of tragedy, and charm as a singer, and had surmounted in turn all those difficulties".

=== South Africa and London ===
In September 1926, Brunton travelled with the Guy Bates Post Company to South Africa aboard the S.S. Ascanius to fulfil an engagement with African Theatres Ltd. The company's repertoire was made up of The Masqueraders, The Bad Man and The Climax. During the tour, it was reported that Brunton had decided to give up musical comedy roles, "feeling there was nothing more to learn in that direction", in favour of "going in for the heavier work". Brunton toured South Africa for nine months playing opposite Post in The Climax.

In August 1927, Post and Brunton performed The Climax at the Little Theatre in London. The English critics were generally complimentary towards the players but disparaged the "complaining sentimentalism" of the play itself. The Climax closed in London after thirty performances.

Early in 1928, Brunton travelled to New York to visit her brother Jack.

In June 1928, Brunton was contracted to play 'Fleurette', the female lead in the musical comedy, The White Camellia, opposite Harry Welchman. The production initially toured regional theatres, before its London season at Daly's Theatre from September 1928.

During the period in England, Brunton found the London winters to be "exceedingly trying". While performing in The White Camellia, she experienced a recurring cough, compelling her to be often unavailable for performances. "Theatres in England are experiencing bad times as a result of competition from the talkies"; "Successful shows are chiefly of light comic opera type".

=== Marriage ===
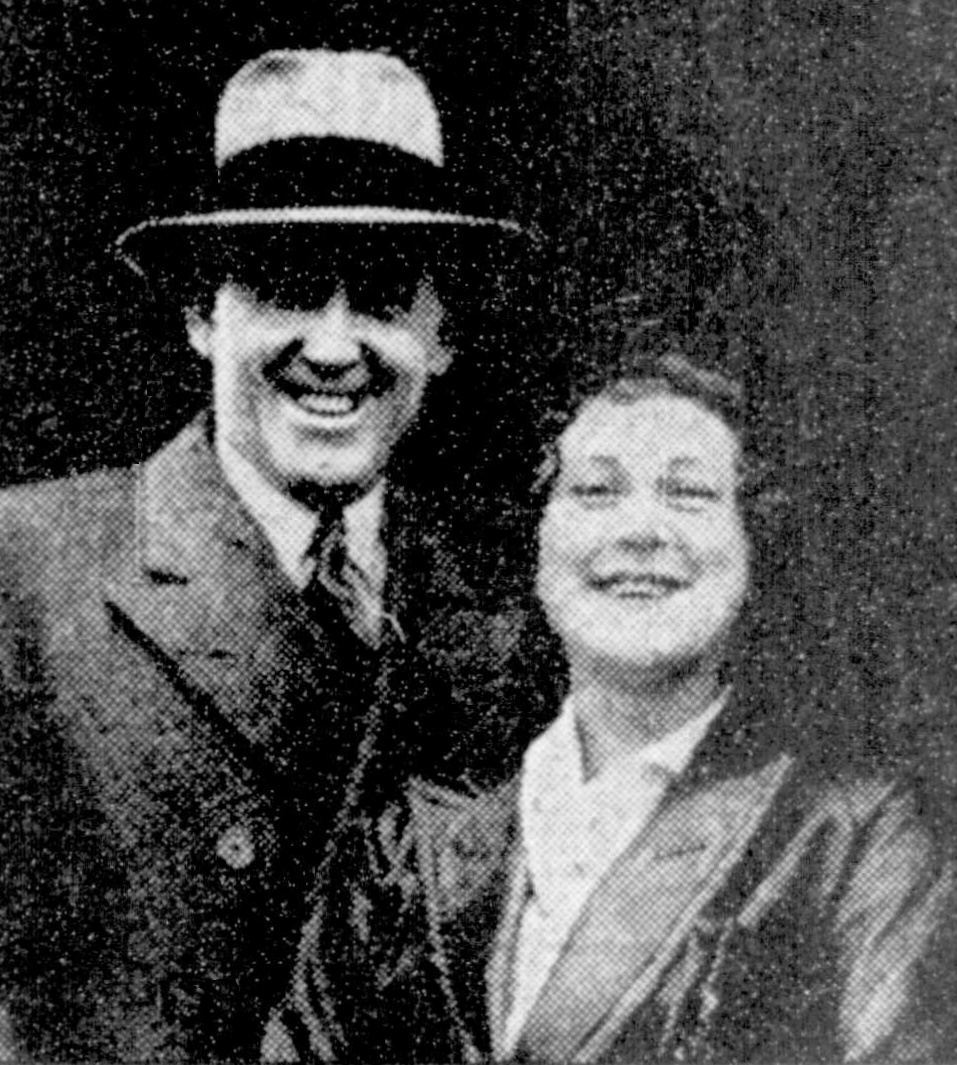
Dorothy Brunton and Ben Dawson, photographed in Adelaide in June 1931 (two months before their marriage).

In early November 1930, Brunton arrived in Melbourne on the Orient liner R.M.S. Oronsay after a four years' absence from Australia. She had come to spend Christmas with her mother, who she had not seen for two years, and told journalists that she intended returning to London in March 1931. In late December 1930, it was reported that J. C. Williamson Ltd. had secured her services for the lead role in Dearest Enemy, a musical written by Lorenz Hart and Richard Rodgers, to have its Australian premiere in Sydney in February 1931.

In May 1931, the J. C. Williamson's productions of Dearest Enemy, The Duchess of Danzig and The Merry Widow, each of them featuring Brunton in the lead roles, went to Brisbane. The three productions played in Adelaide in June and Perth in July.

By June 1931, Brunton had become engaged to Benjamin Dawson, a recently divorced businessman.^{[E]}

On Saturday morning, 15 August 1931, Dorothy Brunton arrived in Melbourne, having travelled by express train from Adelaide, and booked into the Oriental Hotel in Collins Street. At six o'clock that evening, Brunton and Ben Dawson were married at the Wesley Church in Lonsdale Street. The marriage was a private ceremony, with the actress' mother one of the few people who attended. Late in the afternoon, before the ceremony, Brunton had told a newspaper reporter "there was nothing in the rumour about her intended marriage".^{[F]} To get to the church unobserved they had left their hotel by the service lift and via "the servants' entrance in a back street". The next day the married couple travelled by motor-car to "a country golf-house" 40 miles from Melbourne, where they stayed for three nights, before returning to the city for Dorothy to attend a rehearsal of Duchess of Danzig.

The Duchess of Danzig opened at Melbourne's Theatre Royal in late-August 1931. The first Melbourne performance of Dearest Enemy was in September 1931, followed by The Merry Widow in November.

In late December 1931, Brunton played a lead role in the revival of an Edwardian musical comedy Florodora, first performed in Australia in 1900.

Brunton's mother, 'Cissy' Brunton, died "suddenly" in Sydney on 22 June 1933, aged 64 years. Her death was registered at Woollahra.

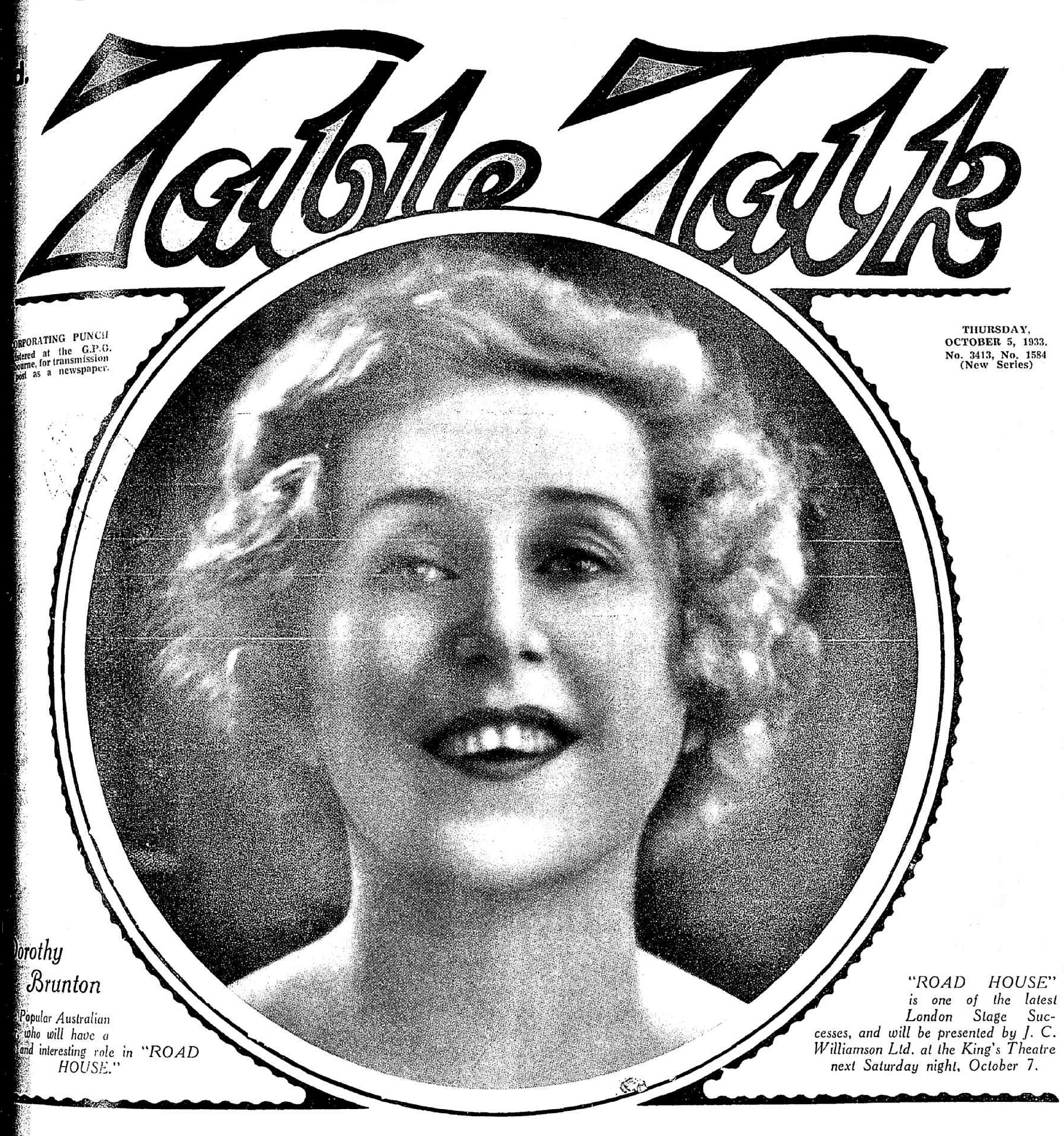
Portrait of Dorothy Brunton, from the cover of Table Talk newspaper, 5 October 1933.

Brunton was engaged by J. C. Williamson for performances of Walter Hackett's comedy, Road House, which had been "an obstinate success in London". The play had its Australian premier in Sydney in early September 1933 and its final performance on 11 November in Melbourne.

In February 1934, production of the film Clara Gibbings commenced in Melbourne, with Dorothy Brunton in the title role. It was one of the last films made by F. W. Thring's Efftee Film Attractions. Brunton's role, as the title character, was her "talkie debut". The film was an adaptation of an English stage comedy. Clara, the lead role, is the straight-talking owner of a London dockland public-house who discovers she is the legitimate (but abandoned) daughter of the Earl of Drumoor and launches herself in society. In the process, "she manages to get home some clever thrusts against the shams and hypocrisy of the life of elegance that she had thought so wonderful". During the shooting of the film Brunton admitted she was "finding it a little difficult to accustom herself to the screen technique after the comparative freedom of the stage". Clara Gibbings premiered at the Mayfair cinema in Melbourne in October 1934.

Ben and Dorothy Dawson travelled to England aboard the Orama, a vessel of the Orient Steam Navigation Company, arriving at Plymouth on 26 September 1934.

In 1940, during World War II, Dorothy and her husband were living in central London, in a ninth-floor penthouse flat overlooking Hyde Park. In September 1940 during a German air-raid they were sheltering in the cellar below their building when a bomb hit the adjacent roadway, shattering the cellar wall. Although they were "terribly shaken", the couple escaped injury. Several days later, the Dawsons were once again sheltering in the cellar when a bomb explosion ruptured the gas and water mains. The police ordered them to relocate to the Oxford Street public bomb-shelter four hundred yards distant, to where they ran while "chunks of spent shrapnel rained down". After three hours, the police allowed them and two other married couples living in the same building to return to their residences. When they reached the building, Dorothy, her husband and the two other women remained at ground level while the other two men ascended the six flights of stairs to "see how their flats were faring". While they were in the building "a time bomb exploded and they were killed by falling walls". After these incidents the Dawsons abandoned their apartment and left London to live in a village in the countryside, where they found lodgings in an attic over the village shoe shop.

By March 1942, the Dawsons were living at Old Windsor, a village near the town of Windsor, 22 miles (35 km) west of London. They were in the 'Old Malt House', a 17th-century cottage they had purchased. Before the war ended, their cottage had the doors and windows blown out from the nearby blast of a V-2 rocket.

Brunton's husband, Ben Dawson, died on 31 October 1945 at Windsor in county Berkshire, England, aged about 60 years. Dawson's probate was valued at just under forty-eight thousand pounds, granted to his widow Dorothy Dawson.

=== Later life ===
After the death of her husband, Dorothy Dawson returned to Australia. She arrived at Sydney aboard the Orion in about April 1947.

In about 1948, Brunton was diagnosed as suffering from Parkinson's disease. Several years later, she visited Sweden seeking a cure, but gained only temporary relief. Brunton lived quietly with a companion at Bellevue Hill, and took pleasure in reading and classical music.

Dorothy Dawson (née Brunton) died on 5 June 1977 in the Sacred Heart Hospice in Darlinghurst, aged 86 years.

== Discography ==
- Dorothy Brunton & Alfred Lester (side B only) – 'The Goblin's Glide' b/w 'In Shanghai' (both songs from Shanghai) (shellac 10-inch); Columbia L-1274 (1918); accompanied by the Drury Lane Theatre Orchestra (conductor: Maurice Jacobi).
- Dorothy Brunton & Paul Dufault – 'It Was a Lover and His Lass' b/w 'Nearest and Dearest' (shellac 10-inch); Columbia 2918 (1919); recorded in New York in May 1918.^{[G]}
- Dorothy Brunton & Paul Dufault (side A only) – 'Barcarolle' (from The Tales of Hoffmann) b/w 'Keep Me in Your Heart (Till I Come Home Again)' (shellac 12-inch); Columbia 771 (December 1919); recorded in New York in May 1918.
- Dorothy Brunton – 'The Bubble' b/w 'Love's Own Kiss' (both songs from Hi Jinks) (shellac 12-inch); Columbia 772 (1920).
- Dorothy Brunton – 'In Monterey' b/w 'Down Among the Sheltering Palms' (shellac 12-inch); Columbia 773 (1920).
- Dorothy Brunton & Paul Dufault (side B only) – 'God Send You Back to Me' b/w 'Rose of My Heart' (shellac 12-inch); Columbia 774 (1920).
- Dorothy Brunton, Walter Catlett (side A only) & Ronald Squire (side B only) – 'Married Life' b/w 'Supposing' (both songs from Baby Bunting) (shellac 12-inch); Columbia F-1015 (1920); accompanied by the Shaftesbury Theatre Orchestra (conductor: Jacques Breebe).
- Davy Burnaby & Dorothy Brunton (side B only) – 'What's the Matter with 59?' b/w 'Green Grass Grew All Round' (shellac 12-inch); Columbia F-1016 (1920); accompanied by the Shaftesbury Theatre Orchestra (conductor: Jacques Breebe); recorded in London in October 1919.

== Notes ==
A.Dorothy Brunton had two older brothers: John, born at Port Said in late-April 1886 aboard the R.M.S. Garonne, and James, born in Carlton in 1888.

B.Fanny Dango was a British actress and comedienne who had a successful few years with J. C. Williamson in Australia after being brought to Melbourne in August 1907 for The Dairymaids. In Australia, she met the wealthy pastoralist and businessman Sam Mackay and retired from show business after marrying him in London in November 1910.

C.Robert Argyle Brunton, born in Scotland about 1872, was a child of John Brunton's 1870 marriage to Sarah Hotchkis. He remained in Scotland after his father travelled to Australia in 1886. Like his father, Robert Brunton worked as a theatrical scenery artist. He was employed as a scene painter for a theatrical company led by Sir Henry Irving. In 1903, he travelled to America with the company, where he remained, finding work with the Shubert Organization in New York as a scenic artist. In August 1905, he married Clara Flash at Lucas, Ohio. Brunton later worked for Oliver Morosco. Brunton began his film career as a general art director and production manager at the Ince-Triangle Studios with Thomas Ince, a pioneer of film-making in Los Angeles. In 1917 the company Paralta Plays Inc. was formed and engaged Brunton as production manager. The company constructed the Paralta Studios on 10-acres of an 80-acre tract of land north of Melrose Avenue (where it crosses Van Ness Avenue) in the Hollywood district of Los Angeles. In 1918 the company changed hands. In 1918 Brunton purchased the Paralta studios in Los Angeles and renamed it Robert Brunton Studios Inc. In 1926 Paramount Pictures purchased the United Studios complex and extensively rebuilt the facilities to form Paramount Studios.

D.When the war ended Jack Brunton had applied for permission to return to Australia via the United States for business purposes. In his letter of application, he explained that he owned and controlled two picture theatres in Melbourne, and intended to "visit Los Angeles, and meet the Independent Producers to whom I am personally known". Permission was granted in September 1919, and Brunton travelled from England to the United States of America, but remained in that country where he established himself in the motion picture business (in the process abandoning his wife in Australia). By about early 1921, Jack Brunton had begun working with his half-brother at Robert Brunton Studios in Los Angeles.

E.Benjamin Frank Dawson was born in 1885 at Port Melbourne, the son of Benjamin Dawson and Margaret (née Rhodes). He married Anna Holdenson in August 1911 at Hawthorn, Victoria. Anna was the daughter of Povl Jorgen Holdenson, the Danish Vice-Consul in Melbourne and managing director of butter manufacturers, Holdenson and Neilson Fresh Food Pty. Ltd. At the time of his marriage, Dawson was manager of Messrs. Carnegie and Sons, importers of musical instruments. The couple had a son, born in 1912. On a trip to America, Dawson met Sidney Myer who induced him to join the Myer Department Stores business. Dawson was made a director and given charge of the fourth floor of the Myer Emporium in Melbourne. His assets accumulated, and in 1927, he was reported to be holding twenty-six thousand shares in Myer Melbourne Pty. Ltd. In March 1928, Dawson and his family relocated to England, living in a lavish flat in Queen Anne's Mansions, St. James. In 1929, Dawson lost "practically the whole of his fortune" in "the Hatry crash", a financial scandal which resulted in Clarence Hatry and his associates being charged with forgery and fraud. Hatry was convicted and sent to jail for fourteen years. In 1929, Anna Dawson returned to Melbourne and initiated divorce proceedings against her husband.

F.In the morning after her marriage, Brunton sent a note of apology to the newspaper reporter, explaining that she "told a little fib, because a marriage to me meant something sacred". She added that she "didn't want our marriage to be theatrical" and "couldn't bear the thought of an audience".

G.Paul Dufault (1872 – 1930; born Wilbrod Dufault) was one of the most popular of Canada's lyric tenors; he specialised in romantic songs which formed a large part of his repertoire. Dufault made successful tours of Australia, China, Japan, the United States and Canada. He recorded prolifically in French and English for Columbia, His Master's Voice, Starr, and for Edison on cylinders as well as Diamond Discs.
