= Paul Dufault =

Canadian singer

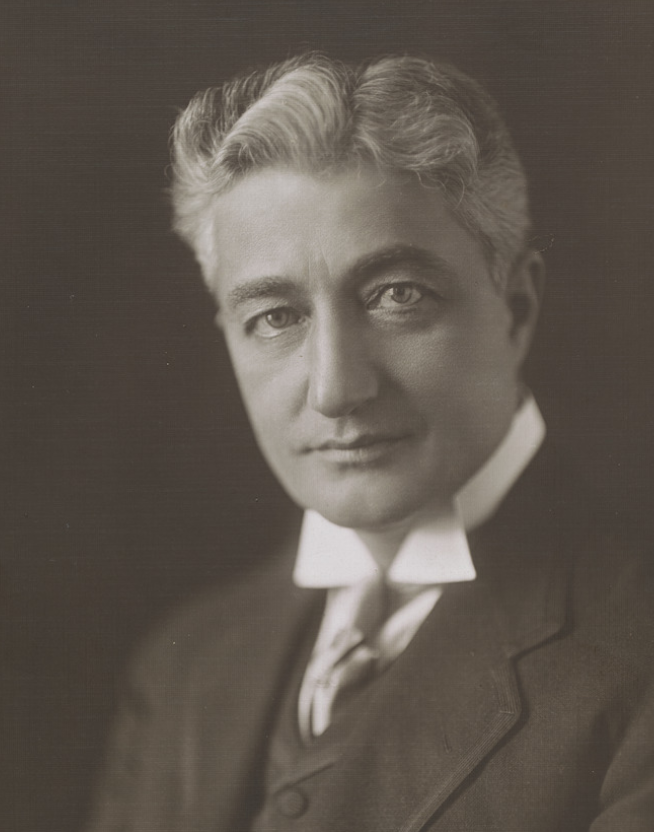

Paul Dufault, born Eusèbe Pantaléon Cyprien Wilbrod Dufault (1872–1930), was a Canadian lyrical tenor.

== History ==
Dufault was born 10 December 1872 in Sainte-Hélène-de-Bagot, Quebec.

Dufault studied singing in Montreal, Boston and Worcester, Massachusetts, and studied at the Séminaire de Nicolet, and with Hector Dupeyron of the Paris Opera. He began his professional career as a singer in 1887 under the name Paul Dufault and made a name for himself primarily as a lieder and oratorio singer.

He died 20 June 1930 in Sainte-Hélène-de-Bagot.

== Touring ==
Between 1906 and about 1920 Default made regular concert tours through Canada, often to regional areas, and had appearances in Australia, New Zealand, China and Japan. He toured Australia three times and was described glowingly as the "golden voiced Canadian tenor", and employed local musicians in the countries he toured.

In 1910 he had two appearances at Carnegie Hall with the New York Philharmonic under the direction of Gustav Mahler, and he lived and worked in New York for several years.

Dufault was also known for his tours with American soprano, Eleanora de Cisneros.

Dufault's repertoire included classical French arias as well as French and English songs by composers such as Théodore Botrel, Charles Gounod and Gustave Goublier, but also songs by Francesco Paolo Tosti.

== Recordings ==
Between 1911 and 1921 he made recordings for the Columbia Phonograph, Edison Records, Victor and Starr Records labels. In May 1918 in New York, he recorded a number of songs with Australian actress and singer, Dorothy Brunton.

Many of his recordings are held in the University of California, Santa Barbara Library Audio Cylinder Archive.

== Honors ==
In Canada, two lakes – one in Ontario and one in Manitoba – were named after Dufault and a street in Montreal has also borne his name since 1972.
