= Tons of Money (play) =

- Original language: English
- Characters: Sprules; Simpson; Benita Mullett; Louise Allington; Aubrey Allington; Giles; James Chesterman; Jean Everard; Henry; George Maitland

Premiere
- Date: 13 April 1922
- Place: Shaftesbury Theatre, London
- Directed by: E. Holman Clark

Yvonne Arnaud and Ralph Lynn as the Allingtons in the original 1922 production

Tons of Money is a farce by the British writers Will Evans and Arthur Valentine. It was co-produced by Tom Walls and Leslie Henson. In the story of the play, a hard-up inventor pretends to be his cousin, in order to escape the clutches of his creditors.

== First production ==
Aubrey in Mexican disguise

Henry (Tom Walls) meets the real cousin.

Giles, the glum gardener (Willie Warde)

The play was produced by Tom Walls and Leslie Henson. It was first given at the Shaftesbury Theatre, London, on 13 April 1922, directed by E. Holman Clark.

=== Original cast ===
- Sprules, butler – George Barrett
- Simpson, parlourmaid – Ena Mason
- Benita Mullett – Mary Brough
- Louise Allington – Yvonne Arnaud
- Aubrey Henry Maitland Allington – Ralph Lynn
- Giles, gardener – Willie Warde
- James Chesterman, solicitor – J. Robertson Hare
- Jean Everard – Madge Saunders
- Henry – Tom Walls
- George Maitland – Sidney Lynn

Source: Who's Who in the Theatre.

It ran for 737 performances, at the Shaftesbury and the Aldwych. It was, at the time, only the fourth non-musical show to surpass 700 performances in a West End run. (Note: The other three were the farce The Private Secretary; a melodrama, Seven Days' Leave; and a romantic comedy, Peg o' My Heart.)

== Plot ==
Aubrey Allington is a hopelessly impractical inventor who is deep in debt. When he inherits a large sum from a relation in Mexico he stands to see none of it because his creditors would claim it all. His resourceful wife comes up with a solution: the cousin to whom the legacy reverts on Aubrey's death is believed to be dead. Aubrey's supposed death in an explosion in his laboratory enables him to come to life again masquerading as the cousin from Mexico, able to collect the full legacy. He reappears in sombrero and extravagantly Mexican guise. Unfortunately for the conspirators, the cousin's long-estranged wife claims Aubrey as her own, and a further fake suicide – this time by drowning – ensues so that Aubrey can escape her. Meanwhile, Sprules, the family butler, has got wind of the plot, and seeks to cash in by arranging for his brother to impersonate the Mexican cousin. The impostor's arrival necessitates a further reincarnation of Aubrey, this time as the new curate of a nearby parish. He tries to come to an agreement with the pretended Mexican, but they are interrupted by the arrival of the very-much-alive real cousin. In the end it turns out that there is no legacy to be had: the money has been annexed by the Mexican Revolutionary Committee.

== Revivals and adaptations ==
Alan Ayckbourn updated and directed the play in 1986 in a revival by the National Theatre starring Polly Adams and Simon Cadell, with Michael Gambon as Sprules.

The play was adapted for the cinema on three occasions. A 1924 silent film Tons of Money was directed by Frank Hall Crane and starred Leslie Henson. A 1930 sound version Tons of Money directed by Tom Walls starred many of the Aldwych regulars. In 1934 a French film I Have an Idea was released, starring Raimu and Simone Deguyse. The BBC has broadcast two adaptations of the play for television. In 1947 Winifred Shotter and Desmond Walter-Ellis starred as the Allingtons. Eleanor Summerfield and Frankie Howerd were the leads in a 1954 television version.

Tons of Money was adapted into a musical in Australia in 1924 by Vaiben Louis and Willy Redstone and the producer Hugh J. Ward. The Australian production also featured a number by Australian composer Jack Lumsdaine.

== Notes, references and sources ==
=== Sources ===
- Parker, John, ed. (1925). Who's Who in the Theatre (fifth ed.). London: Sir Isaac Pitman and Sons. OCLC 10013159.
- Trussler, Simon (2000). The Cambridge Illustrated History of British Theatre. Cambridge University Press. ISBN 978-0-521-41913-0.
