= Hugh J. Ward =

American actor

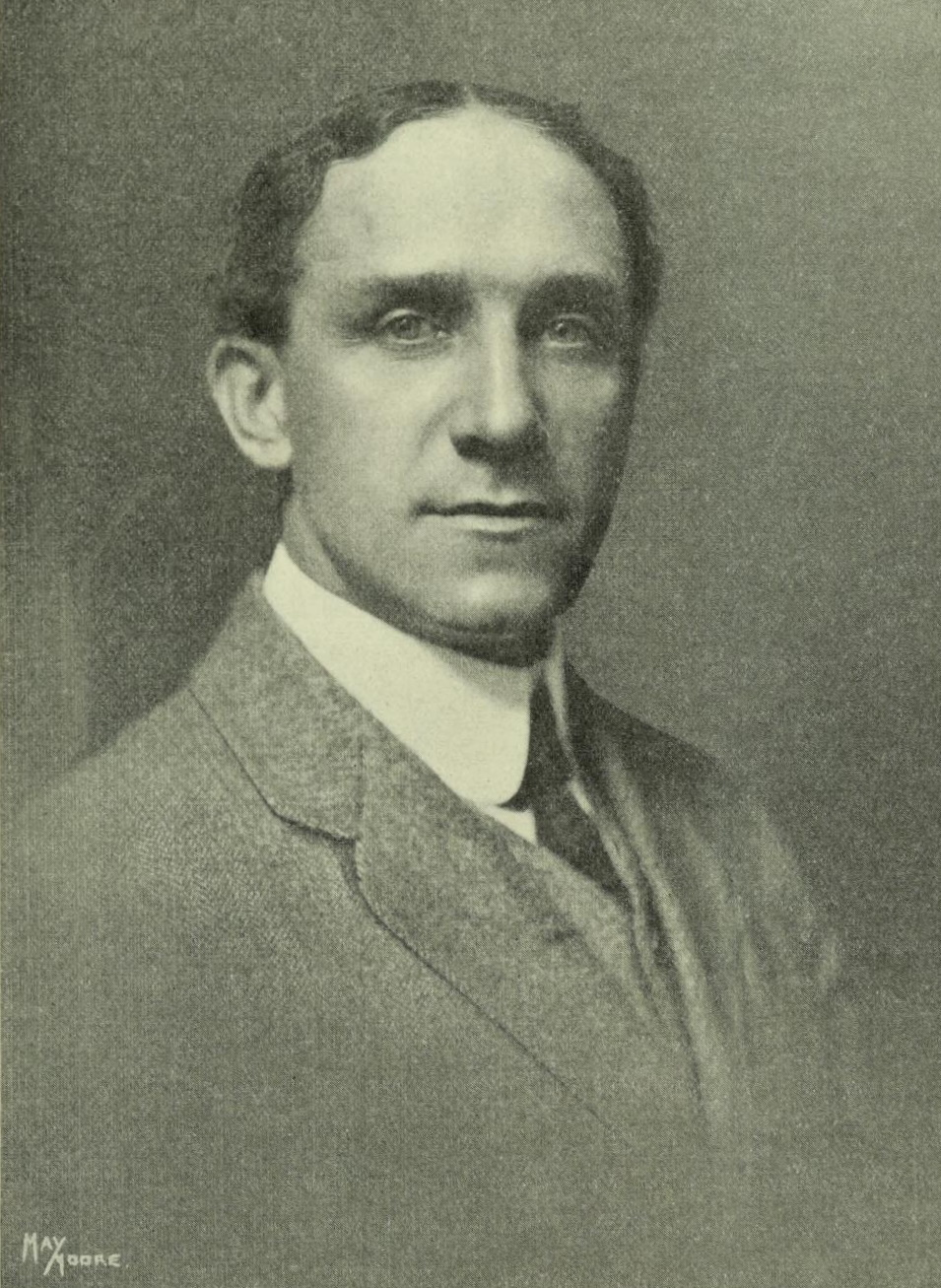
- Portrait of Hugh J. Ward (published in 1910).
- Born: Hugh Joseph Ward; 24 June 1871; Philadelphia, Pennsylvania, United States
- Died: 21 April 1941 (aged 69); Potts Point, New South Wales, Australia
- Spouse: Mary Grace Miller

Hugh Joseph Ward (24 June 1871 – 21 April 1941) was an American-born stage actor who had a substantial career in Australia as a comic actor, dancer, manager and theatrical impresario.

== Biography ==
Hugh J. Ward was born in Philadelphia on 24 June 1871, the son of Hugh Ward and Mary (née O'Conner). He arrived in Australia as an actor, first appearing in June 1899 at Her Majesty's Theatre, Sydney in the Hoyt – McKee company's production of A Stranger in New York, which toured extensively throughout Australia to rave reviews. The company returned to America after playing New Zealand in February 1900, all except Ward, who had been offered a contract by J. C. Williamson. He visited London in 1903, playing at Drury Lane with the Arthur Collins company, played at New York for the notorious Klaw and Erlanger, then returned to Australia in 1906. He produced a number of plays for George Willoughby. In 1909 he formed a company of his own, which toured India, Burma and China for Allan Hamilton and, reportedly, displayed a gift for publicity stunts by faking the abduction of a princess, before returning to Australia, where he is made his "last appearance on stage" on 4 March 1910, in a revival of The Man from Mexico, though Melba-like, he made another farewell appearance in The Girl from Rector's in Brisbane in March 1911.

Ward joined "The Firm" of J. C. Williamson in 1908, for whom he worked with considerable success as a managing director. On the death of Williamson in July 1913 he became chairman of directors. He announced his resignation in March 1922 to form his own management business, Hugh J. Ward Theatres. Ltd., in association with the Fuller brothers.

Hugh Ward was a notable fundraiser for patriotic causes during the First World War, and in recognition of his aid to Belgium he was made Knight of the Order of Leopold II. He became a naturalised Australian in 1922, and his obituaries report him as receiving an OBE, though he had hoped for a knighthood, but this is hard to verify and must surely be fictitious. He retired from the theatre in September 1926, but maintained a high public profile until shortly before his death of heart failure in 1941.

Ward was notable as an organizer of activities in conjunction with the Sydney sesquicentenary celebrations in 1938.

== Tributes ==
On his death E. J. Tait, managing director of J. C. Williamson, Ltd., paid tribute to him as "... 100 per cent, in earnest all through his career, and never appeared in a "flop", except The Emerald Isle .... The longer I knew him, the more I admired his strength and great will-power. The theatre will sadly miss him." John Fuller said of Ward "... he was a gentleman in every respect, and a noteworthy judge of things theatrical. He had associated himself with everything that was cultural and beautiful in the life of this country. He had been a great and noble citizen."

The theatre critic of the Sydney Morning Herald, calling him a "picturesque theatrical personality" praised his public-spiritedness and dedication to his craft.

== Performances ==
He was a clever and agile dancer, described as an early Fred Astaire. His "Scarecrow Dance" (perhaps invented by Johnny Coleman) received favorable reviews in New York and London, as well as in Sydney. Though appearing in many musicals, critics never mentioned his singing ability, though he must have been an adequate basso as he played in at least one Gilbert and Sullivan opera. Grace Palotta (1870 – 21 February 1959) was the leading lady in most of these productions.

He achieved great success in a wide variety of comic characters:

- Baron Sands, a "giddy old Lothario" in A Stranger in New York – "the best the local stage has seen for many a day" 1899
- Ben Gay, an octogenarian dandy, in "A Trip to Chinatown" 1899
- J. Offenbach Gaggs, in The Casino Girl, a musical comedy by Harry B. Smith and Ludwig Engländer 1901
- The evil Baron, in Little Red Riding Hood (pantomime) 1900
- Gilfain (adb has Cyrus Gilfillan), the millionaire in Florodora by Leslie Stuart and Owen Hall 1901
- Sir Bingo Preston, the British Consul in A Runaway Girl by Seymour Hicks and Harry Nicholls, composer Ivan Caryll 1902
- Sir Guy of Gisborne in Robin Hood by Reginald De Koven, composer Harry B. Smith 1902
- The Foreman in Trial by Jury by Gilbert and Sullivan 1902
- Tony Mostano, the vaquero in Arizona 1903
- Benjamin Fitzhugh in The Man from Mexico by Henry A. Du Souchet 1906
- Samuel Hopkinson in Mr. Hopkinson by Richard Claude Carton 1907
- Lord Cyril Garston, a vacuous young aristocrat, in The New Clown by Harry M. Paull 1907
- Andrew Fullalove, the old gentleman hypnotised into a boxing tournament, in The Talk of the Town by Eille Norwood 1907
- Benjamin Bachelor in A Bachelor's Honeymoon by John Stapleton 1910
- Professor Audrey Maboon in the risqué The Girl from Rector's, "... a spicy salad with very little dressing" by Paul M. Potter 1911

Other performances may have included (no dates found):

- Rip, in the operetta Rip Van Winkle by Robert Planquette
- Mathias, the burgomaster, in The Bells by Leopold David Lewis
- Caleb Plummer, the poor old toymaker, in Dot, A Drama in Three Acts
- Rev. Robert Spalding in The Private Secretary Charles Hawtrey
- Captain Redwood in Jim the Penman by Sir Charles Lawrence Young
- Baron Stein in Diplomacy by Victorien Sardou
- Peter Amos Dunn in Niobe by Edward Paulton and Harry Paulton
- Jaikes in The Silver King by Henry Arthur Jones and Henry Herman
- Beau Farintosh? in School by Thomas William Robertson
- Eccles in Caste by Thomas William Robertson
- Sir Toby Belch in Twelfth Night by William Shakespeare
- Baron Chevrial, degenerate roué in A Parisian Romance by Octave Feuillet

== Other interests ==
Ward was a foundation member of the Millions Club on Rowe Street, Sydney and a member of the Lambs Club of New York (satirised as "actors trying to be gentlemen"). He was a regular movie-goer, an aficionado of Grand Opera and ballet, and of course the theatre, for which he maintained a lifelong interest.

He was a director of the Sydney Hospital and a contributor to various organizations.

== Family ==
Ward married (Mary) Grace Miller ( – ) in Pittsburgh, Pennsylvania, on 30 June 1897; they had two sons:

- Hugh F. Ward (c. 21 January 1901 – 1955)
- Melbourne "Mel" Ward (1903 – 6 October 1966) married Halley Kate Foster on 27 October 1931. Mel was a noted naturalist.

They had a home at Potts Point, Sydney. Grace Miller (as she was professionally known), or Grace Miller-Ward, was a fine soprano and a successful singing teacher whose pupils included Gladys Moncrieff, Dorothy Brunton, Gracie Lavers, Cecil Bradley, Gladys Cole and Bessie Storey.

== Archive ==
The State Library of New South Wales has a collection of Ward artefacts. See Ward family papers 1831–1983
