= 1952 in literature =

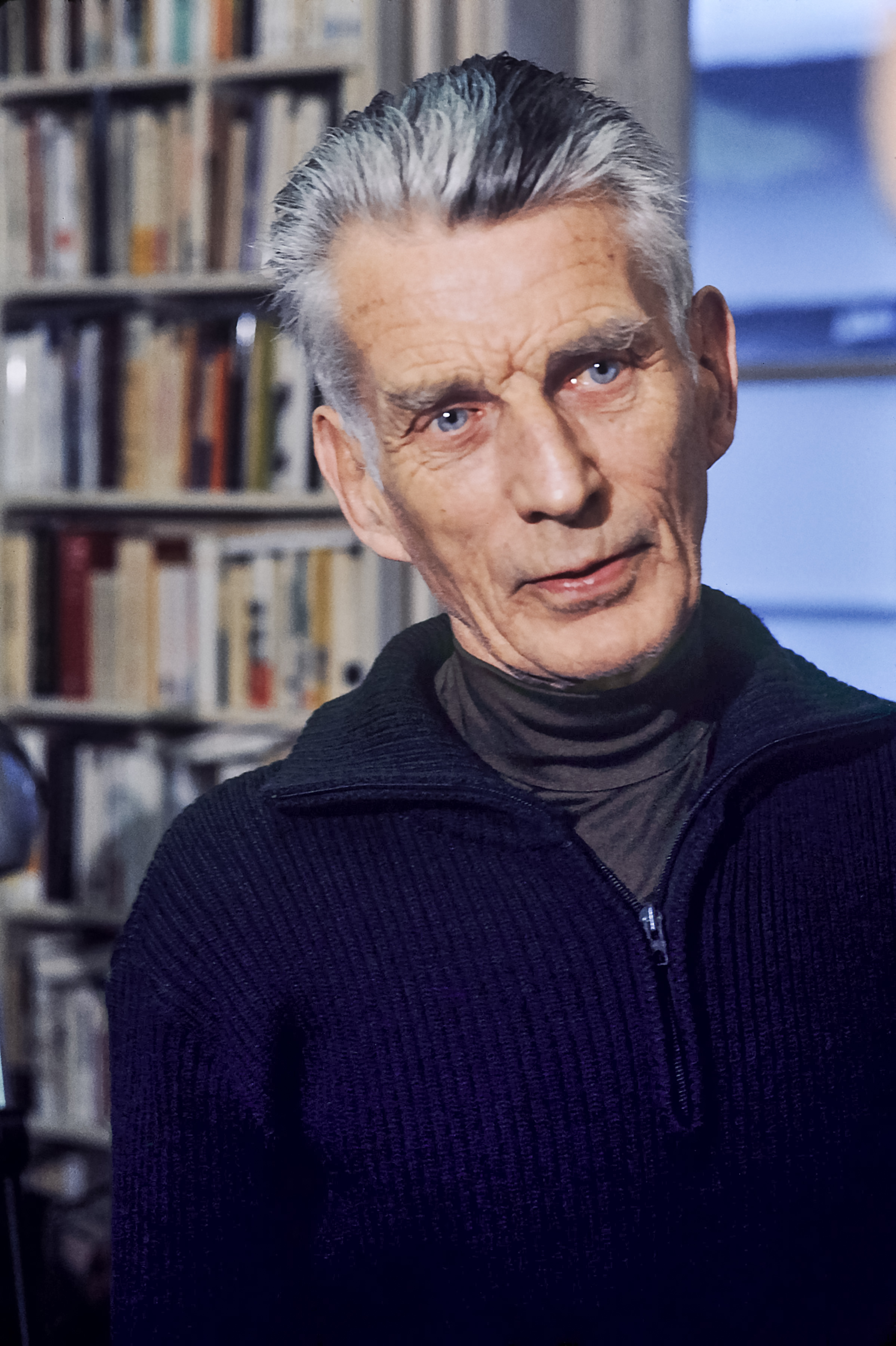
Samuel Beckett in 1977

This article contains information about the literary events and publications of 1952.

== Events ==
- February – The historical periodical Past & Present is launched in Oxford, England.
- February 29 – Derek J. de Solla Price reveals his discovery of a lost medieval scientific work entitled Equatorie of the Planetis, initially attributed to Geoffrey Chaucer, in the Times Literary Supplement.
- March 3 – J. L. Carr takes over as Headmaster of Highfields Primary School, Kettering, which will later feature in his novel The Harpole Report.
- May – The works of André Gide are placed on the Catholic Church's Index of Forbidden Books by Pope Pius XII.
- July 10 – The first issue of Mad appears, edited by Harvey Kurtzman and published by William M. Gaines' EC Comics.
- August 12 – The Night of the Murdered Poets brings the execution of 13 Soviet Jews in Lubyanka Prison, Moscow, including several writers.
- September 6 – The Universal Copyright Convention is adopted at Geneva.
- October 17 – Samuel Beckett's play Waiting For Godot is published in Paris as En attendant Godot by Les Éditions de Minuit.
- October 28 – E. E. Cummings delivers the first of his Charles Eliot Norton lectures at Harvard University.
- November 25 – Agatha Christie's play The Mousetrap opens at the New Ambassadors Theatre, London. It will still be running as of 2021, next door at St Martin's Theatre from 1974.
- unknown dates
  - The publisher Diogenes Verlag is founded in Zürich, Switzerland, by Daniel Keel.
  - The National Library of Burma is established in Rangoon.

== New books ==
=== Fiction ===
- Margery Allingham – The Tiger in the Smoke
- Anthony Armstrong – He Was Found in the Road
- Thomas Armstrong – Adam Brunskill
- Isaac Asimov
  - The Currents of Space
  - Foundation and Empire
- H. E. Bates – Love for Lydia
- Margot Bennett – The Widow of Bath
- John Bingham – My Name Is Michael Sibley
- Christianna Brand – London Particular
- Pearl S. Buck – The Hidden Flower
- John Bude
  - Death on the Riviera
  - When the Case Was Opened
- Ivan Bunin – The Life of Arseniev
- Italo Calvino
  - The Argentine Ant (La Formica Argentina)
  - The Cloven Viscount (l visconte dimezzato, first of the Our Ancestors trilogy)
- Victor Canning – The House of the Seven Flies
- John Dickson Carr
  - The Nine Wrong Answers
  - Behind the Crimson Blind (as Carter Dickson)
- Henry Cecil – No Bail for the Judge
- Louis-Ferdinand Céline – Fable for Another Time
- Agatha Christie
  - Mrs McGinty's Dead
  - They Do It with Mirrors
  - A Daughter's a Daughter (as Mary Westmacott)
- Brian Cleeve – The Far Hills
- Branko Ćopić – Prolom (The Break-out)
- Thomas B. Costain – The Silver Chalice
- A. J. Cronin – Adventures in Two Worlds
- August Derleth
  - Three Problems for Solar Pons
  - Night's Yawning Peal: A Ghostly Company (as editor)
- David F. Dodge – To Catch a Thief
- Jean Dutourd – The Best Butter
- Ralph Ellison – Invisible Man
- Jeffrey Farnol – Waif of the River
- Edna Ferber – Giant
- C. S. Forester – Lieutenant Hornblower
- Paul Gallico – The Small Miracle
- Anthony Gilbert – Miss Pinnegar Disappears
- Michael Gilbert – Death in Captivity
- Jean Giono – The Malediction
- Richard Gordon – Doctor in the House
- Winston Graham – Fortune Is a Woman
- Walter Greenwood – So Brief the Spring
- Edward Grierson – Reputation for a Song
- Vasily Grossman – Stalingrad («Сталингра́д»)
- Han Suyin – A Many-Splendoured Thing
- Robert A. Heinlein – The Rolling Stones
- Ernest Hemingway – The Old Man and the Sea
- Willem Frederik Hermans – Het behouden huis (The House of Refuge or An Untouched House, novella)
- Patricia Highsmith – The Price of Salt (as Claire Morgan)
- Dorothy B. Hughes – The Davidian Report
- Hammond Innes – Campbell's Kingdom
- Michael Innes – A Private View
- Ernst Jünger – Visit to Godenholm
- Frances Parkinson Keyes – Steamboat Gothic
- David H. Keller – Tales from Underwood
- Arthur Koestler – Arrow in the Blue
- Halldór Laxness – Gerpla
- Doris Lessing – Martha Quest
- E. C. R. Lorac
  - Crossed Skis
  - The Dog It Was That Died
  - Murder in the Mill-Race
- Edgar Lustgarten – Game for Three Losers
- Ross Macdonald – The Ivory Grin
- Compton Mackenzie – The Rival Monster
- Bernard Malamud – The Natural
- Wolf Mankowitz – Make Me an Offer
- Ana Maria Matute – Fiesta al noroeste
- Gladys Mitchell – The Echoing Strangers
- Harry Mulisch – Archibald Strohalm
- C. L. Moore – Judgment Night (science fiction short stories)
- R. K. Narayan – The Financial Expert
- Patrick O'Brian – Testimonies
- Flannery O'Connor – Wise Blood
- Vin Packer – Spring Fire
- Anthony Powell – A Buyer's Market
- Maurice Procter – Rich Is the Treasure
- John Pudney – The Net
- Barbara Pym – Excellent Women
- Ellery Queen – The King is Dead
- Lucien Rebatet – Les Deux étendards
- John Rhode – Death in Wellington Road
- Anne Scott-James – In the Mink
- Charles Shaw – Heaven Knows, Mr. Allison
- John Steinbeck – East of Eden
- Rex Stout
  - Triple Jeopardy
  - Prisoner's Base
- Noel Streatfeild – Aunt Clara
- A. C. Swinburne (died 1909) – Lesbia Brandon (completed c.1868)
- Edith Templeton – The Island of Desire
- Jim Thompson – The Killer Inside Me
- Agnes Sligh Turnbull – The Gown of Glory
- Amos Tutuola – The Palm-Wine Drunkard
- Sachchidananda Vatsyayan (Agyeya) – Nadi ke dweep (Islands in the stream)
- Vercors – Les Animaux dénaturés
- Arved Viirlaid – Ristideta hauad (Graves Without Crosses)
- Kurt Vonnegut – Player Piano
- Henry Wade – Be Kind to the Killer
- Evelyn Waugh – Men at Arms
- Hillary Waugh – Last Seen Wearing...
- Antonia White – The Sugar House
- Vaughan Wilkins – A King Reluctant
- Angus Wilson – Hemlock and After
- Frank Yerby – The Saracen Blade

=== Children and young people ===
- Rev. W. Awdry – Toby the Tram Engine (seventh in The Railway Series of 42 books by him and his son Christopher Awdry)
- Enid Blyton – Noddy and Big Ears
- Bruce Carter – The Perilous Descent (Into a Strange Lost World)
- Alice Dalgliesh – The Bears on Hemlock Mountain
- Dorothy Edwards – My Naughty Little Sister. Stories from "Listen With Mother"
- Rumer Godden – Mouse House
- C. S. Lewis – The Voyage of the Dawn Treader
- Eloise Jarvis McGraw – Moccasin Trail
- Farley Mowat – People of the Deer
- Mary Norton – The Borrowers (first in the eponymous series of 6 books)
- Rhoda Power – Redcap Runs Away
- William Matthew Scott – The Cherrys of River House (first in The Cherrys series of 14 books)
- Louis Slobodkin – The Space Ship Under the Apple Tree
- Geoffrey Trease – The Crown of Violet (also Web of Traitors)
- E. B. White – Charlotte's Web

=== Drama ===
- Rodney Ackland – The Pink Room
- Jean Anouilh
  - The Lark (L'Alouette)
  - The Waltz of the Toreadors (La Valse des toréadors)
- Samuel Beckett - Waiting for Godot
- Jacinto Benavente – Ha llegado Don Juan
- Alice Childress – Gold Through the Trees
- Agatha Christie – The Mousetrap
- John Clements – The Happy Marriage
- Noël Coward – Quadrille
- Constance Cox – Lord Arthur Savile's Crime
- Robertson Davies – A Masque of Aesop
- Henry de Montherlant – La Ville dont le prince est un enfant (The City Whose Prince is a Child; first performance in first published version)
- Friedrich Dürrenmatt – The Marriage of Mr. Mississippi (Die Ehe des Herrn Mississippi, first performance)
- Janet Green – Murder Mistaken
- Michael Clayton Hutton – Dead Secret
- Peter Jones – Sweet Madness
- Joseph Kramm – The Shrike
- Charles Langbridge Morgan – The River Line
- Eric Linklater – The Mortimer Touch
- Roger MacDougall – Escapade
- Raymond Massey – Hanging Judge
- Charles Morgan – The River Line
- Ralph Peterson – The Square Ring
- J. B. Priestley and Jacquetta Hawkes – Dragon's Mouth
- Terence Rattigan – The Deep Blue Sea
- Dodie Smith – Letter from Paris
- Ben Travers – Wild Horses
- Gerald Verner – Meet Mr. Callaghan
- John Van Druten – I've Got Sixpence
- Arthur Watkyn – The Moonraker

=== Poetry ===
- Paul Celan – Poppy and Memory (German: Mohn und Gedächtnis)
- David Jones – The Anathemata: fragments of an attempted writing
- Gabriela Mistral – Los sonetos de la muerte y otros poemas elegíacos
- Sean O Riordain – Eireaball Spideoige

=== Non-fiction ===
- Roland Bainton – The Reformation of the Sixteenth Century
- John Bowlby – Maternal Care and Mental Health
- L. Sprague de Camp and Willy Ley – Lands Beyond
- Dorothy Day – The Long Loneliness
- Lawrence Gowing – Vermeer
- Heinrich Harrer – Sieben Jahre in Tibet. Mein Leben am Hofe des Dalai Lama (Seven Years in Tibet, 1954)
- Aldous Huxley
  - The Devils of Loudun
  - Tomorrow and Tomorrow and Tomorrow
- Shepherd Mead – How to Succeed in Business Without Really Trying
- Maurice Nicoll – Psychological Commentaries on the Teachings of G. I. Gurdjieff and P. D. Ouspensky
- Norman Vincent Peale – The Power of Positive Thinking
- Gwen Raverat – Period Piece
- P. R. Reid – The Colditz Story
- Jean-Paul Sartre – Saint Genet, comédien et martyr
- Pierre Schaeffer – In Search of a Concrete Music (À la Recherche d'une Musique Concrète)
- F. Sherwood Taylor – The Alchemists
- Paul Tillich – Courage To Be
- Immanuel Velikovsky – Ages in Chaos
- J. M. Wallace-Hadrill – The Barbarian West, 400–1000
- Raymond Williams – Drama from Ibsen to Eliot

== Births ==
- January 4 – Michele Wallace, American feminist author
- January 12 – Walter Mosley, American novelist
- January 21 – Louis Menand, American author and academic
- February 10 – Gail Rebuck, English publisher
- February 19
  - Ryū Murakami (村上 龍), Japanese novelist, essayist and filmmaker
  - Amy Tan, American novelist
- February 29 – Tim Powers, American fantasy author
- March 5 – Robin Hobb (Margaret Astrid Lindholm Ogden, Megan Lindholm), American fantasy author
- March 7 – William Boyd, Gold Coast-born Scottish novelist and screenwriter
- March 11 – Douglas Adams, English science fiction author (died 2001)
- March 13 – Ágnes Rapai, Hungarian poet, writer and translator
- March 23 – Kim Stanley Robinson, American science fiction author
- March 26 – T. A. Barron, American novelist
- May 5 – Hafsat Abdulwaheed, Nigerian author and poet
- May 31 – Carole Achache, French writer, photographer and actress (died 2016)
- June 4 – Dambudzo Marechera, Zimbabwean writer (died 1987)
- June 7 – Orhan Pamuk, Turkish novelist and Nobel laureate
- June 20
  - Vince Gotera, American poet and critic
  - Vikram Seth, Indian novelist
- June 29 – Breece D'J Pancake (Breece Dexter Pancake), American short story writer (suicide 1979)
- July 3 – Rohinton Mistry, Indian-born Canadian novelist
- July 6 – Hilary Mantel, English novelist (died 2022)
- July 10 – Candice F. Ransom, American children's and young-adult author
- July 18 – Per Petterson, Norwegian novelist
- August 28 – Rita Dove, American poet
- September 29 - Pete Hautman, American young-adult novelist
- October 5 – Clive Barker, British writer
- October 18 – Bảo Ninh, Vietnamese author
- November 15 – Rick Atkinson, American journalist, historian and author
- November 21 – Pedro Lemebel, Chilean novelist
- December 19 – Sean O'Brien, English poet
- December 22 – Mick Inkpen, English children's writer and illustrator
- December 28 – Hemant Shesh, Indian Hindi writer

== Deaths ==
- January 22 – Roger Vitrac, French poet and dramatist (born 1899)
- January 26 – Lodewijk van Deyssel, Dutch novelist (born 1864)
- January 28 – Nicolae Constantin Batzaria, Ottoman-born Romanian humorist, novelist, editor, and journalist (spinal cancer, born 1874)
- February 7 – Norman Douglas, Austrian-born Scottish novelist (born 1868)
- February 13 – Josephine Tey (Elizabeth MacKintosh), Scottish crime novelist (born 1896)
- February 19 – Knut Hamsun, Norwegian novelist and Nobel laureate (born 1859)
- March 1
  - Mariano Azuela, Mexican novelist, dramatist and critic (born 1873)
  - Masao Kume (久米 正雄), Japanese playwright, novelist and haiku poet (born 1891)
- March 27 – Ioan A. Bassarabescu, Romanian short story writer and politician (born 1870)
- April 1 – Ferenc Molnár (Ferenc Neumann), Hungarian dramatist and novelist (born 1878)
- April 30 – Alexandru Tzigara-Samurcaș – Romanian art historian, ethnographer and journalist (born 1872)
- May 17 – Paul Bujor, Romanian politician, zoologist and short story writer (born 1862)
- May 26 – Eugene Jolas, American/French writer, literary translator and critic (born 1894)
- June 1 – John Dewey, American philosopher and psychologist (born 1859)
- July 1 – A. S. W. Rosenbach, American book collector (born 1876)
- July 8 – August Alle, Estonian writer (born 1890)
- August 9 – Jeffery Farnol, English historical novelist (born 1878)
- August 22 – H. J. Massingham, English countryside writer (born 1888)
- September 26 – George Santayana, Spanish philosopher, poet and novelist writing in English (born 1863)
- October 4 – Keith Murdoch, Australian journalist (born 1885)
- October 6 – Teffi (Nadezhda Alexandrovna Buchinskaya), Russian humorist (born 1872)
- November 3 – Louis Verneuil, French playwright (suicide, born 1893)
- November 4 – Gilbert Frankau, English novelist (born 1884)
- November 13 – Margaret Wise Brown, American children's author (embolism, born 1910)
- November 16 – Charles Maurras, French poet and critic (born 1868)
- November 18 – Paul Éluard, French surrealist poet (heart attack, born 1895)
- November 23 – Aaro Hellaakoski, Finnish poet (born 1893)
- December 6 – Cicely Hamilton, English dramatist and suffragist (born 1872)

== Awards ==
- Carnegie Medal for children's literature: Mary Norton, The Borrowers
- Friedenspreis des Deutschen Buchhandels: Romano Guardini
- Frost Medal: Carl Sandburg
- James Tait Black Memorial Prize for fiction: Evelyn Waugh, Men at Arms
- James Tait Black Memorial Prize for biography: G. M. Young, Stanley Baldwin
- National Book Award: James Jones, From Here to Eternity.
- Newbery Medal for children's literature: Eleanor Estes, Ginger Pye
- Newdigate prize: Donald Hall
- Nobel Prize for Literature: François Mauriac
- Premio Nadal: María Medio Estrada, Nosotros, los Rivero
- Pulitzer Prize for Drama: Joseph Kramm, The Shrike
- Pulitzer Prize for Fiction: Herman Wouk – The Caine Mutiny
- Pulitzer Prize for Poetry: Marianne Moore, Collected Poems
- King's Gold Medal for Poetry: Andrew Young
- National Book Award for Fiction: James Jones – From Here to Eternity
