= 1944 in literature =

This article contains information about the literary events and publications of 1944.

== Events ==
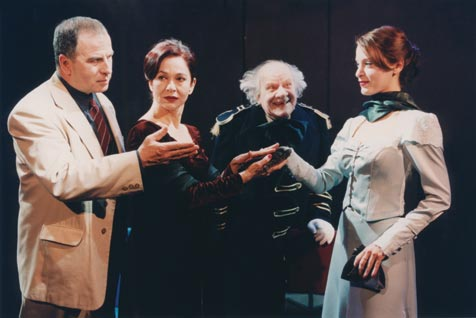
Kostas Triantafyllopoulos (Garcin), Smaragda Smyrnaiou (Inès), Giorgos Velentzas (Valet) and Maria Protopappa (Estelle) in a 2002 stage production of No Exit in Athens, Greece

- February 6 – The première of Jean Anouilh's tragedy Antigone takes place at the Théâtre de l'Atelier in Nazi-occupied Paris.
- March 19 – The première of Pablo Picasso's play Desire Caught by the Tail (Le Désir attrapé par la queue) is a private reading in Paris by the author that includes Simone de Beauvoir, Jean-Paul Sartre, Valentine Hugo and Raymond Queneau, directed by Albert Camus.
- May – The première of Jean-Paul Sartre's existentialist drama No Exit (Huis clos) is held at the Théâtre du Vieux-Colombier in Nazi-occupied Paris.
- June 1 and 5 – The first and (modified) second lines respectively of Paul Verlaine's 1866 poem Chanson d'automne ("Les sanglots longs des violons de l'automne / Bercent mon cœur d'une langueur monotone") are broadcast by the Allies over BBC Radio Londres among coded messages to the French Resistance to prepare for the D-Day landings (second broadcast at 22:15 local time).
- June
  - D-Day landings and Invasion of Normandy: The English soldier-poet Keith Douglas is killed; William Golding commands Landing Craft Tank (Rocket) 460 at Gold Beach; Vernon Scannell (as John Bain) experiences the incident that gives rise to the poem "Walking Wounded" (1965) and is wounded; J. D. Salinger, having landed on Utah Beach, works on an early version of The Catcher in the Rye during lulls in the fighting; Dennis B. Wilson writes the poem that appears as Elegy of a Common Soldier in 2012; Kingsley Amis and John Wyndham serve as signallers; Alexander Baron's experiences of the invasion form the basis of his novel From the City, From the Plough (1948).
  - The final edition of the Breton nationalist newspaper L'Heure Bretonne is published.
- August – With the Liberation of Paris, Jean Genet's novel Notre Dame des Fleurs (1943) can begin to circulate openly.
- September 14 – Laurence Olivier takes the title rôle in the production of Richard III that opens at The Old Vic in London.
- October
  - The contents of the Załuski Library are destroyed during the planned destruction of Warsaw by its Nazi occupiers.
  - The teenage Günter Grass, having volunteered for active service, is drafted into the Waffen-SS.
- October 2
  - After a few months' internment at Drancy and Birkenau, Benjamin Fondane is one of 700 prisoners put to death in the gas chamber – the last such killings before Birkenau is evacuated. Upon selection, Fondane is heard joking about the irony of his misfortune.
  - Dylan Thomas is to be best man at the wedding of a friend and fellow Welsh poet, Vernon Watkins, in London, but fails to turn up.
- November 9 – Collaborationist Georges Suarez becomes the first journalist executed during the épuration légale in France.
- November 22 – Laurence Olivier's film of Henry V is released in the UK, and is the first film of a Shakespeare play to be produced in colour.
- November 23 – Arthur Miller's play The Man Who Had All the Luck (written in 1940) has its Broadway première at the Forrest Theatre in New York City, but runs for only four performances.
- December 26 – Tennessee Williams' semi-autobiographical "memory play" The Glass Menagerie, adapted from a short story, is premièred at the Civic Theatre in Chicago.
- undated
  - The English actor-manager Geoffrey Kendal arrives in India for the first time with the Entertainments National Service Association, touring Patrick Hamilton's drama Gaslight; from 1947 Kendal's touring repertory company "Shakespeareana" will perform Shakespeare in towns and villages across India for some decades.
  - George Orwell's critical essay "Benefit of Clergy: Some Notes on Salvador Dalí" is printed in this year's issue of the British annual miscellany The Saturday Book but the publisher (Hutchinson) subsequently decides that it must be suppressed on grounds of obscenity and it is accordingly physically cut out of each copy.

== New books ==
=== Fiction ===
- Samuel Hopkins Adams – Canal Town
- Jorge Amado – Terras do Sem Fim (The Violent Land)
- Esther Averill – The Cat Club
- Vaikom Muhammad Basheer – Balyakalasakhi
- H. E. Bates – Fair Stood the Wind for France
- Saul Bellow – Dangling Man
- Jorge Luis Borges – Ficciones
- Caryl Brahms and S. J. Simon – No Nightingales
- Christianna Brand – Green for Danger
- John Brophy – Target Island
- John Bude – Death in White Pyjamas
- John Dickson Carr
  - Till Death Do Us Part
  - He Wouldn't Kill Patience (as Carter Dickson)
- Joyce Cary – The Horse's Mouth
- Louis-Ferdinand Céline – Guignol's Band
- Peter Cheyney
  - The Dark Street
  - They Never Say When
- Agatha Christie
  - Death Comes as the End
  - Towards Zero
  - Absent in the Spring (as Mary Westmacott)
- Colette – Gigi
- J.J. Connington – Jack-in-the-Box
- Edmund Crispin – The Case of the Gilded Fly
- A. J. Cronin – The Green Years
- Esther Forbes – Johnny Tremain
- Anthony Gilbert – The Scarlet Button
- Walter Greenwood – Something in My Heart
- L. P. Hartley – The Shrimp and the Anemone
- John Hersey – A Bell for Adano
- Georgette Heyer – Friday's Child
- Dorothy B. Hughes – The Delicate Ape
- Margaret Irwin – Young Bess
- Charles R. Jackson – The Lost Weekend
- Pamela Hansford Johnson – The Trojan Brothers
- Kalki Krishnamurthy – Sivagamiyin Sapatham (சிவகாமியின் சபதம், The Vow of Sivagami)
- Pär Lagerkvist – Dvärgen
- Margaret Landon – Anna and the King of Siam (semi-fictionalised biography, basis for 1951 musical The King and I)
- Anne Morrow Lindbergh – The Steep Ascent
- E. C. R. Lorac
  - Checkmate to Murder
  - Fell Murder
- H. P. Lovecraft – Marginalia
- Curzio Malaparte – Kaputt
- W. Somerset Maugham – The Razor's Edge
- Oscar Micheaux – The Case of Mrs. Wingate
- Gladys Mitchell – My Father Sleeps
- Alberto Moravia – Agostino (Two Adolescents)
- Gunnar Myrdal – An American Dilemma
- Anaïs Nin – Under a Glass Bell
- Ernest Raymond – For Them That Trespass
- Rafael Sabatini – King in Prussia
- Anna Seghers
  - Transit
  - "Der Ausflug der toten Mädchen" (The Excursion of the Dead Girls, short story)
- Anya Seton – Dragonwyck
- Clark Ashton Smith – Lost Worlds
- Eleanor Smith – Magic Lantern
- Howard Spring – Hard Facts
- Philip Van Doren Stern – The Greatest Gift (first trade publication)
- Rex Stout – Not Quite Dead Enough
- Cecil Street – Death Invades the Meeting
- Phoebe Atwood Taylor (as Alice Tilton) – Dead Ernest
- Donald Wandrei – The Eye and the Finger
- Henry S. Whitehead – Jumbee and Other Uncanny Tales
- Martin Wickremasinghe – Gamperaliya
- Vaughan Wilkins – Being Met Together
- Valentine Williams – Courier to Marrakesh
- Kathleen Winsor – Forever Amber

=== Children and young people ===
- Esther Averill – The Cat Club
- Enid Blyton – The Island of Adventure
- Robert Bright – Georgie
- Alice Dalgliesh – The Silver Pencil
- Eleanor Estes – The Hundred Dresses
- Pipaluk Freuchen – Ivik, den faderløse (translated as Eskimo Boy)
- Eric Linklater – The Wind on the Moon
- Feodor Rojankovsky – The Tall Book of Nursery Tales
- Margery Sharp – Cluny Brown
- Tasha Tudor – Mother Goose

=== Drama ===
- Jean Anouilh – Antigone
- Reginald Beckwith – A Soldier for Christmas
- Ugo Betti – Corruzione al Palazzo di giustizia (Corruption in the Palace of Justice, written)
- Bertolt Brecht – The Caucasian Chalk Circle (Der Kaukasische Kreidekreis), written
- Mary Chase – Harvey
- Daphne du Maurier – The Years Between
- Balwant Gargi – Lohākuṭ (Blacksmith)
- Philip King – See How They Run
- Max Otto Koischwitz – Vision of Invasion (broadcast propaganda)
- Esther McCracken – No Medals
- J. B. Priestley – How Are They at Home?
- Harold Purcell – The Rest is Silence
- Terence Rattigan – Love In Idleness (rewriting of Less Than Kind)
- Lawrence Riley – Time to Kill
- Jean-Paul Sartre – No Exit (Huis Clos)
- John Van Druten – I Remember Mama
- Franz Werfel – Jacobowsky and the Colonel (Jacobowsky und der Oberst)
- Tennessee Williams – The Glass Menagerie

=== Poetry ===
- James K. Baxter – Beyond the Palisade
- Paul Éluard – Au Rendez-vous allemand (To the German Rendezvous)
- Five Young American Poets, volume 3, containing work by Eve Merriam, John Frederick Nims, Jean Garrigue, Tennessee Williams and Alejandro Carrión
- Nicholas Moore – The Glass Tower
- Francis Brett Young – The Island

=== Non-fiction ===
- Charles William Beebe – Book of Naturalists
- F. Brunea-Fox – Orașul Măcelului (City of Slaughter)
- Aleister Crowley – The Book of Thoth
- Friedrich Hayek – The Road to Serfdom
- Max Horkheimer and Theodor W. Adorno – Dialectic of Enlightenment (Dialektik der Aufklärung)
- Gunnar Myrdal – An American Dilemma
- Beverley Nichols – Verdict on India
- Karl Polanyi – The Great Transformation
- L. T. C. Rolt – Narrow Boat
- Charles Stevenson – Ethics and Language
- G. M. Trevelyan – English Social History: a survey of six centuries from Chaucer to Queen Victoria

== Births ==
- January 8 – Terry Brooks, American writer of fantasy fiction
- January 17 – Jan Guillou, Swedish author
- January 21 – Jack Abbott, American writer (suicide 2002)
- January 24 – David Gerrold, American screenwriter and novelist
- February 7 – Witi Ihimaera, New Zealand Māori writer
- February 9 – Alice Walker, American novelist and poet
- February 11 – Joy Williams, American fiction writer
- February 14
  - Carl Bernstein, American journalist
  - Alan Parker, English director and writer (died 2020)
- February 16 – Richard Ford, American novelist
- February 18 – Elizabeth Nunez, Trinidadian-born American novelist (died 2024)
- February 27
  - Ken Grimwood, American writer (died 2003)
  - Roger Scruton, English philosopher and writer (died 2020)
- April 18 – Kathy Acker, American postmodernist experimental novelist and punk poet (died 1997)
- April 25 – Mohammed ben Abdallah, Ghanaian playwright (died 2025)
- May 13 – Armistead Maupin, American novelist
- May 17 – Uldis Bērziņš, Latvian poet and translator
- May 18 – W. G. Sebald, German novelist (died 2001)
- June 5
  - John Fraser, Canadian journalist
  - Nigel Rees, English writer and broadcaster
- June 9 - Jeanne DuPrau, American writer
- July 21 – Buchi Emecheta, Nigerian-born novelist and children's writer (died 2017)
- August 10 – Barbara Erskine, English novelist
- August 18 – Paula Danziger, American young adult novelist (died 2004)
- August 19 – Bodil Malmsten, Swedish writer (died 2016)
- August 22 – Tom Leonard, Scottish dialect poet
- August 30 – Molly Ivins, American journalist (died 2007)
- September 19 – Ismet Özel, Turkish poet
- September 24 – Eavan Boland, Irish poet (died 2020)
- October 2 – Vernor Vinge, American science fiction novelist
- October 5 – Tomás de Jesús Mangual, Puerto Rican journalist (died 2011)
- November 7 – Peter Wilby, English journalist
- November 24 – Eintou Pearl Springer, Trinidadian poet
- November 28 – Rita Mae Brown, American writer and political activist
- December 1 – Tahar Ben Jelloun, French Moroccan-born novelist
- December 2 – Botho Strauß, German writer and dramatist
- December 9 – Ki Longfellow, American novelist
- December 15 – Elizabeth Arnold, English children's writer
- December 17 – Jack L. Chalker, American science fiction novelist (died 2005)
- December 21 – James Sallis, American novelist, poet and biographer (died 2026)
- unknown dates
  - Ishtiaq Ahmad, prolific Urdu-language espionage fiction writer (died 2015)
  - Margaret Busby, Ghanaian-born British publisher
  - Shena Mackay, Scottish-born novelist
  - Patrick O'Connell, Canadian poet (died 2005)

== Deaths ==
- January 6 – Ida Tarbell, American journalist (born 1857)
- January 7 – Napoleon Lapathiotis, Greek lawyer and poet (born 1888)
- January 8 – Joseph Jastrow, Polish American psychologist (born 1863)
- January 15– Armand Praviel, French poet, novelist, and journalist (born 1875)
- January 31 – Jean Giraudoux, French dramatist (born 1882)
- February – David Vogel, Hebrew poet (killed in Auschwitz concentration camp, born 1891)
- February 2 – Jane Agnes Stewart, American author, editor, and contributor to periodicals (born 1860)
- February 9 – Agnes Mary Frances Duclaux, English-born poet, biographer and novelist (born 1857)
- February 10 – Israel Joshua Singer, Yiddish novelist (born 1893)
- February 12 – Olive Custance, Lady Alfred Douglas, English poet (born 1874)
- February 23 – Augusta Peaux, Dutch poet (born 1859)
- March 5
  - Max Jacob, French poet and critic (died in internment camp, born 1876)
  - Alun Lewis, Welsh war poet (accidental shooting, born 1915)
- March 11 – Irvin S. Cobb, American writer (born 1876)
- March 28 – Stephen Leacock, English-born Canadian humorous writer and economist (born 1869)
- April 21 – Florence Trail, American educator and author (born 1854)
- May 3 – Anica Černej, Slovenian poet (in concentration camp, born 1900)
- May 12
  - Max Brand, American Western, pulp fiction and screenwriter (killed as war correspondent, born 1892)
  - Sir Arthur Quiller-Couch ("Q"), English author and critic (born 1863)
- May 16 – George Ade, American journalist and dramatist (born 1866)
- May 24 – Harold Bell Wright, American writer (born 1872)
- June – Joseph Campbell, Northern Irish poet (born 1879)
- June 9 – Keith Douglas, English war poet (killed in action, born 1920)
- June 13 – Elizabeth Wharton Drexel, American socialite and author (born 1868)
- June 16 – Marc Bloch, French historian (executed, born 1886)
- July 31 – Antoine de Saint-Exupéry, French pilot and writer (lost in aircraft, born 1900)
- August 1 – Jean Prévost, French writer, journalist and member of the Maquis (killed in ambush, born 1901)
- August 13 – Ethel Lina White, Welsh-born English crime novelist (born 1876)
- August 18 – Jacques Roumain, Haitian writer and politician (born 1907)
- August 25 – Musa Cälil, Soviet Tatar poet and resistance fighter (executed, born 1905)
- September 4 – Margery Williams, English-born American children's writer (born 1881)
- September 13 – W. Heath Robinson, English cartoonist and illustrator (born 1872)
- October 2 – Benjamin Fondane, Romanian-born French poet, playwright and critic (killed in Auschwitz concentration camp, born 1898)
- October 8 – Elsa Lindberg-Dovlette, Swedish writer of harem stories (born 1874)
- October 19 – Karel Poláček, Czech writer, humorist and journalist (born 1892)
- October 29 – Stephen Hudson (born Sydney Schiff), English novelist, translator and arts patron (born 1868)
- November 15 – Edith Durham, English travel writer (born 1863)
- December 2 – Filippo Tommaso Marinetti, Italian poet, art theorist and Futurist writer (born 1876)
- December 17 – Robert Nichols, English poet and dramatist (born 1893)
- December 30 – Romain Rolland, French author and Nobel laureate (born 1866)
- unknown dates

- Marion Foster Washburne, American author, journalist, editor, lecturer, and educator (born 1863)

== Awards ==
- Carnegie Medal for children's literature: Eric Linklater, The Wind on the Moon
- James Tait Black Memorial Prize:
  - Fiction: Forrest Reid, Young Tom
  - Biography: C. V. Wedgwood, William the Silent
- Newbery Medal for children's literature: Esther Forbes, Johnny Tremain
- Nobel Prize in Literature: Johannes V. Jensen
- Premio Nadal (first award): Carmen Laforet, Nada
- Pulitzer Prize:
  - Poetry: Stephen Vincent Benét, Western Star
  - Novel: Martin Flavin, Journey in the Dark
- Shelley Memorial Award for Poetry: E. E. Cummings
- Hugo Award:
  - Best Novella: Antoine de Saint-Exupéry, The Little Prince
