= Crook O'Lune (novel) =

1953 novel

- First edition
- Author: E.C.R. Lorac
- Language: English
- Series: Chief Inspector MacDonald
- Genre: Detective
- Publisher: Collins Crime Club; Doubleday (US)
- Publication date: 1953
- Publication place: United Kingdom
- Media type: Print
- Preceded by: Murder in the Mill-Race
- Followed by: Shroud of Darkness

Crook O'Lune is a 1953 detective novel by E. C. R. Lorac, the pen name of the British writer Edith Caroline Rivett. It is the thirty eighth in her long-running series featuring Chief Inspector MacDonald of Scotland Yard, one of the more orthodox detectives of the Golden Age of Detective Fiction. It was published in the United States by Doubleday under the alternative title of Shepherd's Crook.

As with several of Lorac's work including Fell Murder and Still Waters, the novel takes place in the Lancashire fell country around Lunesdale where she spent much of her time. The title refers to the Crook o' Lune.

== Synopsis ==
While visiting friends in Lancashire, and looking for a property to settle down in when he retires from Scotland Yard, MacDonald agrees to lend his assistance to investigate some sheep-stealing. Before long he is drawn into a case involving arson, blackmail and attempted murder.

== Bibliography ==
- Cooper, John & Pike, B.A. Artists in Crime: An Illustrated Survey of Crime Fiction First Edition Dustwrappers, 1920-1970. Scolar Press, 1995.
- Hubin, Allen J. Crime Fiction, 1749-1980: A Comprehensive Bibliography. Garland Publishing, 1984.
- Nichols, Victoria & Thompson, Susan. Silk Stalkings: More Women Write of Murder. Scarecrow Press, 1998.
- Reilly, John M. Twentieth Century Crime & Mystery Writers. Springer, 2015.
