= The Theft of the Iron Dogs =

1946 novel

- First edition
- Author: E.C.R. Lorac
- Language: English
- Series: Chief Inspector MacDonald
- Genre: Detective
- Publisher: Collins Crime Club
- Publication date: 1946
- Publication place: United Kingdom
- Media type: Print
- Preceded by: Fire in the Thatch
- Followed by: Relative to Poison

The Theft of the Iron Dogs is a 1946 mystery detective novel by E.C.R. Lorac, the pen name of the British writer Edith Caroline Rivett. It is the twenty eighth in her series featuring Chief Inspector MacDonald of Scotland Yard. Originally published by Collins Crime Club, it was reissued in 2023 by the British Library Publishing as part of a group of crime novels from the Golden Age of Detective Fiction. It was published in the United States in 1947 under the alternative title Murderer's Mistake. Like the earlier Fell Murder it is set in the rural Lunesdale area of Lancashire.

== Synopsis ==
Shortly after the Second World War, with rationing still in force, MacDonald is on the track of Gordon Ginner, a cunning London criminal whose current racket involves clothing coupons. He then receives a letter from a farmer in Lancashire about the strange theft of some seemingly near valueless items. Having been enthralled by the area on a previous visit, MacDonald plans to liaise with his Manchester colleagues on the Ginner case before heading on to spend a weekend in Lunesdale, where he can unofficially investigate the thefts.

Before long the two cases merge when the body of Ginner is discovered by MacDonald while swimming in a river. With the help of the locals, he gradually establishes the murdered man's connection to the area and the possibility he was killed by someone he was blackmailing.

== Bibliography ==
- Cooper, John & Pike, B.A. Artists in Crime: An Illustrated Survey of Crime Fiction First Edition Dustwrappers, 1920-1970. Scolar Press, 1995.
- Hubin, Allen J. Crime Fiction, 1749-1980: A Comprehensive Bibliography. Garland Publishing, 1984.
- Nichols, Victoria & Thompson, Susan. Silk Stalkings: More Women Write of Murder. Scarecrow Press, 1998.
- Reilly, John M. Twentieth Century Crime & Mystery Writers. Springer, 2015.
