= Murder on a Monument =

1958 novel

- First edition
- Author: E.C.R. Lorac
- Language: English
- Series: Chief Inspector MacDonald
- Genre: Detective
- Publisher: Collins Crime Club
- Publication date: 1958
- Publication place: United Kingdom
- Media type: Print
- Preceded by: Picture of Death
- Followed by: Dishonour Among Thieves

Murder on a Monument is a 1958 detective novel by E.C.R. Lorac, the pen name of the British writer Edith Caroline Rivett. It is the forty-fifth in her long-running series featuring Superintendent MacDonald of Scotland Yard, one of the more conventional detectives of the Golden Age of Detective Fiction. Along with Murder in Vienna, it was one of the rare ventures abroad for the series, which generally took place in London and rural England. It was the penultimate novel featuring MacDonald to be published during Lorac's lifetime.

== Synopsis ==
While visiting Rome on a case of his own, MacDonald is drawn into investigating a murder involving British siblings, that took place at major monument in the Italian capital.

== Bibliography ==
- Cooper, John & Pike, B.A. Artists in Crime: An Illustrated Survey of Crime Fiction First Edition Dustwrappers, 1920-1970. Scolar Press, 1995.
- Hubin, Allen J. Crime Fiction, 1749-1980: A Comprehensive Bibliography. Garland Publishing, 1984.
- Nichols, Victoria & Thompson, Susan. Silk Stalkings: More Women Write of Murder. Scarecrow Press, 1998.
- Reilly, John M. Twentieth Century Crime & Mystery Writers. Springer, 2015.
