= Death at Dyke's Corner =

1940 novel

- First edition
- Author: E.C.R. Lorac
- Language: English
- Series: Chief Inspector MacDonald
- Genre: Detective
- Publisher: Collins Crime Club (UK); Doubleday (US)
- Publication date: 1940
- Publication place: United Kingdom
- Media type: Print
- Preceded by: Tryst for a Tragedy
- Followed by: Case in the Clinic

Death at Dyke's Corner is a 1940 detective novel by E.C.R. Lorac, the pen name of the British writer Edith Caroline Rivett. It is the 19th in her long-running series featuring Chief Inspector MacDonald of Scotland Yard, a Golden Age detective who relies on standard police procedure to solve his cases.

== Synopsis ==
When a stationary car is struck by an oncoming lorry at a very dangerous hairpin bend known as Dyke's Corner and the driver killed it seems an obvious accident. However, MacDonald's methodical investigations reveal it was in fact a cleverly contrived murder.

== Bibliography ==
- Cooper, John & Pike, B.A. Artists in Crime: An Illustrated Survey of Crime Fiction First Edition Dustwrappers, 1920-1970. Scolar Press, 1995.
- Hubin, Allen J. Crime Fiction, 1749-1980: A Comprehensive Bibliography. Garland Publishing, 1984.
- Nichols, Victoria & Thompson, Susan. Silk Stalkings: More Women Write of Murder. Scarecrow Press, 1998.
- Reilly, John M. Twentieth Century Crime & Mystery Writers. Springer, 2015.
