= Bats in the Belfry (novel) =

1937 novel

- First edition
- Author: E. C. R. Lorac
- Language: English
- Series: Chief Inspector MacDonald
- Genre: Detective
- Publisher: Collins Crime Club
- Publication date: 1937
- Publication place: United Kingdom
- Media type: Print
- Preceded by: These Names Make Clues
- Followed by: The Devil and the C.I.D.

Bats in the Belfry is a 1937 detective novel by E. C. R. Lorac, the pen name of the British writer Edith Caroline Rivett. It is the 13th in her long-running series featuring Chief Inspector MacDonald of Scotland Yard, a Golden Age detective who relies on standard police procedure to solve his cases. Lorac wrote it in the summer of 1936 while staying with her mother at Westward Ho! in North Devon. Originally published by Collins Crime Club, it was reissued in 2018 by the British Library Publishing as part of a group of crime novels from the Golden Age of Detective Fiction.

Reviewing it for the Times Literary Supplement, John Everard Gurdon noted "The plot is intricate and the characterisation sure, with one exception. To identify that exception would be to anticipate the solution." while a later review in A Catalogue of Crime described it as "An early Lorac and a disappointment".

== Synopsis ==
After Bruce Attleton, a once successful now struggling novelist, disappears, after apparently being blackmailed, his friends investigate. Their enquiries take them to Notting Hill and a strange, semi-derelict building with a tower known as The Belfry, now used as an art studio. The police are called in after they discover a suitcase belonging to the missing man, and the blackmailer, an Alsatian sculptor named Debrette, has himself vanished. MacDonald is convinced this is a murder case and begins a tortuous search of the rambling building, eventually finding a headless and handless corpse ingenuously hidden in a wall. But does it belong to Attleton or Debrette?

A further series of accidents to various other figures involved in the case throws doubt on the stories and motives of various suspects, particularly Attleton's actress wife Sybilla and her stockbroker lover. However, MacDonald becomes increasingly convinced that the whole business revolves around a potentially very large inheritance that someone may inherit with Attleton out of the way.

== Bibliography ==
- Cooper, John & Pike, B.A. Artists in Crime: An Illustrated Survey of Crime Fiction First Edition Dustwrappers, 1920-1970. Scolar Press, 1995.
- Hubin, Allen J. Crime Fiction, 1749-1980: A Comprehensive Bibliography. Garland Publishing, 1984.
- Nichols, Victoria & Thompson, Susan. Silk Stalkings: More Women Write of Murder. Scarecrow Press, 1998.
- Reilly, John M. Twentieth Century Crime & Mystery Writers. Springer, 2015.
