= Post After Post-Mortem =

1936 novel

- First edition
- Author: E.C.R. Lorac
- Language: English
- Series: Chief Inspector MacDonald
- Genre: Detective
- Publisher: Collins Crime Club
- Publication date: 1936
- Publication place: United Kingdom
- Media type: Print
- Preceded by: A Pall for a Painter
- Followed by: These Names Make Clues

Post After Post-Mortem is a 1936 detective novel by E.C.R. Lorac, the pen name of the British writer Edith Caroline Rivett. It is the eleventh book featuring Chief Inspector MacDonald of Scotland Yard. Originally published by Collins Crime Club, it was reissued in 2022 by the British Library Publishing as part of a group of crime novels from the Golden Age of Detective Fiction.

== Plot summary ==
The Surrays, a husband and wife and their five offspring, are a prolific writer family, having published scores of novels, reviews and treatises. Ruth, the middle sister, has, however, recently given her elder brother, Richard, some cause for concern. Richard, a psychiatrist, has seen that Ruth appears to be experiencing stress, and he recommends to their mother that she attempt to persuade Ruth to go on holiday with her. However, before this can take place, Ruth is discovered dead in her bedroom at her parents' house, complete with sleeping pills, a farewell letter, and a new will, all of which are strong indicators that she committed suicide. Following the inquest, which produces the anticipated result, Richard returns to his own house where he discovers a letter from Ruth that was written the evening of her passing but wasn't sent right away. In the letter, Ruth appears to be quite content and is making plans for the forthcoming week. Although he does not want to worry his family further, especially his mother, Richard feels compelled to share the contents of the letter with an acquaintance, Inspector Macdonald of the Yard. Macdonald agrees that there is cause to examine Ruth's death further.

Ruth, a clever intellectual with much to say in her novels about the human condition but emotionally unsophisticated and even repressed in her private life, was somewhat of a paradox. Macdonald is soon persuaded that her death was murder and has a number of suspects to consider. On the surface, it would appear that the members of this happy family had no cause to murder a cherished sibling, but Macdonald suspects that more than one of them is concealing something. In addition to the family, three people whom Ruth had invited to a modest home party were involved in her literary profession in some manner, and these too are reluctant to give Macdonald information. Is this reticence designed merely to shield the family from further misery, or does someone have a more sinister reason?

== Bibliography ==
- Cooper, John & Pike, B.A. Artists in Crime: An Illustrated Survey of Crime Fiction First Edition Dustwrappers, 1920-1970. Scolar Press, 1995.
- Hubin, Allen J. Crime Fiction, 1749-1980: A Comprehensive Bibliography. Garland Publishing, 1984.
- Nichols, Victoria & Thompson, Susan. Silk Stalkings: More Women Write of Murder. Scarecrow Press, 1998.
- Reilly, John M. Twentieth Century Crime & Mystery Writers. Springer, 2015.
