= Let Well Alone =

1954 novel

- First edition
- Author: E.C.R. Lorac
- Language: English
- Series: Chief Inspector MacDonald
- Genre: Detective
- Publisher: Collins Crime Club
- Publication date: 1954
- Publication place: United Kingdom
- Media type: Print
- Preceded by: Shroud of Darkness
- Followed by: Ask a Policeman

Let Well Alone is a 1954 detective novel by E.C.R. Lorac, the pen name of the British writer Edith Caroline Rivett. It is the fortieth in her long-running series featuring Chief Inspector MacDonald of Scotland Yard, one of the more orthodox detectives of the Golden Age of Detective Fiction.

== Synopsis ==
Two young couples, tired of life in their drab London lodgings, are overjoyed when they hear that a property in isolated, rural Devon is available at a very cheap rent. However, not long after moving into the Old Court House, a body is discovered in one of the outbuildings and their new home instantly seems less idyllic. MacDonald, recently promoted to Superintendent, heads west to lead the investigation.

== Bibliography ==
- Cooper, John & Pike, B.A. Artists in Crime: An Illustrated Survey of Crime Fiction First Edition Dustwrappers, 1920-1970. Scolar Press, 1995.
- Hubin, Allen J. Crime Fiction, 1749-1980: A Comprehensive Bibliography. Garland Publishing, 1984.
- Nichols, Victoria & Thompson, Susan. Silk Stalkings: More Women Write of Murder. Scarecrow Press, 1998.
- Reilly, John M. Twentieth Century Crime & Mystery Writers. Springer, 2015.
