= Ask a Policeman (novel) =

1955 novel

- First edition
- Author: E.C.R. Lorac
- Language: English
- Series: Chief Inspector MacDonald
- Genre: Detective
- Publisher: Collins Crime Club
- Publication date: 1955
- Publication place: United Kingdom
- Media type: Print
- Preceded by: Let Well Alone
- Followed by: Murder in Vienna

Ask a Policeman is a 1955 detective novel by E.C.R. Lorac, the pen name of the British writer Edith Caroline Rivett. It is the forty first in her long-running series featuring Chief Inspector MacDonald of Scotland Yard. Published by the Collins Crime Club, the title references the popular music hall song Ask a Policeman.

== Synopsis ==
An elderly lady, a leftover from the Edwardian era, reports the disappearance of her nephew, a journalist. What seems at first a routine case quickly becomes a hunt for a murderer when the police investigate his last known address, a large rambling house in St John's Wood. Efforts to discover the truth are further hampered by the death or disappearance of several witnesses.

== Bibliography ==
- Cooper, John & Pike, B.A. Artists in Crime: An Illustrated Survey of Crime Fiction First Edition Dustwrappers, 1920–1970. Scolar Press, 1995.
- Hubin, Allen J. Crime Fiction, 1749–1980: A Comprehensive Bibliography. Garland Publishing, 1984.
- Nichols, Victoria & Thompson, Susan. Silk Stalkings: More Women Write of Murder. Scarecrow Press, 1998.
- Reilly, John M. Twentieth Century Crime & Mystery Writers. Springer, 2015.
