= Rope's End, Rogue's End =

1942 novel

- First edition
- Author: E.C.R. Lorac
- Language: English
- Series: Chief Inspector MacDonald
- Genre: Detective
- Publisher: Collins Crime Club
- Publication date: 1942
- Publication place: United Kingdom
- Media type: Print
- Preceded by: Case in the Clinic
- Followed by: The Sixteenth Stair

Rope's End, Rogue's End is a 1942 detective novel by E.C.R. Lorac, the pen name of the British writer Edith Caroline Rivett. It is the twenty first in her long-running series featuring Chief Inspector MacDonald of Scotland Yard, a Golden Age detective who relies on standard police procedure to solve his cases. It takes the form of the country house mystery, popular during the era.

== Synopsis ==
Veronica Mallowood summons her various relatives to Wulfstane Manor to discuss the future of the family property, the first time they have all gathered there together since the death of her father. The following day her brother is shot in an apparent suicide, which turns out to be murder.

== Bibliography ==
- Cooper, John & Pike, B.A. Artists in Crime: An Illustrated Survey of Crime Fiction First Edition Dustwrappers, 1920-1970. Scolar Press, 1995.
- Hubin, Allen J. Crime Fiction, 1749-1980: A Comprehensive Bibliography. Garland Publishing, 1984.
- Nichols, Victoria & Thompson, Susan. Silk Stalkings: More Women Write of Murder. Scarecrow Press, 1998.
- Reilly, John M. Twentieth Century Crime & Mystery Writers. Springer, 2015.
