= These Names Make Clues =

1937 novel

- First edition
- Author: E.C.R. Lorac
- Language: English
- Series: Chief Inspector MacDonald
- Genre: Detective
- Publisher: Collins Crime Club
- Publication date: 1937
- Publication place: United Kingdom
- Media type: Print
- Preceded by: Post After Post-Mortem
- Followed by: Bats in the Belfry

These Names Make Clues is a 1937 detective novel by E.C.R. Lorac, the pen name of the British writer Edith Caroline Rivett. It was the twelfth entry in her long-running series featuring Chief Inspector MacDonald of Scotland Yard. It was written shortly after Lorac had been elected as a member of the Detection Club, and was likely influenced by her experiences there. Originally published by Collins Crime Club, it was reissued in 2021 by the British Library Publishing as part of a group of crime novels from the Golden Age of Detective Fiction.

== Synopsis ==
MacDonald is invited to the London home of a publisher to take part in a treasure hunt based on various intellectual clues against various authors, everyone using the alias of a celebrated historical writer. When an obnoxious but bestselling crime novelist is found dead things take on a more serious turn.

== Bibliography ==
- Cooper, John & Pike, B.A. Artists in Crime: An Illustrated Survey of Crime Fiction First Edition Dustwrappers, 1920-1970. Scolar Press, 1995.
- Hubin, Allen J. Crime Fiction, 1749-1980: A Comprehensive Bibliography. Garland Publishing, 1984.
- Nichols, Victoria & Thompson, Susan. Silk Stalkings: More Women Write of Murder. Scarecrow Press, 1998.
- Reilly, John M. Twentieth Century Crime & Mystery Writers. Springer, 2015.
