= The Sixteenth Stair =

1942 novel

- First edition
- Author: E.C.R. Lorac
- Language: English
- Series: Chief Inspector MacDonald
- Genre: Detective
- Publisher: Collins Crime Club
- Publication date: 1942
- Publication place: United Kingdom
- Media type: Print
- Preceded by: Rope's End, Rogue's End
- Followed by: Death Came Softly

The Sixteenth Stair is a 1942 detective novel by E.C.R. Lorac, the pen name of the British writer Edith Caroline Rivett. It is the twenty second in her long-running series featuring Chief Inspector MacDonald of Scotland Yard, a Golden Age detective who relies on standard police procedure to solve his cases.

== Synopsis ==
A nineteenth century villa in St John's Wood has been owned by the Hazely family since it was built, but it now lies abandoned and empty. When an American cousin pays an unexpected visit to the old house, he discovers a body lying at the foot of a staircase with its neck broken. As MacDonald investigates it soon transpires that the house has not been as abandoned as widely thought.

== Bibliography ==
- Cooper, John & Pike, B.A. Artists in Crime: An Illustrated Survey of Crime Fiction First Edition Dustwrappers, 1920–1970. Scolar Press, 1995.
- Hubin, Allen J. Crime Fiction, 1749–1980: A Comprehensive Bibliography. Garland Publishing, 1984.
- Nichols, Victoria & Thompson, Susan. Silk Stalkings: More Women Write of Murder. Scarecrow Press, 1998.
- Reilly, John M. Twentieth Century Crime & Mystery Writers. Springer, 2015.
