= Relative to Poison =

1947 novel

- First edition (UK)
- Author: E.C.R. Lorac
- Language: English
- Series: Chief Inspector MacDonald
- Genre: Detective
- Publisher: Collins Crime Club (UK); Doubleday (US)
- Publication date: 1947
- Publication place: United Kingdom
- Media type: Print
- Preceded by: The Theft of the Iron Dogs
- Followed by: Death Before Dinner

Relative to Poison is a 1947 detective novel by E.C.R. Lorac, the pen name of the British writer Edith Caroline Rivett. It is the twenty ninth in her long-running series featuring Chief Inspector MacDonald of Scotland Yard, one of the detectives of the Golden Age of Detective Fiction who relies on standard police procedure to solve his cases.

== Synopsis ==
A recently demobbed ATS girl is offered employment in a Regent Street café, and takes her friend along. Before long they find themselves embroiled in a case of murder

== Bibliography ==
- Cooper, John & Pike, B.A. Artists in Crime: An Illustrated Survey of Crime Fiction First Edition Dustwrappers, 1920-1970. Scolar Press, 1995.
- Hubin, Allen J. Crime Fiction, 1749-1980: A Comprehensive Bibliography. Garland Publishing, 1984.
- Nichols, Victoria & Thompson, Susan. Silk Stalkings: More Women Write of Murder. Scarecrow Press, 1998.
- Reilly, John M. Twentieth Century Crime & Mystery Writers. Springer, 2015.
