= Shroud of Darkness =

1954 novel

- First edition
- Author: E.C.R. Lorac
- Language: English
- Series: Chief Inspector MacDonald
- Genre: Detective
- Publisher: Collins Crime Club (UK); Doubleday (US)
- Publication date: 1954
- Publication place: United Kingdom
- Media type: Print
- Preceded by: Crook O'Lune
- Followed by: Let Well Alone

Shroud of Darkness is a 1954 detective novel by E.C.R. Lorac, the pen name of the British writer Edith Caroline Rivett. It is the 39th in her long-running series featuring Chief Inspector Macdonald of Scotland Yard, one of the more orthodox detectives of the Golden Age of Detective Fiction.

== Synopsis ==
A young man recently arrived at Paddington Station on a train from Exeter is discovered with his head bashed in. Any possible clues of identity have been taken from the body, and the assault was committed during a very heavy London Fog (specifically the Great Smog of London of December 1952). With these very few leads to follow, Macdonald begins his investigation. He deduces that the case may have its origins in either Devon or the capital, or perhaps both.

== Bibliography ==
- Cooper, John & Pike, B.A. Artists in Crime: An Illustrated Survey of Crime Fiction First Edition Dustwrappers, 1920-1970. Scolar Press, 1995.
- Hubin, Allen J. Crime Fiction, 1749-1980: A Comprehensive Bibliography. Garland Publishing, 1984.
- Nichols, Victoria & Thompson, Susan. Silk Stalkings: More Women Write of Murder. Scarecrow Press, 1998.
- Reilly, John M. Twentieth Century Crime & Mystery Writers. Springer, 2015.
