= Death Before Dinner =

1948 novel

- First edition (UK)
- Author: E.C.R. Lorac
- Language: English
- Series: Chief Inspector MacDonald
- Genre: Detective
- Publisher: Collins Crime Club (UK); Doubleday (US)
- Publication date: 1948
- Publication place: United Kingdom
- Media type: Print
- Preceded by: Relative to Poison
- Followed by: Part for a Poisoner

Death Before Dinner is a 1948 detective novel by E.C.R. Lorac, the pen name of the British writer Edith Caroline Rivett. It is the thirtieth in her long-running series featuring Chief Inspector MacDonald of Scotland Yard, one of the detectives of the Golden Age of Detective Fiction who relies on standard police procedure to solve his cases. It was published in the United States by Doubleday under the alternative title of A Screen for Murder.

== Synopsis ==
During World War II, in a London suffering from bombing raids, eight travellers and writers meet for a formal dinner at a highly-regarded French restaurant. Each believes that they have been invited to become members of the highly prestigious Marco Polo Club, but when no officials of the club arrive they realise that they have been hoaxed. They continue with the dinner anyway but at the end a dead body is discovered. Is there a connection with the hoax? Was the dead man the hoaxer? Chief Inspector Macdonald investigates – and so do some of the other guests. Will more murders follow?

== Bibliography ==
- Cooper, John & Pike, B.A. Artists in Crime: An Illustrated Survey of Crime Fiction First Edition Dustwrappers, 1920-1970. Scolar Press, 1995.
- Hubin, Allen J. Crime Fiction, 1749-1980: A Comprehensive Bibliography. Garland Publishing, 1984.
- Nichols, Victoria & Thompson, Susan. Silk Stalkings: More Women Write of Murder. Scarecrow Press, 1998.
- Reilly, John M. Twentieth Century Crime & Mystery Writers. Springer, 2015.
