= Case in the Clinic =

1941 novel

- First edition
- Author: E.C.R. Lorac
- Language: English
- Series: Chief Inspector MacDonald
- Genre: Detective
- Publisher: Collins Crime Club
- Publication date: 1941
- Publication place: United Kingdom
- Media type: Print
- Preceded by: Death at Dyke's Corner
- Followed by: Rope's End, Rogue's End

Case in the Clinic is a 1941 detective novel by E.C.R. Lorac, the pen name of the British writer Edith Caroline Rivett. It is the 20th in her long-running series featuring Chief Inspector MacDonald of Scotland Yard, a Golden Age detective who relies on standard police procedure to solve his cases.

== Synopsis ==
In a small market town the death of the Reverend Anderby in his garden is followed swiftly afterwards by another sudden death leading to local suspicions and the call in of Scotland Yard to investigate.

== Bibliography ==
- Cooper, John & Pike, B.A. Artists in Crime: An Illustrated Survey of Crime Fiction First Edition Dustwrappers, 1920-1970. Scolar Press, 1995.
- Hubin, Allen J. Crime Fiction, 1749-1980: A Comprehensive Bibliography. Garland Publishing, 1984.
- Nichols, Victoria & Thompson, Susan. Silk Stalkings: More Women Write of Murder. Scarecrow Press, 1998.
- Reilly, John M. Twentieth Century Crime & Mystery Writers. Springer, 2015.
