= Policemen in the Precinct =

1949 novel

- First edition
- Author: E.C.R. Lorac
- Language: English
- Series: Chief Inspector MacDonald
- Genre: Detective
- Publisher: Collins Crime Club (UK); Doubleday (US)
- Publication date: 1949
- Publication place: United Kingdom
- Media type: Print
- Preceded by: Still Waters
- Followed by: Accident by Design

Policemen in the Precinct is a 1949 detective story by E.C.R. Lorac, the pen name of the British writer Edith Caroline Rivett. It was the thirty third entry in her long-running series featuring Chief Inspector MacDonald of Scotland Yard. It was published in the United States by Doubleday using the alternative title And Then Put Out the Light.

Reviewing the novel in The Observer Maurice Richardson wrote "Tense throughout, this is Mr. Lorac’s best book and reminds us how much life—despite the claims of the tough school—there is in the old provincial English whodunnit yet."

== Synopsis ==
In Paulborough, a Midlands market town dominated by its Norman abbey, a notorious local gossip is found dead after spreading gossip about prominent figures in the town.

== Bibliography ==
- Cooper, John & Pike, B.A. Artists in Crime: An Illustrated Survey of Crime Fiction First Edition Dustwrappers, 1920-1970. Scolar Press, 1995.
- Hubin, Allen J. Crime Fiction, 1749-1980: A Comprehensive Bibliography. Garland Publishing, 1984.
- Nichols, Victoria & Thompson, Susan. Silk Stalkings: More Women Write of Murder. Scarecrow Press, 1998.
- Reilly, John M. Twentieth Century Crime & Mystery Writers. Springer, 2015.
