= Part for a Poisoner =

1948 novel

- First edition
- Author: E.C.R. Lorac
- Language: English
- Series: Chief Inspector MacDonald
- Genre: Detective
- Publisher: Collins Crime Club (UK); Doubleday (US)
- Publication date: 1948
- Publication place: United Kingdom
- Media type: Print
- Preceded by: Death Before Dinner
- Followed by: Still Waters

Part for a Poisoner is a 1948 detective novel by E.C.R. Lorac, the pen name of the British writer Edith Caroline Rivett. It is the thirty first in her long-running series featuring Chief Inspector MacDonald of Scotland Yard, one of the more conventional detectives of the Golden Age of Detective Fiction who relies on standard police procedure to solve his cases. It was published in the United States by Doubleday under the alternative title of Place for a Poisoner.

== Synopsis ==
A wealthy old man is apparently dying, with numerous expectant relatives. However his growing affection for the attractive nurse caring for him leads him to propose marriage to her. His health recovers and his relatives are despondent. Which makes it all the more suspicious when he dies shortly before the marriage.

== Bibliography ==
- Cooper, John & Pike, B.A. Artists in Crime: An Illustrated Survey of Crime Fiction First Edition Dustwrappers, 1920-1970. Scolar Press, 1995.
- Hubin, Allen J. Crime Fiction, 1749-1980: A Comprehensive Bibliography. Garland Publishing, 1984.
- Nichols, Victoria & Thompson, Susan. Silk Stalkings: More Women Write of Murder. Scarecrow Press, 1998.
- Reilly, John M. Twentieth Century Crime & Mystery Writers. Springer, 2015.
