= The Organ Speaks =

1935 novel

- First edition
- Author: E.C.R. Lorac
- Language: English
- Series: Chief Inspector MacDonald
- Genre: Detective
- Publisher: Sampson Low
- Publication date: 1935
- Publication place: United Kingdom
- Media type: Print
- Preceded by: Murder in Chelsea
- Followed by: Crime Counter Crime

The Organ Speaks is a 1935 detective novel by E.C.R. Lorac, the pen name of the British writer Edith Caroline Rivett. It is the eighth book featuring Chief Inspector MacDonald of Scotland Yard who appeared in a lengthy series of novels during the Golden Age of Detective Fiction.

It received a positive review in The Sunday Times from Dorothy L. Sayers. Its success led to Lorac switching publishers from Sampson Low to the more prestigious Collins Crime Club soon afterwards. She was also elected to membership of the Detection Club.

== Synopsis ==
At the Regency concert hall in Regent's Park, the body of a man Anthony Loudon is discovered in the organ loft.

== Bibliography ==
- Cooper, John & Pike, B.A. Artists in Crime: An Illustrated Survey of Crime Fiction First Edition Dustwrappers, 1920-1970. Scolar Press, 1995.
- Hubin, Allen J. Crime Fiction, 1749-1980: A Comprehensive Bibliography. Garland Publishing, 1984.
- Kenney, Catherine. The Remarkable Case of Dorothy L. Sayers. Kent State University Press, 1991.
- Nichols, Victoria & Thompson, Susan. Silk Stalkings: More Women Write of Murder. Scarecrow Press, 1998.
- Reilly, John M. Twentieth Century Crime & Mystery Writers. Springer, 2015.
