= A Pall for a Painter =

1936 novel

- First edition
- Author: E.C.R. Lorac
- Language: English
- Series: Chief Inspector MacDonald
- Genre: Detective
- Publisher: Collins Crime Club
- Publication date: 1936
- Publication place: United Kingdom
- Media type: Print
- Preceded by: Crime Counter Crime
- Followed by: Post After Post-Mortem

A Pall for a Painter is a 1936 detective novel by E.C.R. Lorac, the pen name of the British writer Edith Caroline Rivett. It is the tenth in her long-running series featuring Chief Inspector MacDonald of Scotland Yard, a Golden Age detective who relies on standard police procedure to solve his cases.

== Synopsis ==
MacDonald is called in to solve a murder that took place in an art school in Central London.

== Bibliography ==
- Cooper, John & Pike, B.A. Artists in Crime: An Illustrated Survey of Crime Fiction First Edition Dustwrappers, 1920-1970. Scolar Press, 1995.
- Hubin, Allen J. Crime Fiction, 1749-1980: A Comprehensive Bibliography. Garland Publishing, 1984.
- Nichols, Victoria & Thompson, Susan. Silk Stalkings: More Women Write of Murder. Scarecrow Press, 1998.
- Reilly, John M. Twentieth Century Crime & Mystery Writers. Springer, 2015.
