= Death Came Softly =

1943 novel

- First edition
- Author: E.C.R. Lorac
- Language: English
- Series: Chief Inspector MacDonald
- Genre: Detective
- Publisher: Collins Crime Club (UK); Arcadia House (US)
- Publication date: 1943
- Publication place: United Kingdom
- Media type: Print
- Preceded by: The Sixteenth Stair
- Followed by: Fell Murder

Death Came Softly is a 1943 detective story by E.C.R. Lorac, the pen name of the British writer Edith Caroline Rivett. It was the 23rd entry in her long-running series featuring Chief Inspector MacDonald of Scotland Yard.

== Synopsis ==
An anthropology professor living in the Hermit's cave at Valehead House, his daughter's Devon estate, is founded gassed to death by carbon monoxide one morning. Chief Inspector MacDonald is called in to solve the baffling crime.

== Bibliography ==
- Hubin, Allen J. Crime Fiction, 1749-1980: A Comprehensive Bibliography. Garland Publishing, 1984.
- Nichols, Victoria & Thompson, Susan. Silk Stalkings: More Women Write of Murder. Scarecrow Press, 1998.
- Reilly, John M. Twentieth Century Crime & Mystery Writers. Springer, 2015.
