= Crime Counter Crime =

1936 novel

- First edition
- Author: E.C.R. Lorac
- Language: English
- Series: Chief Inspector MacDonald
- Genre: Detective
- Publisher: Collins Crime Club
- Publication date: 1936
- Publication place: United Kingdom
- Media type: Print
- Preceded by: The Organ Speaks
- Followed by: A Pall for a Painter

Crime Counter Crime is a 1936 detective novel by E.C.R. Lorac, the pen name of the British writer Edith Caroline Rivett. It is the ninth in her long-running series featuring Chief Inspector MacDonald of Scotland Yard, a Golden Age detective who relies on standard police procedure to solve his cases. It was her first novel published by Collins Crime Club after switching from Sampson Low, partly on the success of the previous entry in the series The Organ Speaks. Collins then published the remainder the series.

== Synopsis ==
In a Lancashire mining town during the 1935 General Election, a communist agitator is found murdered while on his way to disrupt a speaking engagement by the Conservative Party candidate. Tensions are further raised when a hardline nationalist politician sets his own party followers to investigate the murder.

== Bibliography ==
- Cooper, John & Pike, B.A. Artists in Crime: An Illustrated Survey of Crime Fiction First Edition Dustwrappers, 1920-1970. Scolar Press, 1995.
- Hubin, Allen J. Crime Fiction, 1749-1980: A Comprehensive Bibliography. Garland Publishing, 1984.
- Nichols, Victoria & Thompson, Susan. Silk Stalkings: More Women Write of Murder. Scarecrow Press, 1998.
- Reilly, John M. Twentieth Century Crime & Mystery Writers. Springer, 2015.
