= Fire in the Thatch =

1946 novel

- First edition
- Author: E.C.R. Lorac
- Language: English
- Series: Chief Inspector MacDonald
- Genre: Detective
- Publisher: Collins Crime Club
- Publication date: 1946
- Publication place: United Kingdom
- Media type: Print
- Preceded by: Murder by Matchlight
- Followed by: The Theft of the Iron Dogs

Fire in the Thatch is a 1946 detective novel by E.C.R. Lorac, the pen name of the British writer Edith Caroline Rivett. It is the 27th in her long-running series featuring Chief Inspector MacDonald of Scotland Yard. Originally published by Collins Crime Club, it was reissued in 2018 by the British Library Publishing as part of a group of crime novels from the Golden Age of Detective Fiction.

== Synopsis ==
The novel is set in South Devon in the last year of the Second World War. Colonel St Cyres, a landowner and farmer of Devon Cattle, rents a thatched cottage on his estate to a new tenant. Recently discharged from the Navy the new arrival plans to operate as a market gardener. This is greatly to the annoyance of his daughter-in-law June, a spoilt Mayfair woman living with him while her husband is in a Japanese prisoner of war camp. June had hoped that her friend Tommy Gressingham would take the property, as part of his plans to build a luxury hotel on the site. When the new tenant is found dead in the burned-out cottage, MacDonald is called in from Scotland Yard to investigate the possibility of murder.

== Bibliography ==
- Cooper, John & Pike, B.A. Artists in Crime: An Illustrated Survey of Crime Fiction First Edition Dustwrappers, 1920-1970. Scolar Press, 1995.
- Hubin, Allen J. Crime Fiction, 1749-1980: A Comprehensive Bibliography. Garland Publishing, 1984.
- Nichols, Victoria & Thompson, Susan. Silk Stalkings: More Women Write of Murder. Scarecrow Press, 1998.
- Reilly, John M. Twentieth Century Crime & Mystery Writers. Springer, 2015.
