= Murder by Matchlight =

1945 novel

- First edition
- Author: E.C.R. Lorac
- Language: English
- Series: Chief Inspector MacDonald
- Genre: Detective
- Publisher: Collins Crime Club (UK); Arcadia House (US)
- Publication date: 1945
- Publication place: United Kingdom
- Media type: Print
- Preceded by: Checkmate to Murder
- Followed by: Fire in the Thatch

Murder by Matchlight is a 1945 detective novel by E.C.R. Lorac, the pen name of the British writer Edith Caroline Rivett. It was the twenty sixth novel of her long-running series featuring Chief Inspector MacDonald of Scotland Yard. Originally published by Collins Crime Club, it was reissued in 2018 by the British Library Publishing as part of a group of crime novels from the Golden Age of Detective Fiction.

== Synopsis ==
On a November night in Regent's Park a man witnesses another being coshed over the head, illuminated only by the match he was lighting for his cigarette. The body is identified by his identity card as John Ward, but further investigations reveal he is really an Irishman named Timothy O'Farrel who had stolen the identity of another man killed in an air raid in Camberwell some months earlier. Enquiries at the theatrical boarding house in Notting Hill where he had been living reveal the dead man was a charming, but good-for-nothing scrounger given to blackmail and black market activities. To further complicate matters, the house is struck and partly destroyed by an incendiary device during a German raid.

== Bibliography ==
- Cooper, John & Pike, B.A. Artists in Crime: An Illustrated Survey of Crime Fiction First Edition Dustwrappers, 1920-1970. Scolar Press, 1995.
- Hubin, Allen J. Crime Fiction, 1749-1980: A Comprehensive Bibliography. Garland Publishing, 1984.
- Nichols, Victoria & Thompson, Susan. Silk Stalkings: More Women Write of Murder. Scarecrow Press, 1998.
- Reilly, John M. Twentieth Century Crime & Mystery Writers. Springer, 2015.
