= Accident by Design =

1950 novel

- First edition
- Author: E.C.R. Lorac
- Language: English
- Series: Chief Inspector MacDonald
- Genre: Detective
- Publisher: Collins Crime Club (UK); Doubleday (US)
- Publication date: 1950
- Publication place: United Kingdom
- Media type: Print
- Preceded by: Policemen in the Precinct
- Followed by: Murder of a Martinet

Accident by Design is a 1950 detective novel by E.C.R. Lorac, the pen name of the British writer Edith Caroline Rivett. It is the 34th in her long-running series featuring Chief Inspector MacDonald of Scotland Yard. Like a number of Lorac's works it takes the form of a country house mystery, a popular branch of the genre during the Golden Age of Detective Fiction. Maurice Richardson in a review in The Observer wrote "The usual carefully constructed, rural family murder case which we expect from this eminently trustworthy exponent of the English school of whodunnit."

== Synopsis ==
Living in the grand Templedean Place in the Cotswolds, the Vanstead family are riven by mistrust and conflict. This is particularly directed towards the heir Gerald, returned from a Japanese internment camp in Malaya along with a brash Australian wife Muriel. When they died in a car crash, MacDonald has to investigate whether this was an accident or by deliberate intent.

== Bibliography ==
- Cooper, John & Pike, B.A. Artists in Crime: An Illustrated Survey of Crime Fiction First Edition Dustwrappers, 1920-1970. Scolar Press, 1995.
- Hubin, Allen J. Crime Fiction, 1749-1980: A Comprehensive Bibliography. Garland Publishing, 1984.
- Nichols, Victoria & Thompson, Susan. Silk Stalkings: More Women Write of Murder. Scarecrow Press, 1998.
- Reilly, John M. Twentieth Century Crime & Mystery Writers. Springer, 2015.
