= Death of an Author (Lorac novel) =

1935 novel

- First edition
- Author: E.C.R. Lorac
- Language: English
- Genre: Detective
- Publisher: Sampson Low
- Publication date: 1935
- Publication place: United Kingdom
- Media type: Print

Death of an Author is a 1935 detective novel by E.C.R. Lorac, the pen name of the British writer Edith Caroline Rivett. It is a rare standalone book by Lorac, not featuring Chief Inspector MacDonald of Scotland Yard who appeared in a lengthy series of novels during the Golden Age of Detective Fiction. It was her final novel published by Sampson Low before, she switched to the more prestigious Collins Crime Club with whom she remained for the rest of her career.

== Synopsis ==
Vivian Lestrange, a successful but reclusive crime fiction writer, is reported missing by his secretary Eleanor Clarke. Soon afterwards Lestrange's housekeeper also disappears. But is Clarke herself Lestrange, trying to drum up publicity? Inspectors Bond of the local police and Warner of Scotland Yard join forces to try and solve the mystery. Before long it becomes clear that this is a case of murder.

== Bibliography ==
- Cooper, John & Pike, B.A. Artists in Crime: An Illustrated Survey of Crime Fiction First Edition Dustwrappers, 1920-1970. Scolar Press, 1995.
- Hubin, Allen J. Crime Fiction, 1749-1980: A Comprehensive Bibliography. Garland Publishing, 1984.
- Nichols, Victoria & Thompson, Susan. Silk Stalkings: More Women Write of Murder. Scarecrow Press, 1998.
- Reilly, John M. Twentieth Century Crime & Mystery Writers. Springer, 2015.
