= Murder of a Martinet =

1951 novel

- First edition
- Author: E.C.R. Lorac
- Language: English
- Series: Chief Inspector MacDonald
- Genre: Detective
- Publisher: Collins Crime Club (UK); Doubleday (US)
- Publication date: 1951
- Publication place: United Kingdom
- Media type: Print
- Preceded by: Accident by Design
- Followed by: The Dog It Was That Died

Murder of a Martinet is a 1951 detective novel by E.C.R. Lorac, the pen name of the British writer Edith Caroline Rivett. It is the 35th in her long-running series featuring Chief Inspector MacDonald of Scotland Yard. It was published in the United States by Doubleday under the alternative title of I Could Murder Her.

== Synopsis ==
In a manor house in the English countryside Muriel Farrington rules over her various grown children like a martinet, keeping them all in line whenever anyone threatens to dissent from her. When she is found dead, MacDonald is called in to cast his eye over several possible culprits.

== Bibliography ==
- Cooper, John & Pike, B.A. Artists in Crime: An Illustrated Survey of Crime Fiction First Edition Dustwrappers, 1920-1970. Scolar Press, 1995.
- Hubin, Allen J. Crime Fiction, 1749-1980: A Comprehensive Bibliography. Garland Publishing, 1984.
- Nichols, Victoria & Thompson, Susan. Silk Stalkings: More Women Write of Murder. Scarecrow Press, 1998.
- Reilly, John M. Twentieth Century Crime & Mystery Writers. Springer, 2015.
