= Murder in the Mill-Race =

1952 novel

- First edition
- Author: E.C.R. Lorac
- Language: English
- Series: Chief Inspector MacDonald
- Genre: Detective
- Publisher: Collins Crime Club (UK); Doubleday (US)
- Publication date: 1952
- Publication place: United Kingdom
- Media type: Print
- Preceded by: The Dog It Was That Died
- Followed by: Crook O'Lune

Murder in the Mill-Race (sometimes written as Murder in the Mill Race) is a 1952 detective novel by E.C.R. Lorac, the pen name of the British writer Edith Caroline Rivett. It is the 37th in her long-running series featuring Chief Inspector MacDonald of Scotland Yard, one of the numerous detectives of the Golden Age of Detective Fiction. It was released in the United States under the alternative title Speak Justly of the Dead. Originally published by Collins Crime Club, it was reissued in 2019 by the British Library Publishing as part of a group of crime novels from the Golden Age of Detective Fiction.

== Synopsis ==
In the picturesque North Devon village of Milham near Exmoor, the body of a local woman is found floating in the mill race. MacDonald's investigations meet a seeming wall of silence from the locals. Many consider the dead woman to be close to a saint, who worked for various local charities for almost no money. Other, newer arrivals, are more suspicious of the good tidings of the dead woman.

== Bibliography ==
- Cooper, John & Pike, B.A. Artists in Crime: An Illustrated Survey of Crime Fiction First Edition Dustwrappers, 1920-1970. Scolar Press, 1995.
- Hubin, Allen J. Crime Fiction, 1749-1980: A Comprehensive Bibliography. Garland Publishing, 1984.
- Nichols, Victoria & Thompson, Susan. Silk Stalkings: More Women Write of Murder. Scarecrow Press, 1998.
- Reilly, John M. Twentieth Century Crime & Mystery Writers. Springer, 2015.
