= Murder in Vienna =

1956 novel

- First edition
- Author: E.C.R. Lorac
- Language: English
- Series: Chief Inspector MacDonald
- Genre: Detective
- Publisher: Collins Crime Club
- Publication date: 1956
- Publication place: United Kingdom
- Media type: Print
- Preceded by: Ask a Policeman
- Followed by: Dangerous Domicile

Murder in Vienna is a 1956 detective novel by E.C.R. Lorac, the pen name of the British writer Edith Caroline Rivett. It is the 42nd in her long-running series featuring Chief Inspector MacDonald of Scotland Yard, one of the more conventional detectives of the Golden Age of Detective Fiction. It has an unusual foreign setting, post-war Vienna at the time when the Allied occupants were leaving the country as a consequence of the Austrian State Treaty, compared to the rest of the series which generally takes place in London or the English countryside. Maurice Richardson reviewing the novel for The Observer described it as the "usual solid job".

== Synopsis ==
While taking a break from his police duties during a holiday to Austria, MacDonald is drawn into an investigation when the English secretary of a retired diplomat is attacked and an English author is murdered.

== Bibliography ==
- Cooper, John & Pike, B.A. Artists in Crime: An Illustrated Survey of Crime Fiction First Edition Dustwrappers, 1920-1970. Scolar Press, 1995.
- Hubin, Allen J. Crime Fiction, 1749-1980: A Comprehensive Bibliography. Garland Publishing, 1984.
- Nichols, Victoria & Thompson, Susan. Silk Stalkings: More Women Write of Murder. Scarecrow Press, 1998.
- Reilly, John M. Twentieth Century Crime & Mystery Writers. Springer, 2015.
