= Murder in Chelsea =

1934 novel

- First edition (UK)
- Author: E.C.R. Lorac
- Language: English
- Series: Chief Inspector MacDonald
- Genre: Detective
- Publisher: Sampson Low; Macauley (US)
- Publication date: 1934
- Publication place: United Kingdom
- Media type: Print
- Preceded by: Murder in St. John's Wood
- Followed by: The Organ Speaks

Murder in Chelsea is a 1934 detective novel by E.C.R. Lorac, the pen name of the British writer Edith Caroline Rivett. It is the seventh book featuring Chief Inspector MacDonald of Scotland Yard who appeared in a lengthy series of novels during the Golden Age of Detective Fiction.

== Synopsis ==
A young woman, a keen bibliophile and co-owner of a bookshop, is found gassed to death in the bed of her Chelsea home.

== Bibliography ==
- Cooper, John & Pike, B.A. Artists in Crime: An Illustrated Survey of Crime Fiction First Edition Dustwrappers, 1920-1970. Scolar Press, 1995.
- Hubin, Allen J. Crime Fiction, 1749-1980: A Comprehensive Bibliography. Garland Publishing, 1984.
- Nichols, Victoria & Thompson, Susan. Silk Stalkings: More Women Write of Murder. Scarecrow Press, 1998.
- Reilly, John M. Twentieth Century Crime & Mystery Writers. Springer, 2015.
