= Murder in St. John's Wood =

1934 novel

- First edition
- Author: E.C.R. Lorac
- Language: English
- Series: Chief Inspector MacDonald
- Genre: Detective
- Publisher: Sampson Low; Macauley (US)
- Publication date: 1934
- Publication place: United Kingdom
- Media type: Print
- Preceded by: Death on the Oxford Road
- Followed by: Murder in Chelsea

Murder in St. John's Wood is a 1934 detective novel by E.C.R. Lorac, the pen name of the British writer Edith Caroline Rivett. It is the sixth book featuring Chief Inspector MacDonald of Scotland Yard, who appeared in a lengthy series of novels during the Golden Age of Detective Fiction.

== Synopsis ==
When millionaire Hilary Vanbrugh is found shot dead in the summer house of the garden of his residence in St John's Wood, it appears to be suicide. However, Vanbrugh had so many enemies and certain inconsistencies in the manner of death led to MacDonald being appointed to the case.

== Bibliography ==
- Cooper, John & Pike, B.A. Artists in Crime: An Illustrated Survey of Crime Fiction First Edition Dustwrappers, 1920-1970. Scolar Press, 1995.
- Hubin, Allen J. Crime Fiction, 1749-1980: A Comprehensive Bibliography. Garland Publishing, 1984.
- Nichols, Victoria & Thompson, Susan. Silk Stalkings: More Women Write of Murder. Scarecrow Press, 1998.
- Reilly, John M. Twentieth Century Crime & Mystery Writers. Springer, 2015.
