= The Dog It Was That Died (novel) =

1952 novel

- First edition
- Author: E.C.R. Lorac
- Language: English
- Series: Chief Inspector MacDonald
- Genre: Detective
- Publisher: Collins Crime Club (UK); Doubleday (US)
- Publication date: 1952
- Publication place: United Kingdom
- Media type: Print
- Preceded by: Murder of a Martinet
- Followed by: Murder in the Mill-Race

The Dog It Was That Died is a 1952 detective novel by E.C.R. Lorac, the pen name of the British writer Edith Caroline Rivett. It is the thirty sixth in her long-running series featuring Chief Inspector MacDonald of Scotland Yard, one of the more conventional detectives of the Golden Age of Detective Fiction. It was published by the Collins Crime Club.

== Synopsis ==
When Rodney Bretton, a lecturer in mathematics, is knocked down and killed by a lorry is it assumed to be a tragic accident. However the drowning of his daughter Wendy in her bath a couple of months later leads MacDonald to launch an investigation.

== Bibliography ==
- Cooper, John & Pike, B.A. Artists in Crime: An Illustrated Survey of Crime Fiction First Edition Dustwrappers, 1920-1970. Scolar Press, 1995.
- Hubin, Allen J. Crime Fiction, 1749-1980: A Comprehensive Bibliography. Garland Publishing, 1984.
- Nichols, Victoria & Thompson, Susan. Silk Stalkings: More Women Write of Murder. Scarecrow Press, 1998.
- Reilly, John M. Twentieth Century Crime & Mystery Writers. Springer, 2015.
