= 1 Is One =

1957 Caldecott picture book

- Author: Tasha Tudor
- Publisher: Henry Z. Walck, Inc., HarperCollins
- Publication date: 1956
- Pages: unpaged
- Awards: Caldecott Honor

1 is One is a 1956 children’s picture book written and illustrated by Tasha Tudor. The book counts to twenty in numbers and watercolor illustrations. Some of the illustrations show animals like ducklings and sheep. There is a board book edition.

The book was a recipient of a 1957 Caldecott Honor for its illustrations.
