= Checkmate to Murder =

1944 novel

- First edition
- Author: E.C.R. Lorac
- Cover artist: J.Z. Atkinson
- Language: English
- Series: Chief Inspector MacDonald
- Genre: Detective
- Publisher: Collins Crime Club; Arcadia House (US)
- Publication date: 1944
- Publication place: United Kingdom
- Media type: Print
- Preceded by: Fell Murder
- Followed by: Murder by Matchlight

Checkmate to Murder is a 1944 detective novel by E.C.R. Lorac, the pen name of the British writer Edith Caroline Rivett. It was the twenty fifth in her long-running series featuring Chief Inspector MacDonald of Scotland Yard. Originally published by Collins Crime Club, it was reissued in 2020 by the British Library Publishing as part of a group of crime novels from the Golden Age of Detective Fiction.

== Synopsis ==
On a foggy night during the London Blitz, a special constable arrests a young Canadian soldier standing over the dead body of his elderly great uncle in a rundown house in Hampstead. The only other possible suspects are the inhabitants of the art studio next door, a celebrated painter, his sister and their various guests. However as MacDonald and his assistant Inspector Reeves begin to investigate a number of other possible suspects and motives emerge, including the special constable himself.

== Bibliography ==
- Nichols, Victoria & Thompson, Susan. Silk Stalkings: More Women Write of Murder. Scarecrow Press, 1998.
- Reilly, John M. Twentieth Century Crime & Mystery Writers. Springer, 2015.
