= The Case of Colonel Marchand =

1933 novel

- American first edition
- Author: E.C.R. Lorac
- Language: English
- Series: Chief Inspector MacDonald
- Genre: Detective
- Publisher: Sampson Low (UK); Macauley (US)
- Publication date: 1933
- Publication place: United Kingdom
- Media type: Print
- Preceded by: The Greenwell Mystery
- Followed by: Death on the Oxford Road

The Case of Colonel Marchand is a 1933 detective novel by E.C.R. Lorac, the pen name of the British writer Edith Caroline Rivett. It is the fourth book featuring Chief Inspector MacDonald of Scotland Yard who appeared in a lengthy series of novels during the Golden Age of Detective Fiction.

== Synopsis ==
Colonel Marchand is found dead, apparently from cyanide poisoning, after hosting an attractive young woman for tea. There are numerous potential suspects including his various servants, secretary and his spendthrift heir.

== Bibliography ==
- Cooper, John & Pike, B.A. Artists in Crime: An Illustrated Survey of Crime Fiction First Edition Dustwrappers, 1920-1970. Scolar Press, 1995.
- Hubin, Allen J. Crime Fiction, 1749-1980: A Comprehensive Bibliography. Garland Publishing, 1984.
- Nichols, Victoria & Thompson, Susan. Silk Stalkings: More Women Write of Murder. Scarecrow Press, 1998.
- Reilly, John M. Twentieth Century Crime & Mystery Writers. Springer, 2015.
