= Still Waters (novel) =

1949 novel

- First edition
- Author: E. C. R. Lorac
- Language: English
- Series: Chief Inspector MacDonald
- Genre: Detective
- Publisher: Collins Crime Club
- Publication date: 1949
- Publication place: United Kingdom
- Media type: Print
- Preceded by: Part for a Poisoner
- Followed by: Policemen in the Precinct

Still Waters is a 1949 detective novel by E. C. R. Lorac, the pen name of the British writer Edith Caroline Rivett. It is the thirty second in her long-running series featuring Chief Inspector MacDonald of Scotland Yard, one of the more orthodox detectives of the Golden Age of Detective Fiction.

== Synopsis ==
It was one of several novels Lorac set in the Lancashire fell country around Lunesdale where she spent much of her time. It follows a woman who buys a farm near a former quarry and begins experiencing a series of strange events, and it seems she may be the victim of other potential owners of the farm who linger in the area.

== Bibliography ==
- Cooper, John & Pike, B. A. Artists in Crime: An Illustrated Survey of Crime Fiction First Edition Dustwrappers, 1920-1970. Scolar Press, 1995.
- Hubin, Allen J. Crime Fiction, 1749-1980: A Comprehensive Bibliography. Garland Publishing, 1984.
- Nichols, Victoria & Thompson, Susan. Silk Stalkings: More Women Write of Murder. Scarecrow Press, 1998.
- Reilly, John M. Twentieth Century Crime & Mystery Writers. Springer, 2015.
