= The Murder on the Burrows =

1931 novel

- First edition (UK)
- Author: E.C.R. Lorac
- Language: English
- Series: Chief Inspector MacDonald
- Genre: Detective
- Publisher: Sampson Low (UK); MaCauley (US)
- Publication date: 1931
- Publication place: United Kingdom
- Media type: Print
- Followed by: The Affair on Thor's Head

The Murder on the Burrows is a 1931 detective story by E.C.R. Lorac, the pen name of the British writer Edith Caroline Rivett. Her debut novel, it introduced the character of Chief Inspector MacDonald of Scotland Yard who went on to appear in a lengthy series of novels during the Golden Age of Detective Fiction. Although initially named James this is changed to Robert in later books. It takes place around Bideford Bay in North Devon where the author had spent several holidays.

== Synopsis ==
An abandoned car with a body is discovered on Northam Burrows. The dead man proves to be a communist whose political associations in London may or may not have led to his death.

== Bibliography ==
- Cooper, John & Pike, B.A. Artists in Crime: An Illustrated Survey of Crime Fiction First Edition Dustwrappers, 1920-1970. Scolar Press, 1995.
- Hubin, Allen J. Crime Fiction, 1749-1980: A Comprehensive Bibliography. Garland Publishing, 1984.
- James, Russell. Great British Fictional Detectives. Remember When, 21 Apr 2009.
- Nichols, Victoria & Thompson, Susan. Silk Stalkings: More Women Write of Murder. Scarecrow Press, 1998.
- Reilly, John M. Twentieth Century Crime & Mystery Writers. Springer, 2015.
