= Crossed Skis =

1952 novel

- First edition
- Author: Carol Carnac
- Language: English
- Series: Inspector Julian Rivers
- Genre: Detective
- Publisher: Collins Crime Club
- Publication date: 1952
- Publication place: United Kingdom
- Media type: Print
- Preceded by: It's Her Own Funeral
- Followed by: Murder as a Fine Art

Crossed Skis is a 1952 detective novel by Carol Carnac, the pen name of the British writer Edith Caroline Rivett. It features the character of Inspector Julian Rivers of Scotland Yard, who appeared in fourteen novels by Carnac who under the name E.C.R. Lorac also wrote the better-known series featuring Chief Inspector MacDonald. Originally published by Collins Crime Club, it was reissued in 2020 by the British Library Publishing as part of a group of crime novels from the Golden Age of Detective Fiction.

== Synopsis ==
The investigation of a dead body in London's Bloomsbury takes Rivers to the Austrian Alps to hunt down the murderer amidst the visitors to a ski resort.

== Bibliography ==
- Cooper, John & Pike, B.A. Artists in Crime: An Illustrated Survey of Crime Fiction First Edition Dustwrappers, 1920-1970. Scolar Press, 1995.
- Hubin, Allen J. Crime Fiction, 1749-1980: A Comprehensive Bibliography. Garland Publishing, 1984.
- Nichols, Victoria & Thompson, Susan. Silk Stalkings: More Women Write of Murder. Scarecrow Press, 1998.
- Reilly, John M. Twentieth Century Crime & Mystery Writers. Springer, 2015.
