= Death on the Oxford Road =

1933 novel

- First edition
- Author: E.C.R. Lorac
- Language: English
- Series: Chief Inspector MacDonald
- Genre: Detective
- Publisher: Sampson Low
- Publication date: 1933
- Publication place: United Kingdom
- Media type: Print
- Preceded by: The Case of Colonel Marchand
- Followed by: Murder in St. John's Wood

Death on the Oxford Road is a 1933 detective novel by E.C.R. Lorac, the pen name of the British writer Edith Caroline Rivett. It is the fifth book featuring Chief Inspector MacDonald of Scotland Yard who appeared in a lengthy series of novels during the Golden Age of Detective Fiction.

== Synopsis ==
On a dark night on a lonely spot on the Oxford Road a body is dumped out of a motor car. Unfortunately for the murderers MacDonald happens to be close by and leads the investigation that will eventually catch them.

== Bibliography ==
- Cooper, John & Pike, B.A. Artists in Crime: An Illustrated Survey of Crime Fiction First Edition Dustwrappers, 1920-1970. Scolar Press, 1995.
- Hubin, Allen J. Crime Fiction, 1749-1980: A Comprehensive Bibliography. Garland Publishing, 1984.
- Nichols, Victoria & Thompson, Susan. Silk Stalkings: More Women Write of Murder. Scarecrow Press, 1998.
- Reilly, John M. Twentieth Century Crime & Mystery Writers. Springer, 2015.
