= Pierre Schaeffer bibliography =

Pierre Schaeffer
- Born: Pierre Henri Marie Schaeffer; August 14, 1910; Nancy, Lorraine, France
- Died: August 19, 1995 (aged 85); Aix, Provence, France
- Occupations: Composer, musician, writer, engineer, professor, broadcaster, acoustician, musicologist, activist, record producer, inventor, entrepreneur, cultural critic
- Spouses: Elisabeth Schmitt, Jacqueline de Lisle
- Children: Marie-Claire Schaeffer, Justine Schaeffer
- Writing career
- Genres: Short story, essay/treatise, christian novel, plays, nonfiction novel, columns, journals/memoirs
- Subjects: Music theory, musical criticism, musical philosophy, cultural criticism, acoustics, music technology, semiotics, communications, science
- Notable work: In Search of a Concrete Music
- Website: pierreschaeffer.com

The bibliography of Pierre Schaeffer is a list of the fictional and nonfictional writings of the electroacoustic musician-theoretician and pioneer of musique concrète, Pierre Schaeffer.

== List ==
=== Fiction ===
==== Novels and short stories ====
- The Choirboys (1949) not choir but heart (same vocal word in French)
- The Old Man and His Movements (1964)
- The Guardian of The Volcano (1969)
- Excuse Me, I'm Dying and Other Fabulations (1981)
- Prelude, Choral and Fugue (1981)
- Faber and Sapiens (1986)

==== Plays ====
- Tobie (1939)
- Secular Games (1946)

=== Non-fiction ===
- Clotaire Nicole (1934)
- America, We Ignore You (1946)
- In Search of a Concrete Music (1952)
- Towards an Experimental Music: Under the Direction of Pierre Schaeffer (1957) *
- Treatise on Musical Objects (1966)
- Concrete Music (1967)
- Music and Acoustics (1967)
- The Future Backwards (1970)
- Machines for Communicating 1. Genesis of Simulacra (1970)
- From Musical Experience to the Human Experience (1971)
- The Service of Research: Structures and Orientation (1974)

* An expanded version published by Richard-Masse later in 1957, based upon the article of the same name. (See "Towards an Experimental Music" below, under heading "Articles and essays".)

==== Articles and essays ====
- Basic Truths ("Revue Musicale"; 1938)
- The Non-Visual Element of Films ("Revue du cinéma"; 1946)
- Introduction to Concrete Music ("Polyphonie"; 1950)
- To Give Ear, To Give Thought ("The Nave"; 1951)
- The Musical Object ("Revue Musicale"; 1952)
- The Experience of Concrete Music (1952)
- Towards an Experimental Music ("Revue Musicale"; 1957) *
- Musical Experiences. Music More Concrete, More Electronic, More Exotic ("Revue Musicale"; 1959)
- Experiences in Paris, June 1959 ("Revue Musicale"; 1959)
- The Old Man (1964)
- New Reflections on the Communication[s] Triangle ("Les cahiers de la télévision"; 1969)
- Machines for Communicating ("Bulletin of the French Corporation of Philosophy"; 1970)
- Music and Computers ("Revue Musicale"; 1971)
- The Press of Television: A Mediator ("UER"; 1971)
- Society in the Mirror ("La jaune et la rouge"; 1971)
- Music for the Year 2000 ("Etudes"; 1971)
- The Communication[s] Triangle ("Notebooks of the Canadian Cultural Center"; 1971)
- Development of Public Service Television Networks: Prospects, Symptoms and Basic Assumptions (1972)
- Letter to the Researchers of Men ("Mail of the CNRS"; 1972)
- Machines for Communicating, Machines for Calculating ("IBM Computers", 1972)
- The Television in Public Services ("Communication and Languages"; 1972)
- Sound and Communication ("Cultures"; 1973)
- The Audiovisual: Method of Communication or Common Knowledge?
  ("Swiss-French Economics"; 1973)
- In Search of Music Itself ("Revue Musicale Swiss"; 1975)
- Darwin and Marconi or the End of Television ("The Imaginaries", 1976)

* An article published 1957, later that year expanded into a book of the same name. (See "Towards an Experimental Music: Under the Direction of Pierre Schaeffer" above, under heading "Non-fiction".)

=== Collaborative works ===
- Conversations with Pierre Schaeffer (Marc Pierret; 1969)
- Pierre Schaeffer followed by Reflections of Pierre Schaeffer (Sophie Brunet; 1969)
- Machines for Communicating 2. Power and Communication (Sophie Brunet; 1972)
- The Regulation of Microbic Sporulation (Jekisiel Szulmajster, J.P. Aubert; 1973)
- The Semiotics of Representation: Theatre, Television, and Comics (1975)
- Pierre Schaeffer: From Concrete Music to Music Itself (Sophie Brunet; 1977)
- The Antennas of Jericho (Claude Glayman; 1978)
- Guide to Acoustic Objects: Pierre Schaeffer and Musical Research (Michel Chion; 1983)
- The Gentle Revolution: Musique Concrète (Linda G. Witnov; 1985)
- A Visit to Brangues: Conversations Between Paul Claudel, Jacques Madaule and Pierre Schaeffer (Paul Claudel, Jaques Madaule; 2005)
