= Murder as a Fine Art =

1953 novel

- First edition
- Author: Carol Carnac
- Language: English
- Series: Inspector Julian Rivers
- Genre: Detective
- Publisher: Collins
- Publication date: 1953
- Publication place: United Kingdom
- Media type: Print
- Preceded by: Crossed Skis
- Followed by: A Policeman at the Door

Murder as a Fine Art is a 1953 detective novel by Carol Carnac, the pen name of the British writer Edith Caroline Rivett. It is the ninth of fourteen novels featuring the character of Inspector Julian Rivers of Scotland Yard.

== Synopsis ==
The newly formed Ministry of Fine Arts is seemingly a cursed institution. The first minister dies just after taking office and a second not long afterwards. A third death occurs when a huge bust topples down and crushes Edwin Pompfret the permanent secretary of the department.

== Bibliography ==
- Cooper, John & Pike, B.A. Artists in Crime: An Illustrated Survey of Crime Fiction First Edition Dustwrappers, 1920-1970. Scolar Press, 1995.
- Hubin, Allen J. Crime Fiction, 1749-1980: A Comprehensive Bibliography. Garland Publishing, 1984.
- Nichols, Victoria & Thompson, Susan. Silk Stalkings: More Women Write of Murder. Scarecrow Press, 1998.
- Reilly, John M. Twentieth Century Crime & Mystery Writers. Springer, 2015.
