= In Search of a Concrete Music =

- First edition
- Author: Pierre Schaeffer
- Original title: À la recherche d'une musique concrète
- Language: French
- Subject: Musique concrète, acoustics, music theory, music technology
- Genre: Treatise, journal
- Published: 1952 Éditions du Seuil
- Publication place: France
- Media type: Print (paperback)
- Pages: 228
- ISBN: 978-2-02-002572-0
- OCLC: 1705595

In Search of a Concrete Music (French: À la recherche d'une musique concrète), written and published in 1952, is a French language publication which forms a major part of the experimental composer and theoretician Pierre Schaeffer's collection of works written to record his own undertakings on the development of musique concrète.

The collection is discussed, among other works of Schaeffer's, in chapter two of Robert Martial's Pierre Schaeffer, des transmissions à Orphée.

In this text, some have suggested, Schaeffer imagined a computerized music studio:

La cohérence de cette perspective nous mène […] aux machines de la cybernétique. Seules en effet, des machines de ce genre (probablement de plusieurs tonnes et coûtant des centaines de millions!), que des circuits oscillants dotent d’une certaine mémoire, permettront le jeu infini des combinaisons numériques complexes qui sont la clé de tous les phénomènes musicaux.

(The coherence of this perspective leads us to cybernetic machines. Indeed, only machines of this type (probably weighing several tons and costing hundreds of millions!), with oscillating circuits equipped with a certain memory, will permit endless play with complex numerical combinations, which are the key to all musical phenomena.)

— (Schaeffer 1952, p.119, quoted in Delalande's "D’une technologie à l’autre" -see below).

== Contents ==
- DÉDICACE
- 1ER JOURNAL, 1948–1949
- 2E JOURNAL, 1950–1951
- 3 EXPÉRIENCE CONCRÈTE, 1952
- 4 ESQUISSE D'UN SOLFÈGE CONCRET
