= E. C. R. Lorac =

British writer

Edith Caroline Rivett
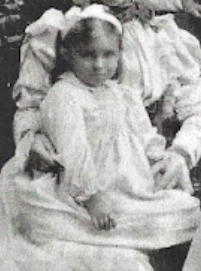
- E. C. R. Lorac as a child, late 1890s
- Born: 6 May 1894; Hendon, Middlesex, England
- Died: 2 July 1958 (aged 64); Caton-with-Littledale, England
- Occupations: Novelist; short story writer
- Writing career
- Pen name: E. C. R. Lorac; Carol Carnac; Mary Le Bourne
- Genres: Murder mystery; detective story; crime fiction; thriller
- Movement: Golden Age of Detective Fiction

Edith Caroline Rivett (6 May 1894 – 2 July 1958) was a British crime writer, who wrote under the pseudonyms E. C. R. Lorac, Carol Carnac and Mary Le Bourne during the golden age of detective fiction. Her first novel was The Murder on the Burrows (1931).

== Life and career ==
=== Childhood ===
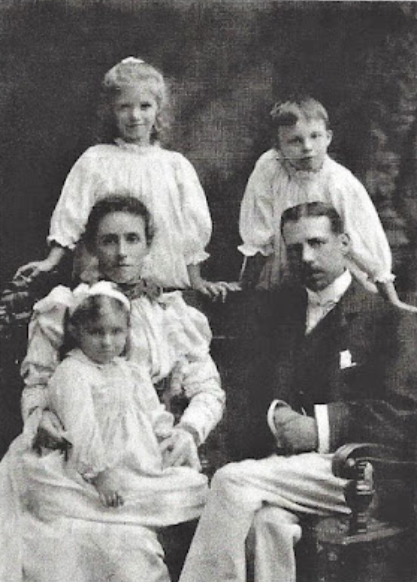
Harry and Beatrice Rivett in the 1890s with their daughters: Gladys upper left, Maud upper right, Carol seated

The youngest daughter of Harry (1861–1900) and Beatrice Rivett (née Foot; 1868–1943), Edith was born in Hendon, Middlesex, (now London) on 6 May 1894. She had two sisters, Gladys and Maud. In 1898 the family emigrated to Australia, for warm weather to treat Harry Rivett's tuberculosis. This was unsuccessful, and in 1900 the family returned, travelling on the SS Illawarra. Harry Rivett died on the voyage, and was buried at sea.

When the family reached London, they were literally penniless but were received into the welcoming, if crowded, household of Beatrice Rivett's father, Edward Foot, and the widow found employment as an assistant rate collector. Edith attended South Hampstead High School, and the Central School of Arts and Crafts in London and she continued as a craft practitioner throughout her life; her work included embroidery and calligraphy that has been on display at Westminster Abbey.

=== Literary career ===
She published her first detective novel in 1931; this was The Murder on the Burrows, a well-crafted debut which launched her detective Macdonald on a career that was to last for more than a quarter of a century. Nine Lorac novels were published by Sampson Low, earning increasingly favourable reviews, before she moved to the more prestigious imprint of Collins Crime Club in 1936, with Crime Counter Crime, set during a General Election. She remained a Crime Club stalwart for the rest of her life.

John Curran, historian of the Crime Club, argues that she was especially well served by the designers of the cover artwork for her books, and this is no doubt one of the factors that has made her work especially collectable. First editions in the attractive dust jackets of the period can now change hands—on the rare occasions when they come on to the market—for thousands of pounds.

She was equally at home with urban and rural settings. Her early books include Murder in St John’s Wood and Murder in Chelsea, while two other books set in London, Bats in the Belfry and the war-time mystery Murder by Matchlight.

Like Rosanne Manaton, a character in her Checkmate to Murder, she was artistic and had an interest in ski-ing; the winter sport plays a central part in her Carol Carnac novel Crossed Skis, also published by the British Library. In November 1940, having been evacuated to Devon, she wrote to a friend about the horrors of living through a war. Referring to the death of one of her oldest friends, killed while fire-fighting, she said: “Most of my other friends have been bombed or burnt out of their homes. What a sickening insanity it all is.”

=== Personal life and death ===
Remaining unmarried, she lived her last years with her elder sister, Gladys Rivett (1891–1966), in the village of Aughton, in Lonsdale, Lancashire. She became a popular figure in the village while continuing to work productively as a detective novelist. To this day, she is remembered in the local community as spirited and strong-willed, a woman with a strong social conscience. Edith Rivett died at the Caton Green Nursing Home, Caton-with-Littledale, near Lancaster. According to the probate records for her will, she left an estate valued at £10,602, 16 shillings [about £250,000 in 2020]. Rivett is buried in the churchyard at St Saviour's Church, Aughton.

Westminster Abbey holds a number of works by the Sheffield-trained silversmith Omar Ramsden. One of these was given by Miss Carol Rivett in memory of her grandfather, Edward Smith Foot. It is a silver alms dish of hammer and repousse work. She also donated a tunicle (the vestment worn by a subdeacon) to the Abbey.

=== Legacy ===
As of 2021, the British Library has included eight novels by E.C.R. Lorac in its "Crime Classics" series of re-issued works: Fire in the Thatch; Bats in the Belfry; Murder by Matchlight; Murder in the Mill-Race; Fell Murder; Checkmate to Murder; Post After Post Mortem and Crossed Skis. A previously unpublished late work, Two-Way Murder, was added in 2021; the original manuscript was under a new pen name, 'Mary le Bourne', but has been published by the British Library as by E.C.R. Lorac. The back cover of the re-issued, Fire in the Thatch: A Devon Mystery (originally published in 1946), declares that, "Her books have been almost entirely neglected since her death, but deserve rediscovery as fine examples of classic British crime fiction in its golden age." In August 2024, an English Heritage plaque was unveiled at Newbanks Cottage in Aughton, UK, the former residence of Rivett.

== Bibliography ==
=== Novels ===
==== As E. C. R. Lorac ====
Most of these books feature her main series character, Chief Inspector Robert Macdonald, a "London Scot" and an avowed bachelor with a love for walking in the English countryside. In 28 of these books, he has the help of his assistant, Detective Inspector Reeves.

- The Murder on the Burrows (1931)
- The Affair on Thor's Head (1932)
- The Greenwell Mystery (1932)
- The Case of Colonel Marchand (1933)
- Death on the Oxford Road (1933)
- Murder in St. John's Wood (1934)
- Murder in Chelsea (1934)
- The Organ Speaks (1935)
- Death of an Author (1935) not featuring MacDonald
- Crime Counter Crime (1936)
- A Pall for a Painter (1936)
- Post After Post-Mortem (1936)
- These Names Make Clues (1937)
- Bats in the Belfry (1937)
- The Devil and the C.I.D. (1938)
- Slippery Staircase (1938)
- John Brown's Body (1939)
- Black Beadle (1939)
- Tryst for a Tragedy (1940)
- Death at Dyke's Corner (1940)
- Case in the Clinic (1941)
- Rope's End, Rogue's End (1942)
- The Sixteenth Stair (1942)
- Death Came Softly (1943)
- Fell Murder (1944) [agricultural setting in Lancashire]
- Checkmate to Murder (1944)
- Murder by Matchlight (1945)
- Fire in the Thatch (1946)
- The Theft of the Iron Dogs (1946); U.S. title Murderer's Mistake (1947)
- Relative to Poison (1947)
- Death Before Dinner (1948); U.S. title A Screen for Murder (1948)
- Part for a Poisoner (1948); U.S. title Place for a Poisoner (1948)
- Still Waters (1949)
- Policemen in the Precinct (1949); U.S. title And Then Put Out the Light (1949)
- Accident by Design (1950)
- Murder of a Martinet (1951); U.S. title I Could Murder Her (1951)
- The Dog It Was That Died (1952)
- Murder in the Mill-Race (1952); U.S. title Speak Justly of the Dead (1953)
- Crook O'Lune (1953); U.S. title Shepherd's Crook (1953)
- Shroud of Darkness (1954)
- Let Well Alone (1954)
- Ask a Policeman (1955)
- Murder in Vienna (1956)
- Dangerous Domicile (1957)
- Picture of Death (1957)
- Murder on a Monument (1958)
- Death in Triplicate (1958) Non-MacDonald story featuring Superintendent Kempson; U.S. title People Will Talk (1958)
- Dishonour Among Thieves (1959); U.S. title The Last Escape (1959)
- Two-Way Murder (published posthumously in 2021)

==== As Carol Carnac ====
They feature three different series characters. The first one is Inspector Ryvet, a homophonous allusion to her own surname. The other two are Chief Inspector Julian Rivers (who appears in 15 books), and his assistant, Inspector Lancing, who appears in 18 cases (four of them with Ryvet.)

- Triple Death (1936)
- Murder at Mornington (1937)
- The Missing Rope (1937)
- When the Devil Was Sick (1939)
- The Case of the First Class Carriage (1939)
- Death in the Diving Pool (1940)
- A Double for Detection (1945)
- The Striped Suitcase (1946)
- Clue Sinister (1947)
- Over the Garden Wall (1948)
- Upstairs Downstairs (1950)
- Copy for Crime (1950)
- It's Her Own Funeral (1951)
- Crossed Skis (1952)
- Murder as a Fine Art (1953)
- A Policeman at the Door (1953)
- Impact of Evidence (1954)
- Murder among Members (1955)
- Rigging the Evidence (1955)
- The Double Turn (1956)
- The Burning Question (1957)
- Long Shadows (1958) (U.S. title: Affair at Helen's Court)
- Death of a Lady Killer (1959)

==== As Mary Le Bourne ====
- Two-Way Murder (2021)

==== As Carol Rivett ====
- Outer Circle (1939)
- A Time Remembered (1940)
- Island Spell (1951)

==== Unpublished novels ====
- Forty Years On.
- [Untitled]. An unfinished detective story.

=== Short stories ===
- 'Chance Is a Great Thing'. (London) Evening Standard, 8 August 1950.
- 'Remember to Ring Twice'. MacKill's Mystery Magazine, September 1952.
- 'Death at the Bridge Table'. MacKill's Mystery Magazine, October 1952.
- 'Permanent Policeman'. MacKill's Mystery Magazine, March 1953.
- 'A Bit of Wire-Pulling'. The Saint Detective Magazine, October 1955.
- 'Half-Term Hold-Up'.

== Radio and stage plays ==
=== Radio play ===
- 'Bubble, Bubble, Toil and Trouble'. BBC Light Programme (Mystery Playhouse presents 'THE DETECTION CLUB'), 17 February 1948.

=== Stage plays and sketches ===
- 'Death in Park Lane'. Dorchester Hotel, Park Lane, London, 13 July 1951. A single performance presented by St James Theatre Company at a luncheon to mark the 21st anniversary of Collins Crime Club imprint.
