= 1876 in literature =

This article contains information about the literary events and publications of 1876.

== Events ==
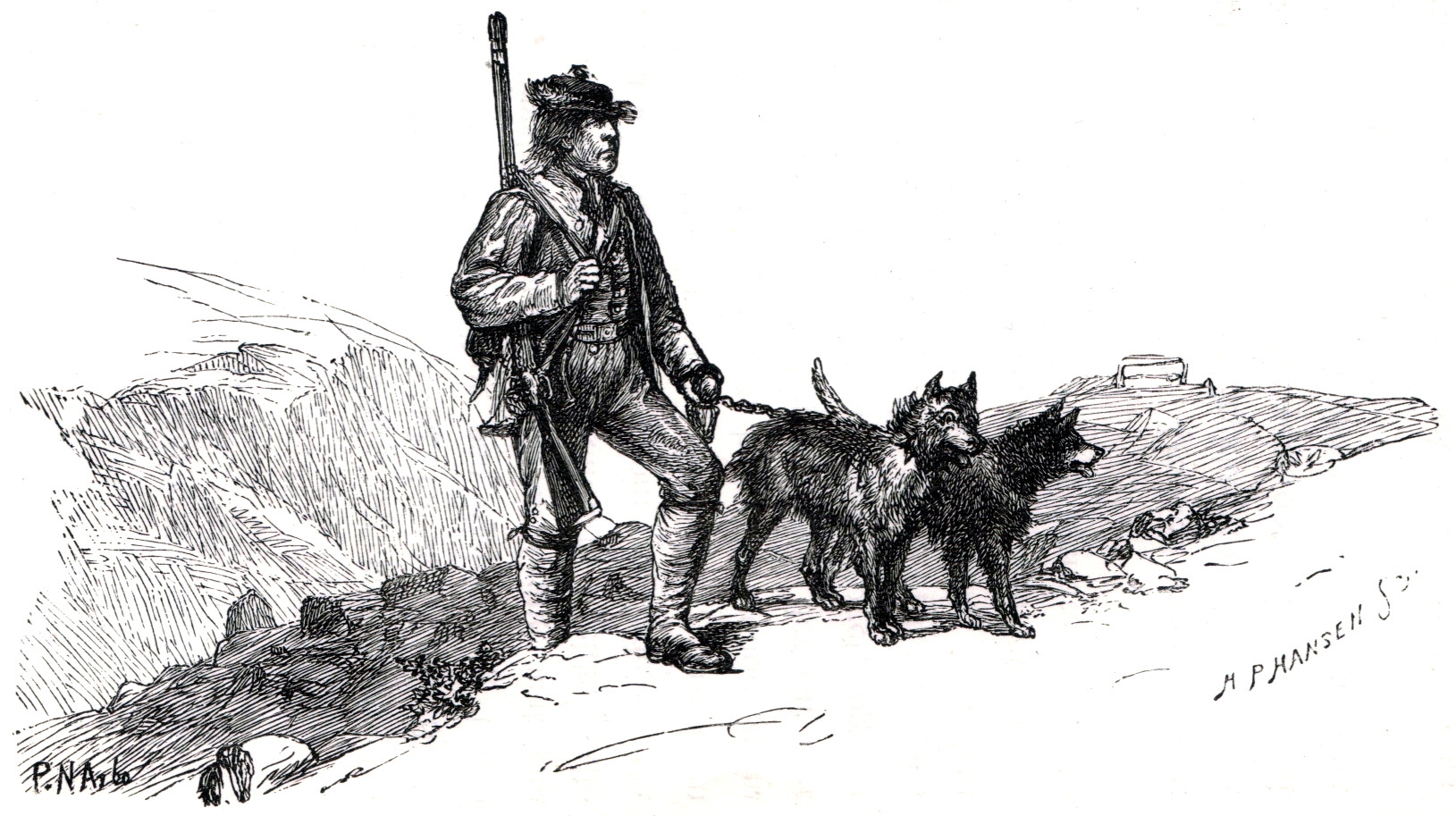
Per Gynt, the hero of the folk-story that Henrik Ibsen loosely based Peer Gynt on

- February 24 – The stage premiere of the verse-play Peer Gynt by Henrik Ibsen (published 1867) with incidental music by Edvard Grieg, takes place in Christiania, Norway.
- February/March – The Harvard Lampoon humor magazine is founded in Cambridge, Massachusetts.
- March 14 – Biblioteca Nazionale Centrale di Roma established in Rome.
- March
  - American librarian Melvil Dewey first publishes the Dewey Decimal Classification system.
  - George Bernard Shaw moves permanently from Dublin to England, after which he begins his writing career as the ghostwriter of a musical column in London satirical weekly The Hornet.
- April – Émile Zola's L'Assommoir begins serialization in Le Bien public. Its low-life themes cause it to be suspended after six episodes; serialization resumes in July in La République des lettres.
- May 30 – The Ems Ukaz, a secret decree, is issued by Tsar Alexander II of Russia in the German city of Bad Ems, aimed at stopping the printing and distribution of Ukrainian-language publications in the Russian Empire.
- May – April Uprising of 1876: Bulgarian poet Hristo Botev leads a party of émigré revolutionaries against Ottoman forces in Bulgaria but is shot and killed on June 1 (May 20 O.S.).
- July – William Heffer takes over his first bookshop in Cambridge (England), primarily as a stationer at this date.
- October 6 – The American Library Association is founded in Philadelphia.
- December – The first United States edition of Mark Twain's first individual extended work of fiction, the Bildungsroman The Adventures of Tom Sawyer, illustrated by True Williams, is published by the American Publishing Company. An authorised non-illustrated British edition has appeared in early June from Chatto & Windus in London (with the first review appearing on June 24 in a British magazine) and pirated editions have appeared in Canada and Germany.
- unknown dates
  - The first (1594) edition of Christopher Marlowe's play Edward II is discovered.
  - The Théâtre des Bouffes du Nord opens in Paris.

== New books ==
=== Fiction ===
- W. H. Ainsworth
  - Chetwynd Calverley
  - The Leaguer of Lathom
- Machado de Assis – Helena
- Isabella Banks (Mrs. G. Linnæus Banks) – The Manchester Man
- Walter Besant and James Rice – The Golden Butterfly
- Mary Elizabeth Braddon – Dead Men's Shoes
- Rhoda Broughton – Joan
- Robert Buchanan – The Shadow of the Sword
- Wilkie Collins – The Two Destinies
- Alphonse Daudet – Jack
- Swarnakumari Devi – Deepnirban
- Fyodor Dostoevsky – A Gentle Creature
- George Eliot – Daniel Deronda
- George Meredith – "Beauchamp's Career"
- Benito Pérez Galdós – Doña Perfecta
- John Habberton – Helen's Babies
- Thomas Hardy – The Hand of Ethelberta
- Joris-Karl Huysmans – Martha
- Helen Hunt Jackson – Mercy Philbrick's Choice
- Jens Peter Jacobsen – Fru Marie Grubbe
- Herman Melville – Clarel
- Anthony Trollope – The Prime Minister (complete in book form)
- Jules Verne – Michael Strogoff
- Charlotte M. Yonge – The Three Brides
- Émile Zola – Son Excellence Eugène Rougon

=== Children and young people ===
- Louisa May Alcott – Rose in Bloom
- Mark Twain – The Adventures of Tom Sawyer

=== Drama ===
- Émile Augier – Madame Caverlet
- Rosario de Acuña – Rienzi el tribuno
- W. S. Gilbert – Dan'l Druce, Blacksmith
- Julius Villiam Gudmand-Høyer – Sorte Ellen og Hendes Søn
- Henrik Ibsen – Peer Gynt

=== Poetry ===
- Robert Browning - Pacchiarotto
- Lewis Carroll – The Hunting of the Snark
- Edward Lear – Laughable Lyrics (published December, dated 1877)
- Julia A. Moore – The Sentimental Song Book

=== Non-fiction ===
- Michael Foster – Textbook of Physiology
- William Ewart Gladstone – Bulgarian Horrors
- Francis Tilney Bassett – The Catholic Epistle of St. James
- Professor Louis Hoffmann (Angelo John Lewis) – Modern Magic
- Søren Kierkegaard (died 1855) – Judge for Yourselves! (Dømmer selv!)
- Friedrich Nietzsche – Untimely Meditations (Unzeitgemässe Betrachtungen)
- Robert's Rules of Order
- George Smith (ed.) – The Chaldean Account of Genesis

== Births ==
- January 4 – Paola Drigo, Italian writer (died 1938)
- January 12 – Jack London, American writer (died 1916)
- February 11 – Mary Frances Dowdall, English novelist and non-fiction writer (died 1939)
- February 16 – G. M. Trevelyan, English historian (died 1962)
- March 4 – Léon-Paul Fargue, French poet (died 1947)
- April 13 – Sidney Bradshaw Fay American historian (died 1967)
- April 22 – Ole Edvart Rolvaag, Norwegian-American writer (died 1931)
- May 10 – Ivan Cankar, Slovene dramatist and poet (died 1918)
- June 2 – Konstantin Trenyov, Russian dramatist (died 1945)
- July 1 – Susan Glaspell, American playwright and novelist (died 1948)
- July 12 – Max Jacob, French poet (died 1944)
- September 13 – Sherwood Anderson, American novelist (died 1941)
- October 31 – Natalie Clifford Barney, American writer and patron (died 1972)
- November 15 – Anna de Noailles, French writer (died 1933)
- December 22:
  - Filippo Tommaso Marinetti, Italian poet, art theorist and Futurist writer (died 1944)
  - Thomas Mofolo, Sotho novelist (died 1948)

== Deaths ==
- January 7 – Juste Olivier, Swiss poet (born 1807)
- January 19 – George Julius Poulett Scrope, English political economist (born 1797)
- February 1 – Meenakshi Sundaram Pillai, Tamil scholar and poet (born 1815)
- February 3 – Gino Capponi, Italian historian (born 1792)
- February 6 – Georgiana Chatterton, English novelist and travel writer (born 1806)
- February 27 – Afanasy Shchapov, Russian historian (born 1830)
- March 2 – Johannes Falke, German historian (born 1823)
- March 9 – Louise Colet, French poet (born 1810)
- May 7 – William Buell Sprague, American biographer (born 1795)
- May 13 – Joshua Hobson, English pamphleteer (born 1810)
- May 24 – Henry Kingsley, English novelist (born 1830)
- May 26 – František Palacký, Czech historian (born 1798)
- June 8 – George Sand, French novelist (born 1804)
- June 20 – John Neal, American novelist and critic (born 1793)
- June 27 – Harriet Martineau, English philosopher and social theorist (born 1802)
- July 14 – James Henry, Irish poet and scholar (born 1798)
- July 24 – John William Kaye, English military historian (born 1814)
- July 25 – Robert Caesar Childers, French-born English orientalist (born 1838)
- October 7 – Georg Heinrich Pertz, German historian (born 1795)
- November 24 – Maria Francesca Rossetti, English critic and translator (born 1827)
- November 28 – Chandos Wren-Hoskyns, English agricultural writer and landowner (born 1812)
- December 30 – Christian Winther, Danish lyric poet (born 1796)
