= Patrick O'Connell (poet) =

Canadian poet (1944–2005)

Patrick O'Connell (1944–2005) was a Canadian poet.

Born in Winnipeg, Manitoba, he was educated at the University of Manitoba. In 1993, he was the winner of the John Hirsch Award for Most Promising New Writer.

== Bibliography ==
- Hoping for Angels (1990) ISBN 0-88801-151-2
- Falling in Place (1993) ISBN 0-88801-173-3
- The Joy that Cracked the Mountain (1999) ISBN 1-896239-52-8
