= Mother Goose (Tudor book) =

1944 Picture book

- First edition
- Author: Tasha Tudor
- Publisher: Oxford University Press
- Publication date: 1944
- Pages: unpaged
- Awards: Caldecott Honor

Mother Goose is a 1944 picture book by Tasha Tudor. Tudor illustrated 76 Mother Goose nursery rhymes. The book was a recipient of a 1945 Caldecott Honor for its illustrations.
