= The Malediction =

1952 novel by Jean Giono

- First US edition
- Author: Jean Giono
- Original title: Le Moulin de Pologne
- Translator: Peter de Mendelssohn
- Language: French
- Publisher: Éditions Gallimard
- Publication date: 1952
- Publication place: France
- English publication date: 1955, Criterion Books, US
- Pages: 236

The Malediction (French: Le Moulin de Pologne) is a 1952 novel by the French writer Jean Giono. It tells the story of a landowning family in Provence. The family suffers under a curse which takes different forms over the generations. An English translation by Peter de Mendelssohn was published in 1955.

== Reception ==
Laurent LeSage of The Saturday Review called Giono "France's greatest living regionalist writer", and wrote about the book: "The Schicksalstragodie combines with a comedy of provincial manners acted out by the stock characters of tradesfolk, better families, marriageable daughters, etc. But there are no pretty bucolic characters of Giono's earlier style among these brutes who feed on scandal and torment the innocent." LeSage continued: "The new Giono is very much to our taste. His philosophy and his art indicate a rich maturity. It is pleasant to know that he has in mind writing many more chronicles like The Malediction."
