= Tasha Tudor =

American illustrator and writer (1915–2008)

- Tasha Tudor shaving splints from a log on her Vermont farm in 1977
- Born: Starling Burgess; August 28, 1915; Boston, Massachusetts
- Died: June 18, 2008 (aged 92); Marlboro, Vermont
- Occupations: Illustrator, writer
- Writing career
- Period: 20th century
- Genres: Children's books, regional painting
- Subject: New England nostalgia
- Website: tashatudorandfamily.com

Tasha Tudor (August 28, 1915 – June 18, 2008) was an American illustrator and writer of children's books.

== Biography ==
Tasha Tudor was born in Boston, Massachusetts, as Starling Burgess, the daughter of naval architect W. Starling Burgess and noted portrait painter Rosamund Tudor. At birth, she was named "Starling" after her father, but he was an admirer of the War and Peace character Natasha, and his daughter was soon re-christened Natasha, which was later shortened to Tasha. She spent her early years in Marblehead, Massachusetts, before her father's work relocated the family to North Chevy Chase in Maryland to help with the wartime effort.

Tasha’s parents divorced when she was nine, following her mother's rejection of the strict society in Boston in favor of a more Bohemian existence as a painter in Greenwich Village. As a result, Tasha went to live with friends of the family in Redding, Connecticut. Life in this household was far more creative and less structured. Tasha and the other children were largely left to their own devices. Tasha later referred to this unconventional atmosphere as "the best thing that ever happened to me". The children spent much of their time performing scenes from Shakespeare and in plays written by "Aunt Gwen", the household matriarch.

Tasha had developed a strong desire to live an agrarian lifestyle in the New England countryside, and she worked to advance her dream even while still young. In her teen years she earned and saved enough pocket money to purchase a cow she named Delilah.

When socializing with her mother's friends, Tudor was usually introduced as "Rosamund Tudor's daughter, Tasha", leading others to believe that her last name was Tudor. Liking the sound of it, she adopted the name and eventually changed her surname legally following her second divorce. She married Thomas McCready in 1938 in Redding, Connecticut. Tasha and Thomas McCready purchased a large old farm in Webster, New Hampshire, where four children, Bethany, Seth, Thomas, and Efner, were raised. Her first story, Pumpkin Moonshine, was published in 1938, as a gift for a young niece of her husband. They were divorced in 1961, and her children legally changed their names from McCready to Tudor. A later marriage to Allan John Woods lasted only a brief time.

Tasha Tudor illustrated nearly one hundred books, the last being Corgiville Christmas, released in 2003. Several were collaborative works with a New Hampshire friend Mary Mason Campbell. She also collaborated in 1957 with Nell Dorr to produce the 24-minute 16mm film The Golden Key: Enter the Fantasy World of Tasha Tudor. Tudor lived in Marlboro, Vermont, in a house copied from that of other New Hampshire friends Donn and Doris Purvis. Her sons Seth and Tom built the replication and son Seth lived next door with his family. It is documented in Drawn from New England, and in The Private World of Tasha Tudor. Mother and son as well as daughter Efner, who published a couple of books together with Tasha Tudor, worked closely on family endeavors.

== Awards ==
She received many awards and honors, including Caldecott Honors for Mother Goose in 1945 and 1 Is One in 1957. She received the Regina Medal in 1971 for her contributions to children's literature. Her books feature simple and often rhyming text accompanied by detailed and realistic drawings with soft colors. Text and pictures are often bordered by intricate details such as flowers, birds or other charming objects and animals. The visual or textual content often refers to traditions, artifacts or memories of the 19th century. Her books are highly valued possessions of an appreciative audience—one that has grown since she was first represented in the 1940s by the Pennsylvania shop The Dutch Inn in Mill Hall. She also created thousands of original works of art which appear on Christmas cards, Advent calendars, Valentines, posters, and in other forms. The original art is found in museums, libraries and hundreds of private collections around the world.

One of her most famous books is Corgiville Fair, published in 1971. The first of a series to feature anthropomorphic corgis, the book was extremely popular.

== Later years ==
Tudor toured the country for many years, giving speeches at libraries, colleges and museums. Her last major appearances were at the 1996/97 retrospective exhibition at Colonial Williamsburg. Many of her personal artifacts and doll house objects were shown there as well as the manuscripts and watercolors for Corgiville Fair and A Time to Keep. The original art for these two books belongs to Colonel Thomas Strong Tudor and was loaned through the auspices of the Pierpont Morgan Library. An exhibition celebrating Tudor's holiday artwork and celebrations, "Tasha Tudor's Spirit of the Holidays", was gathered from private collections. The combined large and impressive exhibition was displayed in 2005/06 at the Norman Rockwell Museum, Stockbridge, Massachusetts, and the Henry Ford Museum in Dearborn, Michigan, in 2006/07. It was shown at the Toy and Miniature Museum of Kansas City from November 2007 through March 2008; in Lake Charles, La. during the winter of 2008/09; and at the Museum, Cooperstown, N.Y., Oct. - Dec. 2012. That exhibit included two early oil paintings that Rosamund Tudor created of her daughter c. 1920 and 1930. Many other original paintings and her first miniature illustrated manuscript Hitty's Almanac were included in the 2006 exhibition at the Shelburne Museum in Vermont. The largest extant collection of Tudor books and other materials is in the de Grummond Children's Literature Collection at the University of Southern Mississippi in Hattiesburg. It includes original correspondence and some original art work.

== Death ==
Tasha Tudor died on June 18, 2008, in Marlboro, Vermont. Her estate, valued at over $2 million, was contested by the three children she disinherited. According to the Daily Telegraph: "Her will, written in 2001, left the bulk of the estate to Seth Tudor, 67, and his son Winslow. It left only $1,000 each to Bethany Tudor, 69, and Efner Tudor Holmes, and a piece of antique furniture to younger son Thomas Tudor, 64, because of their 'estrangement' from her". The dispute was settled out of court in 2010.

== Selected books ==
As writer and illustrator

- Pumpkin Moonshine
- Alexander the Gander
- A Tale for Easter
- Snow before Christmas
- Thistly B
- The Dolls' Christmas
- Edgar Allan Crow
- Amanda and the Bear
- A is for Annabelle
- 1 Is One
- A Time to Keep
- Corgiville Fair
- Tasha Tudor's Seasons of Delight
- The Great Corgiville Kidnapping

As illustrator

- Mother Goose, 1944, Oxford University Press
- A Child's Garden of Verses, by Robert Louis Stevenson, 1947, Henry Z. Walck, Inc.
- Increase Rabbit, by Thomas L. McCready, 1958, Ariel Books
- The Secret Garden, by Frances Hodgson Burnett, 1962, Harper & Row Publishers
- A Little Princess, by Frances Hodgson Burnett, 1963, HarperCollins Publishers
- Wings from the Wind: An Anthology of Poems, 1964, J. B. Lippincott
- The Wind in the Willows, by Kenneth Grahame, 1966, World Publishing
- Little Women, by Louisa May Alcott, 1969, World Publishing
- The Night Before Christmas, by Clement Clarke Moore, 1975, Rand McNally & Company
- A Basket of Herbs, by Mary Mason Campbell, 1983, Stephen Greene Press
