= Barbara Erskine =

English novelist

- Occupation: Novelist
- Writing career
- Genre: Time slip
- Website: www.barbara-erskine.co.uk:80

Barbara Erskine (born 10 August 1944) is an English novelist. She was born in Nottingham in 1944. Her father was World War II Battle of Britain flying ace Squadron Leader Nigel Rose.

Erskine has a degree in medieval Scottish history from University of Edinburgh and divides her time between Hay-on-Wye and North Essex.

Erskine is the author of a number of bestselling novels and collections of short stories dealing with both history and the supernatural. Lady of Hay, her first novel, has sold over three million copies worldwide since its first publication in 1986.

== Bibliography ==
- Lady of Hay (1986)
- Kingdom of Shadows (1988)
- Encounters (1990)
- Child of the Phoenix (1992)
- Midnight is a Lonely Place (1994)
- House of Echoes (1996)
- Distant Voices (1996)
- On the Edge of Darkness (1998)
- Whispers in the Sand (2000)
- Hiding from the Light (2002)
- Sands of Time (2003)
- Daughters of Fire (2006)
- The Warrior's Princess (2008)
- Time's Legacy (2010)
- River of Destiny (2012)
- The Darkest Hour (2014)
- Sleeper's Castle (2016)
- The Ghost Tree (2018)
- The Dream Weavers (2021)
- The Story Spinner (2024)
- The Valley of Ravens (2026)
