= Ágnes Rapai =

Hungarian poet, writer, and translator

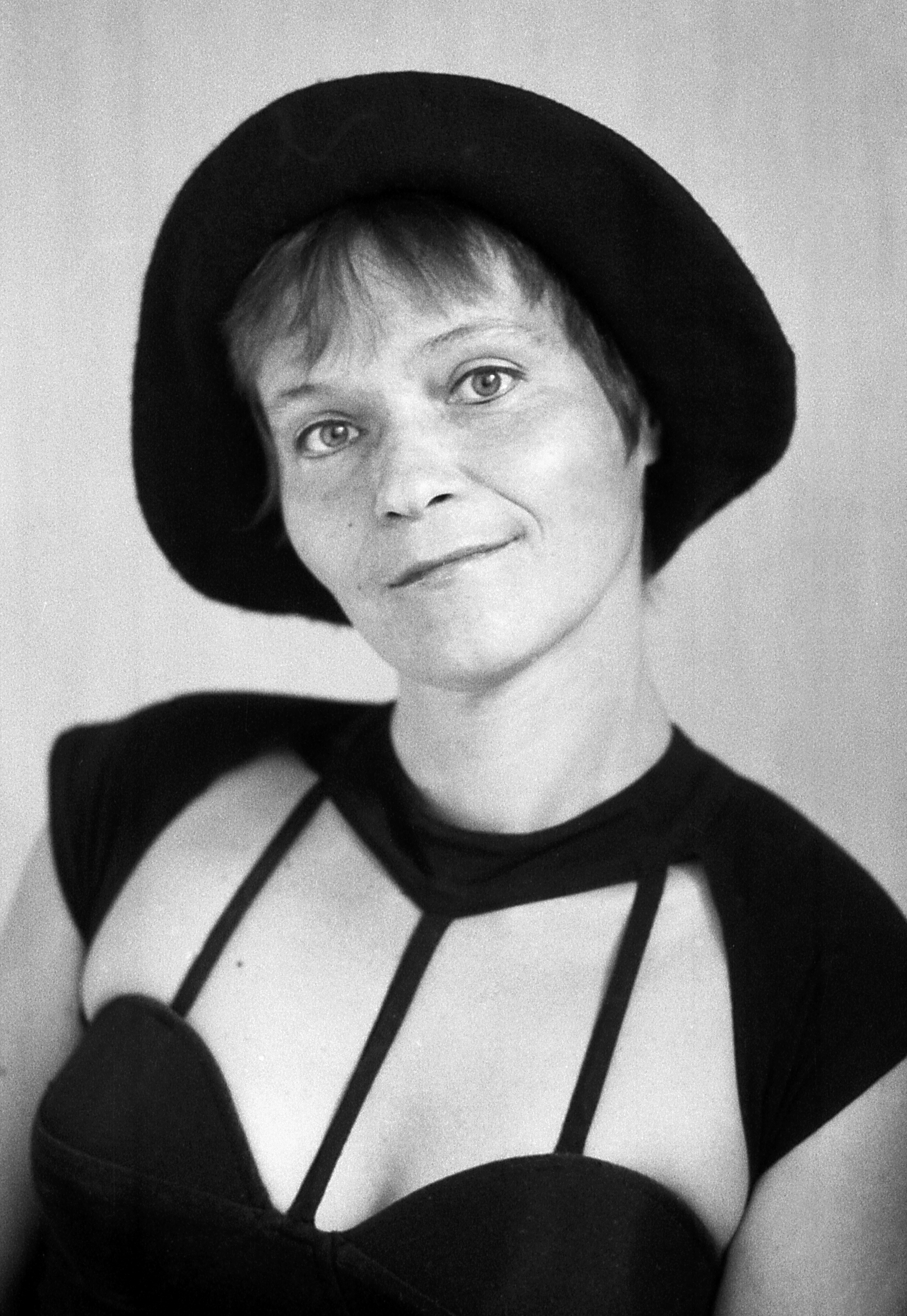
- Born: 13 March 1952 (age 74); Szekszárd, Hungary
- Education: M.V. Lomonosov Moscow State University
- Occupations: Poet; Writer; Translator
- Writing career
- Language: Hungarian
- Genre: Poetry

Ágnes Rapai (born 13 March 1952 in Szekszárd, Hungary) is a Hungarian poet, writer, and translator.

== Biography ==
Rapai spent her childhood in Budapest, Szekszárd, and Pécs. She graduated from the M.V. Lomonosov Moscow State University where she studied dramaturgy in 1975. Rapai has been a freelance poet and writer since 1989.

Since 2007, Rapai has been a board member of ARTISJUS (Hungarian Bureau for the Protection of Authors' Rights). She is also a member of the Belletrist Association (Szépírók Társasága), the Hungarian National Association of Creative Artists (MAOE), and the Hungarian PEN Club.

== Bibliography ==
Rapai has published five collections of poetry in Hungary. Her works have been published in Switzerland, including collections and anthologies such as Frauenfelder Lyriktage, Poesie Agenda, and Ungarische Poeten. All her publications in German have been translated by András Sándor.

=== Collections ===
- Máshol [Elsewhere] (in Hungarian), Magvető Kiadó, 1985
- A darázs szeme [Eye of the Wasp] (in Hungarian), Orpheusz Publishing House, 1990
- Spaziergang mit Hölderlin (in German), Orte-Verlag, 1995
- Zadarnál a tenger [The Sea by Zadar] (in Hungarian), Orpheusz Publishing House, 1997
- Budapest.. (in German), Orte-Verlag, 1999
- Arc poétika [Face of Poetry] (in Hungarian), Novella Publishing House, 2006
- Mindenhol jó [Everywhere's Good] (in Hungarian), Novella Publishing House, 2007

=== Anthologies ===
- Szép versek [Beautiful Poems] (in Hungarian), Magvető Kiadó, 2008 [1984]
- "Rodo Tykim Ulina" [We are Blood-brothers], Anthology of Finno-Ugric Writers (in Hungarian), Mari Press, Yoshkar-Ola, 1989
- Poesie Agenda (in German), Orte-Verlag, 2003 [1995]
- Hét évszázad magyar költői [Hungarian Poets of Seven Centuries] (in Hungarian), Tevan Kiadó, 1996
- Magyar költőnők antológiája [Anthology of Hungarian Women Poets] (in Hungarian), Enciklopédia Kiadó, 1997
- 4. Frauenfelder Lyriktage, Verlag Im Waldgut Frauenfeld [4. Frauenfelder Poetry days, Publishing In Waldgut Frauenfeld] (in German), 1997, ISBN 3-7294-0261-7
- Lecsukott szemeden át látom, Kortárs magyar női szerelmes líra [I can see through your closed eyes. Contemporary Hungarian Women's Poetry of Love] (in Hungarian), 2005, ISBN 963-8103-52-3
- Éjszakai állatkert [Night Zoo] (in Hungarian), Jonathan Miller Kiadó, 2005
- Mégse Légyott - Kékszakállú+Verizmó Elmaradt Randevúja [Untryst – The Cancelled Rendezvous of Bluebeard + Verismo] (in Hungarian), Miskolc, 2006
- Ötvenhat író Esztergomról [Fifty Six Writers about Esztergom] (in Hungarian), Pont Kiadó, 2006
- Légyott – B.Artók + P.Árizs Randevúja [Tryst – Rendezvous of B.Artók and P.Aris] (in Hungarian), Miskolc, 2007
- Zsuzsa Bruria Forgács (ed)., ed. (2007), Szomjas oázis. Antológia a női testről [Thirsty Oasis. An Anthology about the Female Body] (in Hungarian), Budapest: Jaffa Kiadó

== Awards ==
In 1995, Rapai received the Rosenthal Institute for Holocaust Studies Award. She was also awarded by the Hungarian Art Fund in 1996, and took the János Arany Prize in 1999.

== Activities ==
In 1997, Rapai took part in the International Poetry Festival in Frauenfeld, Switzerland. In 1999, Hungary was the guest of honor (Schwerpunkt-country) at the Frankfurt Book Fair. Her second collection of poems in German was published for this occasion.

In 2007, Rapai participated in the ninth annual Prague International Poetry Days.

== Reviews ==
Several publications have reviewed works by Rapai:

- Bella, István (1985), A fűszál színeváltozása [The Discoloration of a Blade of Grass] (in Hungarian), Élet és Irodalom
- Pécsi, Györgyi (1991), A darázs szeme [Eye of the Wasp] (in Hungarian), Életünk
- Lukácsi, András (1994), Magyar költőnő Svájcban [A Hungarian Poetess in Switzerland] (in Hungarian), Magyar Hírlap
- Sándor, András (1995), E ruhátlan lét: a költészet [Poetry – This Unclothed Existence] (in Hungarian), Tekintet
- Legeza, Ilona, "Zadarnál a tenger" [The Sea by Zadar], Ilona Legeza’s Literary website (in Hungarian)
- Kapecz, Zsuzsa (2007), Láng Olivér tündöklése és bukása [Oliver Láng High and Low] (in Hungarian), Élet és Irodalom
- Kálmán, Gábor (2007), Amikor a háziasszony verset ír [When the Housewife Writes Poetry] (in Hungarian), Könyvesblog
- Traber, Barbara (29 October 1994), Elegie am Nachmittag (in German), Badener Tagblatt
