= Into a Strange Lost World =

1952 novel by Richard Hough

- First edition (UK)
- Author: Richard Hough
- Original title: The Perilous Descent
- Illustrator: Tony Weare
- Language: English
- Publisher: The Bodley Head (UK); Thomas Y. Crowell (US)
- Publication date: 1952
- Publication place: United Kingdom
- Media type: Print
- Pages: 179

Into a Strange Lost World is a novel for children written by Richard Hough but published under the pen name Bruce Carter, which Hough used for all his books aimed at children. It was first published by The Bodley Head in 1952. It has also been published under the titles The Perilous Descent and The Perilous Descent into a Strange Lost World. It tells the story of two English airmen shot down off the Dutch coast during the Second World War. They are washed up on a sandbar where they discover an entrance to an underground world.
