= Fell Murder =

1944 novel

- First edition
- Author: E. C. R. Lorac
- Cover artist: J. Z. Atkinson
- Language: English
- Series: Chief Inspector MacDonald
- Genre: Detective
- Publisher: Collins Crime Club
- Publication date: 1944
- Publication place: United Kingdom
- Media type: Print
- Preceded by: Death Came Softly
- Followed by: Checkmate to Murder

Fell Murder is a 1944 detective novel by E. C. R. Lorac, the pen name of the British writer Edith Caroline Rivett. It was the 24th novel of her long-running series featuring Chief Inspector MacDonald of Scotland Yard. Originally published by Collins Crime Club, it was reissued in 2019 by the British Library Publishing as part of a group of crime novels from the Golden Age of Detective Fiction.

The novel takes place in rural Lancashire during the Second World War. After Robert Garth, the patriarch of the Garth family, is found dead, Scotland Yard sends MacDonald north to investigate.

== Bibliography ==
- Nichols, Victoria & Thompson, Susan. Silk Stalkings: More Women Write of Murder. Scarecrow Press, 1998.
- Reilly, John M. Twentieth Century Crime & Mystery Writers. Springer, 2015.
