= Bodley Club Library =

American subscription library service

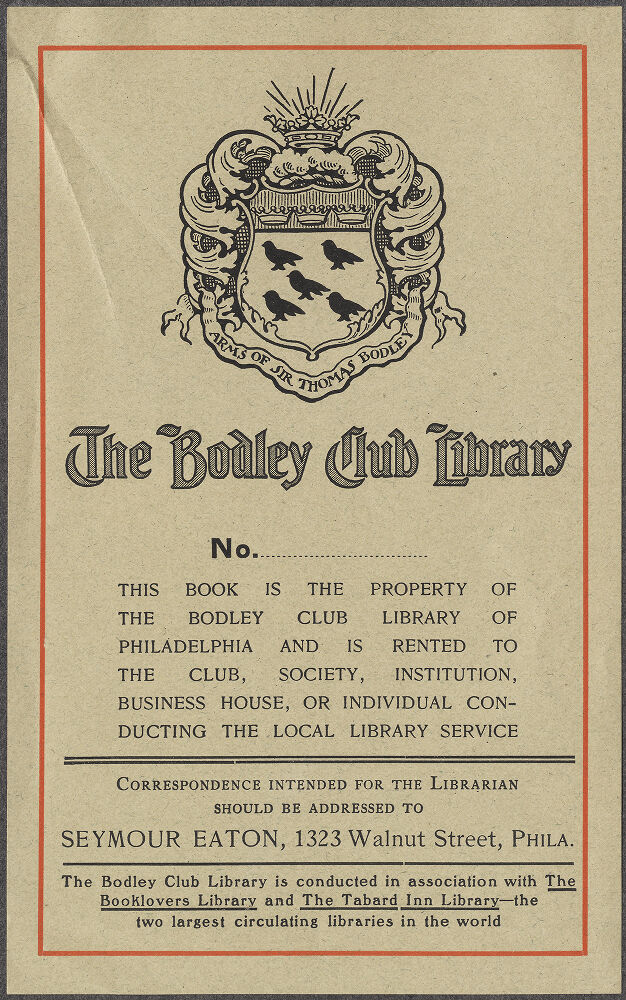
- Bodley Club Library Bookplate
- Location: Philadelphia, Pennsylvania, United States
- Type: Circulating library
- Established: 1903
- Dissolved: c.1910
- Branches: 36

Collection
- Items collected: Books, periodicals
- Size: 100,000+ volumes

Access and use
- Members: 1,000,000+ at peak

Other information
- Director: Seymour Eaton
- Parent organization: Booklovers' Library

The Bodley Club Library was a book subscription service for libraries. Operated by Booklovers' Library, its service was similar to that of The Tabard Inn Library, but unlike the Tabard Inn Library's direct-to-consumer model, the Bodley Club Library focused on serving libraries, its where books appeared in blue covers to prevent them from being turned in at Tabard Inn library stations, as public libraries tended to lend the books out free of charge. The Booklovers' Library owned both the Tabard Inn Library and the Bodley Club Library.

== Operations ==
Public libraries faced challenges in ordering large quantities of books from the Booklovers Library via the Bodley Club, as demand typically peaked for about four months in the commercial market of Tabard Inn Library. Public libraries had to wait until this demand declined before acquiring large quantities, yet public interest often persisted for several months beyond this period.

The Literature Committee at the Eau Claire Public Library faced challenges after the initial selection of books was exhausted, with new additions not arriving quickly enough each month to justify the continued cost of the service. Furthermore, the newer books were less popular, causing circulation to drop to 541 in the six months leading up to the librarian's annual report in June 1904, compared to 2,062 in the first six months after the service began. As a result, the committee decided to discontinue the service.

== Locations ==
Thirty six libraries were reported in 1904 as using the Bodley Club library, primarily in the Northeastern United States.

Bodley Club Libraries 1904
- California: Los Gatos, Santa Cruz
- Connecticut: Stamford (Ferguson Library), Norwalk, Torrington
- Delaware: Milford, Smyrna, Wilmington
- Georgia: Savannah
- Illinois: Aurora, LaSalle
- Indiana: Elwood, Muncie
- Iowa: Ottumwa, Vinton
- Kansas: Lawrence, Leavenworth, Paola
- Massachusetts: Beverly, Medford, New Bedford, Pittsfield (Berkshire Athenaeum), Walpole, Warren
- Michigan: Lansing
- Missouri: Kansas City
- New Hampshire: Portsmouth
- New Jersey: New Jersey
- New York: Amsterdam, Johnstown
- Ohio East Liverpool (Carnegie Library), Mt. Vernon, Youngstown (Reuben McMillan Library)
- Rhode Island: Pawtucket (Deborah Cook Sayles Public Library)
- Vermont: Rutland (Rutland Free Library)
- Wisconsin: Eau Claire (Eau Claire Public Library)
