= The Moffats =

Children's Novels Series

- Cover of The Moffats by Eleanor Estes, illustrated by Louis Slobodkin
- Author: Eleanor Estes
- Illustrator: Louis Slobodkin
- Language: English
- Genre: Children's novel
- Publisher: Harcourt Brace & World
- Publication date: 1941
- Publication place: United States
- Media type: Print (hardback and paperback)
- Pages: 290 pp
- Followed by: The Middle Moffat

The Moffats is the first in a series of four children's novels by American author Eleanor Estes. It tells the story of four young children and their mother who live in a small town in Connecticut. Their adventures are based on Estes' memories of her childhood and focus on a working-class, single-parent American family during World War I.

== Plot summary ==
The Moffats are a fatherless family in Cranbury, Connecticut, which Estes modeled after her hometown of West Haven. Mama is a dressmaker with four children: Sylvie, Joey, Janey and Rufus. The two youngest, ten-year-old Janey and five-year-old Rufus, are the focus of these stories. When the book opens, Janey watches as a strange man nails a For Sale sign on their house. They have lived there since shortly after her father died, and Janey cannot imagine living anywhere else. Mama tells the children not to worry about it until it sells.

Each chapter in the book tells of one simple adventure the children had. For instance, when the first day of school arrives and Rufus goes to kindergarten, he takes very seriously the instruction to watch over his young friend Hughie. When Hughie runs away from school and hides on a train, Rufus follows him, and a helpful engineer gets them back just in time for lunch. Another time, the children decide to rig up a ghost in their attic to scare the neighborhood bully Peter Frost. They use their Mama's dressmaker's form (called Madame-the-Bust), a pumpkin with real teeth and a scooter. When they take Peter Frost up to see it, they get a big scare themselves, and only later realize their cat Catherine had made the 'ghost' move.

When Rufus gets scarlet fever, the doctor puts a quarantine sign on their house. Mama, who can always find the good side of any situation, reminds the children that no one will try to buy the house while someone inside has scarlet fever. In the meantime, she entertains Rufus with stories of when she lived in New York City as a young girl. Eventually Rufus recovers and the scarlet fever quarantine sign comes down from the Moffats' house. Soon one family, the Murdocks, becomes interested in the yellow house, but they cannot make up their minds to buy it or not. The Moffats get very tired of having one or more of the Murdocks always coming by to pester the family with questions and inspections about their home. Once, Janey gets so annoyed that she pranks and scares away one of the Murdocks. Finally, the house does sell, and the Moffats move to a little house with a long front yard and a tiny backyard. The Moffats' new house turns out to have a girl Janey's age right next door. The girl, Nancy Stokes, is friendly and tells Jane Moffat that they might turn out to be best friends one day. In the end, "Estes celebrates variety as the source of pleasure and growth."

== Reception ==
The Moffats was quite well received when it appeared. A reviewer for Horn Book Magazine wrote, "this is a merry book with abundant humor in story and pictures. Some of it surely comes from the author's backward look at her own childhood." Kirkus Reviews gave it a starred review for "books of remarkable merit", saying, "the children are real and individuals, the things that happen to them -- and that they happen to -- are fun to read about." It goes on to recommend it to fans of the popular Five Little Peppers series.

Although times have changed, the book still gets good reviews. In her 1995 book Children's Books and Their Creators, children's literature expert Anita Silvey says, "Although the events are commonplace, Estes perfectly captures children's observations, logic, and speech patterns in prose notable for its immediacy and insight... The author's clear-eyed, original view of childhood shines through all of her work, particularly her classic books about the Moffat family."

== Series ==
- The Moffats, Harcourt, Brace & World, 1941, ISBN 978-0-439-61870-0);
- The Middle Moffat, Harcourt, Brace & World, 1942, ISBN 978-0-15-202529-8; 1943 Newbery Honor book

This book focuses on Janey, who decides to call herself "The Middle Moffat" to feel more special.

- Rufus M., Harcourt, Brace & World, 1943, ISBN 978-0-15-202577-9; 1944 Newbury Honor book

Rufus does everything he can to help his family deal with problems brought on by World War I.

- The Moffat Museum, Harcourt, Brace & World, 1983, ISBN 978-0-15-202553-3.

Things are changing in the Moffat family, and Janey has the clever idea of making a museum to hold special items from their lives.

NOTE: The first three novels were illustrated by Louis Slobodkin. The Moffat Museum was illustrated by Estes.

== Formats and editions ==
The Moffats is available on CD, Audiobook and cassette from Full Cast Audio; in Braille and eBook from Harcourt, Brace & World.

As of 2008, The Moffats is available in 52 editions in 5 languages.
