= Booklovers' Library =

American subscription library

Booklovers Library
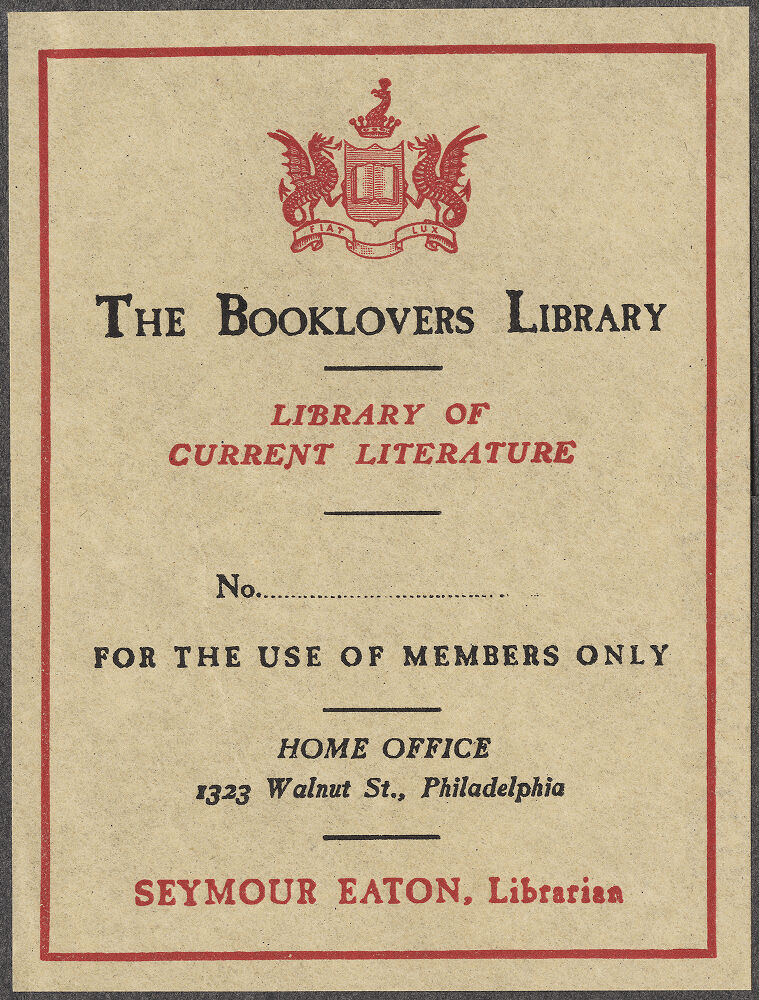
- Booklovers Library Bookplate
- Location: Philadelphia, Pennsylvania, United States
- Type: Circulating library
- Established: March 1900
- Dissolved: c.1910

Collection
- Items collected: Books, periodicals
- Size: 100,000+ volumes

Access and use
- Members: 1,000,000+ at peak

Other information
- Director: Seymour Eaton

Booklover's Library was located in Philadelphia, Pennsylvania. It published a monthly magazine, Booklovers Magazine. The Booklovers' library had an invite-only membership and was a home library service that started in 1900. The Book Lover's library acquired a large subscription list of members of the Tabard Inn Library that could be solicited for other business and home delivery of books. The Booklovers' library owned both the Tabard Inn Library and the Bodley Club Library. The Bodley Club library was specifically to service libraries, and books appeared in blue covers to prevent them from being turned in at Tabard Inn library stations, as public libraries tended to lend the books out free of charge. In one of the Booklovers Stock offers, a Rugby library for children and Temple library targeting Sunday Schools was also in the planning states in April 1903.

The Booklovers Magazine would run special offers. For $3, patrons could have an annual subscription to the magazine. For $2 more, they could get a membership to two library systems - the Booklovers Library which could be exchanged at a library center, and a complimentary Tabard Inn Library book that could be exchanged at any Tabard Inn Exchange station.

== Divisions ==
Managed by Booklovers' Library
Service	Description	Established	Sold
Booklovers Magazine	Monthly Magazine	January 1903	January 1905 (Appleton's Booklovers Magazine)
Booklovers' library	Home based library service	1900	
Tabard Inn Library	Commercial lending library exchanges	March 1902	
Bodley Club Library	Public/Private libraries and clubs	c. 1903	
Rugby Library	Specifically for children	1903 (planned)	
Temple Library	Specifically for Sunday Schools	1903 (planned)	

Allied Companies

- Philadelphia Book Store Company - creditor of each Tabard Inn Library stations' books.
- Tabard Inn Press Company - Printed the Booklovers' Magazine.
- Tabard Inn Shops and Studios
- Tabard Inn Druggist Specialty Company
- Tabard Inn Food Company

== Key figures ==
Staff
Title	Name
President	Seymour Eaton
Treasurer	John E Bryant
Manager Subscription Department	W. F. Smith
District Manager/Supervisor	William E. Roach
Business Manager	Dr. Edward MacInall
Manager	R. T. Easton
Company Attorney	E. Clinton Rhoads
Employee, Plaintiff Feb 1910	Thomas G. Happersett

== Operations ==
Establishing Stations: A District Manager would visit varying cities, shops, and advertise in papers during his stay in hopes to get enough people interested in managing the Tabard Inn Library exchange stations to setup distributing branches throughout the country.

Distribution: Books were delivered using a combination of express companies via train and wagon, along with a fleet of horse-drawn wagons owned by the Booklovers' Library. Books were delivered to the homes of members.

Excess inventory: The sales department would sell the returned books no longer used at stations on a clearance list, as they had already earned a profit.

Bookplates
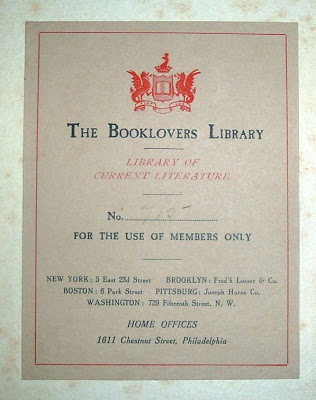
Booklovers Library bookplate

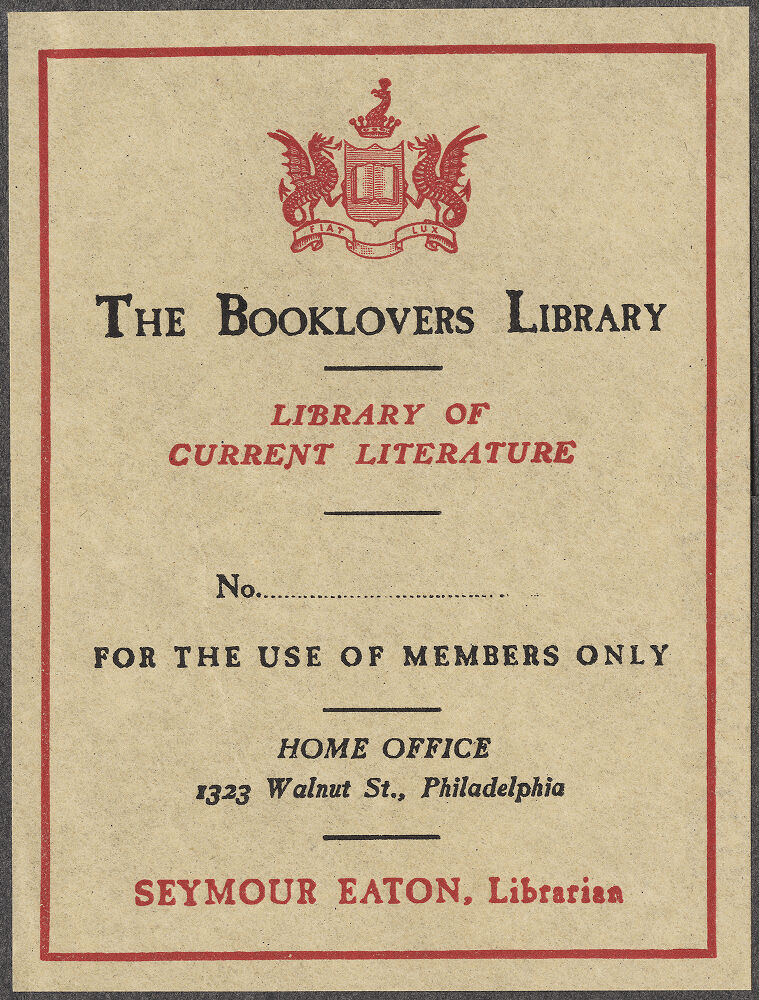
Booklovers Library bookplate

== Finances ==
The Tabard Inn Library was a corporation of its own, and reported a capital of $1,500,000 in July 1902.

In April 1903, Booklover's Corporation was capitalized for $2,600,000 with 260,000 shares. $1,900,000 had been paid already, with 70,000 shares available. 20,000 were being offered at $10 and 50,000 at $12. The company had been paying dividends at 10% per year since August 1, 1900. Dividends were paid in February and August each year.

On March 21, 1917, Barnes & Lofland auctioned a portion of the Tabard Inn Corporation's securities, which included 66 shares of preferred stock and 89 shares of common stock, both sold at a price of $10 per share. On December 19, 1917, a lot of 72 common shares was sold for $5.

== Financial history ==
=== 1905 creditors concerns ===
The company started running into financial trouble in March 27, 1905, when J. B. Lippincott & Co., the Macmillan Company, D. Appleton and Company, Curtis and Company, Evanson and Sons, and the (Midland Retail Company or Midland Metal Company) filed five separate legal concerns with the Tabard Inn Corporation sub companies.

Seymour Eaton claimed that the liabilities were less than $150,000 and the assets exceeded $2,000,000 spread throughout 2,000 cities, as well as 40 or so on trains and ocean steamships. Gross earnings for the past eight months totaled $1,014,197, averaging $125,000 per month, with cash earnings surpassing $250,000 since the beginning of the year. The president stated that for several months, the company was on the brink of either making a profit or incurring a loss. The president further explained that they took on a large business with limited capital, faced a surge of inexpensive fiction flooding the market, dealt with fears of the smallpox epidemic allegedly spreading through books, and experienced a rise in library philanthropy.

Fixing security at $125,000, John H. Sine, Charles Megargee Levis and R. Thornton Eaton were appointed as receivers of the Philadelphia Book Store Company, and the Tabard Inn Press. R. Thornton Eaton was appointed as receiver for Tabard Inn Shops and Studios, Tabard Druggists' Specialty Company, and Tabard Inn Food Company at $60,000 by Judge Holland.

==== Board decides to reorganize ====
The board of directors of the suspended corporations decided to reorganize on March 30, 1905 by issuing bonds secured by stock in some of the subordinate companies. The companies that went into receivership would be discontinued, but the library and magazines would be continued, and the discontinued companies would be solvent. The Tabard Inn would be purely literary moving forward without sales of groceries, soaps, perfumes, etc. The Old Dominion Sun mentioned in April 1905, "The Tabard Inn has discontinued everything but 'Franzied Finance'".

==== Restructured ====
On May 10, 1905, the Booklovers Corporation was incorporated in New Jersey to manage a general library and bookselling business. The corporation leased the Booklovers Library and Tabard Inn Library for a 15-year period beginning on June 1, 1905. As a result of this restructuring, the Tabard Inn Corporation, which previously held stock for both libraries, effectively ceased operations.

The Booklovers Corporation transitioned into a holding company, discontinuing its direct management of branch libraries. The library operations continued under The Tabard Inn Book Company, in which the Booklovers Corporation held $74,895 of stock out of an authorized issuance of $150,000. The corporation's board of directors included William F. Smith (President), Henry Reeves, and Ward L. Ferguson.

In the beginning of May 1905, they liquidated 50,000 books of about 250 titles.

=== 1910 false representation ===
On February 1, 1910, Seymour Eaton was under investigation in the Court of Common Pleas in Delaware County, Pennsylvania for allegedly making false representations while soliciting investments for the various corporations he controlled. The allegations also claimed that Seymour Eaton paid dividends from stock sales to entice additional investors. Before February 1903, dividends were typically declared at an annual rate of 10%. The plaintiff, Thomas G. Happersett, one of Eaton's employees, had invested $2,000 in Booklover's Library stock and $5,000 in the Library Publishing Company. Additional allegations increased the total claim to $10,000. The money came from the estate of his late wife, Frances R. Happersett. Seymour denied the charges and argued that the statute of limitations had expired.

==== No valid claim ====
On January 31, 1911, Judge Wiltbank ruled that the plaintiffs had no valid claim because their stocks had been transferred to the Tabard Inn Corporation, and there was nothing wrong with how the dividends were paid. As a result, the charges were dismissed.

=== 1911 delinquent taxes ===
On January 4, 1911, the state of New Jersey reported that Tabard Inn Library had been delinquent on taxes assessed in 1908 for the past two years.

=== 1911 balance sheet ===
By 1911, the Tabard Inn Company had assumed responsibility for operating the branch libraries previously managed by the Booklovers Corporation. A balance sheet dated February 1, 1911, listed the following financials:

Capital Stock: $150,000
Liabilities	Amount	Assets	Amount
Bills Payable	$4,554	Goodwill	$85,607
Accounts Payable	$13,017	Securities Owned	$29,240
Surplus	$11,730	Inventories	$15,629
		Booklovers Library	$41,044
		Equipment	$2,774
		Accounts Receivable	$4,760
		Cash	$247
Total	$179,301	Total	$179,301

The corporation's executive leadership included William F. Smith as President and Managing Director and Elmer E. Garrett as Secretary and Treasurer.
