= Thyra Samter Winslow =

American writer and screenwriter (b. 1886, d. 1961)

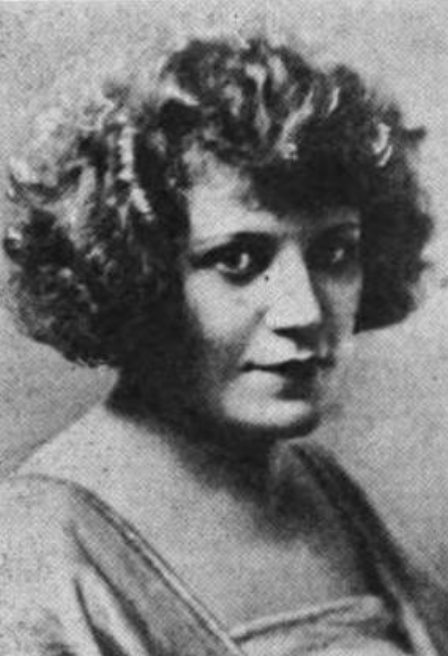
- Thyra Samter Winslow, from a 1924 publication
- Born: Thyra Samter; March 15, 1886; Fort Smith, Arkansas
- Died: December 2, 1961
- Resting place: Gate of Heaven Cemetery, Westchester County, NY
- Occupation(s): Short story writer, novelist, film story writer
- Years active: 1914–1953
- Spouse: John Seymour Winslow (1912–1927) (divorced) Nelson Waldorf Hyde (1927–1938?)

Thyra Samter Winslow (March 15, 1886 – December 2, 1961) was an American short story writer, novelist, and film story writer, who published over 200 stories during her career, frequently for magazines such as The Smart Set, The American Mercury, and The New Yorker.

== Early life ==
Thyra Samter was born to Louis Samter and Sara Harris Samter, Jewish parents, in Fort Smith, Arkansas on March 15, 1886 (though other sources list contradictory birth years). Her parents had married in May 1885, and her father ran a dry-goods store. At one point in her teen or early adult years, Samter wrote a society column for the Fort Smith Southwest American entitled "The Lady Clerk."

After graduating from high school, Samter briefly attended the University of Missouri. In 1909, she moved to Chicago, working in vaudeville theatre and as a feature writer for the Chicago Tribune. In 1912, she married writer John Seymour Winslow. They divorced some time in 1927; Thyra Samter Winslow married engineer Nelson Waldorf Hyde in December of the same year.

== Writing career ==
Winslow began publishing stories in The Smart Set in 1914. By 1923, the magazine had published almost 100 of her stories, some under the pseudonyms Bruce Reid, Laura Kent Mason, Seumas Le Chat, Betting Calvert, and others.

The first collection of Winslow's stories, Picture Frames, was published in 1923. Her only novel, Show Business, was published by Alfred A. Knopf in 1926 and reprinted with nine short stories under the title "Chorus Girl" in a 1945 collection. Doubleday published another collection of 40 of her stories, My Own, My Native Land in 1935; these stories were drawn from her writings for The New Yorker and other magazines, focusing on her home state of Arkansas.

== Hollywood ==
In 1935, Winslow went to Hollywood to work on treatments and screenplays. Her story "She Married Her Boss" was made into a film of the same name that year. According to The Hollywood Reporter, Winslow was assigned to work on the screenplay for RKO Pictures' 1936 film Night Waitress, but nothing more is known about her contributions.

Winslow also contributed to the treatment for Four Daughters (1938), adapted from Fannie Hurst's short story "Sister Act." The film was nominated for five Academy Awards, including Best Screenplay, Best Picture, and Best Director.

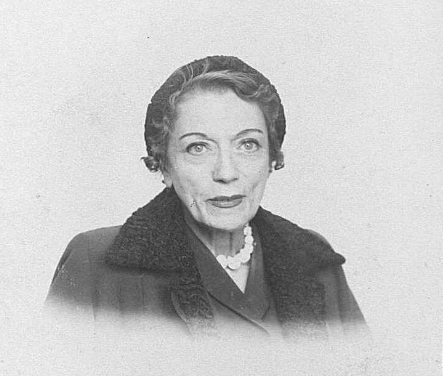
Thyra Samter Winslow in 1955

She is credited for writing a story an episode of Matinee Theatre is based upon ("Technique" 1955) as well as a script: "The Anxious Years" (1956). Lux Video Theater also based an episode on her 1935 short story "She Married Her Boss" (1956).

== Works ==
=== Novel ===
- Show Business (1926)

=== Story Collections ===
- Picture Frames (1923)
  - Reprinted as Window Panes (1945)
- People Round the Corner (1927)
- Blueberry Pie and Other Stories (1932)
- My Own, My Native Land (1935)
- Chorus Girl (1945)
- The Sex Without Sentiment (1954)

=== Novelettes ===
- Freedom in The Smart Set (Mar 1918)
- A Cycle of Manhattan in The Smart Set (Mar 1919)
- Caged in The Smart Set (Jul 1919)
- Other Good Fish in The Smart Set (Aug 1921)
- A Nice Little Couple in The Smart Set (Apr 1922)
- Blueberry Pie in The Black Mask (Aug 1922)
- The Best in The Smart Set (Dec 1922)
- The Paper Crown inLiberty (May 3, 1941)
- The Expendable Miss Frazier inShort Story Magazine (Australia) #21 1946

=== Non-Fiction ===
- Think Yourself Thin: The New Mental Outlook to Help You Lose Weight (1951)
- The Winslow Weight Watcher: A Complete Course in Nutrition for Those Who Want to Lose Weight (1953)

== Themes ==
June Sochen compares Winslow to Fannie Hurst, noting that they both wrote about the Jewish immigrant family experience in New York City as "outsiders observing a foreign and dying culture." Other favorite tropes include "chorus girls, ruined families, fitful marriages, and the ups and downs of the middle class."

== Recognition ==
Winslow made the "Roll of Honor 1918" in The Best Short Stories of 1918 and the Yearbook of the American Short Story. She was listed in the 1978 World Almanac as one of eleven famous Arkansans.

Edna Ferber called Winslow "a new master of the short story" in a blurb that appears on the cover of The Sex Without Sentiment. Carl Van Doren anthologized one of Winslow's stories in Modern American Prose in 1934. W. Somerset Maugham included her story "Orphant Annie" in his 1939 anthology Tellers of Tales. Angus Burrell and Bennett Cerf included her story, "A Cycle of Manhattan" in An Anthology of Famous Stories (New York: The Modern Library,1936).

== Death ==
Winslow suffered a fall in 1961 that left her paralyzed and hospitalized until her death on December 2, 1961.

== Sources ==
- Winslow, Thyra Samter (1924). "The Play of the Month". Motion Picture Classic.
- Blanck, Jacob Nathaniel. Bibliography of American Literature. Vol. 9 (1955–1991).
- Encyclopaedia Judaica. Jerusalem: Keter Publishing House Ltd. 15 (1971): 1584.
- Glassman, Leo M., ed. Biographical Encyclopaedia of American Jews. New York: Maurice Jacobs & Leo M. Glassman, 1935.
- Obituary. The New York Times, December 3, 1961, 88:4
- Simons, John, ed. Who’s Who in American Jewry, Volume 3, 1938–1939. New York: National News Association, Inc., 1938. 1144.
- Who’s Who in America 30: 1958–1959 (1938): 3024
- Who Was Who in America. Volume 4.
- Thyra Samter Winslow Materials, 1900–1970. Special Collections. University of Arkansas Libraries, Fayetteville, Arkansas.
- Winegard, Richard C. (1971). Thyra Samter Winslow: A Critical Assessment. Fayetteville: University of Arkansas.
