= Louis Slobodkin =

American sculptor, writer, and illustrator of children's books

- Born: February 19, 1903; Albany, New York
- Died: May 8, 1975 (aged 72); Bay Harbor Islands, Florida
- Education: Beaux-Arts Institute of Design
- Known for: sculptor, illustrator of children’s books
- Notable work: The Moffats, Many Moons
- Spouse: Florence Slobodkin nee Gershkowitz
- Awards: Caldecott Medal; 1944 Many Moons

Louis Slobodkin (February 19, 1903 – May 8, 1975) was an American sculptor, writer, and illustrator of numerous children's books.

== Life ==
Slobodkin was born on February 19, 1903, in Albany, New York. He attended the Beaux-Arts Institute of Design in New York City from 1918 to 1923. There he won more than 20 medals for his work, and was awarded the Louis Tiffany Foundation Fellowship. He also worked as an elevator operator, a dishwasher, and a factory worker.

Slobodkin married Florence Gershkowitz, a poet and children's book writer, in 1927. They had two children, Lawrence and Michael. He died of heart failure at his home in Bay Harbor Islands, Florida, on May 8, 1975.

== Career ==
Teaching himself all manner of art from an early age, Slobodkin began to sculpt art at the age of ten. During the early 1930s, he served as an assistant to Malvina Hoffman while she was creating the sculptures that would constitute the exhibition The Races of Mankind at the Field Museum of Natural History.

In 1938, his statue, "Abraham Lincoln, Rail Fence Mender," was displayed at the 1939–1940 World's Fair. When Slobodkin went to see it with his wife, the statue had been removed. Varying excuses were given as to why, including that it was too large for the space and casting shadows, and that a woman was offended by the sight of it. Fair Commissioner Edward J. Flynn eventually confirmed that the statue had been destroyed. Slobodkin waged a press campaign, which resulted in him being given a new commission to recast the statue in bronze. The new version was placed in the Headquarters Building of the Department of the Interior in Washington, DC, and a second bronze cast is in Lincoln, Nebraska, funded partially by the Sheldon Museum and partially by a community "Pennies for Lincoln" fundraising campaign.

Slobodkin did not immediately become involved with children's literature. He illustrated his first children's book in 1941, The Moffats, by his friend, Eleanor Estes, with whom he collaborated on five more books. In 1944, he won the Caldecott Medal for illustrating Many Moons, written by James Thurber. He also wrote and illustrated the popular book series The Space Ship Under the Apple Tree. He was also the author of Sculpture; Principles and Practice.

During his career, Slobodkin illustrated nearly 90 books, 50 of which he also wrote. He collaborated with his wife on five books from 1958 to 1969, including The Cowboy Twins (1960). Slobodkin's last book was Wilbur The Warrior, published in 1972.

== Selected works ==
=== Children's books ===
As author and illustrator:

- Clear the Track for Michael's Magic Train (1945)
- The Adventures of Arab (1946)
- The Seaweed Hat (1947)
- Hustle and Bustle (1948)
- Bixxy and the Secret Message (1949)
- Circus April 1 (1953)
- Mr. Petersand's Cats (1954)
- Millions and Millions and Millions (1955)
- The Amiable Giant (1955)
- One is Good, But Two Are Better (1956)
- The Little Mermaid Who Could Not Sing (1956)
- Melvin the Moose Child (1957)
- The Wide-Awake Owl (1958)
- Too Many Mittens (1958), illustrator and co-author with Florence Slobodkin
- Gogo and the French Seagull (1960)
- Io Sono (I am): Italian with Fun (1960)
- Nomi and the Lovely Animals (1960)
- A Good Place To Hide (1961)
- The Late Cuckoo (1962)
- Moon Blossom and Golden Penny (1963)
- Luigi and the Long-Nosed Soldier (1963)
- Picco the Sad Italian Pony (1964)
- The Polka-Dot Goat (1964)
- Yasu and the Strangers (1965)
- Colette and the Princess (1965)
- Read about the Busman (1967)
- Spaceship Under the Apple Tree series
  - Spaceship Under the Apple Tree (1952)
  - Spaceship Returns to the Apple Tree (1958)
  - Three-Seated Spaceship (1958)
  - Round-Trip Spaceship (1968)
  - Spaceship in the Park (1972)

=== Autobiographical ===
- Fo'castle Waltz (1945) – novel for adults, an illustrated account of Slobodkin's short career as a sailor aboard the tramp boat S.S. Hermanita.

=== Non-fiction ===
- Sculpture: Principles and Practice (1949)
- The First Book of Drawing (1958)

=== As illustrator ===
- The Moffats (1941), written by Eleanor Estes
- The Middle Moffat (1942), Eleanor Estes
- Rufus M (1943), Eleanor Estes
- Many Moons (1943), James Thurber
- The Hundred Dresses (1944), Eleanor Estes
- Young Man of the House (1946), Mabel Leigh Hunt
- The Adventures of Tom Sawyer (1946 reprint by World Publishing Co.) Mark Twain
- Jonathan and the Rainbow (1948), Jacob Blanck
- Red Head (1951), by Edward Eager
- Gertie the Horse Who Thought and Thought (1951), Margarite Glendinning
- The Alhambra (1953), Washington Irving
- Love and Knishes: An Irrepressible Guide to Jewish Cooking (1956), Sara Kasdan
- Clean Clarence (1959), Priscilla Friedrich and Otto Friedrich
- The Cowboy Twins (1960), Florence Slobodkin
- A Thousand for Sicily (1961), Geoffrey Trease
- The Beautiful Culpeppers (1963), Marion Upington
- The Shoes Fit for a King (1956), Helen Bill
