= The Middle Moffat =

1942 novel by Eleanor Estes

- First edition
- Author: Eleanor Estes
- Illustrator: Louis Slobodkin
- Series: The Moffats
- Genre: Children's Novel
- Publisher: Harcourt, Brace & World
- Publication date: 1942
- ISBN: 9780152025298
- Preceded by: The Moffats
- Followed by: Rufus M.

The Middle Moffat by Eleanor Estes is the second novel in the children's series known as The Moffats. Published in 1942, it was a Newbery Honor book. The title comes from Janey Moffat, who feels a little lost among her three siblings. Being neither the oldest or youngest, she decides to become the 'Middle Moffat' to help herself feel more important. The Moffats is set in small town Cranbury, Connecticut during World War I.

== Plot ==
Ten-year-old Jane Moffat decides that moving into a new house means a new start, and decides to create a new, more interesting, identity, so she christens herself 'the mysterious Middle Moffat'. She befriends the oldest man in Cranbury and appoints herself his secret protector to be sure he lives to be one hundred years old.

Janey is in a new school, making new friends, and much of the book deals with her establishing herself outside of the family. Wanting to uphold the honor of the Moffats, she decides she needs to win the basketball championship all by herself, while coping with stockings that continually fall down and hair she can't keep off of her mouth. She also resolves to read every book in the library, including the ones she's not very interested in, like "The Story of Lumber".

The book follows several of her adventures over the next year, each chapter presenting a different episode as Jane grows, learning about friendship and responsibility. The Middle Moffat "rejoices in the process of separation from the security of the family".

== Reception ==
Besides winning the Newbery Honor award in 1943, The Middle Moffat received positive reviews. Kirkus Reviews, in a starred review, "for books of remarkable merit", said it was funnier than the previous one. Even today, the simple story pleases. Children's Literature reviewer Betty Hicks praised Janey's personality and went on to say that "readers will relate to problems that are timeless… The charm of these stories lies in their subtle humor and abundance of heart." Comparing it and Rufus M. to the first book in the series, children's book expert Anita Silvey finds it even more perceptive, and noted the strong portrayal of World War I.

== Formats ==
The Middle Moffat is available on CD from Princeton, N.J.: Recording for the Blind & Dyslexic; Braille and eBook through Harcourt Brace and Co.
