= Tabard Inn =

Tabard Inn may refer to:

- The Tabard, Chiswick, London
- The Tabard, Southwark, London
- Tabard Inn (Washington, D.C.), one of the National Register of Historic Places listings in the upper NW Quadrant of Washington, D.C.
- The Tabard Inn Library, Philadelphia, USA - a subscription library within commercial establishments in the early 1900s
