= Secret of the Andes =

Secret of the Andes may refer to:

- Secret of the Andes (film), 1998 Argentine-American film
- Secret of the Andes (novel), 1952 novel by Ann Nolan Clark
