= The Hundred Dresses =

Book by Eleanor Estes, illustrated by Louis Slobodkin

- Cover with original design (post-1970, with "Newbery Honor" seal)
- Author: Eleanor Estes
- Illustrator: Louis Slobodkin
- Cover artist: Slobodkin
- Genre: Children's literature, realistic fiction
- Publisher: Harcourt, Brace
- Publication date: 1944
- Publication place: Australia
- Media type: Print (hardcover)
- Pages: 80
- ISBN: 978-0-15-332975-3
- OCLC: 906047056

The Hundred Dresses is a children's book by Eleanor Estes, illustrated by Louis Slobodkin, published in 1944. In the book, a Polish girl named Wanda Petronski attends a Connecticut school where the other children see her as "different" and mock her.

== Plot summary ==
The book centers on Wanda, a poor and friendless Polish-American girl. Although her grades are very good, she sits in the worst seat in the classroom and does not say anything when her schoolmates tease her. One day, after Wanda's classmates laugh at her Polish last name and the faded blue dress she wears to school every day, Wanda claims to own one hundred dresses, all lined up in her closet in her worn-down house. This outrageous and obvious lie becomes a game, and the group of girls in her class, headed by Maddie and Peggy, mock and corner her every day before school demanding that she describe all of her dresses for them. Her father, Jan Petronski, reveals that due to the constant discrimination directed at his family they must leave town.

The teacher holds a drawing contest in which the girls are to draw dresses of their own design. Wanda enters and submits one hundred beautiful designs. Her classmates are in awe of her talent and realize that these were her hundred dresses thus leading the students to believe Wanda. The students who teased her feel remorse and want her to know this, but they are not sure how. They decide to write her a kind letter and send it to her old address, hoping the post office can forward it. Unfortunately, she has already moved away and does not realize she won the contest.

Nevertheless, Wanda's lovely nature, kind heart, and forgiveness are revealed later when she tells the teacher to give the students the drawings.

== Reception ==
The Hundred Dresses was a 1945 Newbery Honor book. A 2004 study found that it was a common read-aloud book for third-graders in schools in San Diego County, California. Based on a 2007 online poll, the National Education Association listed the book as one of its "Teachers' Top 100 Books for Children."

Ewa Thompson, professor of Slavic studies at Rice University, argued in a 2020 New Oxford Review article that the book perpetuates negative stereotypes about Polish-Americans.
