= The Space Ship Under the Apple Tree =

1952 novel and series by Louis Slobodkin

Cover of the first book of series.

The Space Ship Under The Apple Tree is a children's science fiction book series by Louis Slobodkin, and also the name of the first book of the series. The books were published by Macmillan.

The series involves a Boy Scout named Eddie who meets an alien in his apple orchard who comes from the planet Martinea. The series humorously depicts their friendship as Eddie tries to explain the strange things that humans do and why.

Adele Thane adapted the first book in the series for stage performance at the Boston Children's Theatre in March 1955.

== Series ==
- The Space Ship Under the Apple Tree (1952)
- The Space Ship Returns to the Apple Tree (1958)
- The Three-Seated Space Ship (1962)
- Round Trip Space Ship (1968)
- The Space Ship in the Park (1972)

Eddie also appears as a Cub Scout in an earlier book by Slobodkin named Bixxy and the Secret Message (1949).
