= List of Tabard Inn Library locations =

American subscription library

Tabard Inn Library Stations
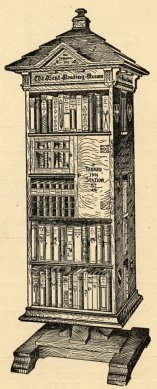
- Tabard Inn Library Exchange Station
- Branches: 1,000+ stations

On March 27, 1905, Seymour Eaton, President of the Tabard Inn Corporation, stated that the business had operations spanning from Seattle to Atlanta and from Boston to San Francisco.

This page lists the historical locations of known Tabard Inn Library exchange stations between 1902 - c.1910, revealing routes before domestic parcel post service began in 1913.

== Legend ==
The earliest known year for the establishment:

- Unknown
- Established in 1902
- Established in 1903
- Established in 1904
- Established in 1905
- Established in 1906
- Established in 1907
- Established in 1908

== District of Columbia ==
Tabard Inn Library Stations
- Washington (1510 H Street N. W.)

== Maryland ==
Tabard Inn Library Stations
- Cumberland
- Frederick
- Hancock
- Hagerstown

== New York ==
Tabard Inn Library Stations
- New York (944 Broadway)

== Pennsylvania ==
Tabard Inn Library Stations
- Bellefonte
- Bloomsburg (via Prof. Joseph H. Dennis)
- Danville (Leniger's Drug Store)
- Freeland (Grover's Drug Store)
- Mount Joy
- Philadelphia (1030 Chestnut Street)
- Punxsutawney (Banner Books Library)
- Reynoldsville (Stoke's Drug Store)
- Sayre (Gillespies Drug Store, Reeser, Kessler, Wieland Co.)
- State College (H. D. Meek, druggist)
- Stroudsburg (Wyckoff's New York Store)
- Tionesta (Davis Pharmacy)

== Virginia ==
Tabard Inn Library Stations
- Big Stone Gap (J. W. Kelly, Druggist)
- Blackstone (E. W. Sanford Co.)
- Farmville (Agnew's Drug Store, H. C. Crute & Co., Druggists)
- Fredericksburg (R. A. Kishpaugh)
- Front Royal (Trout & Turner)
- Lexington (McCrum's, Dr. Walz's Office)
- Luray (Mrs. Zerkel's art room)
- Norfolk (Dews & Maupin, Miller, Rhoads & Co.)
- Richmond, Virginia (101 East Broad Street, Slaymaker's Pharmacy, Cohen's Stationery Store)
- Roanoke (Johnson & Johnson's Drug Store)
- Staunton (Cash Cigar Store, The Banner Store)
- Warrenton (Mrs. Jessie C. Walraven)
- Williamsburg (James H. Stone, Druggist, C. J. Person)

== West Virginia ==
Tabard Inn Library Stations
- Berkeley Springs
- Clarksburg (Camden Sommers' City Book store, The County Mail Book Store)
- Fairmont (A. G. Martin Co.)
- Martinsburg (Charles O. Weaning, Druggist)
- Morgantown (Acme Book Store)
- Piedmont (F. C. JamesSon & Co.)
- Point Pleasant (Success Subscription Agency and Bookstore)
- Shepherdstown (Reinhart's Pharmacy)
- Sistersville (Opera House Drug Store)
