= Ginger Pye =

1951 book by Eleanor Estes

- First edition
- Author: Eleanor Estes
- Illustrator: Eleanor Estes
- Cover artist: Arthur Howard
- Language: English
- Genre: Children's novel
- Publisher: Harcourt Brace & World
- Publication date: 1951
- Publication place: United States
- Media type: Print (Hardback & Paperback)
- Pages: 180 pp
- ISBN: 0-590-45126-X
- OCLC: 28174884
- Followed by: Pinky Pye

Ginger Pye is a book written and illustrated by Eleanor Estes about the Pye family and the disappearance of their dog, Ginger. The book was originally published in 1951 by Harcourt, and it won the Newbery Medal for excellence in American children's literature in 1952. It was followed by a sequel, Pinky Pye, in 1958.

== Plot summary ==
Jared "Jerry" Pye wants to buy a puppy from his neighbor, Mrs. Speedy, who is selling the dog for a dollar; she tells him he must have the money soon because someone else wants to buy the puppy. After considering ways to raise the money, Jerry's friend Sam Doody stops by on a Saturday morning and asks if Jerry can dust the local church in exchange for $1. Sam pays Jerry, and Jerry, his sister Rachel, and their uncle Bennie head to the church.

After working, the three children head to Mrs. Speedy's. Leaving with the puppy, Jerry sees someone with a yellow hat running through the fields toward Mrs. Speedy's barn. While heading home, the children begin to hear footsteps behind them, but when they stop to investigate, they see no one. Jerry decides that whoever is following them is the same person he saw running through the fields and must be after the puppy. The children run home and try to spy the follower from inside their house, but all Rachel sees is a yellow hat.

Jerry visits the Speedys, but Mr. Speedy is unable to tell him about the person who also wanted to buy the puppy. Jerry's mother names the puppy Ginger. Uncle Bennie sees the yellow-hatted person again, peering through a hole in the Pye's fence; Jerry races to confront the person, but arrives too late.

On Labor Day, Jerry, Rachel, Ginger, and their friend Dick Badger head to the reservoir to swim. Rachel, not swimming because of a bee sting, hears rustling in the woods nearby, and Ginger reacts, raising his hackles; the wind blows a yellow hat into the water. Alarmed, the children decide to leave, but not before Dick marks the hat's band with red crayon.

School begins, and Ginger wonders where Jerry is going every day. With the help of the family cat, Ginger escapes the yard, intent on tracking down Jerry. Following Jerry's scent, he tracks Jerry to his elementary school. Ginger hears Jerry's voice coming from a second-story window, but he is unable to find a way in to the school, so he begins climbing up the fire escape. Ginger climbs through the window into the classroom to the astonishment of Jerry, the bemusement of the class, and the teacher's annoyance. The class settles down, and all the students return to their lessons except Wally Bullwinkle, who eyes Ginger.

On Thanksgiving, Jerry lets Ginger out into the backyard. After finishing dinner, Jerry goes to let Ginger back in, but finds him gone. Thinking Ginger had escaped again, Jerry and Rachel head out to search for him. The two children search throughout their neighborhood and town, asking passersby if they had seen Ginger. They arrive at Wally's house and knock on his door. Wally tells them he hasn't seen their dog and not to come back, as it would upset Wally's dog. Jerry and Rachel leave, with Jerry saying, “I never heard him say anything about having a dog.” Despondent, the children return home.

Desperate for clues, the Pye family visits Mrs. Speedy, who tells them the person who also wanted Ginger wore a yellow hat. With this clue, Jerry and Rachel draw a picture and present it to Chief Larrimer, who keeps the picture and sends them on their way. The local children help the Pyes search for Ginger, but interest wanes as time passes.

One winter evening, while the children are collecting firewood, Jerry hears a dog yelping; following the sound, he sees a person wearing a yellow hat, who turns out to be Wally. Wally berates them for returning to his neighborhood and storms off.

Months pass, and the family slowly gives up hope of finding Ginger, but Jerry and Rachel keep a lookout for the person in the yellow hat. In May, on Jerry's birthday, Jerry and Rachel leave to collect strawberries from a field near the train station. A train makes an unexpected stop at the station, and they see Wally board the train. Jerry asks him where he is going, and he says New York City. As the train departs, Wally's yellow hat is blown off his head. Jerry finds the red mark Dick left in the hat band.

The children hurry home, confident that Wally knows something about Ginger's disappearance. Making a detour to Wally's house, they run into Chief Larrimer, who accompanies them. The chief breaks into the house, and in the backyard, they find clues that Ginger had been kept there. Chief Larrimer promises the children that the train will be watched.

The children return home to find Ginger, fully-grown, waiting. Gramma explains that while bringing Uncle Bennie to the Pye house, they had been approached by a strange but friendly stray dog; Uncle Bennie recognized the dog as Ginger. Ginger in tow, Gramma and Uncle Bennie continued to the Pye house. Wally and his father saw Ginger while they were riding the trolley to the train station and called out, but Ginger ran and hid. The motorman wouldn't stop the tram for the Bullwinkles, so they could do nothing but watch as Gramma and Uncle Bennie returned Ginger home.

Awards
Preceded by Amos Fortune, Free Man	Newbery Medal recipient 1952	Succeeded by Secret of the Andes
