= Secret of the Andes (novel) =

1952 novel by Ann Nolan Clark

- First edition
- Author: Ann Nolan Clark
- Illustrator: Jean Charlot
- Cover artist: Jean Charlot
- Language: English
- Genre: Children's novel, Historical fiction
- Publisher: Viking Press
- Publication date: 1952
- Publication place: United States
- Media type: Print (Hardback & Paperback)
- Pages: 120
- ISBN: 0140309268

Secret of the Andes is a children's novel written by Ann Nolan Clark and illustrated by Jean Charlot. It won the 1953 Newbery Medal.

== Plot summary ==
Cusi, a modern Inca boy, leaves his home high in the Andes Mountains to learn the mysterious secret of his ancient ancestors. Accompanied by his pet llama, Misti, he slowly discovers the truth about his birth and his people's ancient glory. Now he must prove himself worthy to be entrusted with the secret from the past.

== Historical accuracy ==
Secret of the Andes is historical fiction. Some events were inspired by history: Ataulpa was held for ransom by the Spanish conquistadors. However, llamas were not a part of the ransom, and the gold was primarily ingots, not gold dust.

== Themes ==
Themes of Secret of the Andes include racial identity, preservation of historical cultures, adoption, animal guides, royal lineage, and the Spanish conquest and betrayal of the Incan Empire.

== Critical reception ==
The book is now remembered for beating out E. B. White's Charlotte's Web, which was a runner-up for the Newbery Medal in 1953. One member of the Newbery committee stated that she voted for Secret of the Andes rather than Charlotte's Web "because she hadn't seen any good books about South America." Children's literature expert Anita Silvey said in the School Library Journal: "The Secret of the Andes is a good book; Charlotte's Web, the best."

Awards
Preceded by Ginger Pye	Newbery Medal recipient 1953	Succeeded by...And Now Miguel
