= Many Moons =

1943 picture book by James Thurber

- Front cover
- Author: James Thurber
- Illustrator: Louis Slobodkin
- Cover artist: Louis Slobodkin
- Genre: Children's picture book
- Publisher: Harcourt, Brace & Company
- Publication date: 1943
- Publication place: United States
- Media type: Hardcover
- Pages: 48 pp
- ISBN: 0156569809

Many Moons is an American children's picture book written by James Thurber and illustrated by Louis Slobodkin. It was published by Harcourt, Brace & Company in 1943 and won the Caldecott Medal in 1944. The book centers around a young girl, Princess Lenore, who becomes ill, and only one thing will make her better: the Moon. The book was Thurber's first picture book.

Despite winning the Caldecott Medal with Slobodkin's original illustrations, a reprint in 1990 by Harcourt featured the text accompanied by new illustrations by Marc Simont, another Caldecott-winning artist. Current prints of the book, however, have gone back to using Slobodkin's illustrations. There was also an edition with illustrations consisting of woodcuts by Philip Reed, published in 1958. It was published by A.M. and R.W. Roe, through special arrangement with Mr. Thurber, and Harcourt, Brace & Company.

== Plot ==
Following "a surfeit of raspberry tarts", Princess Lenore falls ill and is bedridden. Her father, the king, promises he will give his daughter anything she desires most, and Lenore asks him to bring her the Moon.

The king asks the wisest men in his court how he can give his daughter the Moon, and becomes outraged when they all claim that it is too large, too far away, and composed of unstable or dangerous substances.

Despairing, the king confides in his court jester. The jester then asks the princess what she thinks the Moon is made of, how big it is, and how far away. According to the princess, the Moon is as big as her thumbnail and made of gold. She says it's so close that he could climb a tree and pluck it from the sky. Agreeing to do so, the jester takes the princess's specifications to the royal goldsmith, who creates a necklace with a Moon-like pendant. It is presented to the princess and she becomes well again.

The next day, the King fears his daughter will see the Moon in the sky and realize that the necklace is a forgery. He consults the wisest men in his court, who propose outrageous schemes to prevent her from seeing it in the sky.

Ultimately, the jester visits the princess, who is fondly gazing at the newly-risen moon. He asks her how the Moon can be in two places, and she tells him the Moon always grows back: like a child's tooth, a unicorn's horn, or flowers.

== Adaptations ==
It was made into an opera by American composer, Celius Dougherty. It was also made into a play, adapted by Charlotte Chorpenning. In 1966, an animated adaptation was produced by Gene Deitch as part of the animated film Alice of Wonderland in Paris. In 1972 an audio version was released by Caedmon Records, read by Peter Ustinov with music by Edgar Summerlin.

Awards
Preceded by The Little House	Caldecott Medal recipient 1944	Succeeded by Prayer for a Child
