= Samuel Fancourt =

Samuel Fancourt (1678–1768) was a dissenting minister and projector of circulating libraries. He is said to have been a native of Hungerford, in Berkshire, England.

== Dissenting minister ==
Fancourt wrote that one of 'the four London ministers' was his tutor, and another his predecessor at the place from which he removed to Salisbury. This probably indicates that he was trained for the ministry by Benjamin Robinson at Hungerford, and succeeded Jeremiah Smith as pastor at Andover. Robinson and Smith were two of the four ministers who led the subscribing party at the Salters' Hall conference of 1719. From 1718 to 1730 Fancourt was minister and tutor in Salisbury. On the occasion of the controversy which arose in consequence of the proceedings at the Salters' Hall conference of London ministers in February 1719, he wrote two tracts on the side of the dogmatists. Some years later he involved himself in a controversy about free will and predestination, and left Salisbury for London. While the Oxford Dictionary of National Biography states that he left because of theological controversy, an autobiographical letter claims that he only left because of financial pressure.

== The circulating library in Crane Court ==
After leaving Salisbury Fancourt went to London and there established what was said, about forty years afterwards, to have been the first circulating library. A library conducted by him, in which the subscription was a guinea per annum, was dissolved at Michaelmas 1745, and he then carried out a new plan. This plan is described in the 'Alphabetical Catalogue of Books and Pamphlets belonging to the Circulating Library in Crane Court' (Fleet Street), 2 vols. 8vo, 1748, which he issued in parts between 1746 and 1748. According to this scheme for 'The Gentlemen and Ladies' Growing and Circulating Library,’ anyone might become a proprietor by an initial payment of a guinea and a quarterly payment of a shilling. The proprietors were to choose trustees in whom the library was to be vested, Fancourt himself being appointed librarian during good behaviour. Each proprietor was to be allowed to take out one volume and one pamphlet at a time. 'He may keep them a reasonable time according to their bigness; but if they are not wanted by others he may keep them as long as he has a mind.'

The library contained two or three thousand bound volumes and about the same number of pamphlets; from a third to a half of the books and pamphlets consisted of theology and ecclesiastical history and controversy, and only about a tenth of it was 'light' literature. The house in Crane Court in which it was placed was close to the quarters of the Royal Society, and either it or the house next to it was eventually taken by that society for an enlargement of its own library. Dr. Cromwell Mortimer, second secretary to the society, was a persistent enemy of the circulating library till his death in 1752. At some period later than 1755 Fancourt left Crane Court, and, after several changes, moved his library to 'the corner of one of the streets in the Strand,’ where his various schemes finally broke down. The library was taken by his creditors, and he retired to Hoxton Square, where he was supported by some of the dissenting ministers, till he died at the age of ninety, on 8 June 1768. In the Crane Court library catalogue he offered for twelve guineas to teach 'any one of a common capacity and diligence' to read, write, and speak Latin with fluency in a year, by giving them five or six hours' tuition a week.

== Works ==
The following is a list of Fancourt's various writings, which are all, except the ninth and the last, enumerated with long titles and extracts in the Crane Court Catalogue (vol. i. pamphlets, pp. 11, 24, 27, 166–70):

- 1. 'Sermon at the Funeral of Mr. John Terry,’ 1720.
- 2. 'Essay concerning Certainty and Infallibility, or Reflections on "The Nature and Consequences of Enthusiasm",’ 1720.
- 3. 'Enthusiasm Retorted, or Remarks on Mr. Morgan's Second Letter to the Four London Ministers,’ 1722.
- 4. 'Greatness of the Divine Love,’ a sermon.
- 5. 'Greatness of the Divine Love Vindicated,’ 2nd edit. 1727.
- 6. 'Appendix to the "Greatness &c., Vindicated",’ 1729.
- 7. 'Essay concerning Liberty, Grace, and Prescience,’ 1729.
- 8. 'Apology, or Letter to a Friend setting forth the occasion, &c., of the Present Controversy' (between Fancourt, the Rev. Anthony Bliss and the Rev. John Norman), 2nd edit. 1730.
- 9. 'What will be must be, or Future contingencies no contingencies, in a Letter to the Rev. John Norman,’ Salisbury, 1730.
- 10. 'Appendix to a Letter to the Rev. Mr. Norman,’ 3rd edit. 1732.
- 11. 'Greatness of the Divine Love further Vindicated in Reply to Mr. Millar's "Principles of the Reformed Churches",’ 1732.
- 12. 'Free Agency of Accountable Creatures,’ 1733.
- 13. 'Nature and Expediency of the Gospel Revelation and of a Public Ministry,’ a sermon with appendices, 1733.
- 14. 'Union and Zeal among Protestants,’ 2nd edit. 1745.
- 15. 'Seasonable Discourse on a Slavish Fear of Man and a Holy Trust in God, suited to the Alarms and Danger of the Present Time.'
- 16. 'Nature and Advantage of a Good Education, a Sermon preached in St. Thomas's, for the benefit of the Charity School in Gravel Lane, Southwark,’ 1746.
- 17. 'The Narrative,’ London, 1747.

== Other source ==
This article incorporates text from a publication now in the public domain: "Fancourt, Samuel". Dictionary of National Biography. London: Smith, Elder & Co. 1885–1900.
