= Eleanor Estes =

American children's writer and librarian

- Born: Eleanor Ruth Rosenfeld; May 9, 1906; West Haven, Connecticut
- Died: July 15, 1988 (aged 82); Hamden, Connecticut
- Education: Pratt Institute School of Information and Library Science
- Occupations: Writer; illustrator; librarian
- Writing career
- Period: 1941–1988
- Genre: Children's literature
- Notable works: The Hundred Dresses; The Moffats series Ginger Pye; Pinky Pye
- Notable awards: Newbery Medal; 1952; Caroline Hewins Scholarship for Children's Librarians Pratt Institute Alumni Medal; 1968

Eleanor Estes (May 9, 1906 – July 15, 1988) was an American children's writer and a children's librarian. Her book Ginger Pye, for which she also created illustrations, won the Newbery Medal. Three of her books were Newbery Honor Winners, and one was awarded the Lewis Carroll Shelf Award. Estes' books were based on her life in small-town Connecticut in the early 1900s.

== Life ==
Eleanor Estes was born Eleanor Ruth Rosenfield in West Haven, Connecticut. She was the third child of father Louis Rosenfeld, a bookkeeper for a railway, and mother Caroline Gewecke Rosenfeld, a seamstress and story teller. Estes's father died when she was young and her mother's dressmaking provided for the family. Eleanor Estes attributes her love of reading, children's literature, and storytelling to her parents' fondness for books and her mother's "inexhaustible supply of songs, stories, and anecdotes, which she entertained us with while cooking dinner." In 1923, after graduating from West Haven High School, she trained at the New Haven Free Library, and became a children's librarian there.

In 1931, Estes won the Caroline M. Hewins scholarship for children's librarians, which allowed her to study at the Pratt Institute library school in New York. In 1932 she married fellow student Rice Estes. They both worked as librarians throughout New York, and he later became a professor of library science and the head of the Pratt Institute Library. Estes worked as a children's librarian in various branches of the New York Public Library, until 1941. Estes began writing when tuberculosis left her confined to her bed. Her best known fictional characters, the Moffats, live in Cranbury, Connecticut, which is Estes’ hometown of West Haven. She based the Moffats after her family, including patterning younger daughter Janey after herself, and basing Rufus on her brother, Teddy.

The Esteses had one child, Helena, born in Los Angeles in 1948, where Rice Estes was assistant librarian at the University of Southern California. In 1952 they moved back east and worked as librarians. Estes also taught at the University of New Hampshire Writer's Conference.

Eleanor Estes died July 15, 1988, in Hamden, Connecticut. Her papers are held at the University of Southern Mississippi, University of Minnesota, and the University of Connecticut. She wrote 20 books.

== The Hundred Dresses ==
Estes’s book The Hundred Dresses was a Newbery Honor Book in 1945. It spoke about the bullying of children based on their races and their nationalities. The book is about a young Polish girl named Wanda Petronski who is bullied by her classmates for her unusual Polish name and the blue dress she wears every day. Wanda claims to have a hundred dresses at home and her classmates don’t believe her. After being pulled out of school by her father, Wanda wins a school art contest for her one hundred drawings of dresses. Her classmates felt regret about bullying her when they realized that it was their own faces drawn in the design of dresses by Wanda. Estes based the book on an incident from her own childhood, to atone for staying silent when a peer was bullied.

== Awards ==
- Newbery Medal, 1952 – Ginger Pye
- Newbery Honor Books – The Middle Moffat, Rufus M., The Hundred Dresses
- Lewis Carroll Shelf Award, 1961 – The Moffats
- Certificate of Award for Outstanding Contribution to Children’s Literature, 1968
- Pratt Institute Alumni Medal, 1968
- Laura Ingalls Wilder Award Nominee, 1970

== Reception ==
According to reviewer Carolyn Shute, Estes had the "ability to distill the very essence of childhood." Anita Silvey said she possessed a "rare gift for depicting everyday experiences from the fresh perspective of childhood." Estes is primarily recognized as a writer of family stories, and as one who "shaped and broadened that subgenre's tradition", primarily through her "seemingly artless style". Eleanor Cameron, in an article for The Horn Book Magazine, included Estes' Moffat books among "those that sit securely as classics in the realm of memorable literature".

== Works ==
- The Moffats (1941) – Awarded the Lewis Carroll Shelf Award
- The Middle Moffat (1942) – Newbery Honor
- The Sun and the Wind and Mr. Todd (1943)
- Rufus M. (1943) – Newbery Honor
- The Hundred Dresses (1944) – Newbery Honor
- The Echoing Green (1947)
- Sleeping Giant and Other Stories (1948)
- Ginger Pye (1951) – Winner of the Newbery Medal
- A Little Oven (1955)
- Pinky Pye (1958)
- The Witch Family (1960)
- Small but Wiry (1963)
- The Alley (1964)
- The Lollipop Princess (1967)
- Miranda the Great (1967)
- The Tunnel of Hugsy Goode (1972)
- The Coat-Hanger Christmas Tree (1973)
- The Lost Umbrella of Kim Chu (1978)
- The Moffat Museum (1983)
- The Curious Adventures of Jimmy McGee (1987)
