= Rice Estes =

American librarian

- Born: April 27, 1907
- Died: March 17, 1996 (aged 88)
- Occupation: librarian

Rice Smith Estes (1907 - 1996) was an American librarian known for his activism against segregated public libraries in the United States.

== Early life and education ==
Estes was born and raised in South Carolina. His parents were Elliott Estes Jr. and Sadie Jane Calhoun. He graduated from the University of South Carolina and got a master's degree in English literature from the University of Southern California and a master's degree in library science from the Pratt Institute. At the Pratt Institute he met and married Eleanor Estes (née Rosenfield) in 1932. They had one child, Helena, born in 1948, who became a librarian.

== Career ==
After college, Estes got a job at Brooklyn College where he worked as a librarian while his wife wrote children's books, and he also taught library science at the Pratt Institute. In 1948 they moved to Los Angeles and Estes worked as assistant librarian at the University of Southern California. They moved back to New York in the 1950s. Estes got a position as head librarian at Fairfield Memorial Library in Connecticut in 1952 and worked there until becoming associate director of George Washington University Library in 1953.

Estes later became the Head Librarian and Acting Dean of the Pratt Institute in 1955 until he retired from there in 1972. Estes and his wife later moved to New Haven where Estes became an associate librarian at Albertus Magnus College.

== Library activism ==
In 1960, Eric Moon published Estes's article "Segregated Libraries" in Library Journal which started a debate about library associations' inaction regarding segregated public libraries in southern states in the United States. Rice wrote that the American Library Association "has been completely ineffective about the issue. It has never even passed a resolution on the subject. It has never commended the efforts of Negro readers and organizations who have tried to end library segregation by doing everything from making a mild request to staging library sit-ins. It has not attempted to bring a law suit or lent its name as amicus curiae to any group bringing a suit."

Rice and Moon together suggested remedies ALA could support, including advocating for withholding federal Library Services Act funds from libraries whose services were not available to all people. According to a biography of Moon, "That article would put the issue of race front and center of the national library agenda, where it would remain until the stain of official segregation had been removed."
