= Distributed library =

An example of a private library where the user could lend books from to others.

A distributed library is a collection of materials available for borrowing by members of a group, yet not maintained or owned by a single entity. The library catalog is maintained on a database that is made accessible to users through the Internet. This style of library is still in its infancy. Administrative software continues to be developed and distributed.

An early example of this style of library (if not the first of its type) is the Distributed Library Project of the San Francisco Bay Area. While distributed libraries are being established in several cities worldwide, the San Francisco Bay Area library still only has a few hundred members.

Another example, which takes a slightly different approach, is the Unlibrary. In this system, users are free to create communities of any size and scope, rather than a single citywide community. For instance a church might have its own community, with church members all able to borrow from each other. Users can also have private, invite-only groups.

Another example is the digibruted library of Geneva. The name digibruted is coined from “Digital” and “Distributed”. This library is a digital construction that indexes books for local distribution. The difference from Unlibrary is that the books are freely given to readers, who act also as librarians, in a kind of peer-to-peer schema.

== Early Concepts ==
A precursor is the Tabard Inn Library established in 1902 where travelers could check out books at one station and return them at another, with each station operated by a different individual. To patrons, the library appeared as a distributed library. The Book Lovers Library based in Philadelphia, PA rented the books to each exchange station.

== See also ==
- BookCrossing
