= Rufus M. =

1943 novel by Eleanor Estes

- Rufus M.
- Author: Eleanor Estes
- Illustrator: Louis Slobodkin
- Series: The Moffats
- Genre: Children's Novel
- Publisher: Harcourt, Brace & World
- Publication date: 1943
- ISBN: 9780152025779
- Preceded by: The Middle Moffat
- Followed by: The Moffat Museum

Rufus M. by Eleanor Estes is the third novel in the children's series known as The Moffats. Published in 1943, it was a Newbery Honor book. The title character is the youngest of four children growing up in a small town in Connecticut in 1918.

== Plot ==
Each chapter in this book tells another story about Rufus and his family. Rufus has a great imagination. He uses it to create interesting friends for himself. For example, a flying horse named Jimmy and an invisible piano player who lives in the Saybolts. He decides to create a best friend, Cardboard Boy, who is also Rufus's enemy. He and his friend even ride around town on a bicycle.

Rufus is also quite persistent. He wants a library card, even though he can't read yet, so he works hard to learn to write his name. Things are tight for his family; it's not easy for Rufus' mother to earn enough to feed four children. So Rufus plants some special "Rufus beans". Unfortunately he can't resist digging them up every day to see if they are growing.

World War I is in its final year, and Rufus M. shows its effect on the family, with shortages of some food and coal. Rufus also writes to a soldier, at one point asking for a pony from France. The books ends with the family celebrating Armistice Day writing their dreams for the future on paper and burning them at the stove.

== Reception ==
Besides winning the Newbery Honor award in 1944, Rufus M. was well received by major reviewers. The New York Times called the Moffats "practically an institution . . As nice a group as ever pulled together through hard times." Set during World War I, this book touches upon the effects of the war on those left behind. Published during World War II, Saturday Review remarked on the parallel, saying readers experiencing the war in England would enjoy reading about Americans living though tough times. Kirkus Reviews gave Rufus M. a starred review for "books of remarkable merit"

Rufus M. continues to receive positive reviews. Carol Hurst noted in Teaching K-8 Magazine that the Moffats portray a poor family that cares for each other, and children and adults will identify with Rufus' sense of fun.
