= Tabard Inn Library =

American subscription library

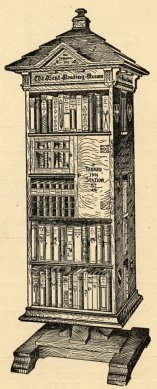
- Tabard Inn Library Exchange Station
- Location: Philadelphia, Pennsylvania, United States
- Type: Circulating library
- Established: March 1902
- Dissolved: c.1910
- Branches: 2,040+ stations

Collection
- Items collected: Books, periodicals
- Size: 100,000+ volumes

Access and use
- Members: 1,000,000+ at peak

Other information
- Director: Seymour Eaton
- Parent organization: Booklovers' Library
- Motto: "The best reading rooms in the world are the homes of the people"

The Tabard Inn Library was a circulating subscription library with numerous exchange stations (also known as sub-stations) across the United States. It was founded in March 1902 by Seymour Eaton. The library operated as a commercial lending service, using distinctive revolving bookcases placed in various shops, each holding between 125 and 250 books. Borrowing required both a membership and an exchange ticket, which could be purchased from agents managing the exchange stations. The books were often referred to as "nickel books" due to the common exchange fee of five cents.

The Tabard Inn Library could be classified as a hidden library, as stations were located in stores, offices, and private homes. Membership provided access to all stations within the distributed network of libraries, with members taking ownership of borrowed books for any duration. Travelers could return and exchange books at any station. Memberships were transferrable, making the service popular for holiday gifts.

The Tabard Inn Library was an outgrowth of the Booklovers' Library but under the same management in Philadelphia, Pennsylvania. The libraries later became available in Canada operating out of Montreal in 1906.

== Differences ==
=== Private libraries ===
Unlike libraries at the time that required private membership, the Tabard Inn Library operated similarly to the public subscription libraries headed by Boots and W. H. Smiths.

=== Circulating libraries ===
The shelves were regularly stocked with the latest publications, setting it apart from other circulating libraries of its day.

=== Bookslovers library ===
The Tabard Inn Library and the Booklovers Library differed primarily in their membership structures and borrowing methods. The Booklovers Library operated with a limited membership, charging annual fees ranging from $5 to $25, and allowed members to request specific books for home delivery. In contrast, the Tabard Inn Library offered unlimited membership for a one-time fee that was significantly lower than the Booklovers Library's rates. Rather than providing home delivery, the Tabard Inn Library functioned as a self-service system, resembling a modern-day Little Free Library. Members could return books at any station by placing them on a designated shelf, select another book from the collection, and deposit an exchange ticket into a slot within the bookcase. Both libraries offered access to the latest publications of their time.

== Bibliostats ==
At its peak, the Tabard Inn Library claimed to have thousands of exchange stations across the United States. By 1905, the library's president reported locations in over 2,000 cities, with additional stations available on at least 40 trains and steamships. Initially launched as the Tabard Inn Club Service, the collection offered 125 books, with an exchange fee of 25 cents.

Promoted as "The Largest Circulating Library in the World," the library's advertisements boasted over one million books in circulation. In early May 1905, the company liquidated 50,000 used books from a selection of approximately 250 titles.

=== Locations ===
==== Historic ====
On March 27, 1905, Seymour Eaton, President of the Tabard Inn Corporation, stated that the business had operations spanning from Seattle to Atlanta and from Boston to San Francisco.

See List of Tabard Inn Library locations

==== Today ====
Library of Congress (Washington, DC): The collection is part of the larger Jacob Blanck Collection. It includes an assortment of books, and various related volumes and catalogs. It does not include an exchange station. The collection is located in the Thomas Jefferson Building, on the second floor within the Rare Book and Special Collections Reading Room (LJ-239). It can be accessed using the call number Z664.T33 T33 1900 (Tabard Inn Library Collection).

Elisha D. Smith Public Library (Menasha, Wisconsin): On display in the main atrium of the library. Patrons can check out books on display. Materials on shelves are old, but not original to Tabard Inn. The exchange station had been lent out previously to Menasha Historical Society for a centennial event in February 2023. The library had displayed various printed ephemera and artifacts of the 20th century lending library in 2010.

Oceanside Public Library (Oceanside, CA): A Tabard Inn bookcase was restored by the El Camino Real Questers. It was donated to Oceanside Public Library in 2010. Over the next four years, the California Questers took on the task to locate 36 original books to place on the shelves.

== Operation ==
=== Philadelphia ===
Serving as the central hub of the Tabard Inn Library, the Philadelphia headquarters coordinated the establishment of exchange stations, book distribution, and inventory management across the country.

==== Establishing stations ====
The company placed advertisements in newspapers seeking individuals to canvass and represent the library, offering up to $50 per week. District Managers traveled to various cities, visiting shops and advertising locally to recruit station managers and establish distribution branches. The library targeted cities with populations of 2,000 or more, with a particular focus on partnering with drugstore owners.

==== Distribution ====
Books were shipped from Philadelphia using express companies that transported them by train and wagon. A fleet of horse-drawn wagons operated by the affiliated Booklovers' Library facilitated deliveries directly to members’ homes.

==== Excess inventory ====
Returned books that were no longer needed at stations were sold by the sales department through clearance lists, as they had already generated a profit during their circulation.

=== Exchange stations ===
==== Establishment ====
Storekeepers who acted as local representatives collected membership payments from subscribers, which were held in a bank until the minimum threshold of fifty—or in some cases, seventy-five—subscribers was met. Once this requirement was fulfilled, the first shipment of books was delivered to the store.

In the early years of the service, storekeepers could purchase the library exchange station for $100, along with a fixed annual fee for Tabard Inn Library services. Books were available for purchase at $1 each in lots of 25, 50, or 100, selected from a catalog of approximately 2,000 titles. Each station could house up to 250 books, with collections rotated weekly in larger cities or once or twice a month in smaller locations. The social columns in local newspapers often announced the arrival of new books. Specialized catalogs were available, including one dedicated to French foreign literature, featuring titles numbered 7001 through 7093.

==== Operation ====
Upon delivery, all books arrived pre-labeled and ready for circulation. Members could return and exchange any number of books each month, with transportation costs included in the rental fee. This system ensured that each station maintained a fresh selection of titles. At the conclusion of the service period, all books were returned to the company.

==== Discontinue ====
If a storekeeper chose to discontinue the Tabard Inn Library service, they were required to return all books and book checks, except those issued to individual members, or compensate the company for any unreturned items. Each member was permitted to retain either one book or one book check as part of the service's termination policy.

=== Members ===
Obtaining membership was open to the public. Anyone could purchase a book or book check/ticket at an exchange station, or through mail. Some member agreements required a set number of exchanges each month. The system was set up to allow both annual and lifetime membership. An annual membership was $1.50, but a life membership at $5 allowed an unlimited number of exchange tickets at 5 cents each. Exchange tickets were available in packages of six for 25 cents or 25 for one dollar. In December 1903, all memberships were treated as lifetime memberships at $1.50 and exchange tickets for extra books were no longer valid.

Renewing membership fees were dropped by some vendors, and treated patrons as if they had a lifetime membership.

Transferring Membership was as simple as handing a book to someone else. However, there was also a transfer fee of twenty cents.

Checking out a book was done either through the purchase of book (new membership), exchanging a book, or turning in a book check/ticket (reactivating membership). The book came in a cloth case to both protect the book and distinguish it from other books. The exchange operated as a self-service system, allowing members to rotate the bookcase to access a compartment on one side and deposit the five-cent exchange fee.

Returning a book could be done without any identification other than possession of a Tabard Inn Library Book, at any Tabard Inn Library station regardless where the book originated from. The agent would charge an exchange fee and any overdue fines if they opted to impose them. Members would pay 5 cents for every week that they had kept the book. Afterwards, the member could choose a new book. Books could be exchanged more than once a day.

Discontinuing membership: Members could temporarily discontinue membership by asking for an Out of Service ticket when returning a book after settling the exchange fee and any overdue fines. They would no longer be required to exchange books throughout the month until they reactivated their membership.

Reactivating membership Book checks could be provided in exchange for a book, without any fee.

Lost Books were handled by purchasing a new membership (book).

Fines & Fees varied, and were often left up to each agent of an exchange station to set.

Requesting Books: Members could look through book catalogs provided by the individual managing the station, to have the books ordered with the next delivery.

=== Pricing ===
Pricing was for the most part left up to the operators of each Tabard Inn Library exchange station. However, the pricing model changed over time to impose overdue fees as members visited the stations less often, affecting the libraries ability to sustain itself.

Pricing for Book Exchange Station Services
Service	Description	Common Price	Price Range
Annual Membership	Cost to purchase book or check/ticket	$1.50	$1 – $5
Lifetime Membership	No annual fee, checkout multiple books	$1.50	$0.69 – $5
Transfer Membership	Transfer to another family member or friend	$0.20	
Book Exchange	Cost to exchange one book for another	$0.05	$0.05 – $0.10
Book Renewal	Cost to extend time to checked out book	See book exchange	
Late returns	Charges for returning books past a week	$0.05 per week	$0.01 – $0.02 per day $0.05 – $0.10 per week
Inconsistent usage fees	Changes for failing to exchange books below a set threshold in a month	Equivalent in Exchange fees	
Temporary Suspension	Cost for a book check to pause membership.	none	
Lost Book	Cost for a lost book.	New membership	

== Appearance ==
Its namesake and appearance was based on The Tabard, an inn located in Southwark, South London, known for its reference in The Canterbury Tales and illustrated on some of its bookplates.

=== Exchange stations ===
It generally gives the appearance that it has a high quality book selection. For its time, its appearance was described as old-fashioned by the manufacturer. Its unique appearance (Tabard Inn design) was a tall wooden revolving bookcase with a square shake roof as a hip roof including two link dormers. Some were made from mahogany or quartered oak. It could hold 75, 125, 250, and 500 books. It had a message at the top, just under the roof, wrapped around each side with the text: "The Best Reading Rooms In the United States Are the Homes of the American People". The earlier motto had a more worldly claim as "The Best Reading Rooms In the World Are The Homes of the People." The rotating display stand, or spinner rack, could be turned by hand to see books available on each side. The area below the roof has oak moulding with a Queen Anne profile. Shields and subjects are engraved on two opposite sides including Fiction, Politics, Mechanics, biography, poetry, Religion, History and the front door has a brass slot, and says "The Tabard Inn Library – Exchange Station". A door with a window also appears next to it. A plaque on one side is engraved with the motto "With all the Red Tape on the Box" in shaky arts & crafts lettering.

=== Books ===
The books were kept on the shelves in black cloth boxes with a strip of red tape around the bottom of each side, and a four digit number below the tape facing onlookers. Advertisements often had the company's motto: "With all the Red tape on the BOX." Books had a bookplate inside the front cover, often listing the book number that matched the numbered box to which it belonged. Advertisements would claim "No red tape, except the little band of it on the black cloth cases holding the books."

== Promotions ==
At its launch, Seymour Eaton sought to build a large membership base by offering 40 cash prizes totaling $2,500, with a maximum award of $1,000 per person, for lists of names and addresses of individuals interested in books and literature from towns and cities east of the Mississippi.

Members who enrolled on the first day of the libraries' opening in March 1902 were eligible to receive a complimentary literary magazine subscription for one year. On opening day, members who secured two or more subscribers, up to a maximum of six, were eligible to receive a monthly royalty payment on the tenth of each month for twelve months, ranging from $5 to $500.

Oftentimes, a news paper would attempt to increase its subscriber base by offering a subscription to a local Tabard Inn Library, sometimes listing the available four-digit call numbers, title, and author to be delivered once they signed up.

New members would have exchange fees waived for two months.

The lifetime membership was offered for 75 cents in November 1907. Another location offered lifetime memberships at 69 cents in May 1910.

As part of a promotional campaign, Harold L. Gillespie, a prescription druggist in Sayre, Pennsylvania, offered new Tabard Inn Library members a second book free of charge when beginning a subscription, valid for a 10-day period.

== Precursor to public libraries ==
Many libraries today, when digging onto the history of their communities, will often find that their little town or city had a Tabard Inn Library prior to the establishment of a public library.

In Front Royal, Virginia, a Tabard Inn library had been setup in 1903 by Mrs. B. M. Cone with the initial plan of $1.50 for membership with exchange tickets (aka book checks) for 5 cents each, or six for 25 cents when a Library was not present in the rural mountain town. The town would receive 130 to 150 books each month, replacing books that were read. Trout & Turner, a druggist on Main Street, often advertised membership for $1.35.

In Marion County, Indiana membership was advertised at $5 for over 100,000 volumes. The Indianapolis Times newspaper purchased memberships and provided them to anyone subscribing to the paper for a year – so long as they paid a 50-cent registration fee once they received their membership certificate in 1903. They advertised access to 34 substations in the area.

== Benefits ==
In an area were many large private libraries may be within the area, a Tabard Inn Library filled in the need where a public library was not available.

The ability to exchange books alleviated the need to care for books after a book was read.

No overdue fines: Some stations advertised that you could keep a book as long as you want without fines.

Latest books: Popular books could be read within a month of being published. Public libraries had the opportunity to review newly published books firsthand rather than relying solely on book reviews for ordering decisions, as any unwanted book could be returned the following week. Tasks such as accessioning, cataloging, classifying, labeling, stamping, and pocketing were already handled. Maintenance costs, including rebinding or replacing damaged books, were also covered by the Booklovers Library, further reducing cost in library operations.

Any number replaced: Some Tabard Inn Libraries would choose to have half of their books replaced at once.

Transferrable memberships allowed books to be gifted.

Public libraries added the service to their existing collections to maintain a section of current books and multiple copies of recent titles for short-term use, helping to reduce costs associated with weeding when demand decreased.

Local librarians observed that the introduction of a Tabard Inn Library helped alleviate the demand for popular fiction titles. As many libraries possessed only a single copy of popular books and often faced long wait times to acquire additional copies, the Tabard Inn Library provided an alternative source for readers, reducing pressure on library collections.

== Criticisms ==
Worn Books: When ordering books, used books were often sent rather than new ones, which was an issue for actual libraries using the system concerned with quality.

There was a preference for traveling libraries as they started becoming popular, especially those offered from the state without costs.

Members sometimes took more books than they were entitled to.

The service faced criticism for its membership fees and ongoing usage costs, especially when compared to free public libraries that offered services at no charge to patrons. As the Tabard Inn Library approached the end of its heyday, some stores began replacing it with alternative services like the Readers' Club Library, which offered lower costs while accepting Tabard Inn books in exchange for a membership.

=== Hardships ===
In 1905, Seymour Eaton explained that the company encountered a surge of inexpensive fiction flooding the market, concerns that the smallpox epidemic was potentially spreading through books, and an increase in library philanthropy.

=== Unprofitable ===
The return on investment did not justify the effort to manage stations. C. J. Person stated that they paid $5 per month, but only brought in $2.50, and reminded subscribers that they were required to make at least two exchanges each month. Stations needed to sign up with at least 50 members to start the service, and would need at least two exchanges per month from all members to break even. Members caught on that they could exchange books among each other to bypass the five-cent exchange fee at Tabard Inn Library stations, making it unviable for the stations to be self sufficient. On November 10, 1908, The Banner Store started to require members to exchange books once a week, or have a one cent fine imposed per day past a week. "Out of service" checks were issued for anyone who wanted to return books without exchanging them to avoid fines. As stations shut down before completing their first year, it was believed that allowing annual members to keep the books in their possession was sufficient compensation. One druggist discontinued the service and sold the remaining books at 10 cents each.

== Galleries ==
=== Library exchange station ===
The exchange station was illustrated in many newspaper ads across the country for both shop-keepers and potential members, often describing how the library system worked.

Ads & Illustrations
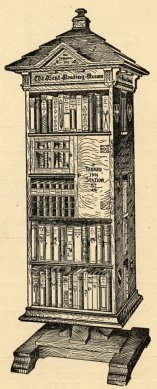
Bookcase Illustration

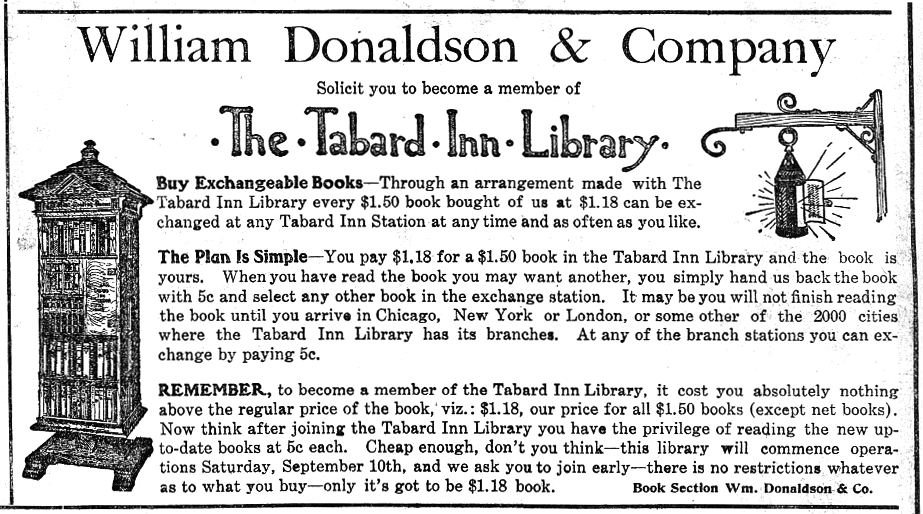
Ad for patrons

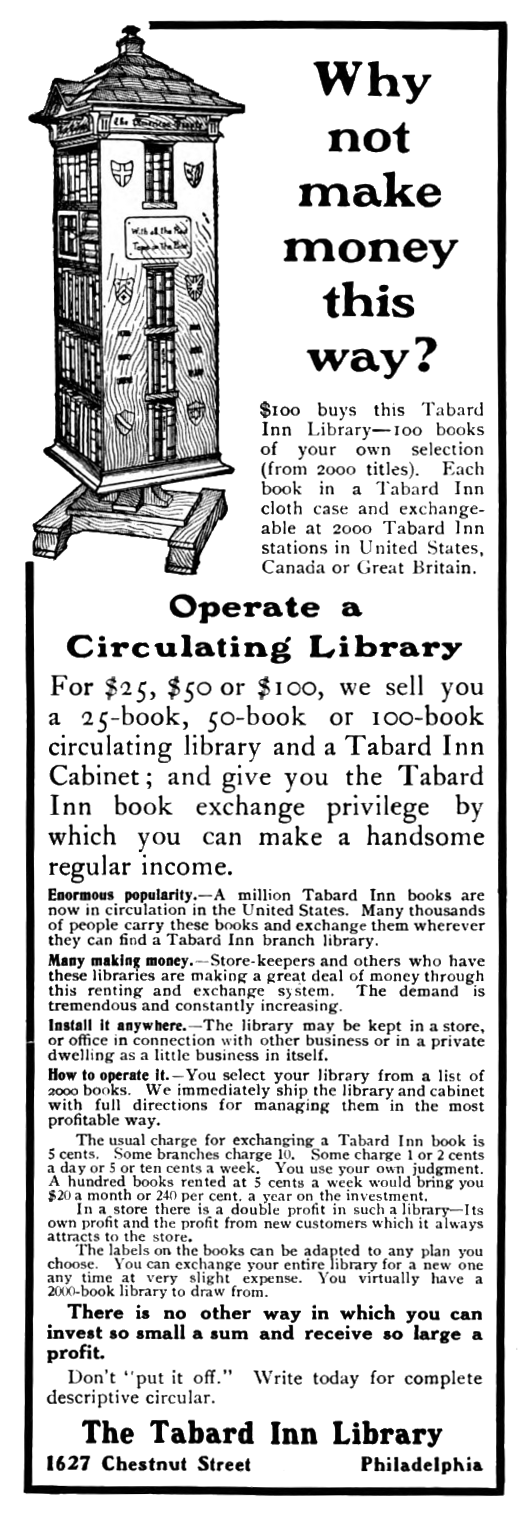
Ad for store keepers

=== Bookplates ===
Bookplates were found inside the front endpaper displaying the address of the home offices in Philadelphia, Pennsylvania on Chester or Walnut Street. Some displayed a four digit call number matching the books box number. Others displayed information in how the library system operated, Seymour Eaton as the librarian, or an illustration of The Tabard.

Bookplates
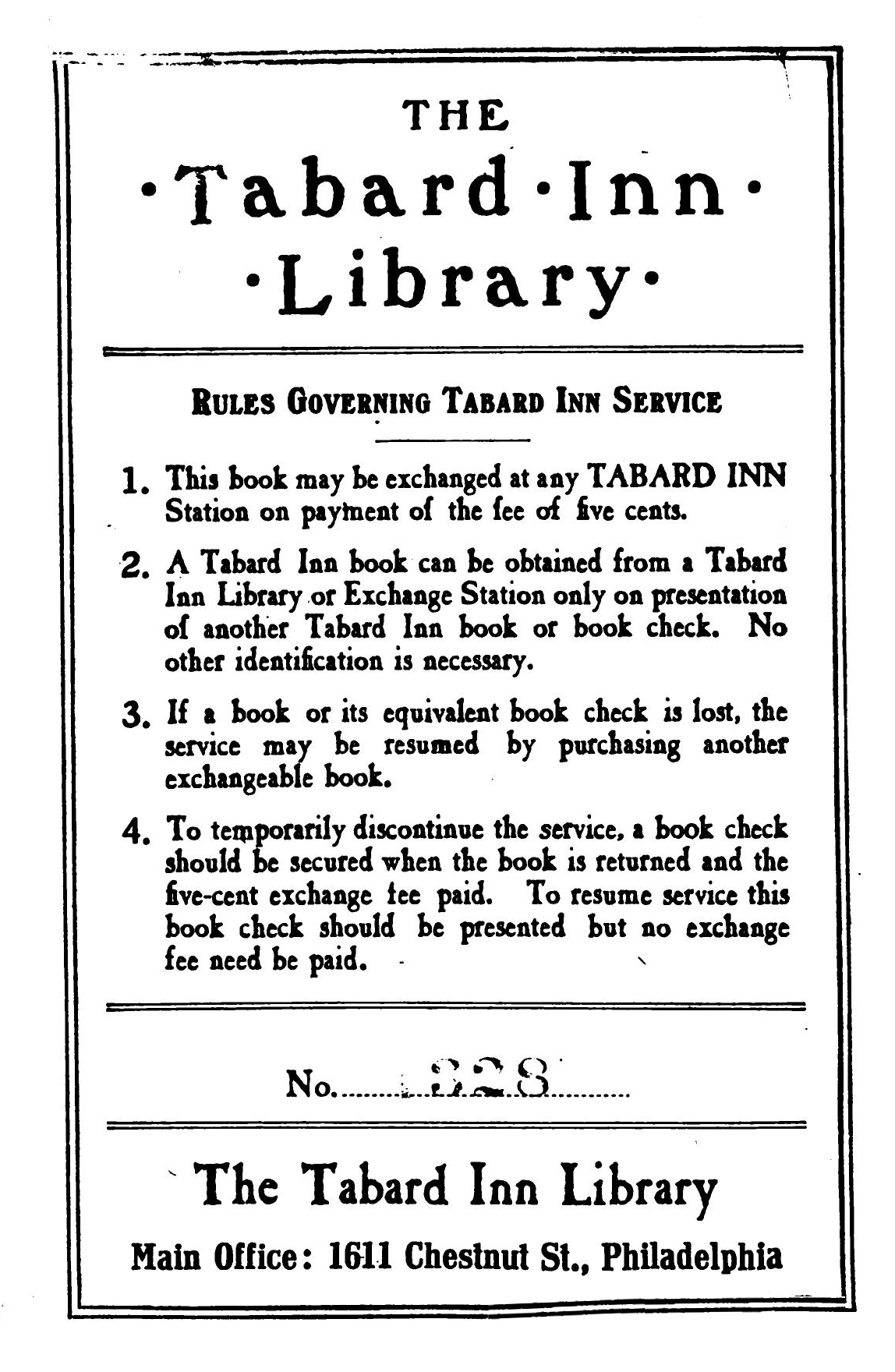
Bookplate No. 1328 with rules

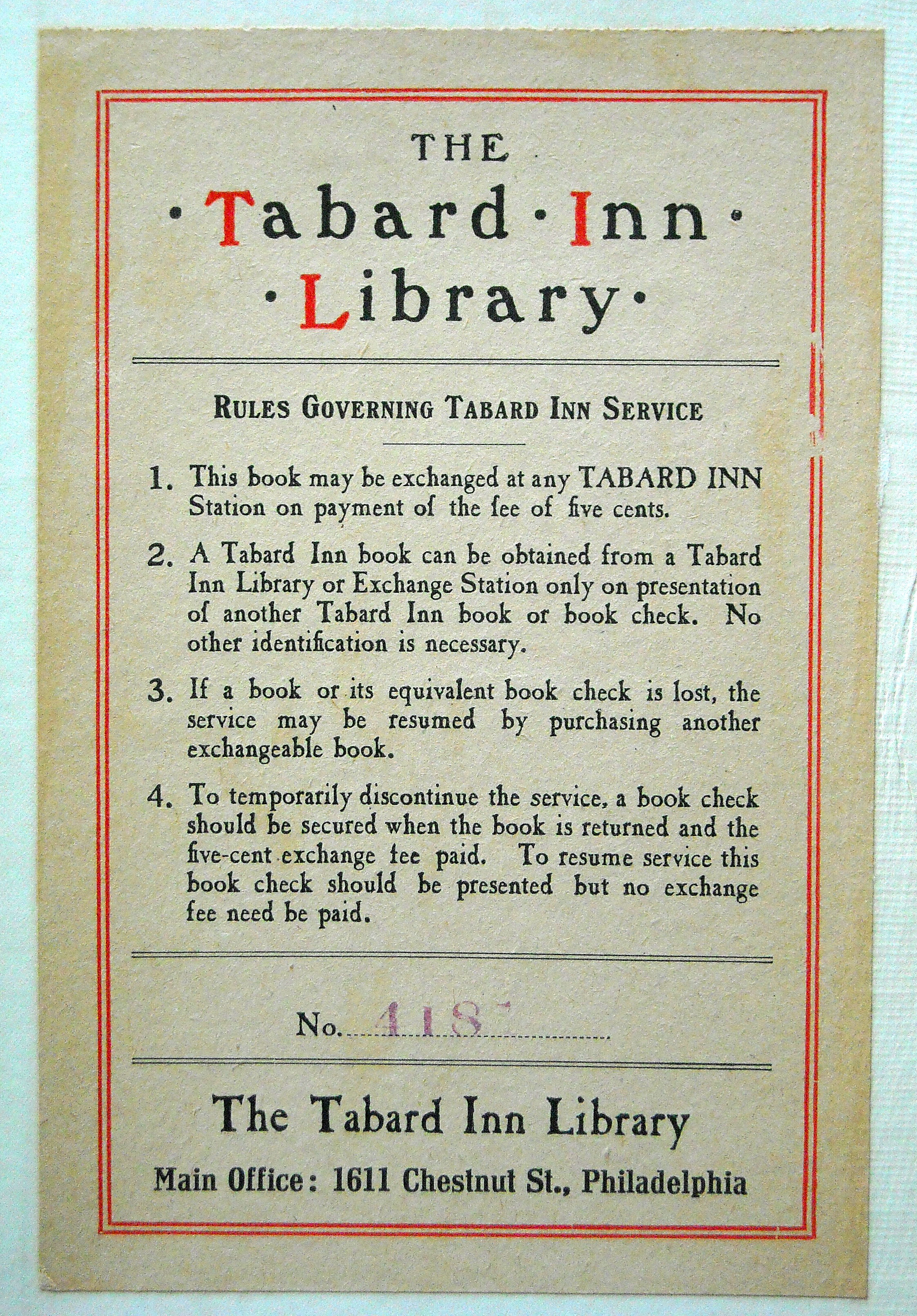
Bookplate No. 4187 with rules

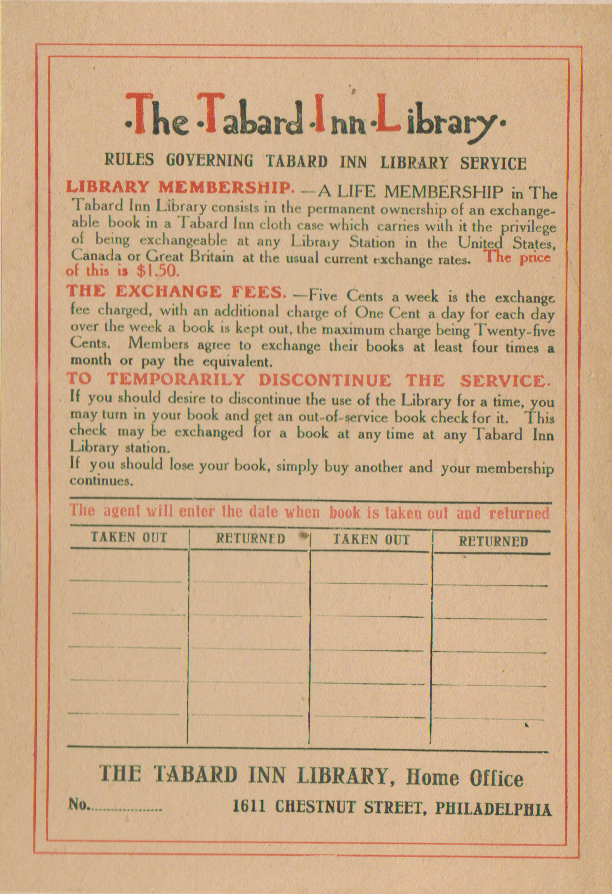
Bookplate of Rules (1908)

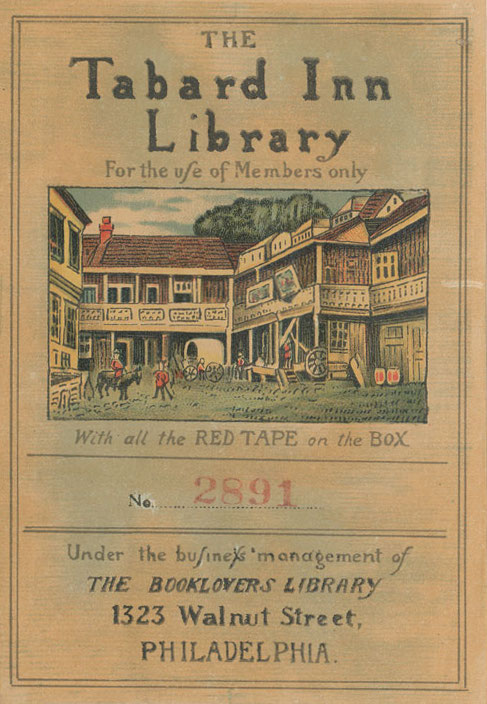
Bookplate No. 2891

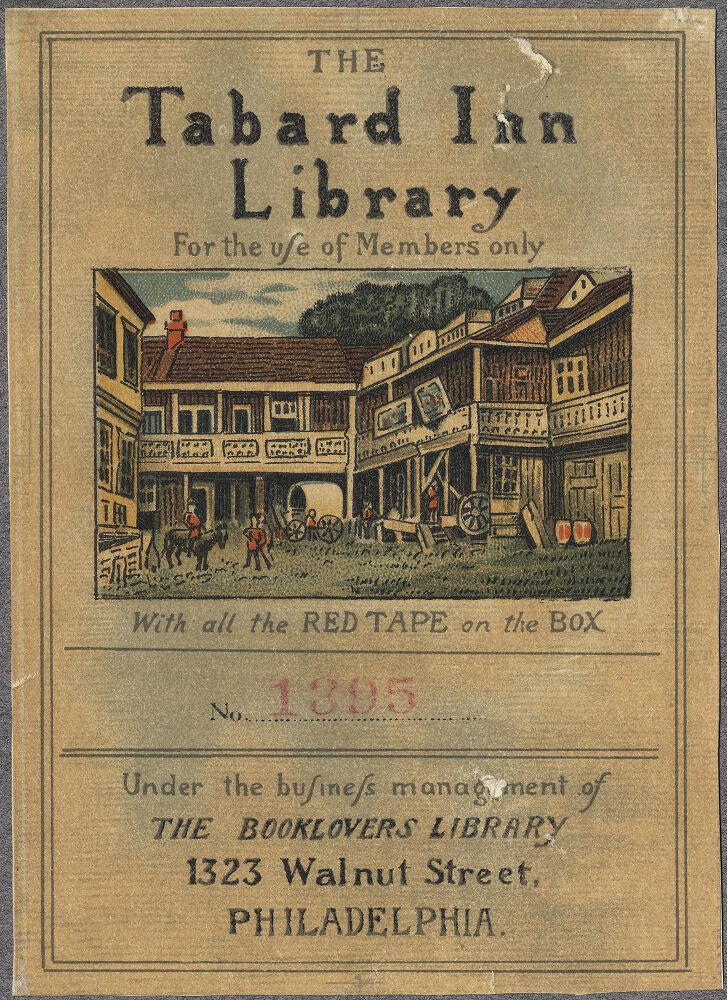
Bookplate No. 1395

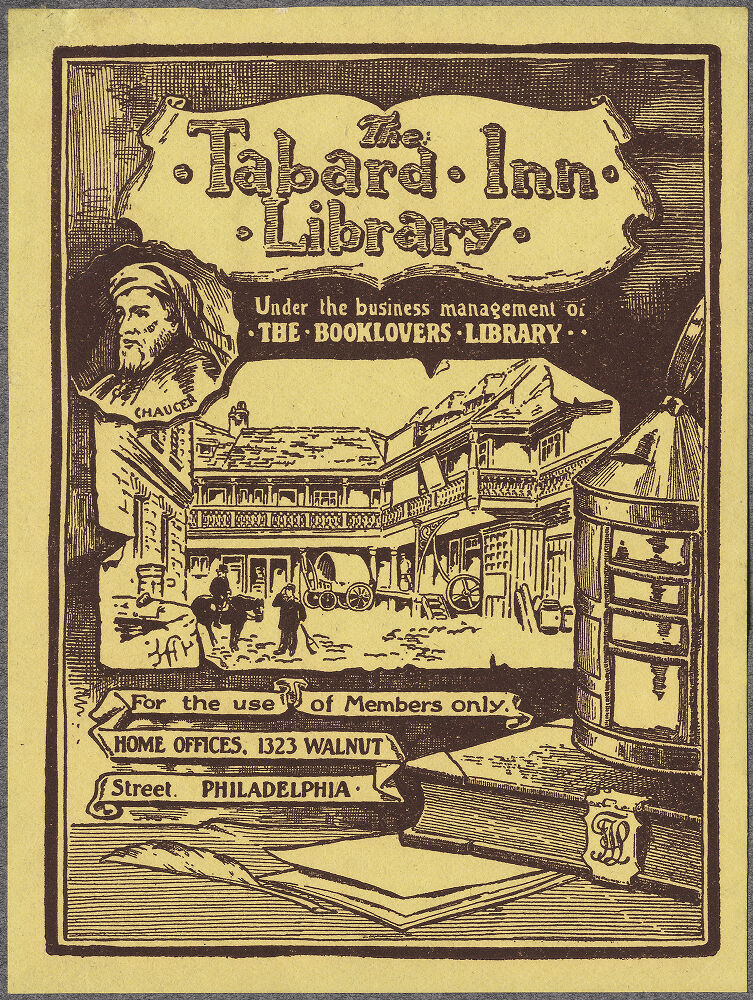
Bookplate: drawn building

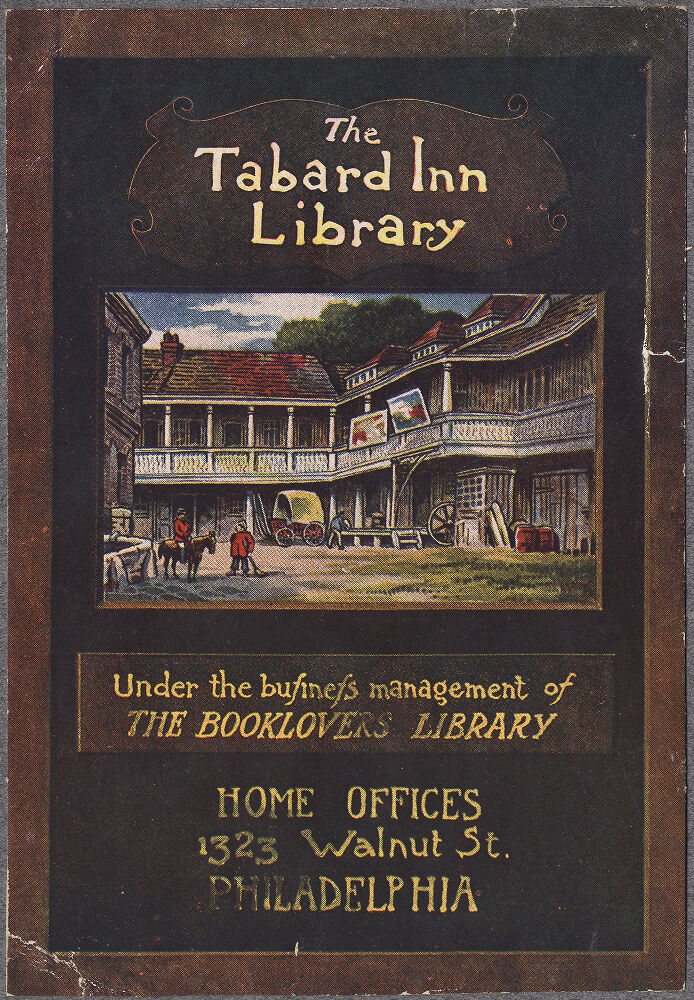
Dark Bookplate: building in color

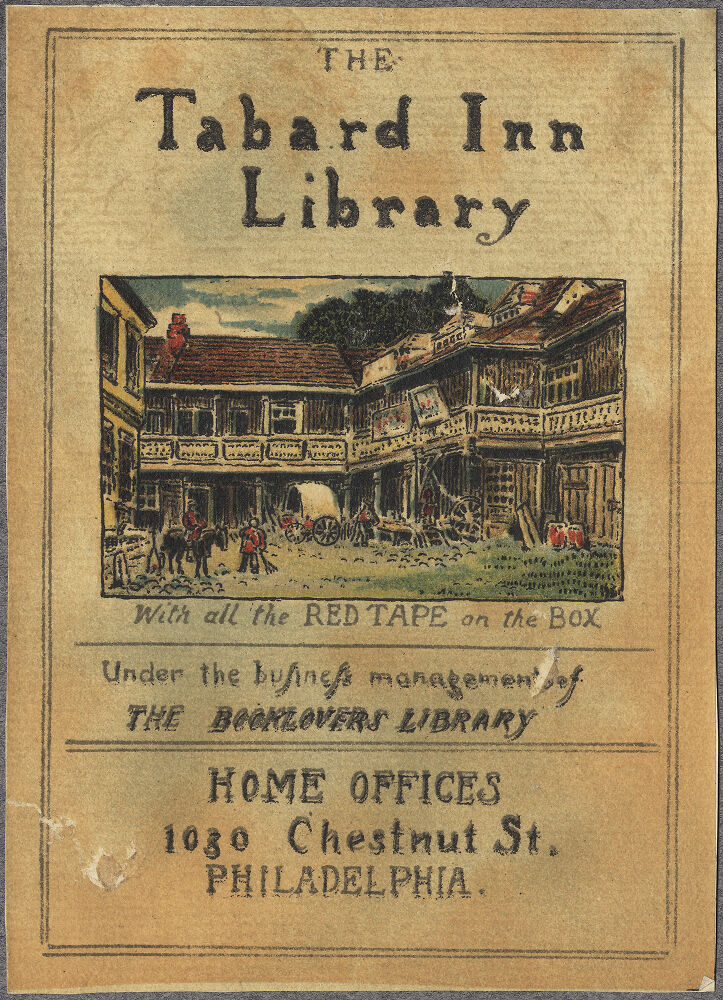
Light bookplate: building in color
