= The Moffat Museum =

Children's book

- The Moffat Museum
- Author: Eleanor Estes
- Illustrator: Eleanor Estes
- Series: The Moffats
- Genre: Children's novel
- Publisher: Harcourt, Brace & World
- Publication date: 1983
- ISBN: 9780152025533
- Preceded by: Rufus M.

The Moffat Museum by Eleanor Estes is the fourth and final novel in the children's series known as The Moffats. Published in 1983, it appeared forty years after the preceding book. The title refers to a small museum that the four Moffat children set up to help them remember the special times in their lives now that they are growing up. Like the rest of the series, The Moffat Museum is set in small Cranbury, Connecticut in the early 1900s.

== Plot ==
"The Moffats should have a museum! Suddenly the idea popped into Jane's head…" Staring idly at the family's barn one day, Jane gets the amazing idea for a Moffat Family Museum, to hold any first or treasured things the Moffat children can think of. The first artifact for their museum is the bike that all four of them used to learn to ride.

Rufus' teacher will be spending the summer in London, and she tells the class about the wax museum she plans on visiting while she's there. Rufus is inspired to become a wax statue for the museum, and gathers all the crayons and candles and odd bits of wax in the house to transform himself into "Rufus, the Waxworks Boy".

It's a good time for the Moffats to be storing up memories, because things are changing. Baby Rufus is growing up, and Sylvie is getting ready to marry Reverend Mr. Abbot. Soon Joey will be taking a full-time job. But the museum helps them celebrate and remember their past as they face the future together.

== Reception ==
Kirkus Reviews gave The Moffat Museum a starred review for ""books of remarkable merit", saying that "Estes has lost none of her feel for childhood's small, chance ecstasies--and the Moffats, have lost none of their small-town 1919 appeal… A notable series goes on undiminished--for a third generation of child-readers." Taking note of the forty years between the previous book and this one, Anita Silvey says "the writing style proves the writer's ear was still well tuned to the language and thoughts of children". Pointing out that the book doesn't leave out the difficulties a low-income family might experience at that time, Silvey also praises the sense of sadness some of the characters feel at the changes taking place. American Writers for Children calls the author's depiction of families perceptive, and says the Moffat books make a "significant and lasting" contribution to children's literature.
