= Anthony Bliss =

Anthony Bliss was a clergyman of the Church of England, and the vicar of Portsmouth.

Bliss was a member of Worcester College, Oxford and was awarded the degrees of B.A. in 1719, M.A. in 1722, and D.D. in 1733. He was ordained in 1722 and was the Vicar of Portsmouth from 1724 until his death in 1738. As a theologian, he wrote against Thomas Chubb's idea that reason alone is sufficient in theology.

His books included

- A Sermon Preach'd in the Parish-church of Portsmouth, on Saturday January XXX. 1725
- A Letter in Vindication of God's Prescience of Contingencies against the Objections of Mr. Fancourt, in His Late Essay on Liberty, Grace, and Prescience (1730): a reply to Samuel Fancourt's Essay on Liberty, Grace, and Prescience
- Observations on Mr. Chubb's Discourse Concerning Reason (1731): a reply to Thomas Chubb's Discourse Concerning Reason
- Remarks on the plea, and the defence of the plea, for human reason (1733): a reply to John Jackson's A Plea for Humane Reason and A Defense of the Plea for Human Reason: Being a Reply to a Book Entitled, A Plea for Divine Retribution
- Calumny and Defamation Displayed: or, a Brief essay on a new theological question, viz. Whether charity be a damning heresy? In a letter to the Reverend Mr. Du-Gard of Fareham in Hampshire (1735): William Du-Gard responded with Calumny and Defamation Retorted: Or, Some Brief Animadversions Upon an Erroneous and Dangerous Position, Lately advanced and defended from the Press

Bliss' son, also named Anthony Bliss, was a member of Queen's College, Oxford and was awarded the degree of B.A. in 1751. He was the Vicar of Meriden and the incumbent of Castle Bromwich, both in the County of Warwick. On his death in 1815 his estate passed to James Kittermaster.
