= Ann Nolan Clark =

American writer (1896–1995)

- Born: Anna Marie Nolan; December 5, 1896; Las Vegas, New Mexico, U.S.
- Died: December 13, 1995 (aged 99); Arizona, U.S.
- Education: New Mexico Normal School
- Occupation: Writer
- Spouse: Thomas Patrick Clark (m. 1919)
- Children: 1
- Writing career
- Notable awards: Newbery Medal (1953)

Ann Nolan Clark, born Anna Marie Nolan (December 5, 1896 – December 13, 1995), was an American writer who won the 1953 Newbery Medal.

== Biography ==
Born in Las Vegas, New Mexico in 1896, Clark graduated from New Mexico Normal School (now New Mexico Highlands University) in Las Vegas at age 21, and married Thomas Patrick Clark on August 6, 1919. She gave birth to an only son, Thomas Patrick, Jr., who later died as a pilot in World War II.

She began her career teaching English at what is now the Highlands University. However, in the early 1920s, she transferred to a job teaching children how to read for the Tesuque pueblo people, which lasted for 25 years. Clark found that the underfunded Tesuque School couldn't afford any substantial instructional material. In the process of teaching the children about literature, she incorporated their voices and stories to write In My Mother's House, and other books for the 1st to 4th grade one-room schoolhouse. She wrote about this process, and about her travels to many parts of Central and South America, in her nonfiction book, Journey to the People.

Between 1940 and 1951, the United States Bureau of Indian Affairs published 15 of her books, all relating to her experiences with the Tesuque pueblo people. Her book In My Mother's House, illustrated by Pueblo artist Velino Herrera, was named a Caldecott Honor book in 1942.

In 1945, the Institute for Inter-American Affairs sent Clark to live and travel for five years in Mexico, Guatemala, Costa Rica, Ecuador, Peru, and Brazil. Those experiences led her to write books such as Magic Money, Looking-for-Something, and Secret of the Andes, which won the 1953 Newbery Medal. In the 1940s she also wrote books for the Haskell Foundation and the Haskell Indian Nations University at Lawrence, KS; one of them " The Slim Butte Raccoon" was illustrated by Andrew Standing Soldier.

She also won the Catholic Library Association's 1963 Regina Medal, and the Bureau of Indian Affairs' 1962 Distinguished Service Award. Clark died in 1995 in Arizona, after writing 31 books that took a glance at Native American culture, mostly through the eyes of its children.

Mr. Clark's birth family was well known in the early 20th century in her hometown of Las Vegas, New Mexico, and their home, the Nolan House, is on the National Register of Historic Places as one of the first quarry stone houses there.

== Writings ==
- A Courier In New Mexico, manuscript by Mabel Parsons, printed by Ann Nolan Clark's elementary school class at Tesuque Pueblo (1936) (see account in her book, Journey To The People)
- Who Wants To Be A Prairie Dog? (1940)
- Little Boy With Three Names, Stories of Taos Pueblo (1940)
- Pine Ridge Porcupine (1940)
- Little Herder in Spring (1940)
- Little Herder in Summer (1942)
- Little Herder in Autumn (1940)
- Little Herder in Winter (1942)
- A Child's Story of New Mexico (1941)
- In My Mother's House (1941)
- Buffalo Caller (1942)
- There Still Are Buffalo (1942)
- The Slim Butte Raccoon (1942)
- Little Navajo Bluebird (1943)
- The Grass Mountain Mouse (1943)
- The Hen Of Wahpeton (1943)
- Young Hunter of Picuris (1943)
- Bringer of the Mystery Dog (1943)
- Brave Against The Enemy (1944)
- Sun Journey (1945)
- Magic Money (1950)
- Looking For Something (1952)
- Secret of the Andes (1952)
- Singing Sioux Cowboy Reader (1954)
- Blue Canyon Horse (1954)
- The Little Indian Pottery Maker (1955)
- Santiago (1955)
- Third Monkey (1956)
- A Santo For Pasqualita (1959)
- World Song (1960)
- Paco's Miracle (1962)
- The Desert People (1962)
- Tia Maria's Garden (1963)
- Medicine Man's Daughter (1963)
- The Little Indian Basket Maker (1963)
- Father Kino, Priest To The Pimas (1963)
- A Keepsake (1963)
- This For That (1965)
- Bear Cub (1965)
- Brother André of Montreal (1967)
- Arizona For Young People (1968)
- Summer Is For Growing (1968)
- These Were The Valiant (1969)
- Journey To The People (1969)
- Along Sandy Trails (1969)
- Circle of Seasons (1970)
- Hoofprint on the Wind (1972)
- Year Walk (1975)
- All This Wild Land (1976)
- To Stand Against The Wind (1978)
- In The Land Of Small Dragon (1979)

== See also ==
- American literature
