= Seymour Eaton =

American writer

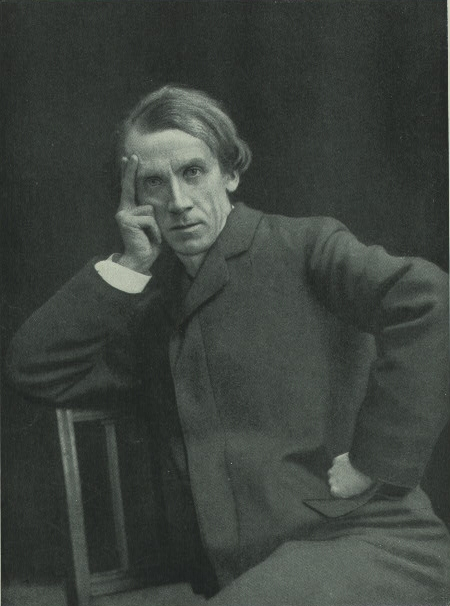
- Born: May 7, 1859; Grey County, Canada West
- Died: March 13, 1916 (aged 56); Lansdowne, Pennsylvania, United States
- Writing career
- Pen name: Paul Piper

Signature
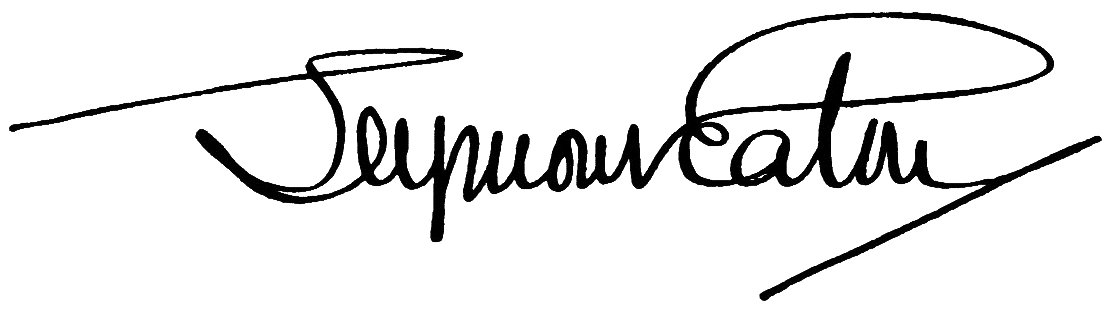

Seymour Eaton (May 7, 1859 – March 13, 1916) was a Canadian-born American author, journalist, editor, and publisher. He founded the Booklovers' Library in 1900 which became known as the world's largest circulating library, The Tabard Inn Library and is credited with coining the name "Teddy bear". He also organized The Thinkers Club.

Born in the community of Epping in Grey County, Canada West, Eaton was educated in Canadian schools and taught in district schools for seven years. He became a resident of Boston in 1880, and from there went to Philadelphia in 1892. Eaton founded, in the United States and Britain, the Booklovers' and Tabard Inn libraries. For five years he was director of the Drexel Institute of Philadelphia. He was for five years a daily contributor to the Chicago Record and founded and edited the Booklovers' Magazine until it was merged into Appleton's Magazine. He wrote several college textbooks, the novel: Dan Black, Editor and Proprietor, and children's books The Roosevelt Bears and Prince Domino and Muffles, written under the pen name Paul Piper.

Eaton married Jennie V. Adair in Winnipeg, Manitoba, on January 15, 1884. They had three sons: Frank, Jack, and Seymour Jr. Eaton died at his home in Lansdowne, Pennsylvania, aged 56. Upon his death, the Philadelphia Evening Ledger stated that "he made it interesting to read and exciting to think" and credited him with cultivating in Americans the graces of civilization, which they were otherwise too busy to acquire on their own.
