= Eau Claire Public Library =

- U.S. National Register of Historic Places
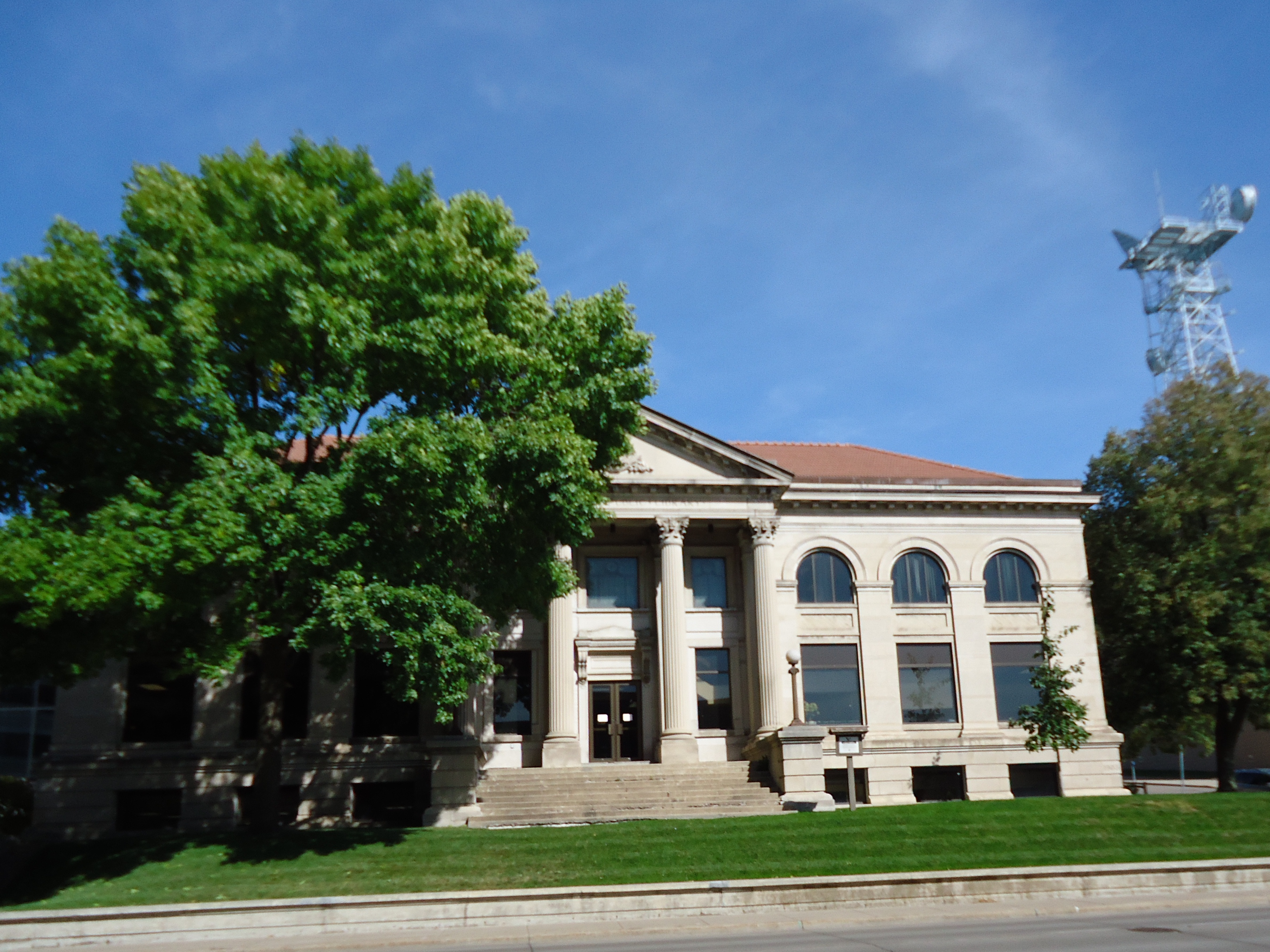
- Location: 217 S. Farwell St., Eau Claire, Wisconsin
- Coordinates: 44°48′43″N 91°29′53″W
- Area: less than one acre
- Built: 1903
- Architect: Patton & Miller
- Architectural style: Beaux-Arts
- MPS: Eau Claire MRA
- NRHP reference No.: 83003380
- Added to NRHP: January 28, 1983

The Eau Claire Public Library building is located in Eau Claire, Wisconsin.

== History ==
The structure housed a public library until the late 1970s, at which time it was converted into a municipal office building. It was a Carnegie library. The building was listed on the National Register of Historic Places in 1983 and on the State Register of Historic Places in 1989.
