= Appleton's Magazine =

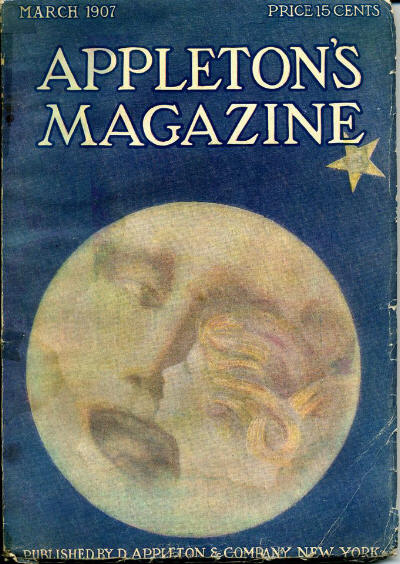
March 1907 cover

Appleton's Magazine was an American magazine about books and literature. Founded by Seymour Eaton in 1903 as The Booklovers Magazine, it was purchased by D. Appleton & Company in 1904. Its name was changed to Appleton's Booklovers Magazine and finally to Appleton's Magazine. Publication ended in 1909. Its peak circulation was around 100,000 copies.

D. Appleton & Company had previously published a similar journal of literature, science and art called Appletons' Journal (1869–1881).
