= Jacob Blanck =

American bibliographer (1906–1974)

- Born: Jacob Nathaniel Blanck; November 10, 1906; Boston
- Died: December 23, 1974 (aged 68); Brigham and Women's Faulkner Hospital

Jacob Nathaniel Blanck (November 10, 1906 – December 23, 1974) was an American bibliographer, editor, and children's writer. Born in Boston, he attended local schools and briefly ran a bookshop before being hired to assist on a bibliography of American first editions. He wrote for periodicals on the book trade and worked as a bibliographer in libraries including the Library of Congress in the 1940s and 1950s. Blanck also published two children's books. In the early 1940s, he founded a bibliography project that became Bibliography of American Literature, a selective bibliography of American literature. It was completed by 1992, after Blanck's death.

== Early life and education ==
Jacob Nathaniel Blanck was born on November 10, 1906, in Boston, Massachusetts, to Mildred Rosenberg (Friedman) and Selig Blanck. He attended Boston public schools, including the Commercial High School (possibly Boston's High School of Commerce (Boston)) but did not go to college. He started the Galleon Book Shop in Boston in 1929, which folded.

== Career ==
Blanck edited a rare book section in Publishers Weekly from 1936 to 1947, when it moved to the Antiquarian Bookman and was published there until 1952. Around that time, he also worked as a bibliographer at the Library of Congress (1939–1941) and briefly at the Indiana Historical Society, in 1941.

Merle Johnson, a bibliographer and rare book expert, hired Blanck to help him revise American First Editions, a second edition of which was released in 1932. In 1936 and 1942, Blanck published revised editions of American First Editions.

In the early 1940s, Blanck suggested to the Bibliographical Society of America that it sponsor a bibliography of American literature. In his view, the two existing general bibliographies of American books—American Authors 1795–1895 (1897) by P. K. Foley, and Merle Johnson's American First Editions—were not well suited for literary study, because they were either outdated or focused primarily on book collecting as opposed to scholarly research. The Lilly Endowment provided funding and Carroll A. Wilson, a book collector, was named chair of the project. Formally begun on January 1, 1944, it became Bibliography of American Literature, a study of all first editions by 300 American authors selected for their literary importance. Only writers of belles-lettres or literary fiction were included. The first volume was published in 1955. By 1970, Blanck had completed almost 13,000 entries on 173 authors. The project was finished in 1992, after Blanck's death. In a 2002 guide, critic James L. Harner describes Bibliography of American Literature as "one of the monumental bibliographies of the twentieth century".

He wrote two children's books: Jonathan and the Rainbow (1948), about a boy who saves a rainbow after it is taken by a pirate; and The King and the Noble Blacksmith (1950), about a child king who is helped by the titular blacksmith.

He died on December 23, 1974, at Faulkner Hospital (now Brigham and Women's Faulkner Hospital) in Boston.

== Assessment ==
Frederick M. Meek of the Massachusetts Historical Society pointed to his "hard work, incredible amount of knowledge, unusual memory and recall" combined with "a deep sensitive pride in what he did" which made him "the authority in his field – the field of American literature bibliography – culminating in BAL".

A sign of the high respect in which bibliographers hold Blanck is the National Library of Australia's review on Chester W. Topp's Victorian Yellowbacks and Paperbacks, 1849-1905 in which Blanck is praised as follows: "a unique and major accomplishment in bibliographic studies in the tradition of Jacob Blanck, Michael Sadleir, Joseph Sabin and others".

== Publications ==
=== Books ===
- Peter Parley to Penrod: A Bibliographical Description of the Best-Loved American Juvenile Books (1938)
- Jonathan and the Rainbow (1948)
- The King and the Noble Blacksmith (1950)
- Bibliography of American Literature (1955–91)

=== Articles ===
- Targ, William, ed. (1969) [1957]. "A Twentieth-Century Look at Nineteenth-Century Children's Books". Bibliophile in the Nursery: A Bookman's Treasury of Collectors' Lore on Old and Rare Children's Books. Metuchen, New Jersey: World Publishing Company; Scarecrow Reprint Corp. pp. 427–451. OCLC 1147709660.

== Works cited ==
- Bond, W. H. (1992). "Jacob Blanck and BAL". The Papers of the Bibliographical Society of America. 86 (2): 129–145. doi:10.1086/pbsa.86.2.24302951. ISSN 0006-128X. JSTOR 24302951. S2CID 181275437.
- Gallup, Donald (1998). What Mad Pursuits! More Memories of a Yale Librarian. New Haven, Connecticut: Beinecke Rare Book & Manuscript Library. ISBN 0-8457-3132-7. OCLC 38964134.
- Harner, James L. (2002). Literary Research Guide: An Annotated Listing of Reference Sources in English Literary Studies (4th ed.). New York: Modern Language Association. ISBN 0-87352-982-0. OCLC 48691433.
- Stoddard, Roger E. (April 16, 1975). "Jacob Nathaniel Blanck" (PDF). Proceedings of the American Antiquarian Society. 85 (1): 47–51. ISSN 0044-751X.
- Tanselle, G. Thomas (1975). "The Descriptive Bibliography of American Authors". In Brenni, Vito Joseph (ed.). Essays on Bibliography. Scarecrow Press. pp. 246–267. ISBN 0-8108-0826-9. OCLC 1341553.
