= Circulating library =

For-profit library

A circulating library (also known as lending libraries and rental libraries) lent books to subscribers, and was first and foremost a business venture. The intention was to profit from lending books to the public for a fee.

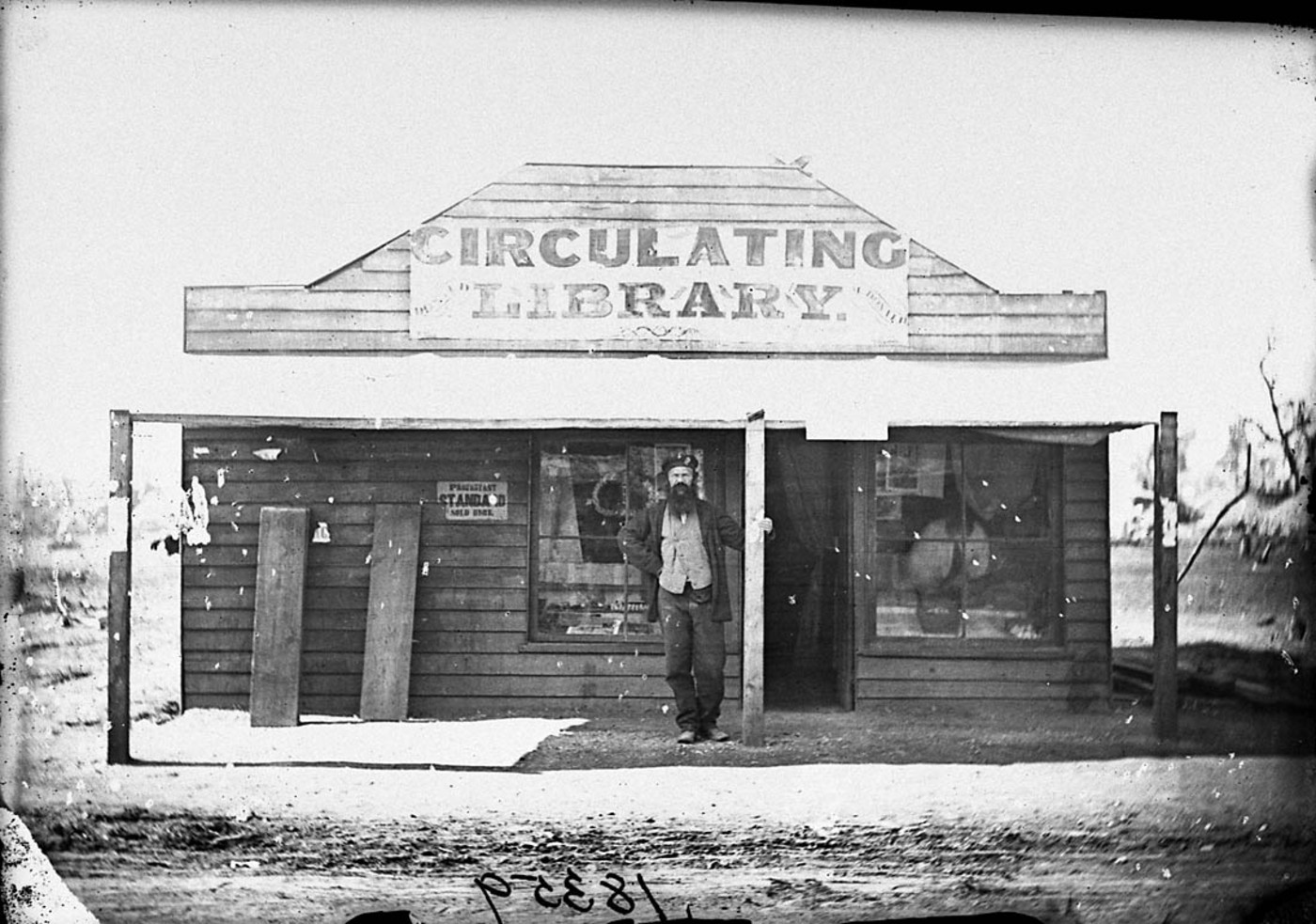
Donald McDonald, stationer, and his Circulating Library, Gulgong, 1870

== Overview ==
Circulating libraries offered an alternative in the 18th and 19th centuries to the large number of readers who could not afford the price of new books but also desired new reading material. Many circulating libraries were perceived as the provider of sensational novels to a female clientele but that was not always the case. Many private circulating libraries in Europe were created for scientific and/or literary audiences. In Britain, readers in the middle classes depended on these institutions to provide access to the latest fiction novels; they required a substantial subscription that many lower class readers couldn't afford.

Circulating libraries were important cultural institutions in Britain and America during the 18th and 19th centuries, affording the rising middle class access to a broad range of reading material including poetry, plays, histories, biography, philosophy, travels, and especially fiction.

Circulating libraries were of three major types: specialist libraries; book clubs; and commercial libraries, which developed in major cities and most notably offered a wide collection of novels. Although university and college libraries flourished, as did special libraries for governments, associations, and businesses, these were still not open to the general public.

Circulating libraries rented out bestsellers in large numbers, allowing publishers to increase their earnings and authors to increase their readership. The relationship between publishers and circulating libraries was so good that publishers offered discounts to circulating libraries. Publishers and circulating libraries became decreasingly dependent on each other in the nineteenth century for their mutual profit. Circulating libraries also influenced book publishers to keep producing expensive volume-based books instead of a single-volume format (see Three-volume novel). However, when bestselling fiction titles went out of fashion quickly, many circulating libraries were left with inventory they could neither sell nor rent out. This is one of the reasons why circulating libraries, such as Charles Edward Mudie, were eventually forced to close their doors in response to cheaper alternatives.

It is complicated to precisely define circulating libraries and specifically what separates them from other types of libraries. In the time period of circulating libraries, there were other libraries, such as subscription libraries, that operated in a similar fashion but were not the same. However, when both types of libraries were commonplace, the terms circulating libraries and subscription libraries "were completely interchangeable." It was logical that they were considered to be the same since both libraries circulated books and charged a subscription fee. The libraries differed in their intent. Circulating libraries’ intent was financial gain, and subscription libraries intended to obtain literary and scholarly works to share with others.

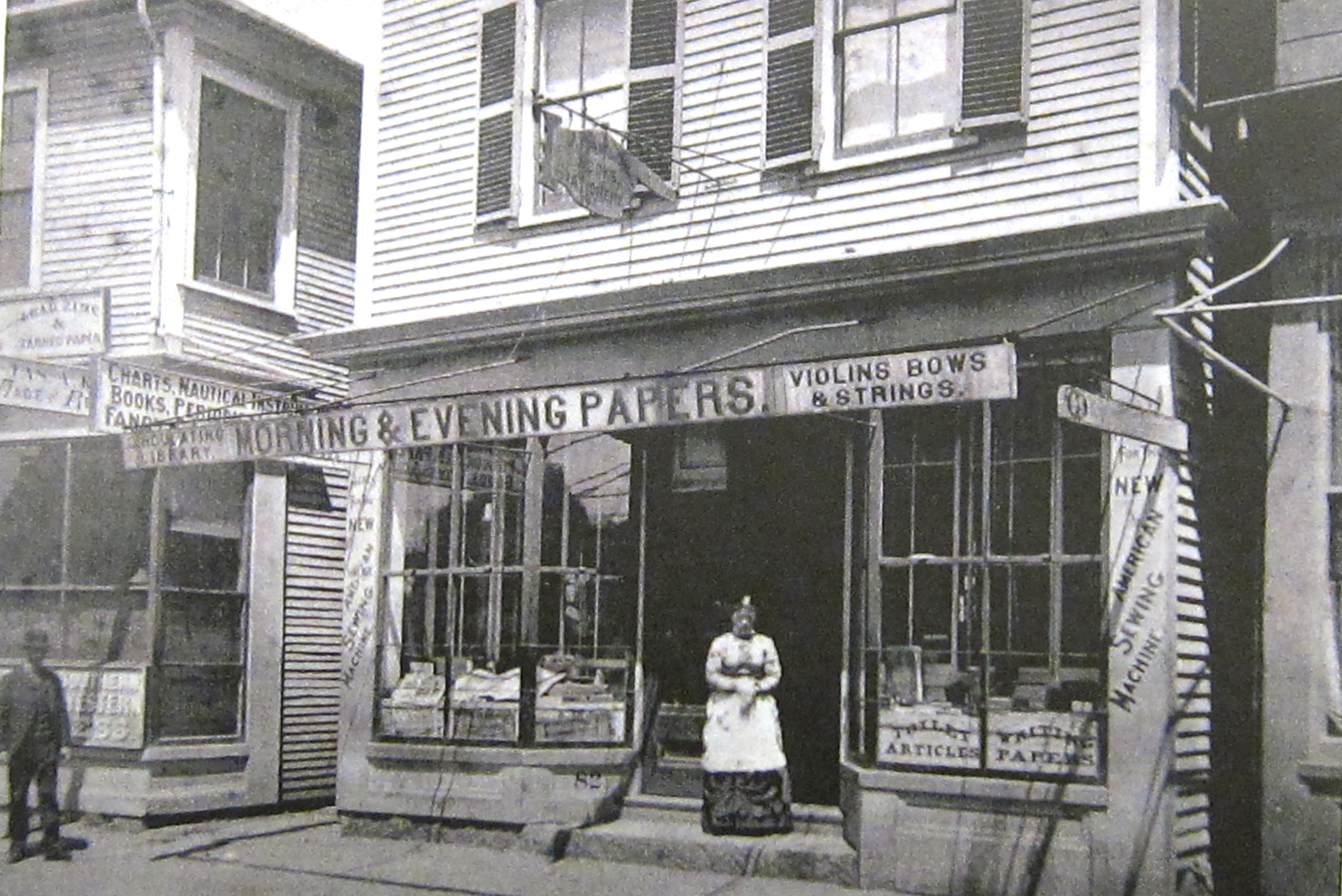
No. 82 Main Street, Gloucester, Massachusetts

Circulating libraries were popular in the 18th and 19th centuries and were located in large and small communities. Often, they were operated out of stores that sold other items such as newspapers and books. Sometimes they were in stores that sold items completely unrelated to books. They were often important social establishments, where users would go to see and be seen. In resort towns, they were often quite fashionable, with visitors subscribing for the season. The fees were for long periods of time such ranging from several months to a year. Eventually, the fees changed to daily rates to try to entice customers in some libraries.

One difference between circulating libraries and other libraries was that their collection reflected public demand, which led to larger collections of fiction. When circulation of a particular book decreased, it was sold. Another difference was the customers of circulating libraries were often female. These factors contributed to the popularity of circulating libraries. Circulating libraries were the first to serve women and actively seek out their patronage. It was not a coincidence that some of these libraries were located in millinery and stationery stores and midwives' offices. Circulation libraries would also employ single women, widows, and retired women.

=== Early circulating libraries ===
- 1725, Allan Ramsay opened the first circulating library in Edinburgh, Scotland.
- 1728, the first circulating library in England was opened by James Leake.
- 1745, year of dissolution of a circulating library operated by Samuel Fancourt
- 1762, the first circulating library in America was opened in Annapolis, Maryland by William Rind.

== Criticism of circulating libraries and novels ==
The late 18th century was when novels became commonplace. The demand for novels was high but the cost of them made them inaccessible for many. They held wide appeal because they were less complex than more scholarly types of literature. However, novels did not have an overwhelmingly popular reception.

Some aspects of novels were realistic, which made them appealing and relatable. The elements of novels that made them sensational and alluring were the parts that deviated from what would usually happen in reality. Society feared that people, mainly women, would not be able to differentiate between the realistic and completely fictional elements, that the novels would cause people to have unrealistic expectations of life.

Circulating libraries were highly criticized at the height of their popularity for being providers of novels. The views about novels and their readers, sellers, and writers went beyond simple criticism to being slanderous.

== Publishing ==
Some circulating libraries were publishers although many did not have widespread distribution for the works they printed. By the end of the 18th century, they had increased the amount of fiction they published. They favored publishing works from women whereas other publishers still favored works by men.

It was common for people to publish their works anonymously. Circulating library publishers were known for publishing anonymous works, and it is believed that many of the ones they published were written by women. Circulating library publishers were not viewed as favorably as other major publishers since they printed works that were considered unsavory by society. People may have wanted their works to be anonymous to avoid the stigma of being associated with a publisher with a dubious reputation. By allowing for women to be published, and for works to be published anonymously, circulating libraries aided with the creation of sub-genres like the gothic novels.

== Decline ==
By the beginning of the 20th century the ways people procured books had changed, and circulating libraries were no longer the favored way of obtaining them. The biggest contributor to the contraction of circulating libraries was the reduced price of books, which made them more accessible to the public, who became less reliant on circulating libraries. In an attempt to compensate for the loss of revenue, the subscription fees were lessened to daily rates down from monthly or yearly ones.

Commercial circulating libraries were still common into the 20th century, although public libraries becoming commonplace contributed to their decline. Another contributing factor was the introduction of paperback books, which were less expensive to purchase.

In the UK, the retail chain WHSmith ran a library scheme from 1860, which lasted until 1961, when the library was taken over by that of Boots the Chemist. This, founded in 1898 and at one time to be found in 450 branches, continued until the last 121 disappeared in 1966.
