= Anita Silvey =

American writer

Anita Silvey is an American author, editor, and literary critic in the genre of children’s literature. Born in 1947 in Bridgeport, Connecticut, Silvey has served as Editor-in-Chief of The Horn Book Magazine and as vice-president at Houghton Mifflin where she oversaw children’s and young adult book publishing. She has also authored a number of critical books about children's literature, including 500 Great Books for Teens and The Essential Guide to Children's Books and Their Creators. In October 2010, she began publishing the Children's Book-A-Day Almanac online, a daily essay on classic and contemporary children's books.

== Work ==
In 1975, Silvey was a co-founder of the publication that became the Boston Review. She served from 1985 to 1995 as Editor-in-Chief of The Horn Book Magazine. She also created the spin-off magazine The Horn Book Guide to Children's and Young Adult Books.

Between 1995 and 2001, Silvey worked as vice president at Houghton Mifflin, where she oversaw children's and young-adult book publishing for both the Houghton and Clarion divisions. Among illustrators and authors whom she promoted were David Wiesner, Chris Van Allsburg, Virginia Lee Burton, and Lois Lowry.

In 2002, Silvey published The Essential Guide to Children's Books and Their Creators, 100 Best Books for Children and 500 Great Books for Teens. She also penned a young-adult book on women soldiers in the American Civil War, I'll Pass for Your Comrade. In 2008, she wrote an influential article in School Library Journal in which she "criticized the Newbery selections as too difficult for most children." A series of interviews with people from all walks of life was published in Everything I Need to Know I Learned from a Children's Book in 2009.

Silvey is a member of the editorial board of Cricket magazine and the board of directors for the Vermont Center for the Book. At Simmons University Graduate School of Library Science in Boston, Massachusetts, she teaches "Modern Book Publishing" and at St. Michael's College in Winooski, Vermont, she teaches "Children's Book Author Studies".

== Awards ==
In 2008, she won the Ludington Award of the Educational Paperback Association for lifetime dedication to children and books.

In 2000, Vermont College gave her an honorary master in fine arts in children's-book writing.

In 1994, she was acknowledged by her hometown of Fort Wayne, Indiana during the town's bicentennial celebration.

In 1987, she won the Women's National Book Association Book Women Award.

== Partial bibliography ==
- Undaunted: The Wild Life of Biruté Mary Galdikas and Her Fearless Quest to Save Orangutans, National Geographic Children's Books, 2019
- Let Your Voice Be Heard: The Life and Times of Pete Seeger, Clarion Books, 2016
- Untamed: The Wild Life of Jane Goodall, National Geographic Children's Books, 2015
- Children's Book-A-Day Almanac, Roaring Brook Press, 2012
- The Plant Hunters: True Stories of Their Daring Adventures to the Far Corners of the Earth, Farrar, Straus and Giroux, 2012
- Henry Knox: Bookseller, Soldier, Patriot, Clarion Books, 2010
- Everything I Need to Know I Learned from a Children's Book, Roaring Brook Press, 2009.
- I'll Pass For Your Comrade: Women Soldiers in the Civil War, Clarion Books, 2008.
- 500 Great Books for Teens, Houghton Mifflin Harcourt, 2006.
- 100 Best Books for Children: A Parent's Guide to Making the Right Choices for Your Young Reader, Toddler to Preteen, Houghton Mifflin Harcourt, 2005.
- The Essential Guide to Children's Books and Their Creators, Mariner Books, 2002.
- Help Wanted: Short Stories about Young People Working, Little Brown and Company, 1997.
- Children's Books and Their Creators, Houghton Mifflin Harcourt, 1995.
