= 1933 in literature =

This article contains information about the literary events and publications of 1933.

== Events ==
- February – Having joined the Japanese Communist Party, the Chinese novelist Hu Feng is arrested and "badly beaten" in Tokyo, Japan, for his protests against imperialism. Returning to the Republic of China as a popular hero, he is nevertheless prevented from joining the Chinese Communist Party by a rival, Zhou Yang.
- February 17 – The magazine News-Week is published for the first time in New York City, United States.
- March 8 – Premiere of Federico García Lorca's play Blood Wedding (Bodas de Sangre) is held at the Teatro Beatriz in Madrid, Spain.
- April 23 – Millosh Gjergj Nikolla is appointed schoolteacher among the Serbs of Vraka, Kingdom of Albania. The next two years bring his creative period as a short story writer, describing his sense of despair at being isolated in a backward region.

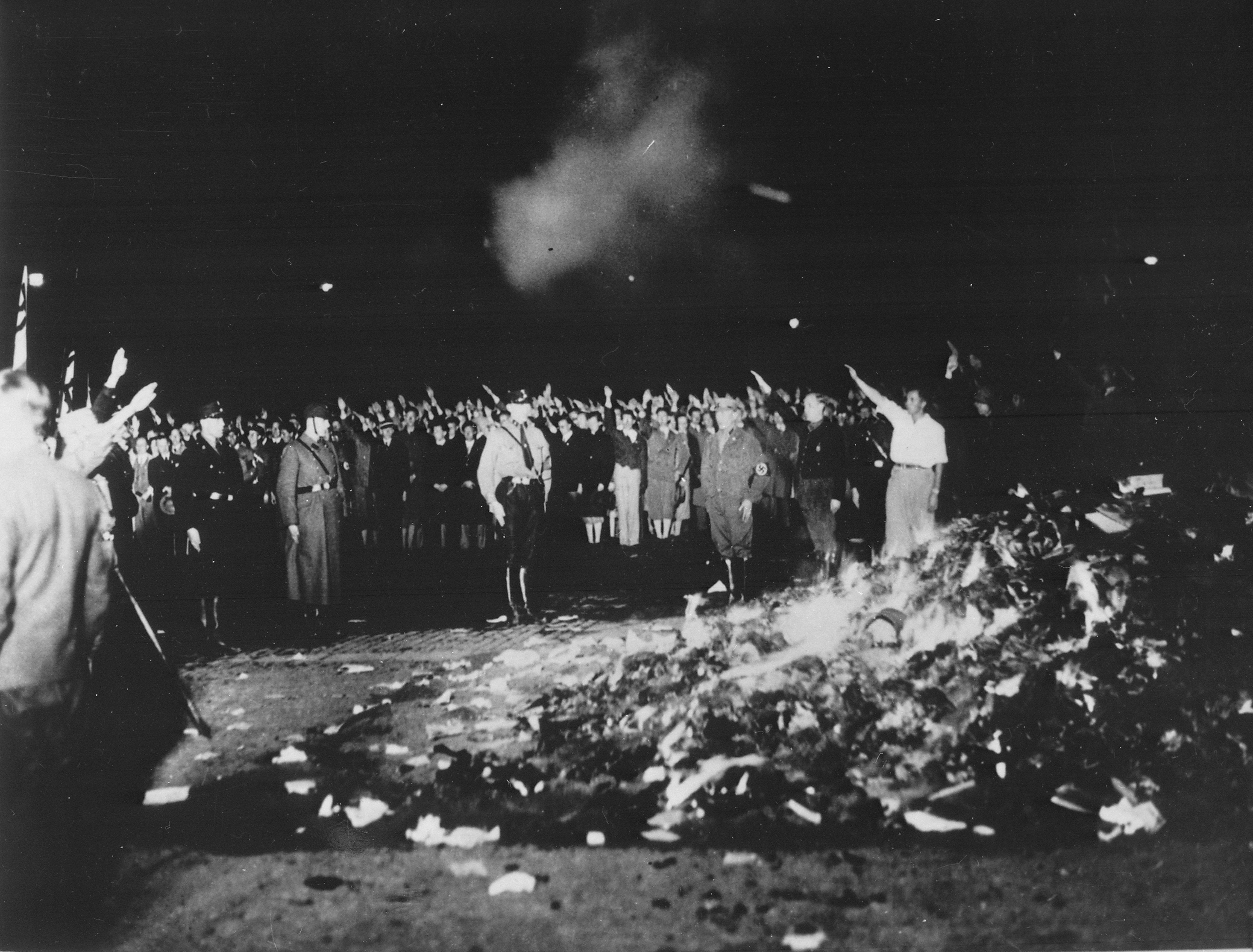
Book burning in the Opernplatz, Berlin, May 11, 1933

- May – Nazi book burnings take place in Germany by the German Student Union, principally of works by Jewish intellectuals, leading to an Exilliteratur. Although his novels are spared (unlike those of his brother Heinrich Mann), Thomas Mann settles in Switzerland. Lion Feuchtwanger, on a lecture tour of the United States in January, has decided not to return to Germany; Bertolt Brecht has moved to Prague in February; and Alfred Döblin to Switzerland in March.
- June
  - W. H. Auden has his "Vision of Agape".
  - Robert Walser, under treatment for schizophrenia since 1929, is placed in a sanatorium in Herisau, Switzerland. This ends his work as a writer, though he will live until 1956.
- July – Poedjangga Baroe, the Indonesian avant-garde literary magazine, is first published, by Armijn Pane, Amir Hamzah and Sutan Takdir Alisjahbana.
- October 8 – The General Union of Roma in Romania is set up by writer Gheorghe A. Lăzăreanu-Lăzurică, with Grigoraș Dinicu as honorary president; by 1934, it publishes the Romani-language newspaper O Ròm, and books of Romani mythology, edited by Constantin S. Nicolăescu-Plopșor.
- October
  - (approximate) The name Inklings, previously used by a disbanded undergraduate group, is taken by an informal literary discussion group of University of Oxford academics, including C. S. Lewis and J. R. R. Tolkien.
  - Friedo Lampe's novel Am Rande der Nacht (At the Edge of Night) is published in Germany but in December is suppressed by the Nazis on the grounds of its themes of homoeroticsm and interracial relationship. It is not republished until 1949, first published unexpurgated in 1999, and first in English translation in 2019.
- November 7 – Premiere of Samuil Lehtțir's Biruința (Victory), at Tiraspol's State Theater; it is the first local play to have been produced within the Moldavian Autonomous Soviet Socialist Republic.
- December
  - Codex Sinaiticus sold by the Soviet Union to the British Museum Library through the agency of Maggs Bros Ltd at a price of £100,000, the highest ever paid for a book at this time.
  - Raymond Chandler's first short story, the detective fiction "Blackmailers Don't Shoot", is published in the magazine Black Mask in the United States.
- December 6 – In United States v. One Book Called Ulysses, U.S. District Judge John M. Woolsey rules that James Joyce's novel Ulysses is not as a whole pornographic and therefore cannot be obscene.

== New books ==
=== Fiction ===
- Hervey Allen – Anthony Adverse
- Jorge Amado – Cacau (Cacao)
- Edwin Balmer and Philip Wylie – When Worlds Collide
- Marjorie Bowen – Album Leaf
- Edgar Rice Burroughs – Tarzan and the City of Gold
- Dino Buzzati – Bàrnabo delle montagne
- Erskine Caldwell – God's Little Acre
- John Dickson Carr – The Mad Hatter Mystery
- Leslie Charteris – Once More the Saint (also The Saint and Mr. Teal)
- Agatha Christie
  - The Hound of Death
  - Lord Edgware Dies
- J.J. Connington – Tom Tiddler's Island
- Freeman Wills Crofts – The Hog's Back Mystery
- A. J. Cronin – Grand Canary
- Warwick Deeping – Two Black Sheep
- Mircea Eliade – Bengal Nights (Mayitreyi)
- Guy Endore – The Werewolf of Paris
- Susan Ertz – The Proselyte
- Miles Franklin – Bring the Monkey
- John Galsworthy – One More River
- Matila Ghyka – Pluie d'étoiles
- Anthony Gilbert
  - Death in Fancy Dress
  - The Musical Comedy Crime
  - Portrait of a Murderer
- Walter Greenwood – Love on the Dole
- Dashiell Hammett – The Thin Man
- Ernest Hemingway – Winner Take Nothing
- Robert Hichens – The Paradine Case
- James Hilton
  - Knight Without Armour
  - Lost Horizon
- Volter Kilpi – Alastalon salissa (In the Parlour at Alastalo)
- Ronald Knox –The Body in the Silo
- Pär Lagerkvist – Bödeln (The Hangman; novella)
- Alexander Lernet-Holenia – I Was Jack Mortimer
- E. C. R. Lorac
  - The Case of Colonel Marchand
  - Death on the Oxford Road
- Arthur Machen – The Green Round
- Compton Mackenzie – Water on the Brain
- André Malraux – La Condition humaine
- Caroline Pafford Miller – Lamb in His Bosom
- A. A. Milne – Four Days' Wonder
- Camil Petrescu – Patul lui Procust (The Bed of Procrustes)
- E. R. Punshon – Information Received
- Ellery Queen
  - The American Gun Mystery
  - The Siamese Twin Mystery
- Raymond Queneau – Le Chiendent
- Marjorie Kinnan Rawlings – South Moon Under
- E. Arnot Robertson – Ordinary Families
- Profira Sadoveanu – Mormolocul (Tadopole)
- Dorothy L. Sayers
  - Hangman's Holiday (short stories)
  - Murder Must Advertise
- Bruno Schulz – The Street of Crocodiles (short stories, published as Sklepy cynamonowe, "Cinnamon Shops", in December, dated 1934)
- Gertrude Stein – The Autobiography of Alice B. Toklas
- John Steinbeck - To a God Unknown
- Gladys Bronwyn Stern – Long Lost Father
- Cecil Street
  - The Claverton Mystery
  - The Motor Rally Mystery
  - The Venner Crime
- Thomas F. Tweed – Rinehard: a melodrama of the nineteen-thirties
- S. S. Van Dine – The Kennel Murder Case
- John Vandercook – Murder in Trinidad
- Henry Wade – Mist on the Saltings
- Helen Waddell – Peter Abelard
- Hugh Walpole – Vanessa
- H. G. Wells – The Shape of Things to Come
- Franz Werfel – The Forty Days of Musa Dagh (Die vierzig Tage des Musa Dagh)
- Nathanael West – Miss Lonelyhearts
- Dennis Wheatley – The Forbidden Territory
- Antonia White – Frost in May
- Virginia Woolf – Flush: A Biography

=== Children and young people ===
- Marjorie Flack – The Story about Ping
- Norman Hunter – The Incredible Adventures of Professor Branestawm (first in Professor Branestawm series)
- Erich Kästner – The Flying Classroom
- Arthur Ransome – Winter Holiday
- Felix Salten – Florian: The Emperor’s Stallion
- Dorothy Wall – Blinky Bill: the Quaint Little Australian (first in the Blinky Bill series of three books)

=== Drama ===
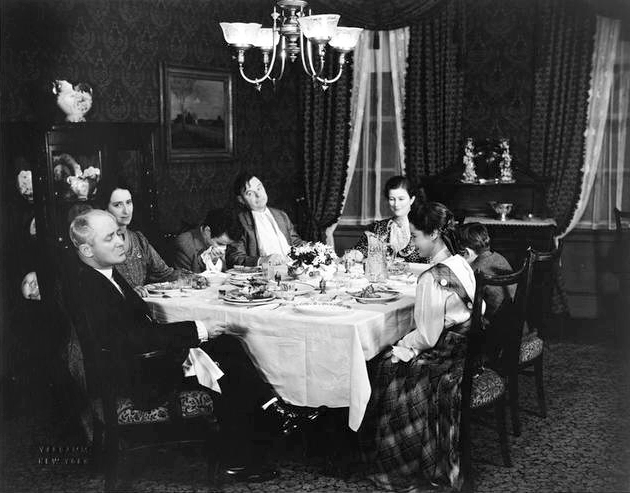
The original Broadway production of Ah, Wilderness!, with George M. Cohan, Elisha Cook, Jr., and Gene Lockhart

- Tawfiq al-Hakim – Ahl el-Kahf (The People of the Cave)
- Jean Anouilh – Mandarine
- Anthony Armstrong
  - Ten Minute Alibi
  - Without Witness
- Clifford Bax – The Rose Without a Thorn
- Ferdinand Bruckner – Die Rassen
- Gordon Daviot (Josephine Tey) – Richard of Bordeaux
- Selli Engler – Heil Hitler
- Walter Hackett – Afterwards
- Ian Hay – A Present from Margate
- Hanns Johst – Schlageter
- Sidney Kingsley – Men in White
- Samuil Lehtțir – Biruința (Victory)
- Federico García Lorca – Blood Wedding
- W. Somerset Maugham – Sheppey
- R. J. Minney – Clive of India
- Ivor Novello – Fresh Fields
- Eugene O'Neill – Ah, Wilderness!
- J. B. Priestley – Laburnum Grove
- Lennox Robinson – Drama at Inish
- Mordaunt Shairp – The Green Bay Tree
- John Van Druten – The Distaff Side
- Maxim Ziese – Siebenstein

=== Poetry ===
- Edwin James Brady – Wardens of the Seas
- Benjamin Fondane – Ulysse
- Mascha Kaléko – Das Lyrische Stenogrammheft: Verse vom Alltag
- Osip Mandelstam – "Stalin Epigram"
- Vita Sackville-West – Collected Poems
- Filip Shiroka – Zâni i zêmrës
- J. Slauerhoff – Soleares
- W. B. Yeats – The Winding Stair and Other Poems

=== Non-fiction ===
- Vera Brittain – Testament of Youth
- Albert Einstein and Sigmund Freud – Warum Krieg?
- Benjamin Fondane – Rimbaud le voyou
- Ionel Gherea – Le Moi el le monde. Essai d'une cosmogonie anthropomorphique (The Self and the World. An Essay in Anthropomorphic Cosmogony)
- Carl Jung – Modern Man in Search of a Soul
- Agnes Mure Mackenzie – An Historical Survey of Scottish Literature to 1714
- George Orwell – Down and Out in Paris and London
- Wilhelm Reich – The Mass Psychology of Fascism (Die Massenpsychologie des Faschismus)
- Upton Sinclair – Upton Sinclair Presents William Fox
- Muiris Ó Súilleabháin (Maurice O'Sullivan) – Fiche Bliain ag Fás (Twenty Years a-Growing)
- Jun'ichirō Tanizaki (谷崎 潤一郎) – In Praise of Shadows (陰翳礼讃, essay on aesthetics)

== Births ==
- January 1 – Joe Orton, English playwright (murdered 1967)
- January 2 – Seiichi Morimura (森村誠一), Japanese author (died 2023)
- January 4 – Phyllis Reynolds Naylor, American children's and adult novelist
- January 9 – Wilbur Smith, South African historical novelist (died 2021)
- January 13 – Shahnon Ahmad, Malaysian writer and politician (died 2017)
- January 16 – Susan Sontag (Susan Rosenblatt), American novelist (died 2004)
- January 25 – Alden Nowlan, Canadian poet and novelist (died 1983)
- February 1 – Reynolds Price, American novelist and literary scholar (died 2011)
- February 5 – B. S. Johnson, English novelist (died 1973)
- February 12 – Costa-Gavras (Konstantinos Gavras), Greek-French film director and writer
- February 20 – Zamenga Batukezanga, Congolese francophone writer and philanthropist (died 2000)
- February 21 – Virginia Driving Hawk Sneve, Native American author
- February 22 – Christopher Ondaatje, Ceylonese-born English travel writer, biographer and philanthropist
- February 27 – Edward Lucie-Smith, Jamaican-born English writer, critic and broadcaster
- March 17 – Penelope Lively (Penelope Low), Egyptian-born English novelist
- March 18 – Sergio Pitol, Mexican fiction writer, translator and diplomat (died 2018)
- March 19 – Philip Roth, American novelist (died 2018)
- April 2 – György Konrád, Hungarian novelist, essayist, political dissident and President of PEN International (died 2019)
- April 7 – Cong Weixi, Chinese author (died 2019)
- April 14 – Boris Strugatsky, Russian sci-fi writer (died 2012)
- April 24 – Patricia Bosworth, American writer/biographer (died 2020)
- May 9 – Jessica Steele, English romance novelist (died 2020)
- May 10 – Barbara Taylor Bradford (Barbara Taylor), English-born American novelist (died 2024)
- May 12 – Stephen Vizinczey, Hungarian-born writer (died 2021)
- May 22 – Arnold Lobel, American children's writer and illustrator (died 1987)
- May 29
  - Abdul Rahman Munif, Arab writer (died 2004)
  - Edward Whittemore, American novelist (died 1995)
- June 9 – Vicente Leñero, Mexican novelist and playwright (died 2014)
- June 11 – Martti Soosaar, Estonian journalist and author (died 2017)
- June 20 – Claire Tomalin (Claire Delavenay), English journalist and biographer
- June 25 – James Meredith, African-American civil rights activist, writer, political adviser and Air Force veteran
- June 30 – Mauricio Rosencof, Uruguayan playwright, poet and journalist
- July 2 – John Antrobus, English playwright and scriptwriter
- July 4 – David Littman, English historian (died 2012)
- July 10 – Kevin Gilbert, Australian writer and artist (died 1993)
- July 13 – David Storey, English novelist and playwright (died 2017)
- July 14 – Solange Fasquelle, French novelist (died 2016)
- July 15 – M. T. Vasudevan Nair, Indian novelist (died 2024)
- July 20 – Cormac McCarthy, American novelist, playwright and screenwriter (died 2023)
- July 21
  - John Gardner, American novelist (died 1982)
  - Brigitte Reimann, German novelist (died 1973)
- July 31 – Cees Nooteboom, Dutch poet and writer (died 2026)
- August 1 – Ko Un (Ko Untae), South Korean poet
- August 2 – Michel del Castillo, Spanish-born French writer (died 2024)
- August 7 – Jerry Pournelle, American science fiction writer (died 2017)
- August 13 – Madhur Jaffrey, Indian actress and food writer
- August 16 – Tom Maschler, Austrian-born English literary publisher (died 2020)
- September 8 – Michael Frayn, English playwright and novelist
- September 9 – Michael Novak, American philosopher and author (died 2017)
- September 19 – Gilles Archambault, French Canadian novelist
- September 27 – Paul Goble, English-American author and illustrator (died 2017)
- October 21 – Maureen Duffy, English poet, playwright, author and activist (died 2026)
- October 24 – Norman Rush, American writer
- November 1
  - Viačasłaŭ Adamčyk, Belarusian journalist, writer, playwright and screenwriter (died 2001)
  - Huub Oosterhuis, Dutch poet, theologian and liturgy reformer
  - Samir Roychoudhury, Indian Bengali poet and philosopher (died 2016)
- November 5 – Ilie Purcaru, Romanian journalist and poet (died 2008)
- November 13 – Peter Härtling, German novelist and poet (died 2017)
- November 23 – Daniel Chavarría, Uruguayan writer and translator (died 2018)
- December 2 – Kent Andersson, Swedish dramatist (died 2005)
- December 22 – Jim Barnes, Native American poet and translator
- December 31 – Edward Bunker, American crime novelist (died 2005)

== Deaths ==
- January 5 – J. M. Robertson, British Liberal Party politician, writer and journalist, Parliamentary Secretary to the Board of Trade (born 1856)
- January 11 – Hugo Zöller, German explorer and journalist (born 1852)
- January 21 – George Moore, Irish poet and novelist (born 1852)
- January 29 – Sara Teasdale, American poet (born 1884; suicide)
- January 31 – John Galsworthy, English novelist and dramatist (born 1867)
- February 20 – Takiji Kobayashi (小林多喜二), Japanese writer (born 1903)
- April 5 – Earl Derr Biggers, American novelist and playwright (heart attack, born 1884)
- April 19 – E. W. Hobson, English writer on mathematics (born 1856)
- April 24 – Janet Milne Rae, Scottish novelist (born 1844)
- April 29 – Constantine Cavafy, Greek Alexandrine poet (born 1863)
- April 30 – Anna de Noailles, French writer (born 1876)
- May 2 – Leonard Huxley, British writer (born 1860)
- May 16 – John Henry Mackay, Scottish-born German anarchist writer and philosopher (born 1864)
- May 26 – Horatio Bottomley, English journalist and fraudster (born 1860)
- June 7 – Dragutin Domjanić, Croatian poet (born 1875)
- June 27 – Jennie M. Bingham, American author (born 1859)
- July 8 – Anthony Hope (Anthony Hope Hawkins), English adventure novelist (born 1863)
- August 12 – Alexandru Philippide, Romanian linguist and polemicist (atherosclerosis, born 1859)
- September 20 – Annie Besant, English Theosophist writer (born 1847)
- September 22 – György Almásy, Hungarian travel writer (born 1867)
- September 25
  - Ring Lardner, American writer (born 1885)
  - Pascal Poirier, Canadian historian (born 1852)
- September 28 – G. R. S. Mead, British writer (born 1863)
- October 30 – Herminie Templeton Kavanagh, Anglo-Irish-American short story writer (born 1861?)
- November 12 – F. Holland Day, American publisher (born 1864)
- November 20 – Augustine Birrell, English politician and author (born 1850)
- November 28 – Minnie Earl Sears, American librarian (born 1873)
- November 30 – Annie Armitt, English novelist and poet (born 1850)
- December 4 – Stefan George, German poet and translator (born 1868)
- December 16 – Robert W. Chambers, American writer (born 1865)
- December 27 – Georgina Castle Smith (pseudonym Brenda), English children's writer (born 1845)

== Awards ==
- James Tait Black Memorial Prize for fiction: A. G. Macdonell, England, Their England
- James Tait Black Memorial Prize for biography: Violet Clifton, The Book of Talbot
- Newbery Medal for children's literature: Elizabeth Foreman Lewis, Young Fu of the Upper Yangtze
- Nobel Prize in Literature: Ivan Alekseyevich Bunin
- Pulitzer Prize for Drama: Maxwell Anderson, Both Your Houses
- Pulitzer Prize for Poetry: Archibald MacLeish, Conquistador
- Pulitzer Prize for the Novel: T. S. Stribling, The Store
