= The Man Who Was Too Clever =

1935 novel

- First edition
- Author: Anthony Gilbert
- Language: English
- Series: Scott Egerton
- Genre: Mystery thriller
- Publisher: Collins Crime Club
- Publication date: 1935
- Publication place: United Kingdom
- Media type: Print
- Preceded by: An Old Lady Dies

The Man Who Was Too Clever is a 1935 mystery detective novel by Anthony Gilbert, the pen name of British writer Lucy Beatrice Malleson. It is the tenth and last in a series of novels featuring her amateur detective and politician Scott Egerton. The following year she introduced a new character, the unscrupulous solicitor Arthur Crook, in Murder by Experts.

== Synopsis ==
Helen Paget is found shot dead in a private room of the Apsley Hotel in London. Her murderer has developed a very complex plot to commit the killing without being caught, but he is too clever for his own good.

== Bibliography ==
- Magill, Frank Northen . Critical Survey of Mystery and Detective Fiction: Authors, Volume 2. Salem Press, 1988.
- Murphy, Bruce F. The Encyclopedia of Murder and Mystery. Springer, 1999.
- Reilly, John M. Twentieth Century Crime & Mystery Writers. Springer, 2015.
