= The Tragedy at Freyne =

1927 novel

- First edition (UK)
- Author: Anthony Gilbert
- Language: English
- Series: Scott Egerton
- Genre: Mystery thriller
- Publisher: William Collins, Sons (UK); Dial Press (US)
- Publication date: 1927
- Publication place: United Kingdom
- Media type: Print
- Followed by: The Murder of Mrs. Davenport

The Tragedy at Freyne is a 1927 mystery detective novel by Anthony Gilbert, the pen name of British writer Lucy Beatrice Malleson, her first novel under the pseudonym. It introduced the amateur detective Scott Egerton, who was her principal character until the creation of Arthur Crook in Murder by Experts.

== Synopsis ==
Sir Simon Chandos is found dead in his library with a confession written in front of him and a bottle of morphia tablets by his side, it appears to be an obvious case of suicide. However one of the guests at the country house notices a slight discrepancy and launches his own amateur investigation into the death.

== Bibliography ==
- Magill, Frank Northen . Critical Survey of Mystery and Detective Fiction: Authors, Volume 2. Salem Press, 1988.
- Murphy, Bruce F. The Encyclopedia of Murder and Mystery. Springer, 1999.
- Reilly, John M. Twentieth Century Crime & Mystery Writers. Springer, 2015.
