= Dead of Winter (1987 film) =

1987 film by Arthur Penn

- Theatrical release poster
- Directed by: Arthur Penn
- Written by: Marc Shmuger; Mark Malone
- Based on: The Woman in Red (1941 novel) by Anthony Gilbert
- Produced by: John Bloomgarden; Marc Shmuger
- Starring: Mary Steenburgen; Roddy McDowall; Jan Rubes; William Russ
- Cinematography: Jan Weincke
- Edited by: Rick Shaine
- Music by: Richard Einhorn
- Production company: Metro-Goldwyn-Mayer
- Distributed by: MGM Entertainment Co.
- Release dates: January 1987 (Avoriaz); February 6, 1987 (U.S.)
- Running time: 101 minutes
- Country: United States
- Language: English
- Box office: $2.4 million (USA)

Dead of Winter is a 1987 American psychological thriller film directed by Arthur Penn and starring Mary Steenburgen, who plays three roles, along with Roddy McDowall and Jan Rubeš. It is an uncredited adaptation of the 1941 novel The Woman in Red by Anthony Gilbert, which had previously been the basis of the 1945 film My Name Is Julia Ross. It was released by MGM Entertainment Co. on February 6, 1987.

== Plot ==
On New Year's Eve, Julie Rose retrieves a satchel full of cash from a train station's locker and drives into an empty parking lot. Once there, she calls someone and says on the phone that she will wait only a few more minutes. After she gets back in her car, a man in the backseat strangles her and removes her left ring finger.

In New York City, struggling actress Katie McGovern, who looks astonishingly like Julie Rose, lives in a cramped apartment with her out-of-work husband, Rob Sweeney. Katie has been auditioning for roles and looks forward to a new one in a movie. At the audition, she is interviewed by the meek and neurotic Mr. Murray, who hires her immediately. The pair drive upstate into a snowstorm. During the drive, they pass through covered bridges and stop at a gas station, where the attendant provides them a gift of goldfish with their purchase. Katie and Murray arrive at the secluded mansion of steely Dr. Joseph Lewis, the film producer, who uses a wheelchair. He is very strong, though, was once a big-game hunter, and currently lifts weights. Katie asks to use the phone to call Rob, but finds it has no dial tone. Dr. Lewis surmises the storm must have downed the lines.

Dr. Lewis explains that Katie has been hired to replace Julie Rose, an actress who had a nervous breakdown during a film shoot. She was picked due to her remarkable physical resemblance, as the plan is to still use the footage shot with Julie with new film of Katie. The following day, Mr. Murray cuts and dyes Katie's hair to match the photos of Julie.

The next day, they film a movie scene, though Dr. Lewis clearly doesn't know the basics of film-making: Katie must ask him in which direction she should look, and then has to prompt him to say "Action." She is pleased, as she reads through the dialogue, that the movie seems to be a thriller.

Still wanting to phone Rob, then discovering the kitchen phone line has been cut, Katie finds a notebook with Polaroids of Julie's corpse. Horrified, she confronts Dr. Lewis, who explains that Julie's breakdown ended with her suicide. In the parlour, Katie sees her driver's license burning in the fireplace. Unable to retrieve it, she rushes to her room and finds all her ID is missing from her wallet. Katie flees the house without a coat, but the weather is ferocious. She ends up crawling to the top of a hill and, to her horror, bumps into Mr. Murray. Back at the house, Dr. Lewis scolds her, saying that her imagination is running wild. Katie realizes that Mr. Murray has drugged her hot chocolate. In her room, she barricades the door with furniture before she passes out.

That same night, the videotape of the "thriller" footage is dropped off at a woman's house. She watches the tape, which shows Katie (as Julie Rose) delivering dialogue about being assaulted and knocked out, and saying that "there was blood everywhere." The tape has, as a coda, footage of Dr. Lewis, telling her that Julie Rose did not die, and that the video is the proof. He expects to meet with her.

As she sleeps, Mr. Murray enters her room through a secret door behind a mirror. Katie wakes up with a bandaged hand, then finds he has amputated her left ring finger and screams in horror. Since her barricade is undisturbed, Katie finds the secret door to the attic, which has a working phone. She calls Rob and tells him in terrified whispers that they are going to kill her. Rob asks where she is, and Katie whispers about the covered bridges and the goldfish. She calls the police and begs them to hurry to Dr. Lewis's house. Mr. Murray finds her and hangs up the phone before she can finish talking. He returns her to her room, where she collapses on the bed, only to find Julie Rose's corpse beside her. Katie's shock and horror are reaching fever pitch, from determination to escape (at one end of a spectrum) to a state of near mental collapse.

As Dr. Lewis re-bandages her finger, he explains that Julie was involved in a vicious family feud with her sister, Evelyn (the woman who watched the tape). As a radical therapy, Dr. Lewis convinced her to blackmail her sister, theorizing that it would help her achieve a catharsis. Being pleased with Julie's progress, he did not expect Evelyn to kill her. Evelyn had hired a hit man with instructions to take Julie's finger as proof of the job. Hence, as a new ploy in Lewis's financial maneuverings and to keep up the masquerade that Julie is still alive, Mr. Murray has cut Katie's finger off, too.

During his explanation, the police arrive. Katie stumbles desperately downstairs, still confused from the sedative, to tell the officers she has been kidnapped and maimed. Dr. Lewis speaks over her, claiming that she is his patient, so deranged that she has cut off her own finger. The policemen leave without much of an investigation. Meanwhile, Rob and Katie's brother Roland drive upstate, using the handful of clues they have to try to locate Katie.

Evelyn, a sarcastic and contemptuous woman, then arrives at the house. Dr. Lewis offers Katie as proof that Julie is still alive, to continue the blackmail. Katie fakes an escape attempt, luring Dr. Lewis and Mr. Murray out of the house. She pleads with Evelyn to help her escape, but Evelyn is convinced that she is really Julie and attacks her. Katie kills Evelyn in self-defense, hides her body and, when the two men return to the house, she poses as Evelyn (imitating her contemptuous tone) in the hope that she can still escape.

Mr. Murray realizes the ruse, but Katie fatally stabs him in the neck. Rob and Roland reach the town and speak to the police. When they reveal that she had told them by phone that her finger was amputated, the police hurriedly agree to revisit the house. Dr. Lewis, looking for Mr. Murray, realizes that Katie has fooled him and, in a startling display of strength, stands from his wheelchair and hauls himself up the stairs after her. Katie hides in the attic. Lewis makes his way over to her hiding-place in a corner, only to have his leg crushed in his own bear trap, which she has laid prepared for him. To her shock, his body rises again, but it is only Rob and Roland, with the police, lifting the attic trapdoor. They gently help a profoundly traumatized Katie out of the house.

== Cast ==
- Mary Steenburgen as Katie McGovern / Julie Rose / Evelyn
- Roddy McDowall as Mr. Murray
- Jan Rubeš as Dr. Joseph Lewis
- William Russ as Rob Sweeney
- Ken Pogue as Officer Mullavy
- Wayne Robson as Officer Huntley
- Mark Malone as Roland McGovern
- Dwayne McLean as Killer

== Production ==
The film was originally set to be directed by screenwriter Marc Shmuger, a classmate and friend of Arthur Penn's son Matthew. Penn was attached as an executive producer. A few days into production, Shumager found himself in over his head Producer John Bloomgarden took over directing in the interim. Studio executive Alan Ladd, Jr. convinced Penn to take over directing.

Exteriors were filmed in location in Toronto and Beaverton, Ontario, Canada. Much of the film was shot at Lake Shore Studios in Toronto, where the interior of the mansion was built across several soundstages.

== Release ==
=== Home media ===
MGM Home Entertainment released the film on VHS and DVD on December 3, 2002. The film debuted on Blu-ray on January 10, 2017. The disc was released by Shout Factory under their spin-off label Scream Factory. Aside from the restoration, the disc has one new special feature, an interview with lead actress Mary Steenburgen. The disc has since gone out of print.

== Reception ==
=== Critical response ===
Dead of Winter has a 77% Fresh rating on Rotten Tomatoes from 13 reviews. In Janet Maslin's review for The New York Times, she wrote, "When a director approaches Gothic horror with this much enthusiasm, the results are bound to be as merry as they are frightening. So audiences for Arthur Penn's Dead of Winter are in for a hair-raising treat." Roger Ebert gave the film two and a half out of four, and concluded that, "The movie itself is finally just an exercise in silliness – great effort to little avail – but the actors have fun with it, the sets work and there are one or two moments with perfect surprises."

Writing for The Washington Post, Paul Attanasio stated that Steenburgen "manages with élan an assignment that has her playing three parts". He faulted the lengthy build-up to the final confrontation, specifying, "An hour's worth of exposition is a long wait, and if the payoff isn't quite worth it, it is fun. After nine yards of soggy oatmeal, you're reintroduced to the pleasures of an old-fashioned haunted house." The staff review of the film in Variety found Rubeš to be lacking as the villain, writing, "Steenburgen and McDowall are the adversaries to follow, even though it would seem more likely that the wheel-chair bound doctor (Jan Rubeš) should be the one to watch. Rubeš is simply not sinister enough to be the mastermind behind this scheme."
