= The Night of the Fog =

1930 novel

- First US edition
- Author: Anthony Gilbert
- Language: English
- Series: Scott Egerton
- Genre: Mystery thriller
- Publisher: Gollancz (UK); Dodd, Mead & Co. (US)
- Publication date: 1930
- Publication place: United Kingdom
- Media type: Print
- Preceded by: The Mystery of the Open Window
- Followed by: The Body on the Beam

The Night of the Fog is a 1930 mystery detective novel by Anthony Gilbert, the pen name of British writer Lucy Beatrice Malleson. It is the fifth of ten novels in a series featuring her amateur detective and politician Scott Egerton, a precursor to her better known creation Arthur Crook.

== Synopsis ==
Egerton joins forces with an ex-secret service agent to assist the wealthy Jasper Hilton who has been threatened by a serious of anonymous letters. Shortly after they have appeared to solve the case, however, Hilton is murdered.

== Bibliography ==
- Magill, Frank Northen . Critical Survey of Mystery and Detective Fiction: Authors, Volume 2. Salem Press, 1988.
- Murphy, Bruce F. The Encyclopedia of Murder and Mystery. Springer, 1999.
- Reilly, John M. Twentieth Century Crime & Mystery Writers. Springer, 2015.
