= The Mystery of the Open Window =

1929 novel

- First US edition
- Author: Anthony Gilbert
- Language: English
- Series: Scott Egerton
- Genre: Mystery thriller
- Publisher: Gollancz; Dodd, Mead (US)
- Publication date: 1929
- Publication place: United Kingdom
- Media type: Print
- Preceded by: Death at Four Corners
- Followed by: The Night of the Fog

The Mystery of the Open Window is a 1929 mystery detective novel by Anthony Gilbert, the pen name of British writer Lucy Beatrice Malleson. It is the fourth novel in a series featuring her amateur detective, the politician Scott Egerton. Unlike the rest of the series it was published by Gollancz rather than Collins. It takes the form of a locked room mystery, a popular branch of the genre during the Golden Age of Detective Fiction.

== Synopsis ==
By coincidence, Egerton is at a disreputable inn in Paris when the proprietor is visited by the wealthy Sir Henry Archer, owner of the famous Archer Library, carrying several valuable books with him. Obviously in a state of terror, he demands that his room be locked and his window barred. Nonetheless the following morning he is found in bed, stabbed to death.

== Bibliography ==
- Magill, Frank Northen . Critical Survey of Mystery and Detective Fiction: Authors, Volume 2. Salem Press, 1988.
- Murphy, Bruce F. The Encyclopedia of Murder and Mystery. Springer, 1999.
- Reilly, John M. Twentieth Century Crime & Mystery Writers. Springer, 2015.
