= The Long Shadow (Gilbert novel) =

1932 novel

- First edition
- Author: Anthony Gilbert
- Language: English
- Series: Scott Egerton
- Genre: Mystery thriller
- Publisher: Collins Crime Club
- Publication date: 1932
- Publication place: United Kingdom
- Media type: Print
- Preceded by: The Body on the Beam
- Followed by: The Musical Comedy Crime

The Long Shadow is a 1932 mystery detective novel by Anthony Gilbert, the pen name of British writer Lucy Beatrice Malleson. It is the seventh of ten novels in a series featuring her amateur detective and politician Scott Egerton, a precursor to her better known creation Arthur Crook.

== Synopsis ==
Mademoiselle Robert had twenty five years earlier been a celebrated star on the Parisian stage before drifting in anonymity. Now she has been founded dead in a slum-like tenement in London, with a knife through her heart.

== Bibliography ==
- Magill, Frank Northen . Critical Survey of Mystery and Detective Fiction: Authors, Volume 2. Salem Press, 1988.
- Murphy, Bruce F. The Encyclopedia of Murder and Mystery. Springer, 1999.
- Reilly, John M. Twentieth Century Crime & Mystery Writers. Springer, 2015.
