= Death in the Wrong Room =

1947 novel

- First edition
- Author: Anthony Gilbert
- Language: English
- Series: Arthur Crook
- Genre: Mystery thriller
- Publisher: Collins Crime Club (UK); A.S. Barnes (US)
- Publication date: 1947
- Publication place: United Kingdom
- Media type: Print
- Preceded by: The Spinster's Secret
- Followed by: Die in the Dark

Death in the Wrong Room is a 1947 mystery thriller novel by Anthony Gilbert, the pen name of British writer Lucy Beatrice Malleson. It is the nineteenth in her long-running series featuring the unscrupulous London solicitor Arthur Crook, one of the more unorthodox detectives of the Golden Age.

== Synopsis ==
Shortly after the Second World War the domineering Lady Bute comes to live as a paying guest at the home built by Colonel Anstruther and now run by his daughter. Her murder threatens to unravel secrets best kept buried.

== Bibliography ==
- Magill, Frank Northen . Critical Survey of Mystery and Detective Fiction: Authors, Volume 2. Salem Press, 1988.
- Murphy, Bruce F. The Encyclopedia of Murder and Mystery. Springer, 1999.
- Reilly, John M. Twentieth Century Crime & Mystery Writers. Springer, 2015.
