= Death at Four Corners =

1929 novel

- First edition UK
- Author: Anthony Gilbert
- Language: English
- Series: Scott Egerton
- Genre: Mystery thriller
- Publisher: William Collins, Sons (UK); Dial Press (US)
- Publication date: 1929
- Publication place: United Kingdom
- Media type: Print
- Preceded by: The Murder of Mrs. Davenport
- Followed by: The Mystery of the Open Window

Death at Four Corners is a 1929 mystery detective novel by Anthony Gilbert, the pen name of British writer Lucy Beatrice Malleson. It is the third novel in a series featuring her amateur detective Scott Egerton.

== Synopsis ==
A man in clerical clothing is found shot dead near Fourt Corner, the seaside country estate of Sir Gervase Blount who immediately comes under suspicion of murder. In particular Blount appears to have been protecting his wife who has been blackmailed by the dead man. The answer is methodically worked out by the detective.

== Bibliography ==
- Fielding, Steven . A State of Play: British Politics on Screen, Stage and Page, from Anthony Trollope to The Thick of It. A&C Black, 2014.
- Magill, Frank Northen . Critical Survey of Mystery and Detective Fiction: Authors, Volume 2. Salem Press, 1988.
- Murphy, Bruce F. The Encyclopedia of Murder and Mystery. Springer, 1999.
- Reilly, John M. Twentieth Century Crime & Mystery Writers. Springer, 2015.
