= The Murder of Mrs. Davenport =

1928 novel

- First edition (UK)
- Author: Anthony Gilbert
- Language: English
- Series: Scott Egerton
- Genre: Mystery thriller
- Publisher: William Collins, Sons (UK); Dial Press (US)
- Publication date: 1928
- Publication place: United Kingdom
- Media type: Print
- Preceded by: The Tragedy at Freyne
- Followed by: Death at Four Corners

The Murder of Mrs. Davenport is a 1928 mystery detective novel by Anthony Gilbert, the pen name of British writer Lucy Beatrice Malleson. It was the second novel featuring her amateur detective Scott Egerton.

== Synopsis ==
Shortly before his marriage to a wealthy woman, Sir Denis Brinsley is confronted with a figure from his past. Helen Davenport arrives and offers to sell him damaging letters between them that will likely destroy his coming marriage. Shortly after he refuses, she is discovered strangled.

== Bibliography ==
- Fielding, Steven . A State of Play: British Politics on Screen, Stage and Page, from Anthony Trollope to The Thick of It. A&C Black, 2014.
- Magill, Frank Northen . Critical Survey of Mystery and Detective Fiction: Authors, Volume 2. Salem Press, 1988.
- Murphy, Bruce F. The Encyclopedia of Murder and Mystery. Springer, 1999.
- Reilly, John M. Twentieth Century Crime & Mystery Writers. Springer, 2015.
