= Portrait of a Murderer =

Portrait of a Murderer may refer to:

- Portrait of a Murderer (novel), a 1933 novel by Anne Meredith
- "Portrait of a Murderer" (Playhouse 90), a 1958 television play in the series Playhouse 90
