= The Body on the Beam =

1932 novel

- First edition (UK)
- Author: Anthony Gilbert
- Language: English
- Series: Scott Egerton
- Genre: Mystery thriller
- Publisher: Collins Crime Club (UK); Dodd Mead (US)
- Publication date: 1932
- Publication place: United Kingdom
- Media type: Print
- Preceded by: The Night of the Fog
- Followed by: The Long Shadow

The Body on the Beam is a 1932 mystery detective novel by Anthony Gilbert, the pen name of British writer Lucy Beatrice Malleson. It is the sixth of ten novels in a series featuring her amateur detective and politician Scott Egerton, a precursor to her better known creation Arthur Crook.

== Synopsis ==
Florence Penny, one of the lodgers at 39 Menzies Street, a rundown London boarding house, is discovered in her room one morning hanging from a beam. At first considered a tragic suicide, Inspector Field's enquiries begin to throw an air of mystery over the case. When he makes an arrest for murder, it is the wrong man. Fortunately Scott Egerton is on hand to solve the case.

== Bibliography ==
- Magill, Frank Northen . Critical Survey of Mystery and Detective Fiction: Authors, Volume 2. Salem Press, 1988.
- Murphy, Bruce F. The Encyclopedia of Murder and Mystery. Springer, 1999.
- Reilly, John M. Twentieth Century Crime & Mystery Writers. Springer, 2015.
