= An Old Lady Dies =

1934 novel

- First edition
- Author: Anthony Gilbert
- Language: English
- Series: Scott Egerton
- Genre: Mystery thriller
- Publisher: Collins Crime Club
- Publication date: 1934
- Publication place: United Kingdom
- Media type: Print
- Preceded by: The Musical Comedy Crime
- Followed by: The Man Who Was Too Clever

An Old Lady Dies is a 1934 mystery detective novel by Anthony Gilbert, the pen name of British writer Lucy Beatrice Malleson. It is the ninth of ten novels in a series featuring her amateur detective and politician Scott Egerton, a precursor to her better known creation Arthur Crook. It was reviewed in the Sunday Times by Dorothy L. Sayers.

== Synopsis ==
A wealthy old lady enjoys keeping her impecunious relatives on tenterhooks about her will, enjoying the power she wields over them. When she dies from an overdose of morphine her niece is arrested by the police.

== Bibliography ==
- Magill, Frank Northen . Critical Survey of Mystery and Detective Fiction: Authors, Volume 2. Salem Press, 1988.
- Murphy, Bruce F. The Encyclopedia of Murder and Mystery. Springer, 1999.
- Reilly, John M. Twentieth Century Crime & Mystery Writers. Springer, 2015.
