= The Woman in Red (novel) =

1941 novel

- First Edition (US)
- Author: Anthony Gilbert
- Language: English
- Series: Arthur Crook
- Genre: Mystery thriller
- Publisher: Collins Crime Club (UK); Smith and Durrell (US)
- Publication date: 1941
- Publication place: United Kingdom
- Media type: Print
- Preceded by: The Vanishing Corpse
- Followed by: Something Nasty in the Woodshed

The Woman in Red is a 1941 mystery thriller novel by Anthony Gilbert, the pen name of British writer Lucy Beatrice Malleson. It is the ninth in her series featuring the London solicitor Arthur Crook, one of the more unscrupulous characters of the Golden Age of Detective Fiction. It was first published by the Collins Crime Club.

== Synopsis ==
During early 1940 twenty three year old Julia Ross is unemployed and without money living in a cheap boarding house. She is also recovering from being spurned by her lover. Desperate she accepts an unpromising job as a secretary to an odd red-clad lady she meets in a gloomy house in Mayfair, attended by sinister servants. Asked as a condition of the job that she has no ties, the long-orphaned Julia says she has not. In fact this is not entirely true, as she has befriended a young man Colin who she has met in Lyons Tea Shop. Although he has told her of a fiancee in Ireland.

Once in the house, Julia objects to her employer's plan to leave London immediately and finds herself held as a virtual prisoner. She is drugged and her plans to leave early in the morning are foiled. Despite being told that they are heading to Bournemouth by train, they instead begin a long drive down the Great West Road into the countryside. Taken to a lonely and secluded house, the few locals she comes into contact with are told that she is the old lady's niece, an unbalanced, suicidal woman named Sheila Campbell. With dread Julia begins to believe that they plan to kill her having established that she is not mentally responsible.

Behind her the trail is covered, at her boarding house a dishonest maid has pocketed the money she has left to settle her bills and destroyed the letter with it. Colin, who has developed feelings for Julia, is the only one who notices her absence. Fortunately he turns to Arthur Crook, who drops his other cases to pursue the few clues they have. Before long he suspects this is a case not just of kidnapping but also espionage and likely murder.

== Film adaptations ==
In 1945, it was adapted into the 1945 American film My Name Is Julia Ross directed by Joseph H. Lewis and starring Nina Foch and Dame May Whitty. Produced by Columbia Pictures, it made a number of alterations from the original novel including the dropping of Arthur Crook from the story entirely.

In 1987, Arthur Penn directed Dead of Winter, a loose remake of My Name Is Julia Ross that stars Mary Steenburgen.

== Bibliography ==
- Goble, Alan. The Complete Index to Literary Sources in Film. Walter de Gruyter, 1999.
- Magill, Frank Northen . Critical Survey of Mystery and Detective Fiction: Authors, Volume 2. Salem Press, 1988.
- Murphy, Bruce F. The Encyclopedia of Murder and Mystery. Springer, 1999.
- Reilly, John M. Twentieth Century Crime & Mystery Writers. Springer, 2015.
