= Candles at Nine =

1944 British film by John Harlow

- Opening title
- Directed by: John Harlow
- Screenplay by: Basil Mason; John Harlow
- Based on: novel The Mouse Who Wouldn't Play Ball by Anthony Gilbert
- Produced by: Wallace Orton
- Starring: Jessie Matthews; John Stuart; Beatrix Lehmann
- Cinematography: James Wilson
- Edited by: Vi Burdon (uncredited)
- Music by: score composed & directed by: Charles Williams
- Production company: British National Films
- Distributed by: Anglo-American Film Corporation (UK)
- Release date: 1944
- Running time: 82 minutes
- Country: United Kingdom
- Language: English

Candles at Nine (also known as The Mouse) is a 1944 British mystery film directed by John Harlow and starring Jessie Matthews, John Stuart and Beatrix Lehmann. It was written by Basil Mason and Harlow based on the 1943 novel The Mouse Who Wouldn't Play Ball by Anthony Gilbert.

A wealthy man taunts his relations and staff about which of them shall inherit his estate after he changes his Will; the same night, he falls down the stairs. His money is left to a distant female relative; a target for intrigue, from some, and murder, from another.

== Plot ==
After the mysterious death of wealthy old Everard Hope, his avaricious relatives are little pleased to discover that his estate has been left to distant relation Dorothea Capper, a young showgirl. The one condition of the will is that she must stay in Hope's spooky mansion for a month. After several attempts on Dorothea's life, detective William Gardener decides to investigate.

== Cast ==
- Eliot Makeham as Everard Hope
- Beatrix Lehmann as Julia Carberry
- John Salew as Griggs, the butler
- Joss Ambler as Garth Hope
- Vera Bogetti as Lucille Hope
- Andre Van Gyseghem as Cecil Tempest
- Winifred Shotter as Brenda Tempest
- Reginald Purdell as Charles Lacey
- Hugh Dempster as Hugh Lacey
- Jessie Matthews as Dorothea Capper
- John Stuart as William Gordon
- Ernest Butcher as Everard's gardener
- C. Denier Warren as Middleton, the solicitor
- Patricia Hayes as Gewndolyn, the day maid

== Critical reception ==
The Monthly Film Bulletin wrote: "Neither in direction nor acting nor script is it convincing. Jessie Matthews is reasonable while she is on the stage, but poor as an emotional actress. Beatrix Lehmann with the help of the cameraman makes a better effort to portray a really sinister figure of the housekeeper. Reginald Purdell and Hugh Dempster as the two comics are pulled in by their heels, so to speak. In short, it is a disappointing film."

The Daily Film Renter wrote: "It presents a hotchpot of would-be creepiness and crude humour which hardly adds up to either drama or comedy. Film switches to and fro between unconvincing villainy and weak wisecracks that don't come off. Jessie Matthews in the star part may still attract old admirers, but the production as a whole can only be recommended to easily-pleased and uncritical patrons."

TV Guide dismissed the film as a "tedious mystery".
