= Lady Killer (novel) =

1951 novel

- First edition
- Author: Anthony Gilbert
- Language: English
- Series: Arthur Crook
- Genre: Mystery thriller
- Publisher: Collins Crime Club
- Publication date: 1951
- Publication place: United Kingdom
- Media type: Print
- Preceded by: A Nice Cup of Tea
- Followed by: Miss Pinnegar Disappears

Lady Killer is a 1951 mystery thriller novel by Anthony Gilbert, the pen name of British writer Lucy Beatrice Malleson. It is the twenty fifth in her long-running series featuring the unscrupulous London solicitor Arthur Crook, one of the more unorthodox detectives of the Golden Age.

== Synopsis ==
Three women, a young German housekeeper, a tea shop proprietor, and a Colonel's daughter have recently come into some money. All three die tragic deaths shortly after meeting and marrying a tall, distinguished man whose name changes in each case but always keeps the initials H.G. In each case the coroner's investigation concludes that the death is accidental, and fails to draw the link between the similar deaths. With satisfaction the perpetrator believes he has got away with murder. Unknown to him, however, the three cases have caught the eye of London lawyer Arthur Crook.

== Bibliography ==
- Magill, Frank Northen . Critical Survey of Mystery and Detective Fiction: Authors, Volume 2. Salem Press, 1988.
- Murphy, Bruce F. The Encyclopedia of Murder and Mystery. Springer, 1999.
- Reilly, John M. Twentieth Century Crime & Mystery Writers. Springer, 2015.
