= Something Nasty in the Woodshed =

1942 novel by Anthony Gilbert

- First edition
- Author: Anthony Gilbert
- Language: English
- Series: Arthur Crook
- Genre: Mystery thriller
- Publisher: Collins Crime Club (UK); Smith and Durrell (US)
- Publication date: 1942
- Publication place: United Kingdom
- Media type: Print
- Preceded by: The Woman in Red
- Followed by: Death in the Blackout

Something Nasty in the Woodshed is a 1942 mystery detective novel by Anthony Gilbert, the pen name of British writer Lucy Beatrice Malleson. It is the tenth in her long-running series featuring the unscrupulous London solicitor and detective Arthur Crook. In 1942 it was published in America under the alternative title Mystery in the Woodshed.

The novel was adapted by actor Dennis Hoey into a play named The Haven. With Melville Cooper playing the lead role it opened on Broadway in November 1946, but closed after five performances following poor reviews.

== Synopsis ==
Agatha Forbes answers an advertisement through a matrimonial agency from a man seeking a woman of independent means. However once living with her charming new husband at his isolated cottage, he increasingly seems sinister and even Bluebeard-like.

== Bibliography ==
- Lachman, Marvin. The Villainous Stage: Crime Plays on Broadway and in the West End. McFarland, 2014.
- Magill, Frank Northen . Critical Survey of Mystery and Detective Fiction: Authors, Volume 2. Salem Press, 1988.
- Murphy, Bruce F. The Encyclopedia of Murder and Mystery. Springer, 1999.
- Reilly, John M. Twentieth Century Crime & Mystery Writers. Springer, 2015.
