= Snake in the Grass (novel) =

1954 novel

- First edition (UK)
- Author: Anthony Gilbert
- Language: English
- Series: Arthur Crook
- Genre: Mystery thriller
- Publisher: Collins Crime Club (UK); Harper & Brothers (US)
- Publication date: 1954
- Publication place: United Kingdom
- Media type: Print
- Preceded by: Footsteps Behind Me
- Followed by: Is She Dead Too?

Snake in the Grass is a 1954 mystery detective novel by Anthony Gilbert, the pen name of British writer Lucy Beatrice Malleson. It is the twenty-eighth in her long-running series featuring the unscrupulous solicitor and detective Arthur Crook. It was published in the United States under the alternative title Death Won't Wait. Reviewing it in the New York Times Anthony Boucher, described it "one of Gilbert’s duller books", while other reviews were more praiseworthy.

== Synopsis ==
A man is accosted on a London street by an attractive young woman who begs him for the loan of a pound, explaining that she is fleeing from her husband. She promptly disappears, and her husband is found dead. Arthur Crook becomes involved in the case which plays out amidst the black marketeers and bombed-out buildings of the post-war capital.

== Bibliography ==
- Magill, Frank Northen . Critical Survey of Mystery and Detective Fiction: Authors, Volume 2. Salem Press, 1988.
- Murphy, Bruce F. The Encyclopedia of Murder and Mystery. Springer, 1999.
- Reilly, John M. Twentieth Century Crime & Mystery Writers. Springer, 2015.
