= The Scarlet Button =

1944 mystery novel by Anthony Gilbert

- First Edition (US)
- Author: Anthony Gilbert
- Language: English
- Series: Arthur Crook
- Genre: Mystery thriller
- Publisher: Collins Crime Club (UK); Smith and Durrell (US)
- Publication date: 1944
- Publication place: United Kingdom
- Media type: Print
- Preceded by: He Came by Night
- Followed by: Don't Open the Door

The Scarlet Button is a 1944 mystery thriller novel by Anthony Gilbert, the pen name of British writer Lucy Beatrice Malleson. It is the fourteenth in her series featuring the London solicitor Arthur Crook, one of the more unscrupulous detectives of the Golden Age. It was published in the United States, initially under the same name and later with the alternative title Murder is Cheap.

== Synopsis ==
James Chigwell a prolific blackmailer is discovered bludgeoned to death. The murderer may be any one of his large number of victims.

== Bibliography ==
- Magill, Frank Northen . Critical Survey of Mystery and Detective Fiction: Authors, Volume 2. Salem Press, 1988.
- Murphy, Bruce F. The Encyclopedia of Murder and Mystery. Springer, 1999.
- Reilly, John M. Twentieth Century Crime & Mystery Writers. Springer, 2015.
