= The Case Against Andrew Fane =

1931 novel

- First US edition
- Author: Anthony Gilbert
- Language: English
- Genre: Mystery thriller
- Publisher: Collins Crime Club (UK); Dodd Mead (US)
- Publication date: 1931
- Publication place: United Kingdom
- Media type: Print

The Case Against Andrew Fane is a 1931 mystery detective novel by the British writer Anthony Gilbert, the pen name of British writer Lucy Beatrice Malleson. It was a stand-alone novel by the author who was at the best time known for her Golden Age detective Scott Egerton.

== Synopsis ==
Facing five years in prison for fraud unless he can secure money quickly Andrew Fane goes to visit his wealthy, eccentric uncle. However, after encountering a mysterious and heavily veiled woman at his property, he finds him dead. Panicking his actions make him seem the prime suspect to the investigating police who appear to have an open-and-shut case against him.

== Bibliography ==
- Hubin, Allen J. Crime Fiction, 1749-1980: A Comprehensive Bibliography. Garland Publishing, 1984.
- Reilly, John M. Twentieth Century Crime & Mystery Writers. Springer, 2015.
