= Treason in My Breast =

1938 novel

- First edition (UK)
- Author: Anthony Gilbert
- Language: English
- Series: Arthur Crook
- Genre: Mystery thriller
- Publisher: Collins Crime Club
- Publication date: 1938
- Publication place: United Kingdom
- Media type: Print
- Preceded by: Murder Has No Tongue
- Followed by: The Clock in the Hatbox

Treason in My Breast is a 1938 mystery detective novel by Anthony Gilbert, the pen name of British writer Lucy Beatrice Malleson. It is the fourth in her long-running series featuring the unscrupulous London solicitor and detective Arthur Crook. Crook became one of the established characters of the Golden Age of Detective Fiction, although in this case the novel was more similar to a Victorian melodrama than a conventional whodunnit.

== Synopsis ==
From her window, a housewife believes she has witnessed the build-up to a murder of a young woman in the flat opposite. She calls in Arthur Crook to assist her in unravelling what seems to be an ingenious attempt to steal a large inheritance.

== Bibliography ==
- Magill, Frank Northen . Critical Survey of Mystery and Detective Fiction: Authors, Volume 2. Salem Press, 1988.
- Murphy, Bruce F. The Encyclopedia of Murder and Mystery. Springer, 1999.
- Reilly, John M. Twentieth Century Crime & Mystery Writers. Springer, 2015.
