= The Bell of Death =

1939 novel

- First edition (UK)
- Author: Anthony Gilbert
- Language: English
- Series: Arthur Crook
- Genre: Mystery thriller
- Publisher: Collins Crime Club
- Publication date: 1939
- Publication place: United Kingdom
- Media type: Print
- Preceded by: The Clock in the Hatbox
- Followed by: Dear Dead Woman

The Bell of Death is a 1939 mystery detective novel by Anthony Gilbert, the pen name of British writer Lucy Beatrice Malleson. It is the sixth in her long-running series featuring the unscrupulous London lawyer and detective Arthur Crook. It was published during the Golden Age of Detective Fiction. Reviewing it for the Times Literary Supplement, Maurice Percy Ashley commented "as usual with Mr. Gilbert’s stories this is exciting and well written, but it is so complicated that the reader can do little more than hold his breath".

== Synopsis ==
When a vagrant is found dead in the belfry of a London church, suspicion falls on the verger, who has disappeared. Solicitor Arthur Crook promises his wife to clear his name as soon as he is found.

== Bibliography ==
- Cooper, John & Pike, B.A. Artists in Crime: An Illustrated Survey of Crime Fiction First Edition Dustwrappers, 1920-1970. Scolar Press, 1995.
- Magill, Frank Northen . Critical Survey of Mystery and Detective Fiction: Authors, Volume 2. Salem Press, 1988.
- Murphy, Bruce F. The Encyclopedia of Murder and Mystery. Springer, 1999.
- Reilly, John M. Twentieth Century Crime & Mystery Writers. Springer, 2015.
