= Death Knocks Three Times =

1949 novel

- First edition
- Author: Anthony Gilbert
- Language: English
- Series: Arthur Crook
- Genre: Mystery thriller
- Publisher: Collins Crime Club (UK); Random House (US)
- Publication date: 1949
- Publication place: United Kingdom
- Media type: Print
- Preceded by: Lift Up the Lid
- Followed by: Murder Comes Home

Death Knocks Three Times is a 1949 mystery thriller novel by Anthony Gilbert, the pen name of British writer Lucy Beatrice Malleson. It is the twenty second in her long-running series featuring the unscrupulous London solicitor Arthur Crook, one of the more unorthodox detectives of the Golden Age.

== Synopsis ==
While travelling back to London during a storm, Crook is forced to take shelter at the house of the eccentric Colonel Sherren in Chipping Magna. Soon afterwards he is called back to give evidence at the inquest following the old man's death in his bathtub. His suspicions are aroused when he discovers he was not the only member of the family to die recently.

== Bibliography ==
- Magill, Frank Northen . Critical Survey of Mystery and Detective Fiction: Authors, Volume 2. Salem Press, 1988.
- Murphy, Bruce F. The Encyclopedia of Murder and Mystery. Springer, 1999.
- Reilly, John M. Twentieth Century Crime & Mystery Writers. Springer, 2015.
