= Dear Dead Woman =

1940 novel

- First edition (UK)
- Author: Anthony Gilbert
- Language: English
- Series: Arthur Crook
- Genre: Mystery thriller
- Publisher: Collins Crime Club; Arcadia Press (US)
- Publication date: 1940
- Publication place: United Kingdom
- Media type: Print
- Preceded by: The Bell of Death
- Followed by: The Vanishing Corpse

Dear Dead Woman is a 1940 mystery detective novel by Anthony Gilbert, the pen name of British writer Lucy Beatrice Malleson. It is the seventh in her long-running series featuring the unscrupulous London solicitor and detective Arthur Crook. In 1942 it was published in America under the alternative title Death Takes a Redhead.

== Synopsis ==
Beatrice Barton disappears after announcing she is leaving her husband Jack. It is long believed she died in a shipwreck while eloping with her lover. In fact her murdered body lies hidden in the cellar. Seven years later, police search the house of the now remarried Jack Barton and find his first wife's corpse. Arthur Crook is called in to handle Barton's defence following his arrest.

== Bibliography ==
- Magill, Frank Northen . Critical Survey of Mystery and Detective Fiction: Authors, Volume 2. Salem Press, 1988.
- Murphy, Bruce F. The Encyclopedia of Murder and Mystery. Springer, 1999.
- Reilly, John M. Twentieth Century Crime & Mystery Writers. Springer, 2015.
