= Murder Has No Tongue =

1937 novel

- First edition (UK)
- Author: Anthony Gilbert
- Language: English
- Series: Arthur Crook
- Genre: Mystery thriller
- Publisher: Collins Crime Club
- Publication date: 1937
- Publication place: United Kingdom
- Media type: Print
- Preceded by: The Man Who Wasn't There
- Followed by: Treason in My Breast

Murder Has No Tongue is a 1937 mystery detective novel by Anthony Gilbert, the pen name of British writer Lucy Beatrice Malleson. It is the third in her long-running series featuring the unscrupulous London solicitor and detective Arthur Crook.

== Synopsis ==
Flora Horsley, the wealthy wife of a Labour member of parliament is warned by a fortune teller that she will die if she does not leave her husband. She suspects her husband of having an affair, and fears he may attempt to murder her. When she dies within twenty-four hours, suspicion inevitably falls in her husband it is left to Arthur Crook to extricate him from a charge of murder.

== Bibliography ==
- Magill, Frank Northen . Critical Survey of Mystery and Detective Fiction: Authors, Volume 2. Salem Press, 1988.
- Murphy, Bruce F. The Encyclopedia of Murder and Mystery. Springer, 1999.
- Reilly, John M. Twentieth Century Crime & Mystery Writers. Springer, 2015.
