= The Mouse Who Wouldn't Play Ball =

1943 novel

- First edition
- Author: Anthony Gilbert
- Language: English
- Series: Arthur Crook
- Genre: Mystery thriller
- Publisher: Collins Crime Club
- Publication date: 1943
- Publication place: United Kingdom
- Media type: Print
- Preceded by: The Case of the Tea Cosy's Aunt
- Followed by: He Came by Night

The Mouse Who Wouldn't Play Ball is a 1943 mystery thriller novel by the British writer Anthony Gilbert, the pen name of Lucy Beatrice Malleson. It was the twelfth in a long-running series featuring her unscrupulous London lawyer Arthur Crook. It was released in the United States the following year under the alternative title of Thirty Days to Live.

== Synopsis ==
At a country house a miserly but wealthy old man falls down the stairs and dies. When his will is examined his greedily expectant relatives are shocked to discover they won't receive any money at all, as the entire estate passes to Dorothea Capper, a woman they've never heard of. However to secure her inheritance she must spend thirty days in the house, despite a clear threat to her life. To help her she calls in Arthur Crook.

== Film adaptation ==
In 1944 it was made into a film Candles at Nine directed by John Harlow and starring Jessie Matthews, John Stuart and Beatrix Lehmann.

== Bibliography ==
- Goble, Alan. The Complete Index to Literary Sources in Film. Walter de Gruyter, 1999.
- Reilly, John M. Twentieth Century Crime & Mystery Writers. Springer, 2015.
