= The Man Who Wasn't There (Gilbert novel) =

1937 novel

- First edition (UK)
- Author: Anthony Gilbert
- Language: English
- Series: Arthur Crook
- Genre: Mystery thriller
- Publisher: Collins Crime Club
- Publication date: 1937
- Publication place: United Kingdom
- Media type: Print
- Preceded by: Murder by Experts
- Followed by: Murder Has No Tongue

The Man Who Wasn't There is a 1937 mystery detective novel by Anthony Gilbert, the pen name of British writer Lucy Beatrice Malleson. It is the second in her long-running series featuring the unscrupulous London solicitor and detective Arthur Crook.

== Synopsis ==
Marjorie Hyde, a beautiful actress, stands accused of murdering her very jealous husband Major Hyde by poisoning his glass of port after dinner. However Arthur Crook and his associates set out to clear her name.

== Bibliography ==
- Magill, Frank Northen . Critical Survey of Mystery and Detective Fiction: Authors, Volume 2. Salem Press, 1988.
- Murphy, Bruce F. The Encyclopedia of Murder and Mystery. Springer, 1999.
- Reilly, John M. Twentieth Century Crime & Mystery Writers. Springer, 2015.
