= My Name Is Julia Ross =

1945 film by Joseph H. Lewis

- Theatrical release poster
- Directed by: Joseph H. Lewis
- Screenplay by: Muriel Roy Bolton
- Based on: The Woman in Red; 1941 novel by Anthony Gilbert
- Produced by: Wallace MacDonald
- Starring: Nina Foch; Dame May Whitty; George Macready; Roland Varno
- Cinematography: Burnett Guffey
- Edited by: Henry Batista
- Music by: Mischa Bakaleinikoff
- Production company: Columbia Pictures
- Distributed by: Columbia Pictures
- Release date: November 9, 1945
- Running time: 64 minutes
- Country: United States
- Language: English

My Name Is Julia Ross is a 1945 American film noir thriller directed by Joseph H. Lewis, and starring Nina Foch, Dame May Whitty, and George Macready. Its plot follows a young woman in England who is hired as a live-in secretary for an ailing widow, where she awakens one day and is gaslighted by those around her, claiming she is someone else. The screenplay is based on the 1941 novel The Woman in Red by Anthony Gilbert. The film received a loose remake called Dead of Winter (1987), starring Mary Steenburgen.

== Plot ==
In London, Julia Ross goes to a new employment agency, desperate for work. When Mrs. Sparkes learns that she has no near relations, she recommends Julia for a job as a live-in personal secretary to a wealthy widow, Mrs. Hughes. Mrs. Hughes approves and insists that she move that very night into her house. Two days later, Julia awakes as a prisoner at an isolated seaside estate in Cornwall.

All her possessions have disappeared and the young woman is told she is really Marion, the wife of Ralph Hughes, Mrs. Hughes's son. The staff have been told that she has suffered a nervous breakdown; as a result, they ignore her seemingly wild claims, and her attempts to escape are all foiled.

Julia writes a letter to Dennis Bruce, her only close friend and admirer, and cleverly leaves it where it can be found. The Hugheses substitute a blank sheet of paper and allow her to post it, unaware that Julia has anticipated them and written a second letter. That night, Julia discovers a secret passage to her room and overhears Ralph admit to his mother that he murdered his wife in a fit of rage and disposed of her body in the sea. Even so, when a "doctor" comes in response to a fake poisoning attempt, she blurts out her plan to him, only to discover that he (along with Mrs. Sparkes) is in on the scheme. He is dispatched to London to intercept the letter. When the real doctor shows up, Julia thinks he's also a fake and refuses to see him. The doctor recommends she be taken to a hospital immediately, but Mrs. Hughes persuades him to come back in the morning.

Julia's captors have to make it appear that she has committed suicide before the doctor can take her away.

Julia throws her gown out the window, making it look like she threw herself to her death, then hides in the secret passage. When the doctor drives up, Mrs. Hughes delays him so that her son can get to the body first. Ralph picks up a rock to ensure that Julia is really dead, but is stopped by Dennis and a policeman, who had been alerted by the letter. (The fake doctor had been apprehended in London when he tried to intercept the letter.) When Ralph tries to flee, he is shot down. Later, Julia and Dennis drive away and talk about getting married.

== Cast ==
- Nina Foch as Julia Ross
- Dame May Whitty as Mrs. Hughes
- George Macready as Ralph Hughes
- Roland Varno as Dennis Bruce
- Anita Sharp-Bolster as Sparkes
- Doris Lloyd as Mrs. Mackie
- Joy Harington as Bertha
- Queenie Leonard as Alice
- Olaf Hytten as The Reverend Lewis
- Leonard Mudie as Peters
- Harry Hays Morgan Jr. as Robinson
- Ottola Nesmith as Mrs. Robinson
- Reginald Sheffield as McQuarrie
- Evan Thomas as Dr. Keller
- Leyland Hodgson as Policeman
- Milton Owen as Policeman
- Charles McNaughton as Gatekeeper
- Marilyn Johnson as Nurse

== Release ==
My Name Is Julia Ross premiered in New York City on November 9, 1945. Its release expanded in the United States on November 27, 1945.

=== Critical response ===
Film critic Bosley Crowther wrote a mixed review: "The director and scenarist of the Ambassador's new mystery, My Name Is Julia Ross, deserve a B-plus for effort at least. It is quite evident that they strived earnestly to whip up excitement and suspense, but somehow that electrifying quality which distinguishes good melodrama is lacking in this transcription of the Anthony Gilbert novel, The Woman in Red ... While Joseph Lewis, the director, succeeds in creating an effectively ominous atmosphere, he has not been as adept in handling the players, and that, we suspect, is why My Name Is Julia Ross misses the mark.

In The Nation in 1945, critic James Agee wrote, " ... a mouse-among-cats thriller ... The film is well planned, mostly well played, well directed, and in a somewhat boom-happy way well photographed—all around, a likable, unpretentious, generally successful attempt to turn good trash into decently artful entertainment."

The staff at Variety magazine praised the production, writing "Mystery melodrama with a psychological twist runs only 64 minutes but it's fast and packed with tense action throughout. Acting and production (though apparently modestly budgeted) are excellent."

=== Home media ===
Turner Classic Movies released My Name Is Julia Ross on DVD in conjunction with Sony Pictures Home Entertainment and The Film Foundation as part of the five-film set, "Columbia Film Noir Classics III", alongside the films The Mob, Drive a Crooked Road, Tight Spot, and The Burglar.

On February 19, 2019, Arrow Films issued the film on Blu-ray in both region A and B editions as part of their Arrow Academy series.

== Adaptation ==
The film was loosely remade in 1964 by Egyptian actress Fatin Hamama as The Last Night.

The film was loosely remade as Dead of Winter (1987), directed by Arthur Penn.
