= Don't Open the Door =

1945 novel

- First edition
- Author: Anthony Gilbert
- Language: English
- Series: Arthur Crook
- Genre: Mystery thriller
- Publisher: Collins Crime Club (UK); A.S. Barnes (US)
- Publication date: 1945
- Publication place: United Kingdom
- Media type: Print
- Preceded by: The Scarlet Button
- Followed by: The Black Stage

Don't Open the Door is a 1945 mystery thriller novel by Anthony Gilbert, the pen name of British writer Lucy Beatrice Malleson. It is the fifteenth in her long-running series featuring the unscrupulous London solicitor Arthur Crook, one of the more unorthodox detectives of the Golden Age. It was published in the United States with the alternative title Death Lifts the Latch.

== Synopsis ==
On a foggy night, nurse Nora Deane heads to the house of her latest patient, an invalid Adela Newstead. Mrs Newstead seems terrified and once alone asks Nora to make contact with a man named Herbert without letting her husband know. But the next morning Mrs Newstead is dead. Nora then contacts Herbert and finds out he is the late woman's brother, who suspect there is foul play involved.

== Bibliography ==
- Magill, Frank Northen . Critical Survey of Mystery and Detective Fiction: Authors, Volume 2. Salem Press, 1988.
- Murphy, Bruce F. The Encyclopedia of Murder and Mystery. Springer, 1999.
- Reilly, John M. Twentieth Century Crime & Mystery Writers. Springer, 2015.
