= The Clock in the Hatbox =

1939 novel

- First edition (UK)
- Author: Anthony Gilbert
- Language: English
- Series: Arthur Crook
- Genre: Mystery thriller
- Publisher: Collins Crime Club
- Publication date: 1939
- Publication place: United Kingdom
- Media type: Print
- Preceded by: Treason in My Breast
- Followed by: The Bell of Death

The Clock in the Hatbox is a 1939 mystery detective novel by Anthony Gilbert, the pen name of British writer Lucy Beatrice Malleson. It is the fifth in her long-running series featuring the shady London lawyer and detective Arthur Crook. It was published during the Golden Age of Detective Fiction. Reviewing it for the Times Literary Supplement, Maurice Percy Ashley noted "The tale is very fairly told. Mr. Gilbert, whose work has not perhaps always been sufficiently appreciated in the past, has written a thoroughly entertaining story".

== Synopsis ==
One of the jurors at the trial of the attractive Viola Ross, accused largely on circumstantial evidence of smothering her husband, has severe doubts about the case. The lone dissenter on the jury preventing a unanimous verdict of murder, a retrial is ordered. Convinced now of her innocence he engages the solicitor Arthur Crook to investigate the case and discover what really occurred.

== Bibliography ==
- Magill, Frank Northen . Critical Survey of Mystery and Detective Fiction: Authors, Volume 2. Salem Press, 1988.
- Murphy, Bruce F. The Encyclopedia of Murder and Mystery. Springer, 1999.
- Reilly, John M. Twentieth Century Crime & Mystery Writers. Springer, 2015.
