= Footsteps Behind Me =

1953 novel

- First edition (UK)
- Author: Anthony Gilbert
- Language: English
- Series: Arthur Crook
- Genre: Mystery thriller
- Publisher: Collins Crime Club (UK); Harper & Brothers (US)
- Publication date: 1953
- Publication place: United Kingdom
- Media type: Print
- Preceded by: Miss Pinnegar Disappears
- Followed by: Snake in the Grass

Footsteps Behind Me is a 1953 mystery detective novel by Anthony Gilbert, the pen name of British writer Lucy Beatrice Malleson. It is the twenty seventh in her long-running series featuring the unscrupulous solicitor and detective Arthur Crook. Crook first appeared during the Golden Age of Detective Fiction, but the series ran for several decades. It was published in the United States under the alternative title Black Death.

== Synopsis ==
A blackmailer targets four people he knows will pay over large sums rather than have their secrets exposed. To his surprise, however, at least one of the is prepared to murder him to keep his mouth shut.

== Bibliography ==
- Magill, Frank Northen . Critical Survey of Mystery and Detective Fiction: Authors, Volume 2. Salem Press, 1988.
- Murphy, Bruce F. The Encyclopedia of Murder and Mystery. Springer, 1999.
- Reilly, John M. Twentieth Century Crime & Mystery Writers. Springer, 2015.
