= They Met in the Dark =

- French theatrical poster
- Directed by: Karel Lamač
- Written by: Anatole de Grunwald; Miles Malleson; Basil Bartlett; Victor McClure; James Seymour
- Based on: The Vanishing Corpse by Anthony Gilbert
- Produced by: Marcel Hellman
- Starring: James Mason; Joyce Howard; Tom Walls
- Cinematography: Otto Heller
- Edited by: Winifred Cooper; Terence Fisher
- Music by: Benjamin Frankel
- Production company: Excelsior Films
- Distributed by: General Film Distributors (UK)
- Release date: 1 November 1943 (UK)
- Running time: 104 minutes
- Country: United Kingdom
- Language: English

They Met in the Dark (also known as Dark End and Spionagering M) is a 1943 British comedy thriller film directed by Karel Lamač and starring James Mason, Joyce Howard and Edward Rigby. The screenplay concerns a cashiered Royal Naval officer and a young woman who join forces to solve a murder and hunt down a German spy ring. The film features a single song sung by Phyllis Stanley, "Toddle Along" (Ben Frankel, Moira Heath). The film is very loosely based on the 1941 novel The Vanishing Corpse by Anthony Gilbert.

== Plot ==
Commander R. F. Heritage is dismissed from the Royal Navy during the Second World War after being found guilty of losing some top secret documents.

He revisits his places of the previous few days – mainly involving a string of women.

He starts with Mary, a manicurist, in Blackpool. They originally meet in the Hotel Monopole. She has something to impart but then arranges to reconvene in the Bell & Dragon public house outside town. She’s not there and he is sent to a remote cottage up the road.

Meanwhile a young Canadian woman, Miss Verity, arrives at the cottage and finds Mary dead, clutching a note with the words "Child's Theatrical Agency". She barricades the door when Heritage knocks and he leaves. She has seen his face and, when he comes back the next day, she takes the bus to Blackpool and reports the murder to the police. Heritage follows her to the police station. They return to the cottage with the police, but the body is missing. The police threaten to charge Miss Verity with filing a false police report.

Both head to Child's Theatrical Agency in London and from there to the BBC. Heritage brings a different woman, a sophisticated singer, who is coming for an audition. He then wanders off, looking for something. The Canadian woman follows him.

On the train north to Liverpool – where Child has a dance academy – she doesn’t realise she is being interrogated by enemy agents. The female agent tries to have her shot in the dark as they go through a tunnel but manages to steal Miss Verity’s handbag. Heritage rescues her at the barrier when she tries to leave without a ticket.

Meanwhile, Child and his hypnotist - the Great Riccardo - also arrive in Liverpool and hypnotise a Royal Navy officer (Petty Officer Grant) into giving away some secret plans regarding HMS Dandelion, commanded by Lippinscott. They want to hypnotise Miss Verity to see what she knows.

In a bar, Heritage's former batman Mansel starts a fight to cause a diversion. Heritage then rescues Miss Verity from the hypnotist.

In the bar Carter sends a woman (Bobby) to chat with Commander Lippinscott. As they sit, the harmonica player sends a coded message (hidden in the notes of the music).

Lippinscott and Heritage eventually get together and it appears both are pawns in a bigger game to trap the traitors.

In the morning Bobby leaves in a car with Lippinscott, The spies go into their hotel bedroom.

Miss Verity tails one of the spies to the countryside by hiding in the back of his car. She in turn is trailed by Mansel and the police. Here the Great Riccardo is trying to dispose of the body of the manicurist hidden inside his garden scarecrow by burning and burying it.

Back in the hotel, experts in disguise decode the musical notation played by the harmonica player proving the sinister plot. Carter and Dr Benson then do a magic act. They pickpocket the message from Lippinscott during the act but do not realise the message in his pocket is blank. Heritage gets on stage as a volunteer and exposes the whole scam, explaining that the room is surrounded by police. Heritage and Miss Verity kiss and she is at a loss what to say further.

== Cast ==
- James Mason as Richard Francis Heritage
- Joyce Howard as Laura Verity
- Tom Walls as Christopher Child
- Phyllis Stanley as Lily Bernard
- Edward Rigby as Mansel
- Ronald Ward as Carter
- David Farrar as Commander Lippinscott
- Karel Stepanek as Riccardo
- Betty Warren as Fay
- Patricia Medina as Mary, the manicurist
- Walter Crisham as Charlie
- George Robey as pawnbroker
- Ronald Chesney as Max, mouth harmonica player
- Peggy Dexter as Bobby
- Finlay Currie as Merchant Captain
- Brefni O'Rorke as Detective Inspector Burrows
- Leonard Sharp as bus conductor
- Terence de Marney as code expert
- Anthony Dawson as 2nd code expert

== Production ==
The film was shot at Teddington Studios in London with sets were designed by the art director Norman G. Arnold.

== Critical reception ==
The Monthly Film Bulletin wrote: "Joyce Howard is very attractive as Laura, James Mason is good as Heritage, and Tom Walls is suavely sinister as Child. There is a long and distinguished cast, including Edward Rigby as an old petty officer who supports Heritage through thick and thin. Some others, notably George Robey, Jeanne de Casalis and Finlay Currie, make all too brief appearances."

Radio Times noted "an old-fashioned, run-of-the-mill and unlikely espionage thriller-come-romance, it was topical during the Second World War years, but is rather unrewarding now."

Britmovie wrote, "there are capable performances from all involved but it’s Tom Walls, the urbane Aldwych farceur, who steals the limelight when cast against type as a charming villain."
