= A Nice Cup of Tea (novel) =

1950 novel

- First edition
- Author: Anthony Gilbert
- Language: English
- Series: Arthur Crook
- Genre: Mystery thriller
- Publisher: Collins Crime Club
- Publication date: 1950
- Publication place: United Kingdom
- Media type: Print
- Preceded by: Murder Comes Home
- Followed by: Lady Killer

A Nice Cup of Tea is a 1950 mystery thriller novel by the British writer Anthony Gilbert. It was published in the United States under the alternative title The Wrong Body. It is the twenty fourth in the long-running series featuring the unscrupulous lawyer and detective Arthur Crook.

== Television adaptation ==
In 1957 it was adapted into a British television film My Guess Would Be Murder, produced by the BBC and starring Nora Nicholson, Everley Gregg and Ethel Coleridge.
