= The Vanishing Corpse =

1941 novel

- First edition
- Author: Anthony Gilbert
- Language: English
- Series: Arthur Crook
- Genre: Mystery thriller
- Publisher: Collins Crime Club (UK); Arcadia Press (US)
- Publication date: 1941
- Publication place: United Kingdom
- Media type: Print
- Preceded by: Dear Dead Woman
- Followed by: The Woman in Red

The Vanishing Corpse is a 1941 mystery thriller novel by Anthony Gilbert, the pen name of British writer Lucy Beatrice Malleson. It is the eighth in her long-running series featuring the unscrupulous London solicitor Arthur Crook, one of the more unorthodox detectives of the Golden Age. It was published in the United States under the alternative title She Vanished in the Dawn.

== Synopsis ==
Laura Verity, tired of life, decides to rent a very isolated cottage in the countryside. On arriving there in the darkness in the middle of the storm, she is shocked to find evidence that there is somebody else in the house. Shortly afterwards she discovers a body of a young woman, strangled to death, on the bed. Terrified, in the morning she hurries into the nearest market town to report the crime, only to find the police dubious about her claims - particularly when they return to the cottage with her and find no body. Only Arthur Crook, a dishevelled lawyer she encounter, is ready to believe her. He suggests that she is now in grave danger from the murderer and persuades her to move to a large, busy hotel in Brighton where she will be safer.

The determined Verity perseveres in trying to solve the mystery, assisted at first in an offhand way by Crook. Newspaper publicity at last draws the police into the case, and with Crook's advice they find a body hidden in the well of the cottage. It soon proves to be not the corpse of the missing young woman, but the cottage's previous owner. To add to the confusion Miss Verity has herself now vanished, with Crook concerned that she has fallen into the hands of the murderer.

== Adaptation ==
In 1943 it was very loosely adapted into the British film They Met in the Dark directed by Carl Lamac and starring James Mason, Joyce Howard, Tom Walls. This featured many changes to the novel's plot, including the complete absence of Arthur Crook.

== Bibliography ==
- Goble, Alan. The Complete Index to Literary Sources in Film. Walter de Gruyter, 1999.
- Magill, Frank Northen . Critical Survey of Mystery and Detective Fiction: Authors, Volume 2. Salem Press, 1988.
- Murphy, Bruce F. The Encyclopedia of Murder and Mystery. Springer, 1999.
- Reilly, John M. Twentieth Century Crime & Mystery Writers. Springer, 2015.
