= Miss Pinnegar Disappears =

1952 novel

- First edition
- Author: Anthony Gilbert
- Language: English
- Series: Arthur Crook
- Genre: Mystery thriller
- Publisher: Collins; Harper (US)
- Publication date: 1952
- Publication place: United Kingdom
- Media type: Print
- Preceded by: Lady Killer
- Followed by: Footsteps Behind Me

Miss Pinnegar Disappears is a 1952 mystery detective novel by Anthony Gilbert, the pen name of British writer Lucy Beatrice Malleson. It is the twenty sixth in her long-running series featuring the unscrupulous solicitor and detective Arthur Crook. Crook first appeared during the Golden Age of Detective Fiction, but the series ran for several decades. It was published in the United States under the alternative title A Case for Mr. Crook.

== Synopsis ==
Crook meets Frances Pinnegar at a bus stop and after giving her a lift home offers her his card in case she ever needs his professional services. Miss Pinnegar is a respectable retired nurse so this hardly seems likely. However when trouble arises some months later she sends him an urgent phone message, but he gets there too late as she has already vanished.

== Bibliography ==
- Magill, Frank Northen . Critical Survey of Mystery and Detective Fiction: Authors, Volume 2. Salem Press, 1988.
- Murphy, Bruce F. The Encyclopedia of Murder and Mystery. Springer, 1999.
- Reilly, John M. Twentieth Century Crime & Mystery Writers. Springer, 2015.
