= Marc Shmuger =

American entertainment executive (b. 1958)

Marc Shmuger (born June 27, 1958) is an American entertainment executive and film producer. From 1998 to 2009 he was working for Universal Pictures, where he became chairman in 2006. From February 2016 to December 2017 he was the CEO of EuropaCorp.

== Biography ==
Marc Shmuger studied English and film studies from 1976 to 1980 at Wesleyan University and holds a Bachelor of Arts.

He started his career in the entertainment industry in the 1980s, where he worked e.g. as a creative consultant and script supervisor. Together with Mark Malone he wrote the script for the horror thriller Dead of Winter, which was filmed by Arthur Penn in 1987.

From May 1991 until May 1998 Shmuger worked at the marketing department of Sony Pictures Entertainment, where he was involved in the marketing of Luc Besson's movies Léon: The Professional and The Fifth Element. At Sony, Shmuger became Executive Vice President of Marketing. Afterwards he joined Universal Pictures as President of Marketing, and was later promoted Vice Chairman. In March 2006, Shmuger was promoted to Chairman of Universal Pictures with David Linde becoming Co-Chairman. At this position, he was among other things in charge of promoting movies on new video websites like YouTube. In October 2009, Shmuger and Linde were ousted from Universal Pictures .

In 2011, Shmuger founded his own production company, Global Produce, that e.g. produced Alex Gibney's documentary films We Steal Secrets: The Story of WikiLeaks and Zero Days. He was also rumored to be working on a new Scarface movie, Spacesuit: Fashioning Apollo, an adaptation of Nicholas de Monchaux's book, and a remake of Timecop.

In February 2016, Shmuger became CEO of Luc Besson's EuropaCorp. He held that position until the end of 2017 and stepped down on 31 December 2017 as the company was facing a harsh financial slop. As CEO of Europacorp, he led many restructuring actions such as raising funds, offloading noncore assets, restructuring the company's debt and reducing operational costs. He kept working as a consultant for EuropaCorp on Besson's movie Anna.

He is married to Louise Hamagami and has two sons.

== Other roles ==
- Partner at KKM Global Brand Strategies.
- Member of the Academy of Motion Picture Arts and Sciences
- Member of the Academy of Television Arts & Sciences
- Member of the Board of Trustees for American Film Institute

== Awards ==
- 1999, 2000: Entertainment Marketer of the Year by Advertising Age

== Selected filmography ==
Producer

- 1987: Dead of Winter (also scriptwriter)
- 2013: We Steal Secrets: The Story of WikiLeaks (documentary)
- 2016: Zero Days (documentary)
- 2019: Anna

Executive Producer

- 2013: The Spectacular Now
- 2014: Lucy
- 2017: The Circle
