= Death in Fancy Dress =

1933 novel

- First edition
- Author: Anthony Gilbert
- Language: English
- Genre: Mystery
- Publisher: Collins Crime Club
- Publication date: 1933
- Publication place: United Kingdom
- Media type: Print

Death in Fancy Dress is a 1933 mystery detective novel by the British writer Anthony Gilbert, the pen name of Lucy Beatrice Malleson. It was republished in 2019 by British Library Publishing as part of a series featuring traditional crime novels. It takes the form of a country house mystery, a popular branch of the genre during the era.

== Synopsis ==
A notorious blackmailer is haunting London Society, leading to several suicides. The Home Office's attempt to capture them leads to a fancy dress ball at the country estate Feltham Abbey, where things come to a head when the host Sir Ralph Feltham is found dead in the grounds.

== Bibliography ==
- Magill, Frank Northen . Critical Survey of Mystery and Detective Fiction: Authors, Volume 2. Salem Press, 1988.
- Reilly, John M. Twentieth Century Crime & Mystery Writers. Springer, 2015.
