= Information Received (novel) =

1933 novel

- 1955 edition
- Author: E. R. Punshon
- Language: English
- Series: Bobby Owen
- Genre: Crime
- Publisher: Ernest Benn (UK); Houghton Mifflin (US)
- Publication date: 1933
- Publication place: United Kingdom
- Media type: Print
- Followed by: Death Among The Sunbathers

Information Received is a 1933 mystery crime novel by the British writer E. R. Punshon. It is the first in his series of thirty five novels featuring Detective Constable Bobby Owen of Scotland Yard, replacing his previous series of five novels featuring Inspector Carter published between 1929 and 1932. It was reviewed by Dorothy L. Sayers.

Ralph Partridge in the New Statesman felt that the new book was "not one of his best. He is not as happy with his new detective, a young police constable educated at Oxford, as he used to be with Inspector Carter and Sergeant Bell". It was republished in 1955, as a paperback by Penguin Books.

== Bibliography ==
- Hubin, Allen J. Crime Fiction, 1749–1980: A Comprehensive Bibliography. Garland Publishing, 1984.
- Kenney, Catherine McGehee. The Remarkable Case of Dorothy L. Sayers. Kent State University Press, 1990.
