= The Musical Comedy Crime =

1933 novel

- First edition (UK)
- Author: Anthony Gilbert
- Language: English
- Series: Scott Egerton
- Genre: Mystery thriller
- Publisher: Collins Crime Club
- Publication date: 1933
- Publication place: United Kingdom
- Media type: Print
- Preceded by: The Long Shadow
- Followed by: An Old Lady Dies

The Musical Comedy Crime is a 1933 mystery detective novel by Anthony Gilbert, the pen name of British writer Lucy Beatrice Malleson. It is the seventh entry of the series featuring Scott Egerton, her principal character before her better known creation Arthur Crook appeared three years later. A traditional whodunnit, it was published during the Golden Age of Detective Fiction.

== Synopsis ==
Major John Hillier is killed in his London flat by his servant. Inspector Field of Scotland Yard traced his movements the night before his death and found he had attended a performance at a suburban theatre. It takes Scott Egerton to finally crack the case.

== Bibliography ==
- Iwaschkin, Roman. Popular Music: A Reference Guide. Routledge, 2016.
- Magill, Frank Northen . Critical Survey of Mystery and Detective Fiction: Authors, Volume 2. Salem Press, 1988.
- Murphy, Bruce F. The Encyclopedia of Murder and Mystery. Springer, 1999.
- Reilly, John M. Twentieth Century Crime & Mystery Writers. Springer, 2015.
