= The Spinster's Secret =

1946 novel

- First edition
- Author: Anthony Gilbert
- Language: English
- Series: Arthur Crook
- Genre: Mystery thriller
- Publisher: Collins Crime Club (UK); A.S. Barnes (US)
- Publication date: 1946
- Publication place: United Kingdom
- Media type: Print
- Preceded by: The Black Stage
- Followed by: Death in the Wrong Room

The Spinster's Secret is a 1946 mystery detective novel by Anthony Gilbert, the pen name of British writer Lucy Beatrice Malleson. First published in London by the Collins Crime Club it is the eighteenth in her long-running series featuring the unscrupulous London solicitor Arthur Crook, one of the more unorthodox investigators of the Golden Age of Detective Fiction. It was published in the United States by Barnes under the alternative title By Hook or By Crook.

== Bibliography ==
- Magill, Frank Northen . Critical Survey of Mystery and Detective Fiction: Authors, Volume 2. Salem Press, 1988.
- Murphy, Bruce F. The Encyclopedia of Murder and Mystery. Springer, 1999.
- Reilly, John M. Twentieth Century Crime & Mystery Writers. Springer, 2015.
