= Cong Weixi =

Chinese novelist (1933–2019)

- Born: 7 April 1933; Yutian County, Hebei, China
- Died: 29 October 2019 (aged 86); Beijing, China
- Occupations: Novelist, editor
- Spouse: Zhang Hu
- Writing career
- Language: Chinese
- Period: 1950–2019
- Genre: High Wall Literature
- Subject: Laogai
- Notable works: The Blood-Stained Magnolias (1979), Grass in the Northern Country (1984), Entering Chaos (1988–1998)

Chinese name
- Traditional Chinese: 從維熙
- Simplified Chinese: 从维熙
Transcriptions
Standard Mandarin
- Hanyu Pinyin: Cóng Wéixī
- Wade–Giles: Ts'ung Wei-hsi
- IPA: [tsʰʊ̌ŋ wěɪɕí]

Pen name
- Chinese: 碧征
Transcriptions
Standard Mandarin
- Hanyu Pinyin: Bì Zhēng

Other pen name
- Traditional Chinese: 從纓
- Simplified Chinese: 从缨
Transcriptions
Standard Mandarin
- Hanyu Pinyin: Cóng Yīng

Cong Weixi (Chinese: 从维熙; 7 April 1933 – 29 October 2019), who also used the pen names Bi Zheng (碧征) and Cong Ying (从缨), was a Chinese novelist. Condemned as a "rightist" during the Anti-Rightist Campaign in 1957, he spent 20 years in the laogai ("reform through labor") camps. Following his release in 1978, he published China's first novel on laogai and founded the "High Wall Literature" genre that depicts the traumas suffered by political prisoners in the labor camps. Highly influential in the post-Cultural Revolution literary scene, his works have been translated into many languages.

== Early life and career ==
Cong was born on 7 April 1933 in Daiguantun, Zunhua County (now part of Yutian County) in Hebei, Republic of China. His grandfather held a xiucai degree during the late Qing dynasty, and his father worked as an aeronautical engineer in Chongqing. In 1937, his father died in prison after being arrested by the Kuomintang government for attempting to defect to the Communist Party. His mother, an illiterate woman with bound feet, brought the four-year-old Cong to live with her parents. They moved to Beijing in 1946 where Cong attended school. After the establishment of the People's Republic of China, he enrolled at Beijing Normal School in 1950 and published his first essay, "Going to the Battle", about patriotic youths fighting in the Korean War.

After graduating from Beijing Normal School in 1953, Cong taught at an elementary school for half a year before joining the Beijing Daily as a reporter. In 1955, he published July Rain (七月雨), his first short-story collection. He published a second collection, The Morning Sun Rises (曙光升起的早晨), and a novel, Spring Morning along South River (南河春晓), in the next two years, earning himself recognition as an emerging writer.

== Anti-Rightist Campaign and laogai ==
During the Hundred Flowers Campaign, when the Communist government invited opinions and criticisms from intellectuals, Cong published the essay "A Few Questions Concerning Socialist Realism" in the April 1957 issue of the journal Beijing Literature and Art, in which he questioned the need for the adjective "socialist" in socialist realism and argued that the term excessively emphasized politics and encouraged formulaic writing. His friend Liu Shaotang also wrote an essay criticizing socialist realism in the same journal.

The Communist Party soon turned against intellectuals who criticized its policies and started the Anti-Rightist Campaign in 1957. Beijing Literature and Art published an article calling Cong and Liu "poisonous weeds" who had been lured to "stick their heads out above ground". Cong was soon denounced as a "rightist" and a member of a "counterrevolutionary clique", together with Liu Shaotang, Wang Meng, and Deng Youmei. The four writers were collectively known as the "Four Black Swans" (四只黑天鹅) of Beijing.

Cong's wife Zhang Hu (张沪), who was also a reporter at Beijing Daily, was condemned as a rightist at the same time for criticizing excessive formalism and bureaucracy at her employer. After being publicly humiliated, she attempted to kill herself by taking sleeping pills, but was saved (she later attempted suicide for a second time during the Cultural Revolution and was saved again). The couple were both arrested and sent to different laogai ("reform through labor") camps, leaving their infant son with Cong's mother. Cong and Zhang did not see each other for more than a year, until they were both sent to Qinghe Farm, a notorious labor camp outside of Tianjin. A kind prison guard arranged to have him stay overnight at her camp.

Cong endured 20 years in a variety of laogai camps, even after his "rightist" label was removed. He worked in coal mines, quarried rocks, dug graves and transported manure.

== Post-laogai career and "High Wall Literature" ==
After the death of Mao Zedong and the end of the Cultural Revolution in 1976, Cong was released and rehabilitated in 1978. He eagerly resumed writing, using his laogai experience as an inspiration. In 1979, he published the novella The Blood-Stained Magnolias under the High Wall (大墙下的红玉兰), about a labor camp inmate being killed by the camp guard. The first Chinese novel about laogai camps, it initiated the "High Wall" genre of literature (大墙文学; "high wall" being a euphemism for prison), which reflects on the traumas suffered by political prisoners in the camps during the Anti-Rightist Campaign and the Cultural Revolution. Writer Wang Meng, who served as China's Minister of Culture, called Cong the "Father of High Wall Literature".

Cong subsequently wrote a number of works in the "High Wall" genre, including the novella Snow Falling Silently onto the Yellow River (雪落黄河静无声), the long novel The Fugitive (逃犯), which consists of three novellas, and the novella Grave Stone for a Cat. In 1988, he published the first two parts of his memoir Entering Chaos (走向混沌). After conducting further research and revisiting the labor camps he had worked at, he published the third and fourth parts of the memoir to much acclaim. They attest to the "horror, cruelty, and absurdity" of the laogai system, which is often compared with the Gulag system of the Soviet Union.

In 1982, Cong revised the novel Grass in the Northern Country (北国草). He had begun writing the novel in 1955, but lost the manuscript during the Cultural Revolution. He was able to recover it after his release from laogai, and finally published the book in 1984. He received more than 1,000 letters from readers after its publication. The novel won four national and municipal literature prizes. He also published a collection of short stories Drinking Soul Going West (酒魂西行) in 1990, and the autobiographical novel Naked Snow (裸雪) in 1994. The latter, written from a child's perspective and set in the Republican era of Cong's childhood, is vastly different from his typical laogai fiction.

Cong's works have been highly influential in post-Mao China. They have been translated into English, French, German, Japanese and Serbian. Although known for his works about the "Chinese Gulag", Cong did not want to be compared to the Soviet writer Aleksandr Solzhenitsyn and wrote the essay "I Am Not Solzhenitsyn". He criticized Solzhenitsyn for being too one-sided and negative, recalling his personal experience with a kind prison guard.

Cong served as chief editor of the Writers Publishing House, but was forced to resign after the 1989 Tiananmen Square protests.

He died on 29 October 2019 in Beijing, aged 86.
