= E. R. Punshon =

English novelist (1872–1956)

Ernest Robertson Punshon (born East Dulwich, London 25 June 1872 – died Streatham, London 23 October 1956) was an English novelist and literary critic of the early to mid 20th century. He also wrote under the pseudonyms Robertson Halkett and Robertson Halket. Primarily writing on crime and deduction, he enjoyed some literary success in the 1930s and 1940s. Today, he is remembered, in the main, as the creator of Police Constable Bobby Owen, the protagonist of many of Punshon's novels, who was eventually promoted to sergeant, inspector, superintendent and, finally, commander. A popular Scotland Yard detective, Owen appeared in 35 novels from 1933 to 1956. Punshon reviewed many of Agatha Christie's novels for The Guardian on their first publication. Punshon was also a prolific writer of short stories, and a selection of his crime and horror fiction has recently been collected together. Punshon is known for his novel Information Received (1933).

== Novels ==
=== Stand-alone ===
- Earth's Great Lord (1901)
- Constance West (1905)
- ’’Ensnared: The Mystery of the Iron Room (1905). Serialised, Scraps
- ’’Mr Nugent’’ (1906)
- Rhoda in Between (1906)
- The Mystery of Lady Isobel (1906)
- The Choice (1908)
- ’’The Spin of the Coin, or Love Conquers Crime’’ (1909). Serialised, Hartlepool Daily Mail
- ’’A Gentleman Burglar’’ (1909)
- The Glittering Desire (1910)
- ’’The Miser Earl’’ (1910)
- ’’The Red Parasol’’ (1911)
- The Wilderness Lovers (1912)
- Hidden Lives (1913)
- The Crowning Glory (1914)
- Arrows of Chance (1917)
- The Solitary House (1918)
- The Woman's Footprint (1919)
- ’’The Mill Owner’’ (1921)
- Promise of Dawn (1921)
- Old Fighting Days (1921)
- The Bittermeads Mystery (1922)
- Dunslow (1922)
- ’’The Millionaire’s Daughter’’ (1926)
- The Blue John Diamond (1929)

=== Carter and Bell series ===
- The Unexpected Legacy (1929)
- Proof, Counter Proof (1931)
- Footprints in Red. Serialised: Staffordshire Sentinel (1931) (This would appear to be a serialisation of "Proof, Counter Proof")
- The Cottage Murder (1932)
- Genius in Murder (1932)
- Truth Came Out (1932)

=== Bobby Owen series ===
- Information Received (1933)
- Death Among The Sunbathers (1934)
- Crossword Mystery (1934)
- Mystery Villa (1934)
- Death of A Beauty Queen (1935)
- Death Comes to Cambers (1935)
- The Bath Mysteries (1936)
- Mystery of Mr. Jessop (1937)
- The Dusky Hour (1937)
- Dictator's Way (1938)
- Comes a Stranger (1938)
- Suspects – Nine (1939)
- Murder Abroad (1939)
- Four Strange Women (1940)
- Ten Star Clues (1941)
- The Dark Garden (1941)
- Diabolic Candelabra (1942)
- The Conqueror Inn (1943)
- Secrets Can't be Kept (1944)
- Night's Cloak (1944)
- There's a Reason for Everything (1946)
- It Might Lead Anywhere (1946)
- Helen Passes By (1947)
- Music Tells All (1948)
- The House of Godwinsson (1948)
- So Many Doors (1949)
- Everybody Always Tells (1950)
- The Golden Dagger (1951)
- The Secret Search (1951)
- The Attending Truth (1952)
- Strange Ending (1953)
- Brought to Light (1954)
- Dark Is The Clue (1955)
- Triple Quest (1955)
- Six Were Present (1956)

== Short stories ==
- God's Will. Pearson's Magazine, August 1899
- Priscilla and the Duke. Cassell's Magazine, October 1903
- Veronica’s Captuve. The Idler, November 1903
- The Brantingham Ghost. Cassell's Magazine, December 1903
- Sir Harry's Wager. Royal Magazine, May 1904
- The Little Red Devil. The Smart Set, August 1904. Collected in Bobby Owen, Black Magic, Bloodshed & Burglary: Selected Short Stories of E. R. Punshon
- Two Gentlemen in Armour. Cassell's Magazine, November 1904
- A Bit of Gossip. The Bystander, 1 August 1906
- ’’Annabel Fights’’. Grand Magazine, March 1907
- ’’An Old Time Love Story’’. Midland Counties Tribune, 16 March 1907
- ’’Professor Kenyon’s Engagement’’. Cassell’s, May 1907
- ’’A Seaside Singer’’. Weekly Irish Times, 25 May 1907
- ’’The Alphabet Toast’’. The Idler, October 1907
- A Fairy Visit. The Sphere, 27 December 1913
- Blind Trails. Flynn's, July–August 1925
- Too Late for His Hat and Coat. Best Detective Magazine, November 1934
- The Living Stone. Cornhill Magazine, September 1939. Collected in Bobby Owen, Black Magic, Bloodshed & Burglary: Selected Short Stories of E. R. Punshon
- Good Beginning. MacKill's Mystery Magazine, October 1952 (Owen). Collected in Bobby Owen, Black Magic, Bloodshed & Burglary: Selected Short Stories of E. R. Punshon
- Dead Man's Hand. MacKill's Mystery Magazine, April 1953. Collected in Bobby Owen, Black Magic, Bloodshed & Burglary: Selected Short Stories of E. R. Punshon
- Find the Lady. MacKill's Mystery Magazine, May 1953. Collected in Bobby Owen, Black Magic, Bloodshed & Burglary: Selected Short Stories of E. R. Punshon
- The Tide Runs Strongly. MacKill's Mystery Magazine, August 1954 (Owen). Collected in Bobby Owen, Black Magic, Bloodshed & Burglary: Selected Short Stories of E. R. Punshon
- Three Sovereigns for a Corpse. The Saint Detective Magazine, April 1955 (Owen). Collected in Bobby Owen, Black Magic, Bloodshed & Burglary: Selected Short Stories of E. R. Punshon
- A Study in the Obvious (Owen). Collected in Bobby Owen, Black Magic, Bloodshed & Burglary: Selected Short Stories of E. R. Punshon
- Making Sure (Owen). Collected in Bobby Owen, Black Magic, Bloodshed & Burglary: Selected Short Stories of E. R. Punshon
- The Haunted Chessmen. Collected in Bobby Owen, Black Magic, Bloodshed & Burglary: Selected Short Stories of E. R. Punshon
- Black Magic. Collected in Bobby Owen, Black Magic, Bloodshed & Burglary: Selected Short Stories of E. R. Punshon
- The Long Lane. Collected in Bobby Owen, Black Magic, Bloodshed & Burglary: Selected Short Stories of E. R. Punshon
- The Last Ascent. Collected in Bobby Owen, Black Magic, Bloodshed & Burglary: Selected Short Stories of E. R. Punshon
- From Beyond the Barrier. Collected in Bobby Owen, Black Magic, Bloodshed & Burglary: Selected Short Stories of E. R. Punshon
- The Unknown Quantity. Collected in Bobby Owen, Black Magic, Bloodshed & Burglary: Selected Short Stories of E. R. Punshon
- The Elixir of Life. Collected in Bobby Owen, Black Magic, Bloodshed & Burglary: Selected Short Stories of E. R. Punshon
- The Miracle Worker. Collected in Bobby Owen, Black Magic, Bloodshed & Burglary: Selected Short Stories of E. R. Punshon
- My Day of Vengeance. Collected in Bobby Owen, Black Magic, Bloodshed & Burglary: Selected Short Stories of E. R. Punshon
- The Camp Fire. Collected in Bobby Owen, Black Magic, Bloodshed & Burglary: Selected Short Stories of E. R. Punshon
- Lady Betty and the Burglars. Collected in Bobby Owen, Black Magic, Bloodshed & Burglary: Selected Short Stories of E. R. Punshon
- The Avenging Phonograph. Collected in Bobby Owen, Black Magic, Bloodshed & Burglary: Selected Short Stories of E. R. Punshon
