= Siebenstein =

1933 play by German writer Maxim Ziese

- Written by: Maxim Ziese
- Original language: German
- Genre: War

Premiere
- Date premiered: 29 March 1933
- Place premiered: Deutsches Theater, Berlin

Siebenstein is a 1933 play by the German writer Maxim Ziese. It is a First World War drama. It premiered at the Deutsches Theater in Berlin in March 1933 with Jürgen Fehling directing and a cast that included Veit Harlan, Lothar Müthel and Hilde Körber. Staged just as the Nazi Party was taking power in Germany, it is a work of transition that is nationalistic and pro-military rather than explicitly Nazi. It was followed afterwards at the theatre by a more overtly Nazi work Schlageter by Hanns Johst.

== Bibliography ==
- Anonymous review of the premiere. Die Literatur. Monatsschrift für Literaturfreunde, vol. 35 (1932/33), p. 527. (online)
- Hostetter, Elisabeth Schulz. The Berlin State Theater Under the Nazi Regime: A Study of the Administration, Key Productions, and Critical Responses from 1933–1944. Edwin Mellen Press, 2004.
- Noack, Frank. Veit Harlan: The Life and Work of a Nazi Filmmaker. University Press of Kentucky, 2016.
