= Maxim Ziese =

German writer and dramaturg (1901–1955)

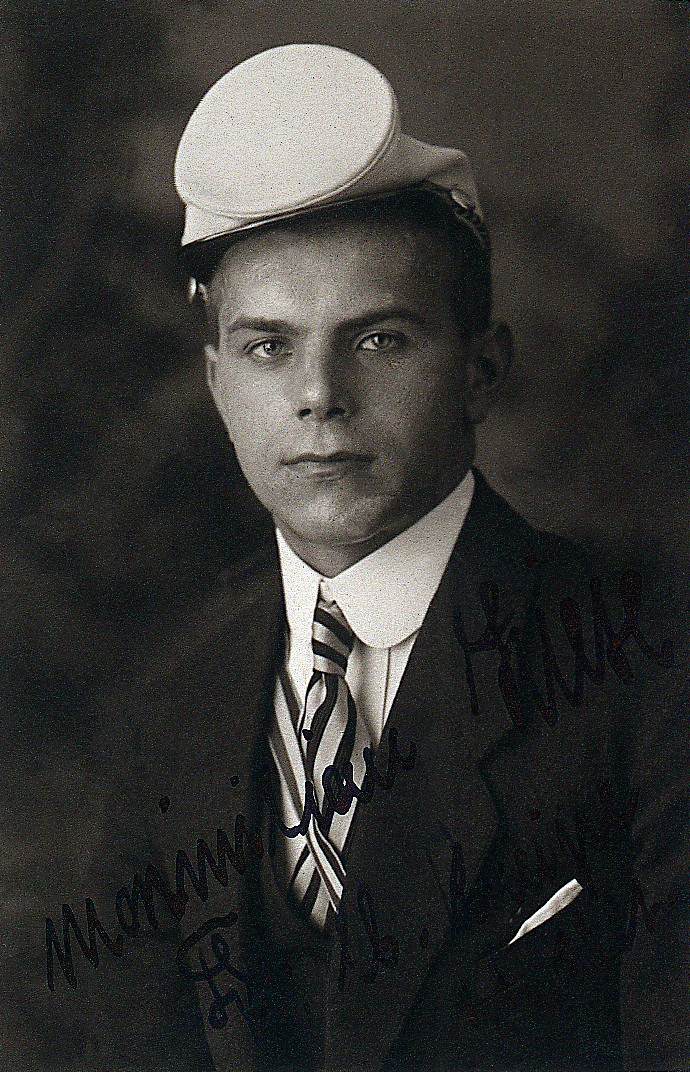
- Ziese in 1921.
- Born: 26 June 1901; Griesheim, German Empire
- Died: 16 July 1955 (aged 54); Cologne, West Germany
- Occupation: Writer

Maxim Ziese (1901–1955) was a German dramatist and writer. Of Pomeranian descent, he served in the First World War. He became a writer after the war, noted for his patriotic 1933 play Siebenstein. He later worked as a dramaturge under Gustaf Gründgens at the Prussian State Theatre.

== Bibliography ==
- Noack, Frank. Veit Harlan: The Life and Work of a Nazi Filmmaker. University Press of Kentucky, 2016.
