= Portrait of a Murderer (novel) =

1933 novel

- First edition
- Author: Anne Meredith
- Language: English
- Genre: Detective
- Publisher: Gollancz; Reynal (US)
- Publication date: 1933
- Publication place: United Kingdom
- Media type: Print

Portrait of a Murderer is a 1933 detective novel by Anne Meredith, the pen name of British writer Lucy Beatrice Malleson best known for writing as Anthony Gilbert. It was a stand-alone novel by the author at the time known for her series featuring Scott Egerton and later for her Arthur Crook mystery thrillers. It was reissued in 2017 by British Library Publishing. It broadly takes the structure of an inverted detective story, as from near the beginning the identity of the murderer is revealed.

== Synopsis ==
Adian Gray invites his six children to spend Christmas with him at his remote country house Kings Poplars. All of his children loathe him, which means there are several suspects with cause to have murdered him when his discovered dead on Christmas morning.

== Bibliography ==
- Ebury, Katherine. Modern Literature and the Death Penalty, 1890-1950. Springer Nature, 2020.
- Reilly, John M. Twentieth Century Crime & Mystery Writers. Springer, 2015.
