= Anthony Gilbert (writer) =

Pen name of British crime writer Lucy Malleson (1899–1973)

Anthony Gilbert was the pen name of Lucy Beatrice Malleson (15 February 1899 – 9 December 1973), an English crime writer and a cousin of actor-screenwriter Miles Malleson. She also wrote fiction and a 1940 autobiography, Three-a-Penny, as Anne Meredith.

== Biography ==
Lucy Malleson was born in Upper Norwood, Croydon. She attended St Paul's Girls' School. When her stockbroker father lost his job in 1914, the family suffered financial hardship, and she took up shorthand typing to earn a living. She began writing poetry, and then, inspired by the play The Cat and the Canary by John Willard (1922), she tried her hand at detective novels, using the name J. Kilmeny Keith. The first was The Man Who Was London, published in 1925. She published over sixty crime novels as Anthony Gilbert, most of which featured her best-known character, Arthur Crook. Crook is a vulgar London lawyer totally (and deliberately) unlike the sophisticated detectives, such as Lord Peter Wimsey and Philo Vance, who dominated the mystery field when Gilbert introduced him. Instead of dispassionately analysing a case, he usually enters it after seemingly damning evidence has built up against his client, then conducts a no-holds-barred investigation of doubtful ethics to clear him or her. As fellow mystery author Michael Gilbert noted, "...he behaved in a way which befitted his name and would not have been approved by the Law Society." The first Crook novel, Murder by Experts, was published in 1936 and was immediately popular. The last Crook novel, A Nice Little Killing, was published in 1974.

== Adaptations ==
Her novel The Vanishing Corpse (1941) was adapted as the film They Met in the Dark (1943), another novel, The Mouse Who Wouldn't Play Ball (1943) was filmed as Candles at Nine in 1944, and her novel on abduction and a faked identity, The Woman in Red, which features Arthur Crook and his assistant Bill Parsons (1941), was adapted as the 1945 film noir, My Name Is Julia Ross. "You'll Be the Death of Me," an October 1963 episode of The Alfred Hitchcock Hour, was adapted from Gilbert's short story "The Goldfish Button" in the February 1958 Ellery Queen Mystery Magazine. Her short stories "Door to a Different World" and "Fifty Years After" were Edgar Award nominees.

The 1942 novel Something Nasty in the Woodshed (American title Mystery in the Woodshed) was adapted for stage by Dennis Hoey as The Haven, opening in New York in 1946. Crook was played by Melville Cooper. The production received poor reviews and lasted only five performances.

== Revival ==
While Malleson's books sold well enough to keep publishers asking for more, she was never a best-seller. However, in 2017 interest in her was revived through the reissue of the Anne Meredith crime novel Portrait of a Murderer under the British Library's Crime Classics imprint. Martin Edwards believes this novel to be "a major departure. Dostoevsky was her model, although Anthony Berkeley's influence was also in play." Although quickly forgotten in 1933 it did win the praise of Dorothy L Sayers. The reissue sold many more copies than the original edition, and was followed by a reissue of the 1933 Anthony Gilbert novel, Death in Fancy Dress, as well as the Anne Meredith autobiography Three-a-Penny in December 2019. The title of the latter was taken from a remark made to her by Sayers: "Although authors are three-a-penny to us, they are quite exciting to other people." Three-a-Penny was also serialised on BBC Radio 4. The book also paints a vivid portrait of poverty between the wars in the East End of London.

== Bibliography ==
Novels as J. Kilmeny Keith

- The Man Who Was London, 1925
- The Sword of Harlequin, 1927

Novels as Anthony Gilbert (alternative titles for US publication)

- The Tragedy at Freyne, 1927
- The Murder of Mrs. Davenport, 1928
- Death at Four Corners, 1928
- The Mystery of the Open Window, 1929
- The Night of the Fog, 1930
- The Case Against Andrew Fane, 1931
- The Body on the Beam, 1932
- The Long Shadow, 1932
- Death in Fancy Dress, 1933, reissued 2019
- The Musical Comedy Crime, 1933
- An Old Lady Dies, 1934
- The Man in Button Boots, 1934
- The Man Who Was Too Clever, 1935
- Courtier to Death, 1936 (aka The Dover Train Mystery)
- Murder by Experts, 1936
- The Man Who Wasn't There, 1937
- Murder Has No Tongue, 1937
- Treason in My Breast, 1938
- The Clock in the Hatbox, 1939
- The Bell of Death, 1939
- Dear Dead Woman, 1940 (aka Death Takes a Redhead)
- The Vanishing Corpse, 1941 (aka She Vanished in the Dawn)
- The Woman in Red, 1941
- Something Nasty in the Woodshed, 1942
- The Case of the Tea Cosy's Aunt, 1942 (aka Death in the Blackout)
- The Mouse Who Wouldn't Play Ball, 1943 (aka 30 Days to Live)
- He Came by Night, 1944 (aka Death at the Door)
- A Spy for Mr Crook, 1944
- The Scarlet Button, 1944 (aka Murder is Cheap)
- Don't Open the Door, 1945 (aka Death Lifts the Latch)
- The Black Stage, 1945 (aka Murder Cheats the Bride)
- The Spinster's Secret, 1946 (aka By Hook or By Crook)
- Death in the Wrong Room, 1947
- Die in the Dark, 1947 (aka The Missing Widow)
- Lift Up the Lid, 1948 (aka The Innocent Bottle)
- Death Knocks Three Times, 1949
- Murder Comes Home, 1950
- A Nice Cup of Tea, 1950 (aka The Wrong Body)
- Lady Killer, 1951
- Miss Pinnegar Disappears, 1952 (aka A Case for Mr Crook)
- Footsteps Behind Me, 1953 (aka Black Death)
- Snake in the Grass, 1954 (aka Death Won't Wait)
- Is She Dead Too?, 1955 (aka A Question of Murder)
- And Death Came Too, 1956
- Riddle of the Lady, 1956
- Give Me a Name, 1957
- Death Against the Clock, 1958
- Third Crime Lucky, 1959 (aka Prelude to Murder)
- Death Takes a Wife, 1959 (aka Death Casts a Long Shadow)
- Out for the Kill, 1960
- She Shall Die, 1961 (aka After the Verdict)
- Uncertain Death, 1962
- No Dust in the Attic, 1962
- Ring for a Noose, 1963
- The Fingerprint, 1964
- Knock, Knock, Who's There, 1964 (aka The Voice)
- Passenger to Nowhere, 1965
- The Looking Glass Murder, 1966
- The Visitor, 1967
- Night Encounter, 1968 (aka Murder Anonymous)
- Missing From Her Home, 1969
- Death Wears a Mask, 1970 (aka Mr Crook Lifts the Mask)
- Tenant for the Tomb, 1991
- Murder's A Waiting Game, 1972
- A Nice Little Killing, 1974

Novels as Anne Meredith

- Portrait of a Murderer : a Christmas crime story, 1933, reissued 2017
- The Coward, 1934
- The Gambler, 1937
- The Showman, 1938
- The Stranger, 1939
- The Adventurer, 1940
- There's Always Tomorrow, 1941 (aka Home is the Heart)
- The Family Man, 1942
- Curtain, Mr Greatheart, 1943
- The Beautiful Miss Burroughes, 1945
- The Rich Woman, 1947
- The Sisters, 1948
- The Draper of Edgecumbe, 1950
- A Fig for Virtue, 1951
- Call Back Yesterday, 1952
- The Innocent Bride, 1954
- The Day of the Miracle, 1955
- Impetuous Heart, 1956)
- Christine, 1957
- A Man in the Family, 1959
- The Wise Child, 1960
- Up Goes the Donkey, 1962

Autobiography, as Anne Meredith

- Three-a-Penny, 1940, reissued 2019

Short Stories as Anthony Gilbert

- A Cavalier in Love. Table Talk, 15 July 1937
- The Letter. West Australian, 29 June 1940
- You Can't Hang Twice. Ellery Queen's Mystery Magazine, November 1946
- Remember Madame Clementine. Ellery Queen's Mystery Magazine, October 1955
- Once is Once Too Many. Ellery Queen's Mystery Magazine, December 1955
- The Goldfish Button. Ellery Queen's Mystery Magazine, February 1958
- The Eternal Chase. Ellery Queen's Mystery Magazine, August 1965
- Sleep is the Enemy. Ellery Queen's Mystery Magazine, February 1966
- The Dove and the Hawk. Ellery Queen's Mystery Magazine, June 1966
- Cat Among the Pigeons. Ellery Queen's Mystery Magazine, October 1966
- The Intruders. Ellery Queen's Mystery Magazine, December 1967
- Point of No Return. Ellery Queen's Mystery Magazine, May 1968
- Who Cares About an Old Woman. Ellery Queen's Mystery Magazine, October 1968
- The Puzzled Heart. Ellery Queen's Mystery Magazine, March 1969
- The Mills of God. Ellery Queen's Mystery Magazine, April 1969
- The Quiet Man. Ellery Queen's Mystery Magazine, June 1969
- Tiger on the Premises. Ellery Queen's Mystery Magazine, September 1969
- The Funeral of Dendy Watt. Ellery Queen's Mystery Magazine, January 1970
- Door to a Different World. Ellery Queen's Mystery Magazine, March 1970
- When Sun's Collide. Ellery Queen's Mystery Magazine, April 1971
- A Day of Encounters. Ellery Queen's Mystery Magazine, February 1972
- Fifty Years After. Ellery Queen's Mystery Magazine, March 1973
- The Invisible Witness. Ellery Queen's Mystery Magazine, January 1974

Radio Plays as Anthony Gilbert

- Death at 6.30. (Detection Club, Series 1, Episode 1). BBC Home Service, 11 and 15 May 1940
- The Honest Man. BBC Forces, 30 November 1940
- The Plain Woman. BBC Forces, 14 December 1940
- A Cavalier in Love. BBC Forces, 21 December 1940. Adapted from the short story
- He Came by Night. BBC Forces, 12 March 1941. Repeated: BBC General Forces, 27 July 1944
- Calling Mr Brown. BBC Forces, 21 April 1941
- The Bird of Passage. BBC Forces, 22 May 1941
- There's Always Tomorrow. BBC Forces, 12 June 1941
- Footprints. BBC Home Service, 2 July 1941. Repeated: BBC Home Service, 16 February 1949
- Thirty Years is a Long Time. BBC Home Service, 13 August 1941. Repeated: BBC General Forces, 2 April 1944
- The Challenge. BBC Forces, 20 March 1942
- A Bird in a Cage. BBC Forces, 27 March 1942
- The Organiser. BBC Forces, 3 April 1942
- The Ghost of Starling Square. BBC Forces, 10 April 1942
- Find the Lady. BBC Home Service, 9 November 1942. Adapted from the novel Woman in Red
- His Professional Conscience. BBC Home Service, 1 January 1943
- The Sullivan Case. (Here's Wishing You Well Again: Series 2, Episode 2). BBC General Forces, 27 January 1944
- The Fellowes Case. (Here's Wishing You Well Again: Series 2, Episode 5). BBC General Forces, 9 March 1944
- The Waterbury Case. (Here's Wishing You Well Again: Series 2, Episode 8). BBC General Forces, 20 April 1944
- The Homecoming. BBC General Forces, 22 June 1944.
- Of Brides in Baths. (Corner in Crime). BBC Home Service, 16 August 1945
- Mystery Man of New York. (Corner in Crime). BBC Home Service, 20 September 1945
- On the Night of October Tenth. BBC Home Service, 20 March 1946
- Full Circle. BBC Home Service, 18 September 1946
- Hard Luck Story. BBC Light Service, 20 May 1947
- A Nice Cup of Tea. (Detection Club: Series 2, Episode 1). BBC Light Service, 3 February 1948
- The Sympathetic Table. (Mystery Playhouse). BBC Light Service, 11 May 1948
- Profitable Death. BBC Home Service, 17 May 1950
- After the Verdict. BBC Home Service, 7 June 1952
- Now You Can Sleep. BBC Home Service, 23 August 1952
- My Guess Would be Murder. BBC Home Service, 30 October 1954. Adapted from the novel A Nice Cup of Tea
- I Love My Love with an A. BBC Home Service, 10 July 1957
- No One Will Ever Know. BBC Home Service, 20 February 1960
- Black Death. BBC Home Service, 16 July 1960. Adapted from the novel qv
- And Death Came Too. BBC Home Service, 3 March 1962. Adapted from the novel qv

Radio Plays as Anne Meredith

- The Adventurer. BBC Home Service, 29 March 1941
- The Rich Woman. BBC Home Service, 9 July 1943
- The Innocent Bride. BBC Home Service, 18 January 1953
- The Sisters. BBC Home Service, 12 October 1955
