= Murder by Experts =

1936 novel

- First edition (UK)
- Author: Anthony Gilbert
- Language: English
- Series: Arthur Crook
- Genre: Mystery thriller
- Publisher: Collins Crime Club (UK); Dial Press (US)
- Publication date: 1936
- Publication place: United Kingdom
- Media type: Print
- Followed by: The Man Who Wasn't There

Murder by Experts is a 1936 mystery thriller novel by the British writer Anthony Gilbert, the pen name of Lucy Beatrice Malleson. It launched her long-running series featuring the shady London lawyer and detective Arthur Crook. Although she had been writing since 1926 this was her first major popular success. The plot revolves around collectors of Chinese antiques.

== Bibliography ==
- Magill, Frank Northen . Critical Survey of Mystery and Detective Fiction: Authors, Volume 2. Salem Press, 1988.
- Reilly, John M. Twentieth Century Crime & Mystery Writers. Springer, 2015.
