= Gentleman detective =

Type of fictional character

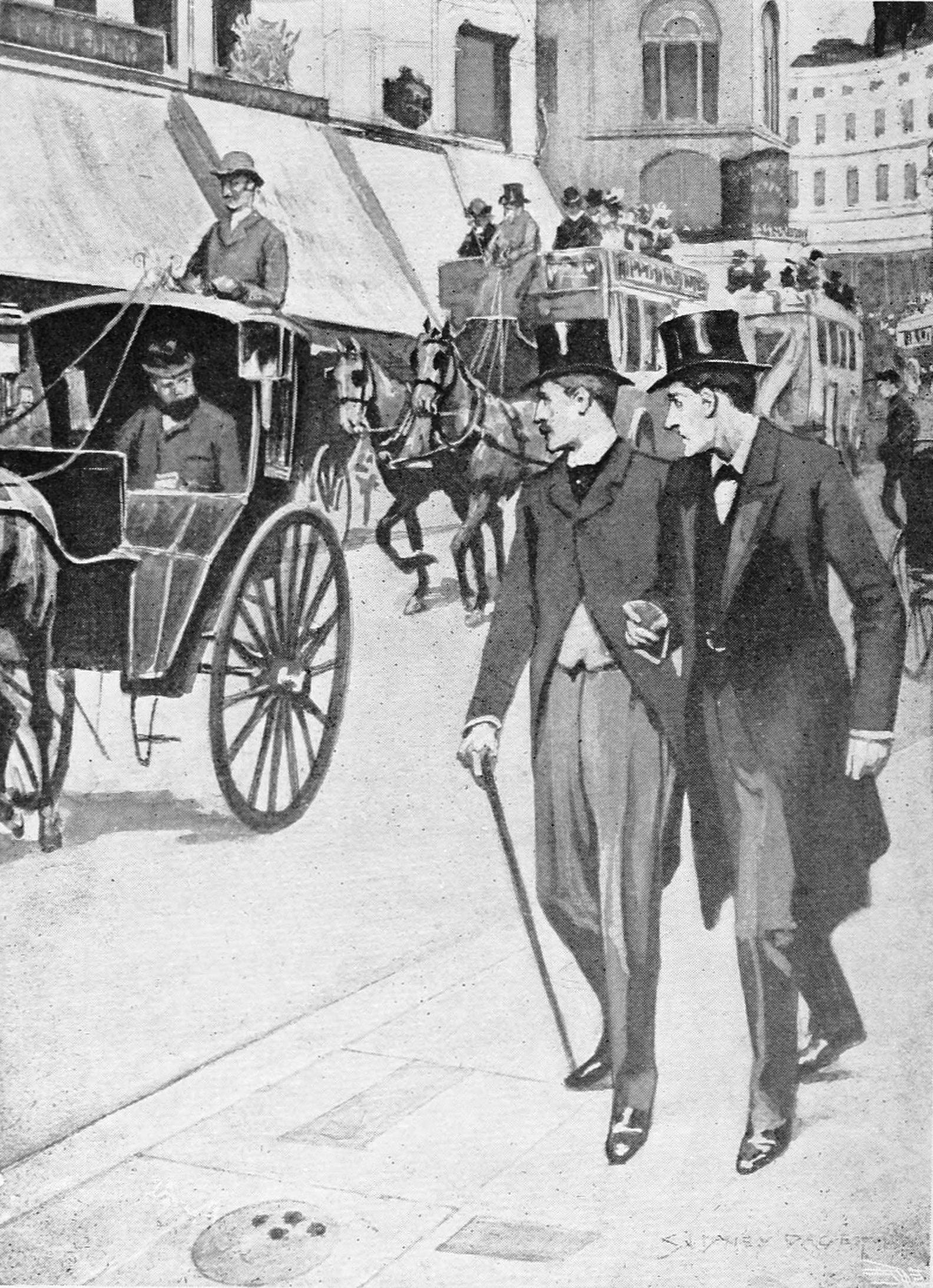
Sherlock Holmes (right) and Dr Watson, by Sidney Paget (1901)

The gentleman detective is a type of fictional character that has long been a staple of crime fiction, particularly in detective novels and short stories set in the United Kingdom in the Golden Age. While not necessarily aristocracy, the heroes of these adventures are often members of the British gentry or gentlemen by conduct. They are sometimes contrasted with professional police force detectives from the working classes.

Gentleman detectives include amateurs, private detectives and professional policemen. They are always well educated, frequently have unusual or eccentric hobbies, and are commonly found in their natural environment, an English country house. This archetype of British detective contrasts with the more "hardboiled" counterpart in American crime fiction.

== Early examples ==
Gentlemen detectives appeared early in modern detective fiction, which began in the late 19th century.

C. Auguste Dupin, created by Edgar Allan Poe, is widely considered to be the first fictional detective in English literature. He appeared in three short stories written in the 1840s: "The Murders in the Rue Morgue" (1841), "The Mystery of Marie Rogêt" (1842) and "The Purloined Letter" (1844).

Poe created Dupin before the word detective had been coined, but began many common elements of detective fiction: Dupin shares some features with the later gentleman detective. He was "…the first fictional detective of importance and the model for virtually every cerebral crime solver who followed." More specifically, Dorothy L. Sayers noted that "Sherlock Holmes modelled himself to a large extent upon (Poe's) Dupin, substituting cocaine for candlelight, with accompaniments of shag and fiddle-playing."

Dupin is French, not English, but is probably a gentleman. He comes from a once wealthy family but has been reduced "by a variety of untoward events" to more humble circumstances. He is entirely amateur and contents himself only with the basic necessities of life. He lives in Paris with his close friend, the anonymous narrator of the stories. Like the much later Lord Peter Wimsey (see below), Dupin is a bibliophile, and met his narrator friend while both were searching for "the same rare and very remarkable volume" in an obscure library. For hobbies, Dupin is "fond" of enigmas, conundrums, and hieroglyphics. Dupin also bears the French title Chevalier, meaning that he is a knight in the Légion d'honneur.

The classic British gentleman detective appears soon after Poe's Dupin. A gentleman amateur is the ultimate hero of The Moonstone (1868), a famous epistolary novel widely considered the first true detective novel in English. Its author, Wilkie Collins was a lawyer, and a close friend of Charles Dickens. Collins also used gifted amateurs in his earlier mystery novel, The Woman in White (1859).

In The Moonstone, Rachel Verinder is the only child of a rich, aristocratic widow. On her eighteenth birthday, she is bequeathed an enormous diamond; that night, this 'moonstone' is stolen from the country house of her mother, Lady Verinder. After local police are baffled, a Bow Street Runner called Sergeant Cuff is called in. Sergeant Cuff is honourable and skilful, but he is not a gentleman, and is unable to break Rachel's reticence about what is clearly an inside job.

The mystery is eventually solved by Franklin Blake, who is a gifted amateur—and definitely a member of the gentry. The social difference between Collins' two detectives is nicely shown by their relationships with the Verinder family: Sergeant Cuff becomes a great friend of Lady Verinder's steward (chief servant), whereas Franklin Blake eventually marries Rachel, her daughter.

=== Sherlock Holmes ===
The most famous of all fictional detectives, Sherlock Holmes, may also be considered a gentleman, at least by background. Holmes was the creation of Scottish author and physician Sir Arthur Conan Doyle. He appeared in four novels and fifty-six short stories, all but four stories narrated by his associate, the notable Dr Watson. These works cover in fiction a period from around 1878 up to 1907, with a final case in 1914. Both characters also appear in many pastiches.

Holmes is a brilliant London-based and self-styled consulting detective. In their debut (the 1887 novel, A Study in Scarlet), he tells Watson that this occupation is unique (which at that date it was). As a retired army doctor, Dr Watson is far closer to the stereotypic English gentleman than Holmes, yet has no social reservations about beginning his long association with the detective. In the best traditions of the gentry, Holmes proves to be physically brave, and competent with fists, sword and pistol. Like the earlier Dupin and the later Lord Peter Wimsey (see below), Holmes is also a competent cryptanalyst (for instance, The Dancing Men, 1903).

Conan Doyle never gave much background about Holmes' family, but his hero was apparently born in 1854 (estimated from His Last Bow, 1917). He also has an eccentric older brother, Mycroft Holmes, a senior public servant and member of the Diogenes Club. As further indirect evidence that Holmes is an educated gentleman, Conan Doyle indicates that Holmes is fluent in Latin (A Study in Scarlet, 1887), and as the series continues his speech is replete with references to the Bible, Shakespeare, and even Goethe. Holmes had earlier attended university, where he began his detecting as an amateur (The Gloria Scott, 1893, and The Musgrave Ritual, 1893). A violinist himself, Holmes loves music (The Red-Headed League, 1890), sometimes to the point of eccentricity; in The Bruce-Partington Plans (1912), Watson reports that "Holmes lost himself in a monograph which he had undertaken upon the Polyphonic Motets of Lassus."

Holmes and Watson were often depicted wearing traditional gentleman's attire in illustrations set in London by Sidney Paget, whose illustrations accompanied Sherlock Holmes stories in The Strand Magazine. While Paget is credited with depicting Holmes wearing a deerstalker hat and Inverness cape, Paget only depicted Holmes wearing these garments in situations that would have been considered appropriate at the time, such as when Holmes was working in a rural setting or travelling to the countryside.

== Golden Age examples ==
The renowned crime writers of the Golden Age of Detective Fiction were mostly British and mostly women, including the four "Queens of Crime" (Margery Allingham, Agatha Christie, Ngaio Marsh and Dorothy L. Sayers). They all produced at least one gentleman detective. Their books featuring these characters are still generally in print.

- Hercule Poirot first appeared in 1920, in Agatha Christie's first book, The Mysterious Affair at Styles. He was immensely popular during the "Golden Age", becoming the most famous detective since Sherlock Holmes. He appeared in 33 novels, one play, and more than 50 short stories published between 1920 and 1975 and set in the same era. Poirot was formerly Chief of Police of Brussels, until "the Great War" (WWI) forced him to leave for England. It was there that he met his longtime friend Arthur Hastings, who accompanied him on many cases. Throughout his career, he solved many cases across Europe, occasionally undertaking cases for the British government and Secret Service, including foiling the attempted abduction of the British Prime Minister. Poirot operates as a fairly conventional detective, depending on logic, which is represented by two common phrases he uses: his use of "the little grey cells" and "order and method". Poirot is occasionally assisted by his secretary, Miss Felicity Lemon, and friend Chief Inspector Japp, of Scotland Yard. Poirot's appearance is of a short, dignified man. His head is exactly the shape of an egg, with a stiff and military-like moustache. His attire consists of a three-piece suit, accompanied by a pocketwatch, spats, patent leather shoes and a pair of pince-nez. He also wears a "Tussie-mussie" lapel pin he received as a gift in The Mysterious Affair at Styles.
- Lord Peter Wimsey was the creation of Dorothy L. Sayers. Wimsey is an archetype for British gentlemen detectives. Reputedly born in 1890, he first appeared in Whose Body? (1923), the first of 11 chronological novels and several collections of short stories. Wimsey is a purely amateur sleuth, and is unquestionably an English gentleman. He is polished, aristocratic, wealthy, and the younger brother of a duke. Wimsey is extremely clever, though he usually tries to hide it. As shown in Have His Carcase (1932), Wimsey is a competent cryptanalyst, like both the earlier Dupin and Sherlock Holmes. Again like Holmes, Wimsey is physically brave (despite being physically small), and is competent with his fists (Clouds of Witness, 1926). Wimsey is notably eccentric in manner; this is most evident in the first five novels. As Sayers' work progress and as Wimsey ages, he rounds out and mellows greatly. At age 45 he marries Harriet Vane, a crime writer. According to Barbara Reynolds, her friend and biographer, Sayers remarked that Lord Peter began as a mixture of Fred Astaire and Bertie Wooster. She claimed that she had developed the "husky voiced, dark-eyed" Harriet to put an end to Lord Peter via matrimony. Vane features in two further novels (Have His Carcase, 1932, & Gaudy Night, 1935) before agreeing to marry Wimsey. In the course of writing these novels, Sayers gave Lord Peter and Harriet so much life that she was never able to, as she put it, "see Lord Peter exit the stage." In an essay by one of her "Golden Age" rivals, Ngaio Marsh (see below), Sayers is accused of having "fallen in love" with Wimsey.
- Albert Campion first appeared in 1929, and was created by Margery Allingham as a parody of Lord Peter Wimsey. Albert Campion is supposedly the pseudonym used by a man who was born in 1900 into a prominent British aristocratic family. He was educated at Totham School and the (fictitious) St. Ignatius' College, Cambridge (according to a mini-biography included in Sweet Danger, 1933). Ingenious, resourceful and well-educated, in his 20s he assumed the name Campion and began a life as an adventurer and detective. As Allingham's work progressed, Campion established his own identity. He first appeared as a supporting character in The Crime at Black Dudley (1929), an adventure story involving a ring of criminals, and would go on to feature in another 17 novels and over 20 short stories.
- Roderick Alleyn first appeared in 1934, the creation of New Zealander, Ngaio Marsh, who was then living in London. Alleyn featured in a chronological series of 32 detective novels, which finished as late as 1982. He was apparently born around 1893, schooled at Eton, graduated from Oxford around 1915, served in the army for three years in the First World War, then spent a year (1919–1920) in the British Foreign Service. He finally joined the Metropolitan Police as a constable in about 1920 or 1921. When the series opens, Alleyn is aged about 40 and is already a Chief Detective-Inspector in the CID at Scotland Yard. As the series progresses, Alleyn marries and has a son, and eventually rises to the rank of Chief Superintendent. Alleyn is a thoroughly professional policeman, but socially is very like Wimsey. Both were reputedly educated at Eton and Oxford (being only three or so years apart, they perhaps should have known each other). Both detectives eventually marry a former murder suspect and have children. As depicted by Marsh, Alleyn's family is similar to that created by Sayers for her Wimsey, in that Alleyn has a titled older brother, who however is much less grand (merely a baronet rather than a duke). Like Wimsey, Alleyn's titled brother is less intelligent and more conventional than his more famous younger sibling. Alleyn's mother, Lady Alleyn, closely resembles in manner Wimsey's mother, the Dowager Duchess of Denver. Both ladies are affable, intelligent, and strongly support (and perhaps prefer) their younger sons. One marked difference between the fictional biographies of Alleyn and Wimsey, who are about the same age, is in their supposed military service during the First World War. Alleyn's army service is glossed over and never discussed, whereas Wimsey's distinguished service on the Western Front has mentally scarred him for life. Another difference is that Wimsey deliberately cultivates his aristocratic eccentricities (inter alia, he wears a monocle, delights in his Oxford accent, and collects incunabula), whereas Alleyn is not at all eccentric, and plays down his upper-class background.
- Miss Marple is one of the two great detective creations of Agatha Christie, the best known of all the "Golden Age" writers. Miss Marple is an amiable elderly spinster who first appeared in 1927. Her detective feats are largely based on her profound knowledge of human nature, gained (she maintains) from closely observing life in her small village. The daughter of a clergyman, she is not from the aristocracy or landed gentry, but is quite at home amongst them. Miss Marple would probably have been happy to describe herself as a gentlewoman. Christie had a rather upper-class background herself: she grew up in a large house with servants, with a father rich enough not to work, a private education, and many country house parties before World War 1. In her autobiography, Christie stated that she partly based Miss Marple upon her grandmother and her friends.
- Mr. Satterthwaite is one of Christie's lesser known amateur detectives. This charming, elderly gentleman only appears in The Mysterious Mr. Quin (1930) and Three Act Tragedy (1934). He is physically small, highly cultivated, an inveterate snob with a taste for duchesses, and is wealthy besides. By way of contrast, Christie's most famous detective character (Hercule Poirot) is a foreigner, and is thus outside the English class system. Poirot takes full advantage of this subtlety, not least in Three Act Tragedy in which he catches a serial killer with Mr. Satterthwaite's assistance.
- Arsène Lupin, the French "gentleman thief" who debuted in 1905, may just as well be considered a gentleman detective.

== Modern examples ==
Several modern day fictional characters may be considered examples of gentlemen detectives. Like Alleyn but unlike earlier gifted amateurs such as Wimsey, Campion or Miss Marple, several modern "gentleman detectives" are professional policemen.

Adam Dalgliesh, the creation of P. D. James, first appeared in 1962. He flourishes in the Metropolitan Police, despite being definitely gentry where such a background may be a disadvantage. Like the earlier Miss Marple, Dalgliesh is the child of an Anglican clergyman. He is somewhat of a recluse and, more eccentrically, a successful poet. His colleague John Massingham is the son of a peer, Lord Dungannon.

Cormoran Strike, the main character in a series of detective novels written by British author J. K. Rowling, published under the pseudonym Robert Galbraith from 2013 on, and the novels' BBC television adaptations. A private detective, Strike had a bohemian upbringing as the bastard child of a rock and roll superstar and a groupie, and is a veteran Royal Military Police Special Investigation Branch investigator. However, he was educated at Oxford (though he left without taking a degree) and has a series of affairs with aristocratic or wealthy women.

Inspector Morse, the subject of works by Colin Dexter, first appeared in 1975. He works in Oxford and is (or was) upwardly mobile: he won a scholarship to Oxford but subsequently failed. Like Alleyn and Wimsey, Morse served in the British army before joining the police, but unlike them, he served not as a commissioned officer in a prestigious regiment but as a non-commissioned officer in the Royal Military Police. Morse's snobbery is intellectual rather than a question of breeding or social advantage.

Detective Inspector Lynley, first introduced in 1988, is another truly aristocratic member of the Police, being an Earl. Much of the plot of the novels by Elizabeth George revolve around his working relationship with Detective Sergeant Barbara Havers, who is of lower-class origins. Both show greater loyalty to each other than to official regulations and accepted attitudes to their relative stations, and both are capable of self-sacrificing actions of noblesse oblige.

Carmen Isabella Sandiego, the "World's Greatest Thief", was first introduced in 1985. She was originally ACME Crimenet's most intelligent and eminent lady detective with a exemplary record in solved cases. Later, she changed careers as a lady thief and became spymaster and CEO of V.I.L.E..

Professor Layton from the video game series named after him. He first appeared in 2007. He is a professor of archaeology who solves various puzzles with his young apprentice Luke Triton.

Goro Akechi from the Atlus video game series Persona. Akechi is known as the Detective Prince of Tokyo who seems to solve various crimes and is adored whenever he shows up on TV. In 5, he's referred to as the second coming of the detective prince, a reference to Naoto Shirogane from 4.

Detective Inspector Alexandra "Alex" Drake (née Price), the well-bred, posh protagonist of Ashes to Ashes (2007–2009, mentioned in Life on Mars in 2006). DI Drake, the orphaned daughter of a solicitor and barrister, was reared from adolescence by her parents' associate after she witnessed their violent deaths and narrowly avoiding being killed with them. She attended good schools and studied psychology before joining the Metropolitan Police and fast-tracking up the ranks. A gunshot to her head in 2007 sends her back in time to 1981, three months before her parents' murders, and places her in the company of comparatively Neanderthal detectives who had transplanted themselves from the North a year earlier.

Detective Sergeant Makepeace, Lady Harriet "Harry" Makepeace, one of the two eponymous characters of Dempsey and Makepeace (1985–1988). The well-schooled daughter of Lord Winfield, Lady Harriet is assigned as an armed detective sergeant in the Metropolitan Police's [fictional] specialised task force, SI 10, and finds herself partnered with (and subordinate to) working-class NYPD Lieutenant James Dempsey who is on extended loan to the Met.

Benoit Blanc, a detective depicted in the film Knives Out and its sequel Glass Onion, described by one of the film's characters as "The last of the gentlemen sleuths." He has a characteristic southern accent, and uses a unique technique of interpreting information he calls Gravity's Rainbow to solve crimes. Despite not being British, encompasses all the characteristics of the traditional gentleman detective.

Skulduggery Pleasant, a real gentleman detective and one of the main characters of the book series of the same name. He has an interesting look, considering that he is a skeleton, which he takes full advantage of. With his partner Valkyrie Cain and some magic, Skulduggery solves world-shattering crimes.

== See also ==
- Crime fiction
- Detective fiction
- Gentleman thief
- List of fictional detectives
