= 1942 in literature =

This article contains information about the literary events and publications of 1942.

== Events ==
- January 1 – The U.K. Book Production War Economy Agreement comes into force.
- February 20 – Jean Bruller's novella Le Silence de la mer (Silence of the Sea), about resistance to the Nazi occupation of France, is issued clandestinely as the first publication of Les Éditions de Minuit in Paris, under the pseudonym "Vercors". A hundred copies are distributed from late summer; the rest are destroyed by the occupying authorities.
- February 22 – The Austrian-born novelist Stefan Zweig and his second wife Lotte Altmann (Zweig's former secretary) are found dead of a barbiturate overdose in their home in Petrópolis, Brazil, leaving notes indicating despair at the future of European civilization. The manuscript of Zweig's autobiography The World of Yesterday, posted to his publisher a day earlier, is first published in Stockholm later in the year as Die Welt von Gestern.

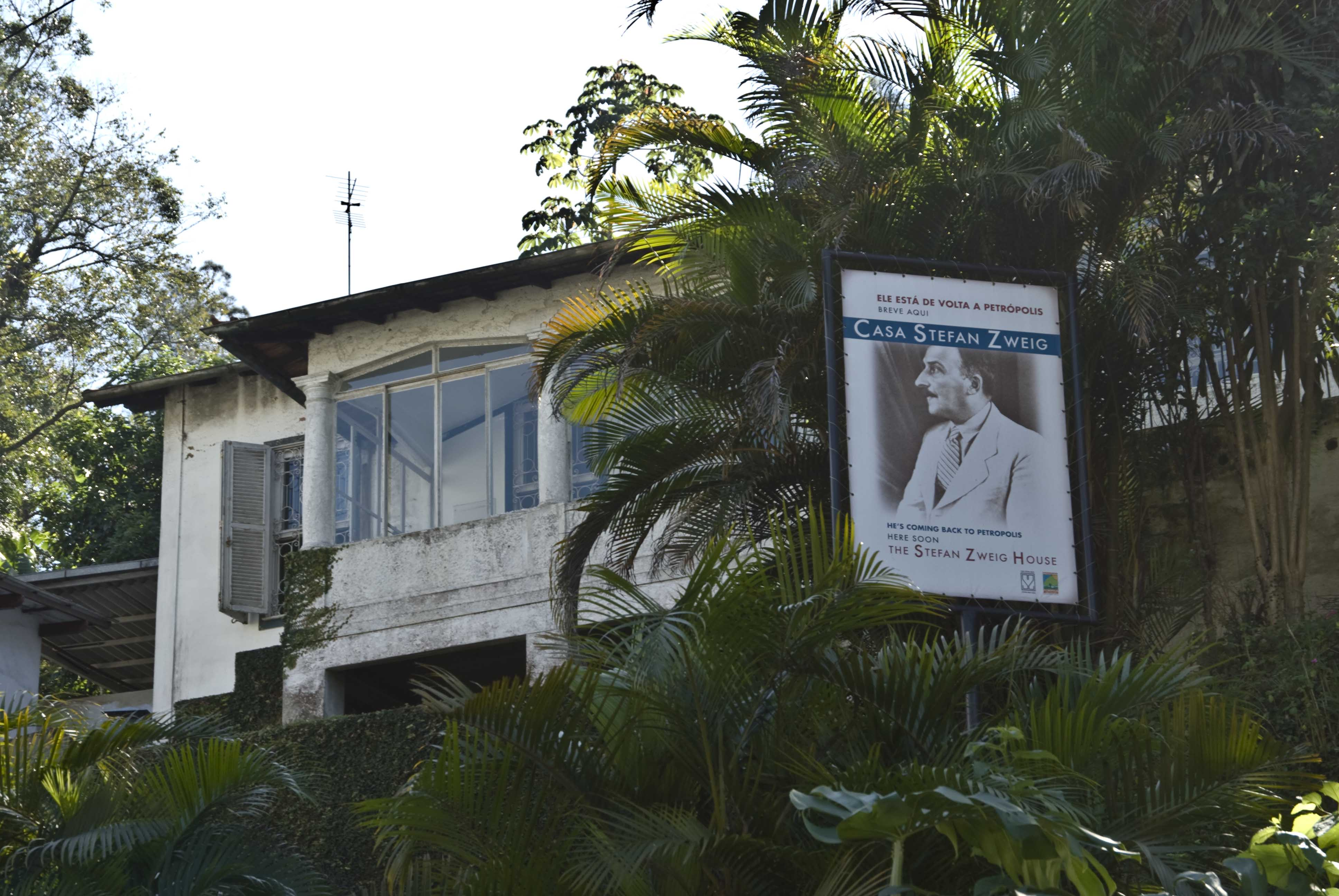
The house of Stefan Zweig in Petropolis

- March – Isaac Asimov's Three Laws of Robotics are introduced in his short story "Runaround", published in Astounding Science-Fiction.
- March 1 – The Canadian novelist Robertson Davies begins a 13-year spell as editor of the Peterborough Examiner in Ontario.
- March 28 – The Spanish poet Miguel Hernández dies of tuberculosis as a political prisoner in a prison hospital, having scrawled his last verse on the wall.
- April 29 – The newspaper Asia Raja is first published in the Dutch East Indies under Japanese occupation; it will publish a number of literary works.
- May – The German novelist Thomas Mann moves to California.
- May 4 – The French novelist André Gide moves to Tunis.
- May 8 – The English novelist David Garnett marries as his second wife, the painter and writer Angelica Bell, daughter of Garnett's lover Duncan Grant and Vanessa Bell.
- June 4 – The film Mrs. Miniver is released, for which the novelist James Hilton will share an Academy Award for Best Writing (Adapted Screenplay) on 4 March 1943.
- June 12 – Anne Frank, on her 13th birthday, makes the first entry in her new diary in Nazi-occupied Amsterdam.
- August – The French Resistance unit to which expatriate Irish writer Samuel Beckett belongs is betrayed. He has to flee from occupied Paris on foot to Roussillon, Vaucluse in south-eastern France, where he continues work on his novel Watt.
- August 9 – The New York Times launches the national version of its influential New York Times Best Seller list.
- August 28 – Polish writer Zofia Kossak-Szczucka, as head of the underground organization Front for the Rebirth of Poland, publishes in Warsaw her Protest! leaflet against the mass murder of Jews in German-occupied Poland.
- Autumn – Vasily Grossman attends the Battle of Stalingrad as a reporter for the Soviet Army newspaper Krasnaya Zvezda. The experience later governs his novels Stalingrad («Сталингра́д», original Russian publication 1952) and Life and Fate («Жизнь и судьба», completed 1959).
- October – The English poet Keith Douglas takes part in the Second Battle of El Alamein, against orders.
- November 19 – The Polish Jewish writer and artist Bruno Schulz is shot dead by a Gestapo officer, while walking through the "Aryan quarter" of his home town, Drohobych.

== New books ==
=== Fiction ===
- Samuel Hopkins Adams – The Harvey Girls
- Martha Albrand – No Surrender
- Nelson Algren – Never Come Morning
- Charlotte Armstrong – Lay On, Mac Duff!
- Nigel Balchin – Darkness Falls from the Air
- John Brophy – Immortal Sergeant
- John Bude – Death Knows No Calendar
- Albert Camus – The Stranger (L'Étranger)
- John Dickson Carr
  - The Emperor's Snuff-Box
  - The Gilded Man (as by Carter Dickson)
- Camilo José Cela – The Family of Pascual Duarte (La Familia de Pascual Duarte)
- Raymond Chandler – The High Window
- Peter Cheyney
  - Dark Duet
  - Never a Dull Moment
  - Sorry You've Been Troubled
- Agatha Christie
  - The Body in the Library
  - Five Little Pigs
  - The Moving Finger (US publication)
- G. D. H. Cole and Margaret Cole – Toper's End
- J. J. Connington – No Past Is Dead
- James Gould Cozzens – The Just and the Unjust
- John Creasey – The Toff Goes to Market
- Freeman Wills Crofts – Fear Comes to Chalfont
- Lloyd C. Douglas – The Robe
- Rachel Field – And Now Tomorrow
- R. Austin Freeman – The Jacob Street Mystery
- Anthony Gilbert – Something Nasty in the Woodshed
- Natalia Ginzburg (as Alessandra Tornimparte) – La strada che va in città (The Road to the city)
- James Gunn – Deadlier Than the Male
- Cyril Hare – Tragedy at Law
- Robert A. Heinlein – Beyond This Horizon
- Robert Hichens – A New Way of Life
- Anne Hocking – One Shall Be Taken
- Michael Innes – The Daffodil Affair
- Kalki Krishnamurthy
  - Magudapathi
  - Parthiban Kanavu (பார்த்திபன் கனவு, Parthiban's Dream)
- Maura Laverty – Never No More
- C. S. Lewis – The Screwtape Letters (Christian apologetics)
- E. C. R. Lorac
  - Rope's End, Rogue's End
  - The Sixteenth Stair
- Mary McCarthy – The Company She Keeps
- Sándor Márai – Embers (A gyertyák csonkig égnek)
- Gladys Mitchell – Laurels Are Poison
- David Leslie Murray – Enter Three Witches
- J. B. Priestley – Blackout in Gretley
- Ellery Queen – Calamity Town
- Raymond Queneau – Pierrot mon ami
- Clayton Rawson – No Coffin for the Corpse
- G. Herbert Sallans – Little Man
- Anna Seghers – The Seventh Cross (Das siebte Kreuz)
- Nevil Shute – Pied Piper
- Georges Simenon – Young Cardinaud
- Curt Siodmak – Donovan's Brain
- Clark Ashton Smith – Out of Space and Time
- Eleanor Smith
  - Caravan
  - The Man in Grey
- John Steinbeck – The Moon is Down
- Rex Stout – Black Orchids
- Cecil Street
  - The Fourth Bomb
  - Night Exercise
  - This Undesirable Residence
- Antal Szerb (as A. H. Redcliff) – Oliver VII (VII. Olivér)
- Tomita Tsuneo (富田常雄) – Sanshiro Sugata (姿三四郎)
- Vercors – Le Silence de la mer
- Hugh Walpole (died 1941) – The Killer and the Slain
- Evelyn Waugh – Put Out More Flags
- Franz Werfel – The Song of Bernadette
- Ethel Lina White – Midnight House
- Wu Cheng'en (吳承恩), translated by Arthur Waley – Monkey (15th century)
- Xiao Hong (蕭紅) – Hulanhe zhuan (呼兰河传, Tales of the Hulan River)
- Francis Brett Young – A Man About the House

=== Children and young people ===
- BB (Denys Watkins-Pitchford) – The Little Grey Men
- Enid Blyton
  - Five on a Treasure Island
  - Mary Mouse and the Doll's House
- Eleanor Estes – The Middle Moffat
- Janette Sebring Lowrey – The Poky Little Puppy
- Diana Ross – The Little Red Engine Gets a Name (first in the Little Red Engine series of nine books)
- Solomon Simon – Di Helden fun Khelm (The Heroes of Chełm)
- Elizabeth Gray Vining (as Elizabeth Janet Gray) – Adam of the Road
- Ursula Moray Williams – Gobbolino, the Witch's Cat

=== Drama ===
- Jacinto Benavente – La honradez de la cerradura
- Paul Vincent Carroll – The Strings Are False
- Constance Cox – The Romance of David Garrick
- Henry de Montherlant – La Reine morte
- Maurice Druon – Mégarée
- Patrick Hastings – Escort
- Arthur Miller – Thunder from the Hills (radio play)
- Kaj Munk – Niels Ebbesen
- Eugene O'Neill – A Touch of the Poet (written)
- Terence Rattigan – Flare Path
- John Van Druten – The Damask Cheek

=== Poetry ===
- Morwenna Donnelly – Beauty and Ashes
- T. S. Eliot – Little Gidding
- Patrick Kavanagh – The Great Hunger
- Saint-John Perse – Exil

=== Non-fiction ===
- Elizabeth Bowen – Bowen's Court
- Albert Camus – The Myth of Sisyphus (Le Mythe de Sisyphe)
- Salvador Dalí – The Secret Life of Salvador Dalí
- Edith Hamilton – Mythology
- Richard Hillary – The Last Enemy
- Aldous Huxley – The Art of Seeing
- Beryl Markham – West with the Night
- C. S. Lewis – A Preface to Paradise Lost
- Elliot Paul – The Last Time I Saw Paris
- Adam Clayton Powell, Sr. – Picketing Hell
- Radu D. Rosetti – Odinioară
- Antoine de Saint-Exupéry – Flight to Arras
- Rebecca West – Black Lamb and Grey Falcon

== Births ==
- January 7
  - Terenci Moix, Spanish writer (died 2003)
  - Božin Pavlovski, Macedonian-Australian author
- January 9 – Enrique Estrázulas, Uruguayan writer, poet, essayist, playwright, journalist and diplomat (died 2016)
- January 19 – Paul-Eerik Rummo, Estonian poet, playwright and politician
- January 31 – Derek Jarman, English film director, writer and diarist (died 1994)
- February 1 – Terry Jones, Welsh comedic actor and writer (died 2020)
- February – David Williamson, Australian playwright
- March 2 – John Irving, American novelist and screenwriter
- March 28 – Daniel Dennett, American philosopher, writer and cognitive scientist (died 2024)
- April 1 – Samuel R. Delany, American novelist, essayist and critic
- April 4 – Kitty Kelley, American biographer and journalist
- April 20 – Arto Paasilinna, Finnish novelist and journalist (died 2018)
- April 27 – Ruth Glick, American cookery author and novelist
- May 6 – Ariel Dorfman, Argentine/Chilean novelist, playwright and essayist
- May 11 – Rachel Billington, English author
- June 25 – Michel Tremblay, French Canadian novelist and playwright
- July 2 – Mukhtar Shakhanov, Kazakh writer, editor and lawmaker
- August 2 – Isabel Allende, Chilean novelist
- August 7 – Garrison Keillor, American humorous writer and broadcaster
- August 9 – David Steinberg, Canadian comedian, actor, writer, director, and author
- August 22 – Uğur Mumcu, Turkish journalist and writer (died 1993)
- September 1 – António Lobo Antunes, Portuguese novelist and psychiatrist (died 2026)
- September 14 – Bernard MacLaverty, Irish writer
- September 21 – Luis Mateo Díez, Spanish writer
- October 16 – Joseph Bruchac, Native American author
- October 20 – Bob Graham, Australian children's writer and illustrator
- October 23
  - Michael Crichton, American writer and director (died 2008)
  - Douglas Dunn, Scottish poet and scholar
- October 24 – Frank Delaney, Irish-born novelist, journalist and broadcaster (died 2017)
- November 7 – Helen Garner, Australian writer
- November 8 – Fernando Sorrentino, Argentine writer
- November 19 – Sharon Olds, American poet
- November 24 – Craig Thomas, Welsh novelist (died 2011)
- December 6 – Peter Handke, Nobel-winning Austrian novelist and playwright
- unknown date – Ghada al-Samman, Syrian writer

== Deaths ==
- January 8 – Chaudhry Afzal Haq, Indian writer and humanitarian (born 1891)
- January 14 – Porfirio Barba-Jacob, Colombian writer (born 1883)
- February 2 – Daniil Kharms, Russian poet, writer and dramatist (died in prison, born 1905)
- February 18 – Henri Stahl, Romanian historian, short story writer, memoirist and stenographer (born 1877)
- March 16 – Rachel Field, American author and poet (born 1894)
- March 26 – Carolyn Wells, American novelist and poet (born 1862)
- March 28 – Miguel Hernández, Spanish poet (died in prison, born 1910)
- April 24 – Lucy Maud Montgomery, Canadian novelist and children's writer (born 1874)
- May 11 – Sakutarō Hagiwara (萩原 朔太郎), Japanese poet (born 1886)
- May 20 – Nini Roll Anker, Norwegian novelist and playwright (born 1873)
- May 26 – Libero Bovio, Neapolitan dialect poet (born 1883)
- May 29 – Akiko Yosano (与謝野 晶子, Yosano Shiyo), Japanese poet and feminist (born 1878)
- May – Jakob van Hoddis (Hans Davidsohn) German poet (died in extermination camp, born 1887)
- June 30 – Léon Daudet, French writer and journalist (born 1867)
- July 1 – Peadar Toner Mac Fhionnlaoich, Irish writer in Irish (born 1857)
- July 23 – Nikola Vaptsarov (Никола Йонков Вапцаров), Bulgarian poet and resistance worker (executed, born 1909)
- August 17 – Irène Némirovsky, Russian-born French novelist (died in concentration camp, born 1903)
- August 27 – Lev Nussimbaum, Russian and Azerbaijani novelist (gangrene; born 1905)
- September 26 – Oskar Kraus, Czech philosopher (born 1872)
- October 14 – Cosmo Hamilton, English dramatist and novelist (born 1870)
- October 20 – Friedrich Münzer, German classicist (born 1868)
- October 29 – Màrius Torres, Catalan Spanish poet (born 1910)
- November 4
  - Eleanor Stackhouse Atkinson, American novelist and textbook and children's writer (born 1863)
  - Clementine Krämer, German poet and short-story writer (died in concentration camp, born 1873)
- December 23 – Konstantin Balmont, Russian Symbolist poet and translator (born 1867)

== Awards ==
- Carnegie Medal for children's literature: Denys Watkins-Pitchford, The Little Grey Men
- Frost Medal: Edgar Lee Masters
- James Tait Black Memorial Prize for fiction: Arthur Waley, Translation of Monkey by Wu Cheng'en
- James Tait Black Memorial Prize for biography: Lord Ponsonby of Shulbrede, Henry Ponsonby: Queen Victoria's Private Secretary
- Newbery Medal for children's literature: Walter D. Edmonds, The Matchlock Gun
- Nobel Prize in Literature: not awarded
- Pulitzer Prize for Drama: not awarded
- Pulitzer Prize for Poetry: William Rose Benet, The Dust Which Is God
- Pulitzer Prize for the Novel: Ellen Glasgow, In This Our Life
