= 1942 Governor General's Awards =

Canadian literary award

The 1942 Governor General's Awards for Literary Merit were the seventh rendition of the Governor General's Awards, Canada's annual national awards program which then comprised literary awards alone. The awards recognized Canadian writers for new English-language works published in Canada during 1942 and were presented in 1943. There were no cash prizes.

There were four awards in the three established categories, which recognized English-language works only. A second award for non-fiction was introduced, and two were conferred annually through the 1958 cycle, after which there were several changes for the 1959 Governor General's Awards under the new administrator Canada Council.

== Winners ==
- Fiction: G. Herbert Sallans, Little Man
- Poetry or drama: Earle Birney, David and Other Poems
- Non-fiction: Bruce Hutchison, The Unknown Country
- Non-fiction: Edgar McInnis, The Unguarded Frontier
