= Philip Child =

Canadian novelist, poet, and academic

Philip Albert Child
- Born: January 19, 1898; Hamilton, Ontario
- Died: February 6, 1978 (aged 80); Toronto, Ontario
- Education: Trinity College, Toronto (BA); Christ's College, Cambridge (BA); Harvard University (MA, PhD)
- Known for: Novelist, poet, and academic

Philip Albert Child (January 19, 1898 – February 6, 1978) was a Canadian novelist, poet, and academic.

Born in Hamilton, Ontario, the son of William Addison Child and Elizabeth Helen (Harvey) Child graduated from Ridley College, St. Catharines in 1915 and then studied at Trinity College where he received a Bachelor of Arts degree after serving during World War I. He received a Bachelor of Arts degree from Christ's College, Cambridge in 1921 and received a Master of Arts and Ph.D. from Harvard University. He was a journalist and taught for a time at the University of British Columbia while writing several novels. In 1942, he became a professor at Trinity College eventually becoming Chancellor's Professor of English.

He won the Ryerson Fiction Award twice, in 1945 for Day of Wrath and in 1949 for Mr. Ames Against Time. He also won the 1949 Governor General's Award for Mr. Ames Against Time.

== Selected works ==
- The Village of Souls (1933)
- God's Sparrows (1937)
- Day of Wrath (1945)
- Mr. Ames Against Time (1948)
- The Victorian House: And Other Poems (1951)
- Come Rack (1954)
- The Wood of the Nightingale (1965)
