= Jeann Beattie =

Canadian novelist and journalist

Jeann Beattie (May 21, 1922 – September 17, 2005) was a Canadian novelist and journalist. She was most noted for her 1950 novel Blaze of Noon, which won that year's Ryerson Fiction Award.

== Biography ==
Originally from St. Catharines, Ontario, Beattie began her career working as a clerical staffer for the St. Catharines Standard in 1940, before leaving in 1944 to study journalism at Columbia University. She was a writer for various Canadian newspapers and magazines, including Maclean's, and a television producer for CBC Television. She was particularly known for her advocacy journalism for fairer treatment of young people in the juvenile detention system, reflected in her 1971 non-fiction book And the Tiger Leaps.

In addition to Blaze of Noon, she published the novel Behold the Hour in 1959. That novel was a roman à clef set within the CBC.

Following her retirement from journalism, Beattie returned to St. Catharines, where she conducted writing workshops for the St. Catharines Library. She died on September 17, 2005, at age 83 from surgery complications.
