= 1949 Governor General's Awards =

Canadian literary award

The 1949 Governor General's Awards for Literary Merit were the 14th rendition of the Governor General's Awards, Canada's annual national awards program which then comprised literary awards alone. The awards recognized Canadian writers for new English-language works published in Canada during 1949 and were presented early in 1950. There were no cash prizes.

The Governor General's Award for juvenile literature was introduced, and would be conferred annually through the 1958 cycle, after which there were several changes for the 1959 Governor General's Awards under the new administrator Canada Council. As every year from 1949 to 1958, there were two awards for non-fiction, and five awards in four categories that recognized English-language works only.

== Winners ==
- Fiction: Philip Child, Mr. Ames Against Time
- Poetry or drama: James Reaney, The Red Heart
- Non-fiction: Hugh MacLennan, Cross-country
- Non-fiction: R. MacGregor Dawson, Democratic Government in Canada
- Juvenile: Richard S. Lambert, Franklin of the Arctic: a life of adventure
