= Arthur G. Storey =

Canadian writer (1915–2005)

Arthur G. Storey (November 24, 1915 – April 26, 2005) was a Canadian writer. He is most noted for his novel Prairie Harvest, which won the Ryerson Fiction Award in 1959.

Born in Haultain, Saskatchewan in 1915, at the time of his award win Storey was a professor in the faculty of education at the University of Alberta. Prairie Harvest was reissued in 2002 alongside two previously unpublished sequel novels, The Years Between and Proving Ground.
