= Edward McCourt =

Canadian writer (1907–1972)

- Born: Edward Alexander McCourt; October 10, 1907; Mullingar, Ireland
- Died: January 6, 1972 (aged 64); Saskatoon, Canada
- Occupations: novelist, short story writer
- Writing career
- Period: 1940s-1970s

Edward Alexander McCourt (October 10, 1907 – January 6, 1972) was a Canadian writer.

Born in Mullingar, Ireland, McCourt's family emigrated to Kitscoty, Alberta when he was two years old. He was educated at the University of Alberta, becoming a Rhodes Scholar at Merton College, Oxford, and earned an MA from Oxford University. Returning to Canada, he worked at Upper Canada College, Queen's University and the University of New Brunswick before joining the faculty of the University of Saskatchewan in 1944.

McCourt published five novels—Music at the Close (1947), Home Is the Stranger (1950), The Wooden Sword (1956), Walk Through the Valley (1958) and Fasting Friar (1963). His non-fiction titles included The Canadian West in Fiction (1949), a critical analysis of regional literature from the Canadian Prairies, Revolt in the West (1958), about the North-West Rebellion, and Remembering Butler (1967), a biography of Sir William Butler, as well as works of travel writing.

Music at the Close won the Ryerson Fiction Award in 1947, and was republished by the New Canadian Library in 1972.

McCourt died on January 6, 1972.
