= Hugh Walpole =

English writer (1894–1941)

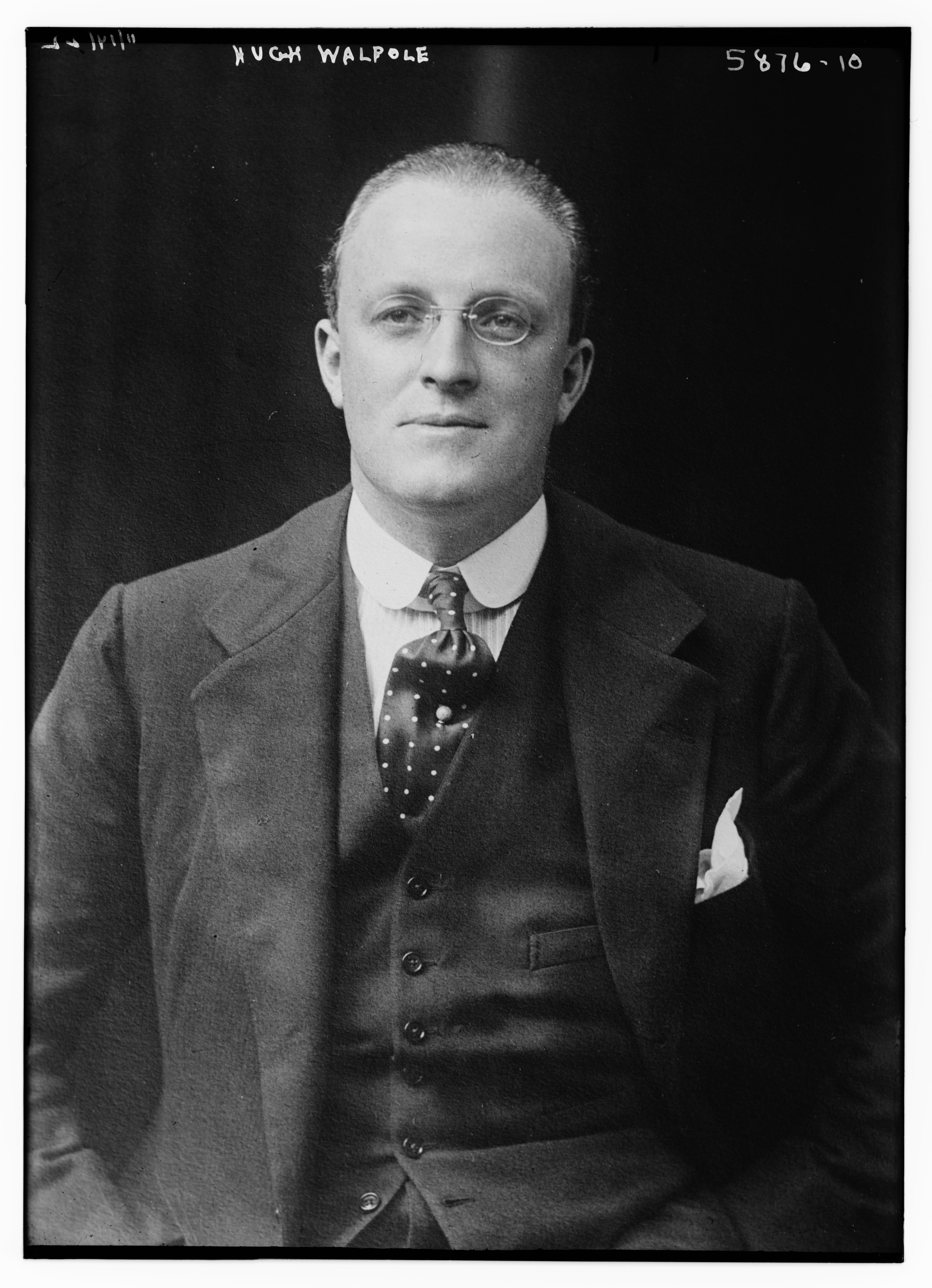
Walpole c. 1920–1925

Sir Hugh Seymour Walpole, CBE (13 March 1884 – 1 June 1941) was an English novelist. He was the son of an Anglican clergyman, intended for a career in the church but drawn instead to writing. Among those who encouraged him were the authors Henry James and Arnold Bennett. His skill at scene-setting and vivid plots, as well as his high profile as a lecturer, brought him a large readership in the United Kingdom and North America. He was a best-selling author in the 1920s and 1930s but has been largely neglected since his death.

After his debut novel, The Wooden Horse, was published in 1909, Walpole wrote prolifically, producing at least one book every year. He was a spontaneous story-teller, writing quickly to get all his ideas on paper, seldom revising. His first novel to achieve major success was his third, Mr Perrin and Mr Traill, a tragicomic story of a fatal clash between two schoolmasters. During the First World War he served in the Red Cross on the Russian-Austrian front, and worked in British propaganda in Petrograd and London. In the 1920s and 1930s Walpole was much in demand not only as a novelist but also as a lecturer on literature, making four exceptionally well-paid tours of North America.

As a gay man at a time when sex between men was illegal in Britain, Walpole conducted a succession of intense but discreet relationships with other men, and was for much of his life in search of what he saw as "the perfect friend". He eventually found one, a married policeman, with whom he settled in the English Lake District. Having as a young man eagerly sought the support of established authors, he was in his later years a generous sponsor of many younger writers. He was a patron of the visual arts and bequeathed a substantial legacy of paintings to the Tate Gallery and other British institutions.

Walpole's output was large and varied. Between 1909 and 1941 he wrote thirty-six novels, five volumes of short stories, two original plays and three volumes of memoirs. His range included disturbing studies of the macabre, children's stories and historical fiction, most notably his Herries Chronicle series, set in the Lake District. He worked in Hollywood writing scenarios for two Metro-Goldwyn-Mayer films in the 1930s, and had a cameo in the 1935 film adaptation of David Copperfield.

== Biography ==
=== Early years ===
Walpole was born in Auckland, New Zealand, the eldest of three children of the Rev Somerset Walpole and his wife, Mildred Helen (née Barham). Somerset had been an assistant to the Bishop of Truro, Edward White Benson, from 1877 until 1882, when he was offered the incumbency of St Mary's Cathedral, Auckland; on Benson's advice he accepted.

Somerset Walpole, the author's father

Mildred Walpole found it hard to settle in New Zealand, and something of her restlessness and insecurity affected the character of her eldest child. In 1889, two years after the birth of the couple's daughter, Dorothea ("Dorothy"), Somerset Walpole accepted a prominent and well-paid academic post at the General Theological Seminary, New York. Robert ("Robin"), the third of the couple's children, was born in New York in 1892. Hugh and Dorothy were taught by a governess until the middle of 1893, when the parents decided that he needed an English education.

Walpole was sent to England, where according to his biographer Rupert Hart-Davis the next ten years were the unhappiest time of Walpole's life. He first attended a preparatory school in Truro. Though he missed his family and felt lonely he was reasonably happy, but he moved to Sir William Borlase's Grammar School in Marlow in 1895, where he was bullied, frightened and miserable. He later said, "The food was inadequate, the morality was 'twisted', and Terror – sheer, stark unblinking Terror – stared down every one of its passages ... The excessive desire to be loved that has always played so enormous a part in my life was bred largely, I think, from the neglect I suffered there".

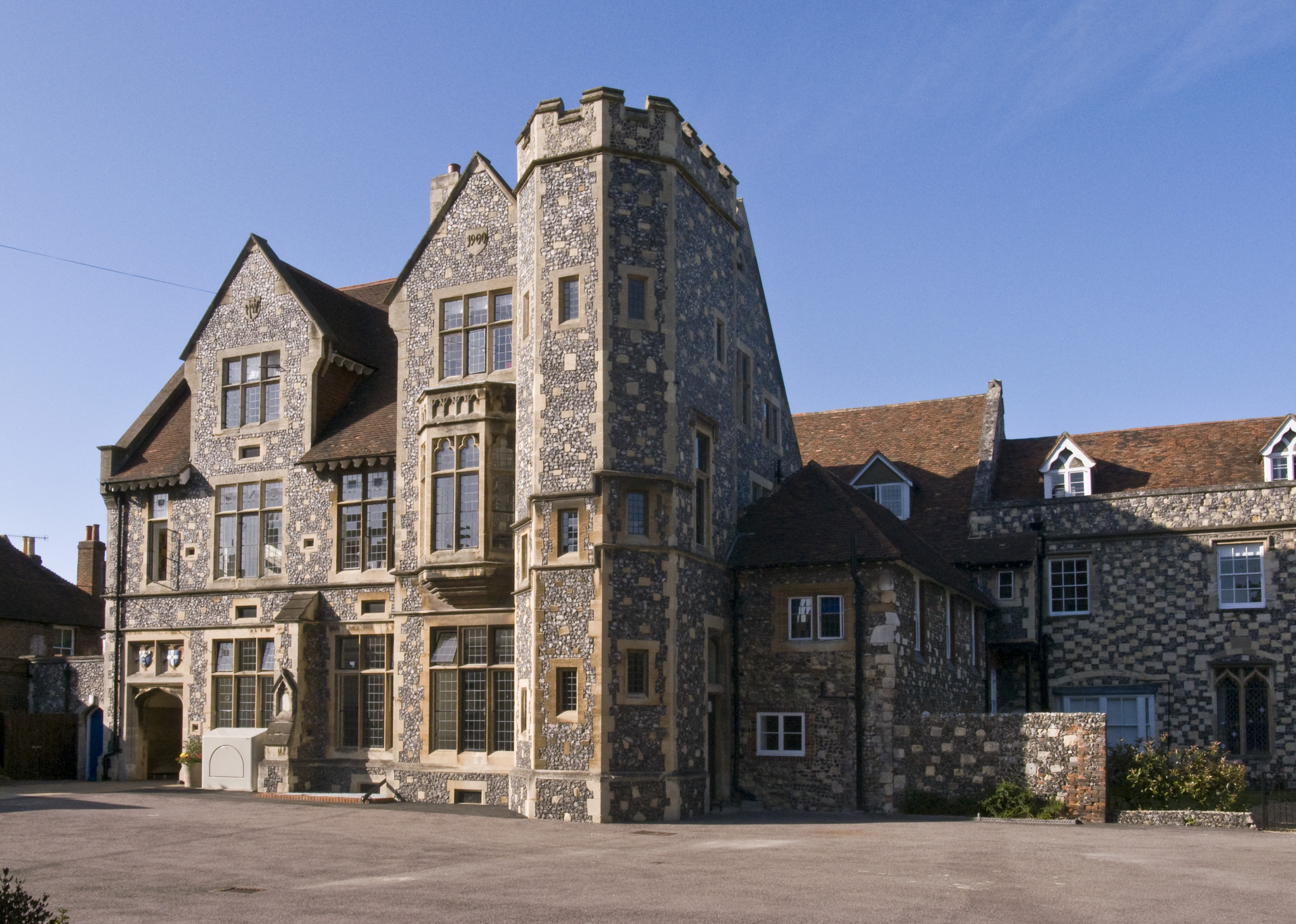
The King's School, Canterbury

In 1896 Somerset Walpole discovered his son's horror of the Marlow school and he moved him to the King's School, Canterbury. For two years he was a fairly content, though undistinguished, pupil there. In 1897 Walpole senior was appointed principal of Bede College, Durham, and Hugh was moved again, to be a day boy for four years at Durham School. He found that day boys were looked down on by boarders, and that Bede College was the subject of snobbery within the university. His sense of isolation increased. He continually took refuge in the local library, where he read all the novels of Jane Austen, Henry Fielding, Walter Scott and Charles Dickens, and many of the works of Anthony Trollope, Wilkie Collins and Henry Kingsley. Walpole wrote in 1924:

I grew up ... discontented, ugly, abnormally sensitive, and excessively conceited. No one liked me – not masters, boys, friends of the family, nor relations who came to stay; and I do not in the least wonder at it. I was untidy, uncleanly, excessively gauche. I believed that I was profoundly misunderstood, that people took my pale and pimpled countenance for the mirror of my soul, that I had marvellous things of interest in me that would one day be discovered.

Though Walpole was no admirer of the schools he had attended there, the cathedral cities of Truro, Canterbury and Durham made a strong impression on him. He drew on aspects of them for his fictional cathedral city of Polchester in Glebeshire, the setting of many of his later books. Walpole's memories of his time at the King's School, Canterbury grew mellower over the years; it was the only school he mentioned in his Who's Who entry.

=== Cambridge, Liverpool and teaching ===
A. C. Benson, an early mentor.

From 1903 to 1906 Walpole studied history at Emmanuel College, Cambridge. While there he had his first work published, (Note: This discounts his earlier writings in a family magazine he edited between 1898 and 1903, called The Social Weekly. Steele comments, "This periodical, complemented by several historical novels Walpole also wrote during this time, constitutes a solid body of juvenilia.") the critical essay "Two Meredithian Heroes", which was printed in the college magazine in autumn 1905. As an undergraduate he met and fell under the spell of A. C. Benson, formerly a greatly loved master at Eton, and by this time a don at Magdalene College. Walpole's religious beliefs, hitherto an unquestioned part of his life, were fading, and Benson helped him through that personal crisis. Walpole was also attempting to cope with his homosexual feelings, which for a while focused on Benson, who recorded in his diary in 1906 an unexpected outburst by his young admirer: "[H]e broke out rather eagerly into protestations – He cared for me more than anyone in the world. I could not believe it ... It is extraordinarily touching. ... It is quite right that he should believe all this passionately; it is quite right that I should know that it will not last ... I tried to say this as tenderly as I could ..."

Benson gently declined Walpole's advances. They remained friends, but Walpole, rebuffed in his "excessive desire to be loved", turned the full force of his enthusiasms elsewhere, and the relationship with Benson became less important to him. Less than two years later Benson's diary entry on Walpole's subsequent social career reveals his thoughts on his protégé's progress:

He seems to have conquered Gosse completely. He spends his Sundays in long walks with H. G. Wells. He dines every week with Max Beerbohm and R Ross ... and this has befallen a not very clever young man of 23. Am I a little jealous? – no, I don't think so. But I am a little bewildered ... I do not see any sign of intellectual power or perception or grasp or subtlety in his work or himself. ... I should call him curiously unperceptive. He does not, for instance, see what may vex or hurt or annoy people. I think he is rather tactless – though he is himself very sensitive. The strong points about him are his curiosity, his vitality, his eagerness, and the emotional fervour of his affections. But he seems to me in no way likely to be great as an artist.

With Benson's help, Walpole had come to terms with the loss of his faith. Somerset Walpole, himself the son of an Anglican priest, hoped that his eldest son would follow him into the ministry. Walpole was too concerned for his father's feelings to tell him he was no longer a believer, and on graduation from Cambridge in 1906 he took a post as a lay missioner at the Mersey Mission to Seamen in Liverpool. He described that as one of the "greatest failures of my life ... The Mission to Seamen was, and is, a splendid institution ... but it needs men of a certain type to carry it through and I was not of that type." The head of the mission reprimanded him for lack of commitment to his work, and Walpole resigned after six months.

Literary forebears: Horace Walpole and Richard Barham.

From April to July 1907 Walpole was in Germany, tutoring the children of the popular author Elizabeth von Arnim. (Note: The Arnims lived at Nassenheide, a village then in the east of Germany, now, known as Rzędziny, in Poland.) In 1908 he taught French at Epsom College. His brief experience of teaching is reflected in his third novel, Mr Perrin and Mr Traill. As well as the clerical forebears, Walpole had notable authors in his family tree: on his father's side, the novelist and letter writer Horace Walpole, and on his mother's Richard Barham, author of The Ingoldsby Legends. It was as an author that Walpole felt impelled to make his career. He moved to London and found work as a book reviewer for The Standard, writing fiction in his spare time. He had by this time recognised unreservedly that he was homosexual. His encounters were necessarily discreet, as such activities were illegal in Britain, and remained so throughout his lifetime. (Note: The principal law against homosexual acts was the Criminal Law Amendment Act 1885, in which Section 11 made any kind of sexual activity between men illegal for the first time. It was not repealed until the passage of the Sexual Offences Act 1967.) He was constantly searching for "the perfect friend"; an early candidate was the stage designer Percy Anderson, to whom he was intimately attached for some time from 1910 onwards. (Note: Not all those who Walpole hoped might be "the perfect friend" were gay. On at least two occasions later in his life he developed strong attachments to married men who, though evidently not sharing Walpole's sexual orientation, were happy to enjoy his friendship.)

=== Early literary career ===
A. C. Benson was a friend of Henry James, to whom Walpole wrote a fan letter late in 1908, with Benson's encouragement. A correspondence ensued and in February 1909 James invited Walpole to lunch at the Reform Club in London. They developed a close friendship, described by James's biographer Leon Edel as resembling a father and son relationship in some, but not all, respects. James was greatly taken with the young Walpole, though clear-eyed about the deficiencies in the artistry and craftsmanship of his protégé's early efforts. According to Somerset Maugham, Walpole made a sexual proposition to James, who was too inhibited to respond. Nevertheless, in their correspondence the older man's devotion was couched in extravagant terms.

Henry James and Arnold Bennett, who encouraged the young Walpole

Walpole published his first novel, The Wooden Horse, in 1909. It told of a staid and snobbish English family shaken up by the return of one of its members from a less hidebound life in New Zealand. The book received good reviews but barely repaid the cost of having it typed. His first commercial success was Mr Perrin and Mr Traill, published in 1911. (Note: After his first two books, Walpole switched publishers from Smith, Elder to Mills and Boon for Mr Perrin and Mr Traill, and had a sequence of short contracts with Newnes, Martin Secker, Cassell and Nisbet, before settling on Macmillan as his main UK publisher from 1918.) The novelist and biographer Michael Sadleir writes that though some of the six novels Walpole wrote between 1909 and 1914 are of interest as examples of the author's developing style, it is Mr Perrin and Mr Traill that deserves to be remembered for its own sake. (Note: Of Walpole's other pre-war books, Sadleir observes, "Maradick at Forty (1910), Fortitude (1913), and The Duchess of Wrexe (1914) are of interest as demonstrating what became permanent tendencies in his more mature work. He would over-labour a single character as a somewhat nebulous symbol: he would strive to portray a mortal presentation of evil; he could catch the décors of life with instinctive precision: and, being a genuine lover of books for their own sake and a voracious reader, he never failed to make apt use of recollected reading." The other pre-war novel was The Prelude to Adventure (1912), described by Walpole's biographer Elizabeth Steele as a murder mystery that attracted the interest of the psychologist Carl Jung.) The book, subtitled "a tragi-comedy", is a psychological study of a deadly clash between two schoolmasters, one an ageing failure and the other a young, attractive idealist. In the view of Hart-Davis, Walpole only once recaptured "the fresh, clear cut realism" of this book, and Walpole himself, looking back on his work in the 1930s, felt that of all his books to date, it was the truest. The Observer gave the book a favourable review: "The slow growth of the poison within [Perrin] is traced with wonderful skill and sympathy ... one feels throughout these pages a sense of intolerable tension, of impending disaster"; The Manchester Guardian was less enthusiastic, praising the scene-setting but calling the story "an unconscientious melodrama". The San Francisco Chronicle praised its "technical excellence, imagination and beauty – Walpole at his best." (Note: For the American edition, The Gods and Mr Perrin, Walpole was persuaded to rewrite the ending, replacing the clifftop struggle and the death of Perrin with a more ambiguous ending with both Perrin and Traill still alive.) Arnold Bennett, a well-established novelist seventeen years Walpole's senior, admired the book, and befriended the young author, regularly chiding, encouraging, sometimes mocking him into improving his prose, characters and narratives.

The Guardian reviewer observed that the setting of Mr Perrin and Mr Traill – a second-rate public school – was clearly drawn from life, as indeed it was. The boys of Epsom College were delighted with the thinly disguised version of their school, but the college authorities were not, and Walpole was persona non grata at Epsom for many years. This was of no practical consequence, as he had no intention of returning to the teaching profession, but it was an early illustration of his capacity, noted by Benson, for unthinkingly giving offence, though being hypersensitive to criticism himself.

In early 1914 James wrote an article for The Times Literary Supplement surveying the younger generation of British novelists and comparing them with their eminent elder contemporaries. In the latter category James put Bennett, Joseph Conrad, John Galsworthy, Maurice Hewlett and H G Wells. (Note: The article was revised and reprinted in James's 1914 book Notes on Novelists under the title "The New Novel".) The four new authors on whom he focused were Walpole, Gilbert Cannan, Compton Mackenzie and D H Lawrence. It was a very lengthy article, to the extent that it had to be spread across two issues of the Supplement in March and April 1914. (Note: In 1928 J B Priestley looked back on this article as "a piece of literary criticism so involved, so inscrutable, that some of the writers it dealt with do not know to this day whether he was praising them or blaming them.") James said that agreeing to write it had been "an insensate step", but from Walpole's point of view it was highly satisfactory: one of the greatest living authors had publicly ranked him among the finest young British novelists.

=== First World War ===
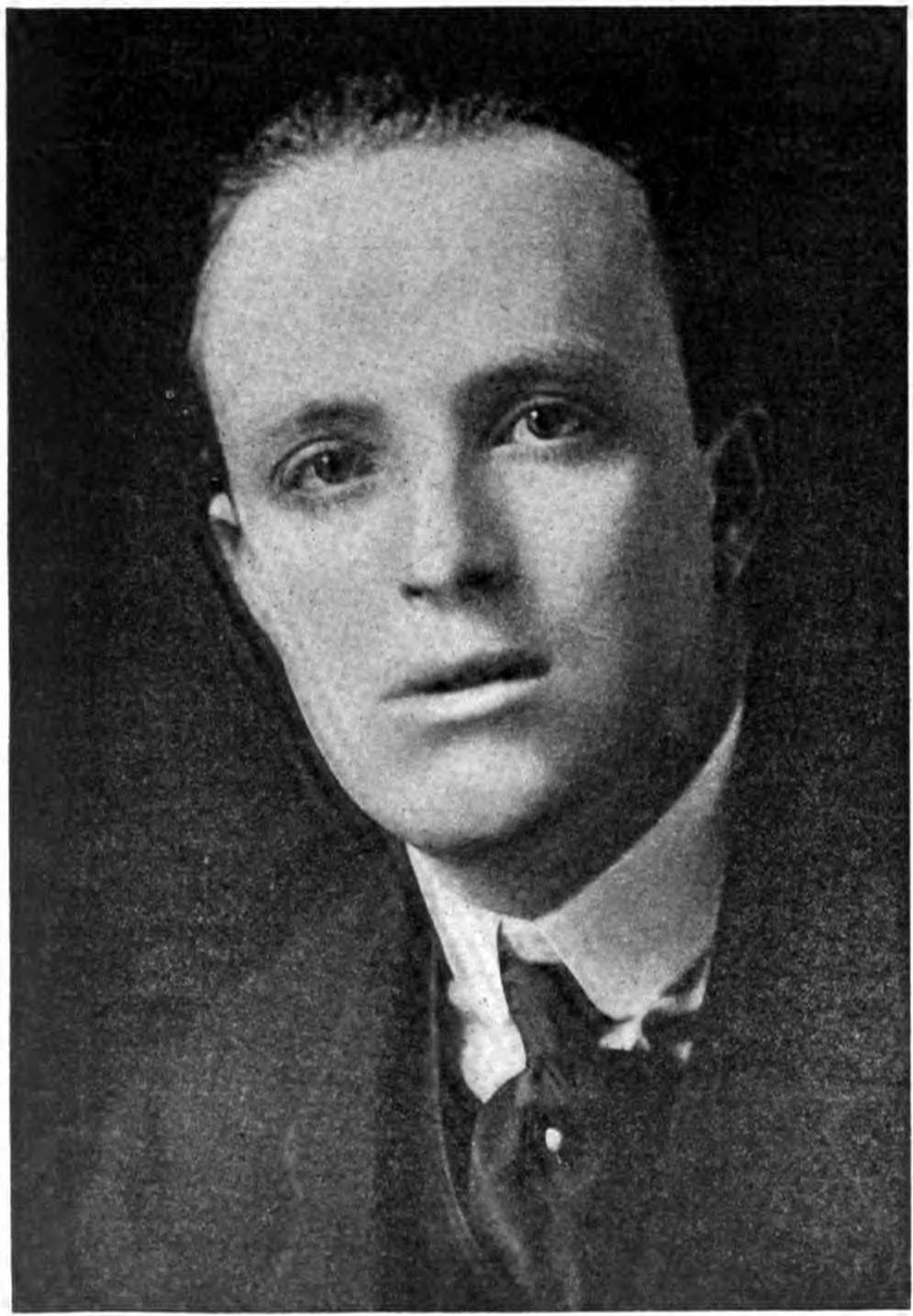
Walpole in 1915

As war approached, Walpole realised that his poor eyesight would disqualify him from serving in the armed forces. (Note: According to Duff Cooper, an old friend of Walpole, Hart-Davis (who was Cooper's nephew) found in Walpole's diaries an admission that he dreaded having to fight, although he knew his short-sightedness precluded it; it was as a non-combatant that he was later decorated for courage in the battlefield.) He volunteered to join the police, but was turned down; he then accepted a journalistic appointment based in Moscow, reporting for The Saturday Review and The Daily Mail. He was allowed to visit the front in Poland, but his dispatches from Moscow (and later from Petrograd, which he preferred) were not enough to stop hostile comments at home that he was not doing his bit for the war effort. Henry James was so incensed at one such remark by a prominent London hostess that he stormed out of her house and wrote to Walpole suggesting that he should return to England. Walpole replied in great excitement that he had just been appointed as a Russian officer, in the Sanitar:

The "Sanitar" is the part of the Red Cross that does the rough work at the front, carrying men out of the trenches, helping at the base hospitals in every sort of way, doing every kind of rough job. They are an absolutely official body and I shall be one of the few (half-dozen) Englishmen in the world wearing Russian uniform.

While in training for the Sanitar, Walpole devoted his leisure hours to gaining a reasonable fluency in the Russian language, and to his first full-length work of non-fiction, a literary biography of Joseph Conrad. In the summer of 1915 he worked on the Austrian-Russian front, assisting at operations in field hospitals and retrieving the dead and wounded from the battlefield. Occasionally he found time to write brief letters home; he told Bennett, "A battle is an amazing mixture of hell and a family picnic – not as frightening as the dentist, but absorbing, sometimes thrilling like football, sometimes dull like church, and sometimes simply physically sickening like bad fish. Burying dead afterwards is worst of all." When disheartened he comforted himself with the thought, "This is not so bad as it was at Marlow".

Konstantin Somov, with whom Walpole lived in Petrograd

During an engagement early in June 1915 Walpole single-handedly rescued a wounded soldier; his Russian comrades refused to help and Walpole carried one end of a stretcher and dragged the man to safety. For this he was awarded the Cross of Saint George; General Lechitsky presented him with the medal in August. After his tour of duty he returned to Petrograd. Among the city's attractions for him was the presence of Konstantin Somov, a painter with whom he had formed an intimate relationship. Throughout his time in Petrograd and Moscow he kept a diary of the books he read and the plays and operas he attended, a habit that continued throughout his life. He met Maxim Gorky, Mikhail Lykiardopoulos, Nikita Baliev and immersed himself in the Moscow art scene which influenced the Symbolism in his work. He remained in Russia until October 1915, when he returned to England. He visited his family, stayed with Percy Anderson in London, telephoned Henry James in Rye, and retreated to a cottage he had bought in Cornwall. In January 1916 he was asked by the Foreign Office to return to Petrograd. Russians were being subjected to highly effective German propaganda. The writer Arthur Ransome, Petrograd correspondent of The Daily News, had successfully lobbied for the establishment of a bureau to counter the German efforts, and the British ambassador, Sir George Buchanan, wanted Walpole to take charge.

Before he left for Petrograd, Walpole's novel The Dark Forest was published. It drew on his experiences in Russia, and was more sombre than much of his earlier fiction. Reviews were highly favourable; The Daily Telegraph commented on "a high level of imaginative vision ... reveals capacity and powers in the author which we had hardly suspected before."

Walpole returned to Petrograd in February 1916. He moved into Somov's flat, and his Anglo-Russian Propaganda Bureau began work. The following month he suffered a personal blow: he recorded in his diary for 13 March 1916, "Thirty two to-day! Should have been a happy day but was completely clouded for me by reading in the papers of Henry James' death. This was a terrible shock to me." (Note: Walpole later wrote of James, "I loved him, was frightened of him, was bored by him, was staggered by his wisdom and stupefied by his intricacies, altogether enslaved by his kindness, generosity, child-like purity of his affections, his unswerving loyalties, his sly and Puck-like sense of humour.") Walpole remained at the bureau for the rest of 1916 and most of 1917, witnessing the February Revolution. He wrote an official report on events for the Foreign Office, and also absorbed ideas for his fiction. In addition to the first of his popular "Jeremy" novels, written in his spare time from the bureau, he began work on the second of his Russian-themed books, The Secret City. Sadleir writes that this novel and The Dark Forest "take a high place among his works, on account of their intuitive understanding of an alien mentality and the vigour of their narrative power." The book won the inaugural James Tait Black Memorial Prize for fiction. (Note: This was in 1919. Walpole's successors in the 1920s included Lawrence (1920), Bennett (1923), E M Forster (1924), Radclyffe Hall (1926), Siegfried Sassoon (1928) and J B Priestley (1929).)

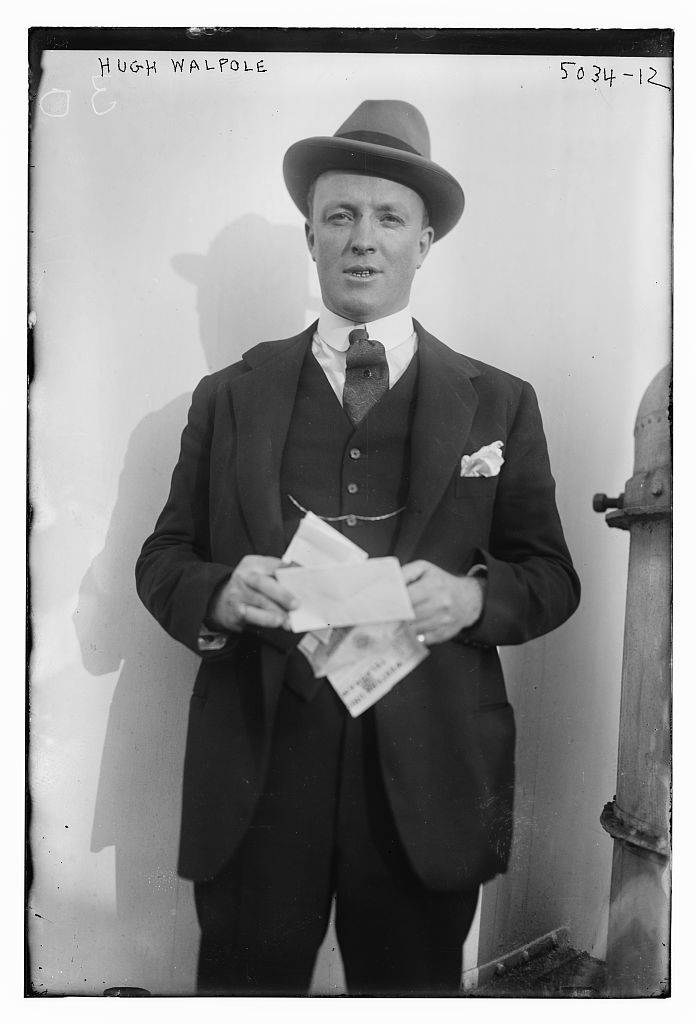
Walpole circa 1915

By late 1917 it was clear to Walpole and to the British authorities that there was little advantage in keeping him in Russia. On 7 November he left, missing the Bolshevik Revolution, which began on that day. He was appointed to a post at the Foreign Office in its Department of Information, headed by John Buchan. (Note: The department had been set up at the outbreak of war to further British propaganda, and used the services of many British authors including Bennett, Wells, William Archer, Anthony Hope, Gilbert Murray, John Masefield and Ian Hay.) Soon after returning he volunteered for the British Army, but, as expected, failed the necessary medical examination because of his poor sight. He continued to work in British propaganda when the department was reconstituted under Lord Beaverbrook in April 1918, and remained there for the rest of the war and beyond, resigning in February 1919. Little is known about what he wrote for the department, as most of its records were destroyed after the war, but he noted in his diary that he had written the department's official report to the War Cabinet: "a beastly job – the worst I've ever attempted". For his wartime work he was awarded the CBE in 1918.

=== Post-war and 1920s ===
Walpole remained prolific in the post-war years, and began a parallel and highly remunerative career as a lecturer in literature. At the instigation of his American publisher, George Doran, he made his first lecture tour of the US in 1919, receiving an enthusiastic welcome wherever he went. What Sadleir describes as Walpole's "genial and attractive appearance, his complete lack of aloofness, his exciting fluency as a speaker [and] his obvious and genuine liking for his hosts" combined to win him a large American following. The success of his talks led to increases in his lecturing fees, greatly enhanced sales of his books, and large sums from American publishers anxious to print his latest fiction. He was a prodigiously quick writer who seldom revised, but pressed on, keen to get his ideas down on paper. His main British publishers, Macmillan, found it expedient to appoint a senior member of staff to edit his manuscripts, correcting spelling, punctuation, inconsistencies and errors of historical fact. His fluency enabled him to fulfil between tours a contract from The Pictorial Review for ten short stories at the remarkable sum of $1,350 apiece.

One of Walpole's major novels of the early post-war period was The Cathedral, which unlike much of his fiction was not dashed off but worked on across four years, beginning in 1918. The story of an arrogant 19th-century archdeacon in conflict with other clergy and laity was certain to bring comparisons with Trollope's Barchester Towers (The Manchester Guardian's review was headed "Polchester Towers"), but unlike the earlier work, The Cathedral is wholly uncomic. The hubristic Archdeacon Brandon is driven to domestic despair, professional defeat and sudden death. The reviewer Ivor Brown commented that Walpole had earlier charmed many with his cheerful tales of Mayfair, but that in this novel he showed a greater side to his art: "This is a book with little happiness about it, but its stark strength is undeniable. The Cathedral is realism, profound in its philosophy and delicate in its thread." The Illustrated London News said, "No former novelist has seized quite so powerfully upon the cathedral fabric and made it a living character in the drama, an obsessing individuality at once benign and forbidding. ...The Cathedral is a great book."

Walpole was a keen music lover and when in 1920 he heard a new tenor at the Proms he was much impressed and sought him out. Lauritz Melchior became one of the most important friendships of his life, and Walpole did much to foster the singer's budding career. Richard Wagner's son Siegfried engaged Melchior for the Bayreuth Festival in 1924 and succeeding years. Walpole attended, and met Adolf Hitler, then recently released from prison after an attempted putsch. Hitler was a protégé of Siegfried's wife Winifred, and was known in Bayreuth as "one of Winnie's lame ducks." Walpole later admitted that he had both despised and liked him – "both emotions that time has proved I was wrong to indulge". This and future visits to Bayreuth were complicated by the fact that Winifred Wagner fell in love with Walpole, and attached herself so firmly to him that rumours began to spread.

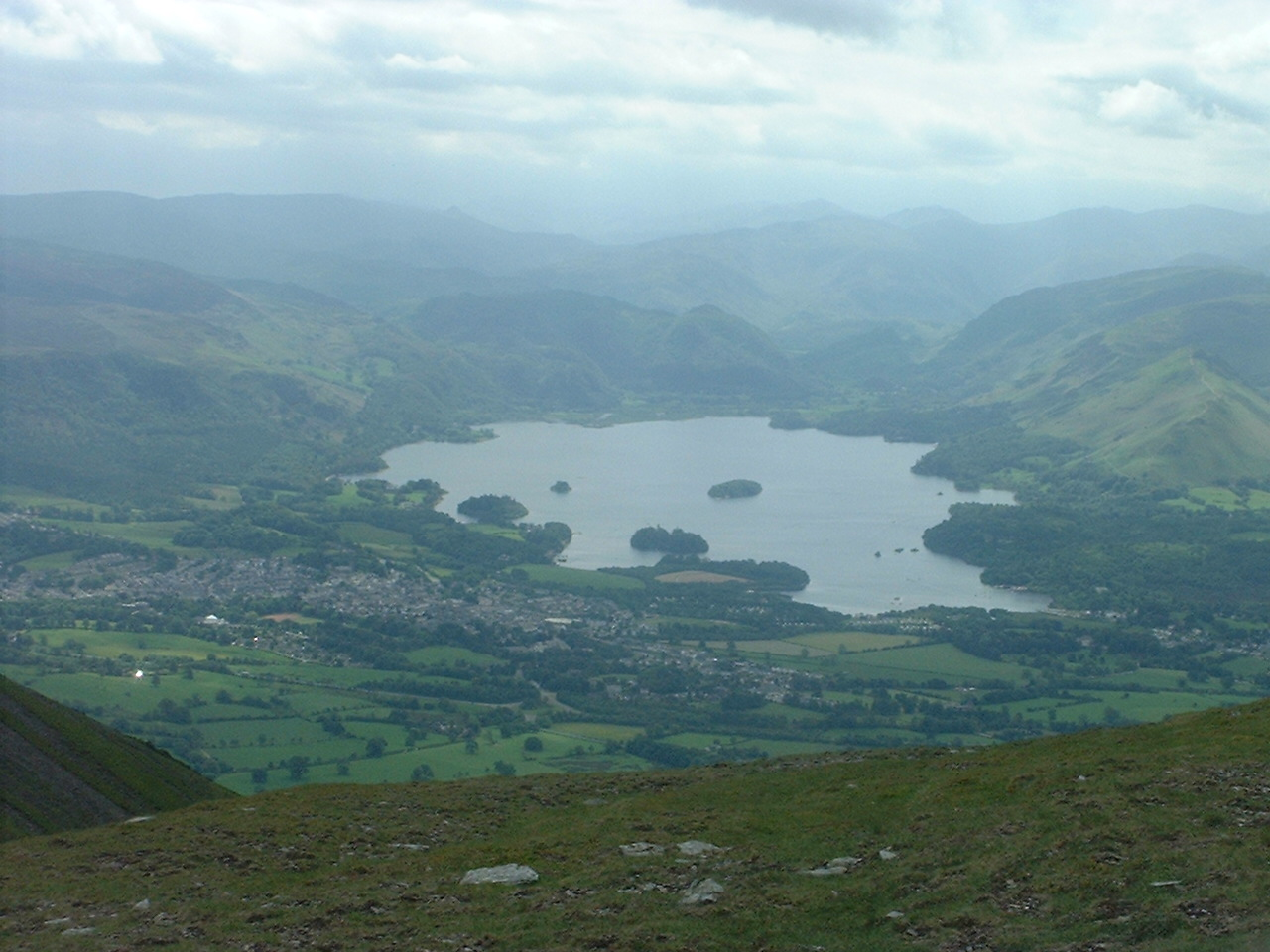
Derwentwater, looking towards Brackenburn. The Lake District inspired many of Walpole's novels.

In 1924 Walpole moved into a house near Keswick in the Lake District. His large income enabled him to maintain his London flat in Piccadilly, but Brackenburn, on the slopes of Catbells overlooking Derwentwater, was his main home for the rest of his life. He was quickly made welcome by local residents, and the scenery and atmosphere of the Lake District often found their way into his fiction. (Note: Walpole wrote in 1939, "That I love Cumberland with all my heart and soul is another reason for my pleasure in writing these Herries books. That I wasn't born a Cumbrian isn't my fault: that Cumbrians, in spite of my 'foreignness', have been so kind to me, is my good fortune.") The critic James Agate commented that one might think from some of Walpole's stories that their author had created the English Lakes, but that he was probably only consulted about them. At the end of 1924 Walpole met Harold Cheevers, who soon became his friend and companion and remained so for the rest of Walpole's life. In Hart-Davis's words, he came nearer than any other human being to Walpole's long-sought conception of a perfect friend. Cheevers, a policeman, with a wife and two children, left the police force and entered Walpole's service as his chauffeur. Walpole trusted him completely, and gave him extensive control over his affairs. Whether Walpole was at Brackenburn or Piccadilly, Cheevers was almost always with him, and often accompanied him on overseas trips. Walpole provided a house in Hampstead for Cheevers and his family.

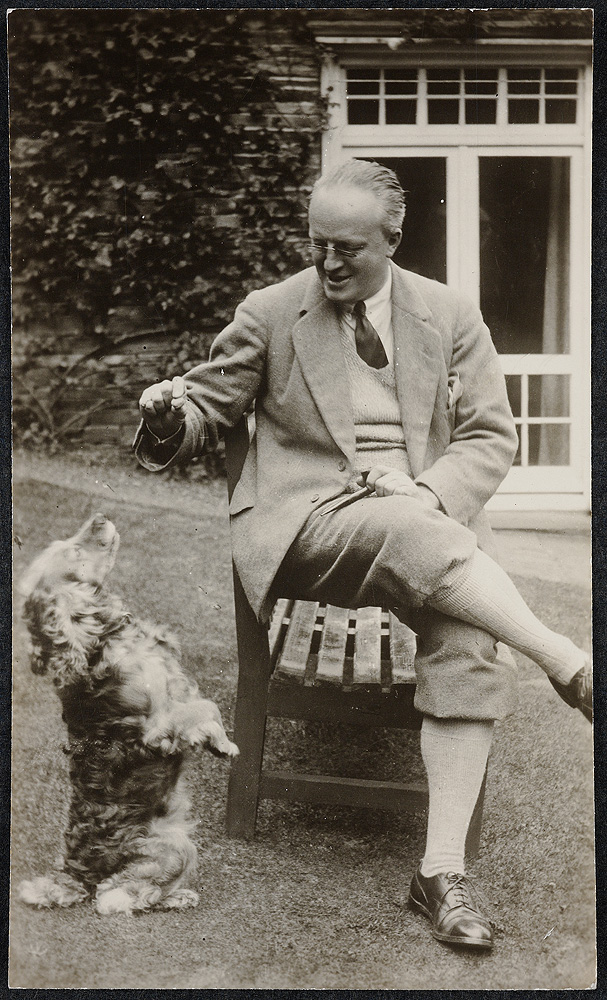
Walpole at Brackenburn, 1929

During the mid-twenties Walpole produced two of his best-known novels in the macabre vein that he drew on from time to time, exploring the fascination of fear and cruelty. The Old Ladies (1924) is a study of a timid elderly spinster exploited and eventually frightened to death by a predatory widow. Portrait of a Man with Red Hair (1925) depicts the malign influence of a manipulative, insane father on his family and others. Walpole described it to his fellow author Frank Swinnerton as "a simple shocker which it has amused me like anything to write, and won't bore you to read." In contrast he continued a series of stories for children, begun in 1919 with Jeremy, taking the young hero's story forward with Jeremy and Hamlet (the latter being the boy's dog) in 1923, and Jeremy at Crale in 1927. Sadleir, writing in the 1950s, suggests that "the most real Walpole of all – because the most unselfconscious, kindly, and understanding friend – is the Walpole of the Jeremy trilogy." Of his other novels of the 1920s Wintersmoon (1928), his first attempt at a full-length love story, portrays a clash between traditionalism and modernism: his own sympathies, though not spelled out, were clearly with the traditionalists. In 1929, Walpole, along with J. B. Priestley, joined the panel of a new organisation, the Book Society. The Book Society was one of the first British "Book sales clubs"; it was modelled on the American "Book of the Month" club. Walpole was in charge of selecting titles for sale to the Book Society's members.

=== 1930–1941 ===
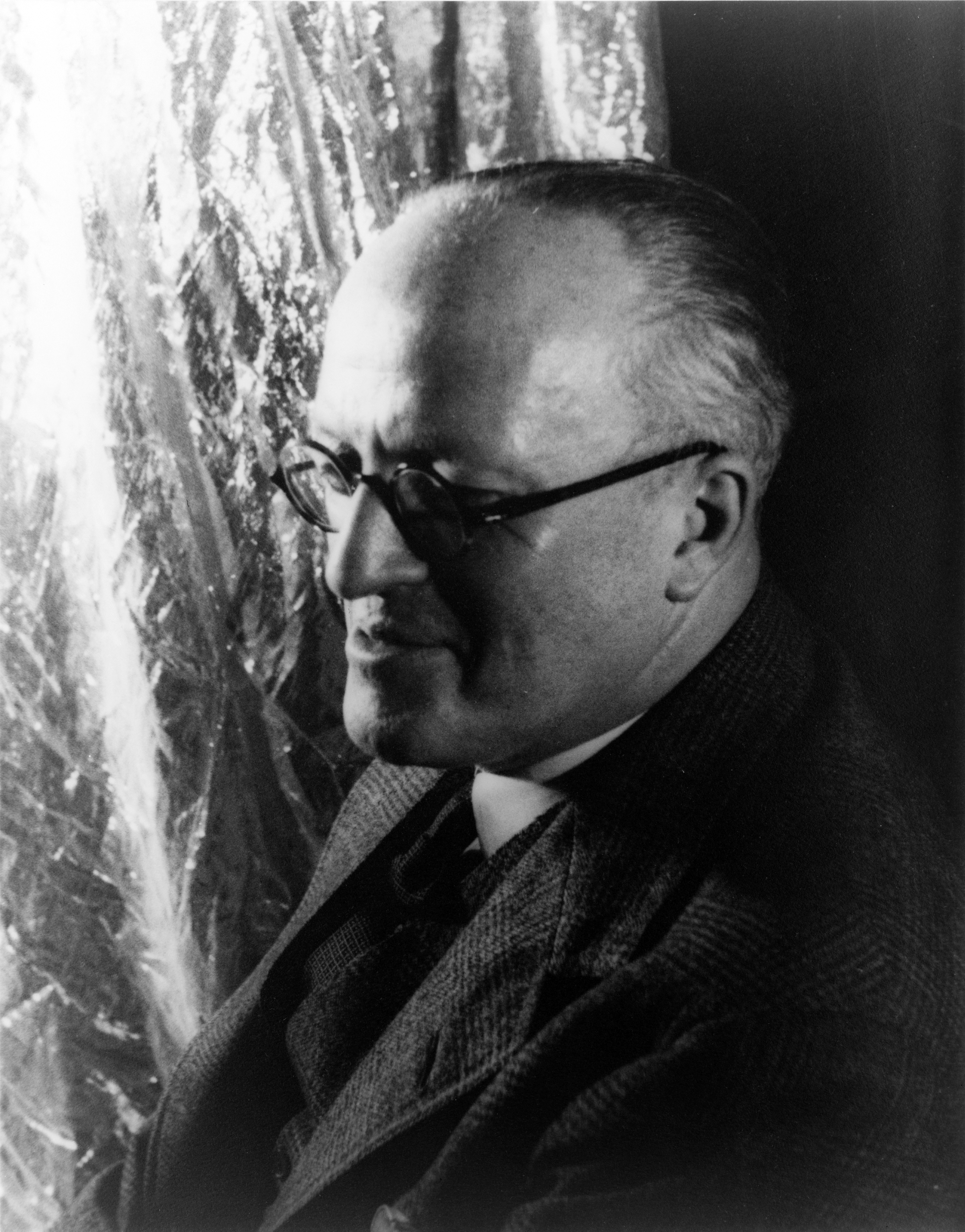
Walpole, photographed by Carl Van Vechten, 1934

By the 1930s, though his public success remained considerable, many literary critics saw Walpole as outdated. His reputation in literary circles took a blow from a malicious caricature in Somerset Maugham's 1930 novel Cakes and Ale: the character Alroy Kear, a superficial novelist of more pushy ambition than literary talent, was widely taken to be based on Walpole. (Note: Maugham assured Walpole that he was not the model for Alroy Kear, who, Maugham averred, was chiefly based on himself. After Walpole's death Maugham admitted that this was a lie. Maugham's biographer Selina Hastings quotes a contemporary's view that Kear was Maugham's revenge on Walpole for "a stolen boyfriend, an unrequited love and an old canker of jealousy".) In the same year Walpole wrote possibly his best-known work, Rogue Herries, a historical novel set in the Lake District. It was well-received: The Daily Mail considered it "not only a profound study of human character, but a subtle and intimate biography of a place." He followed it with three sequels; all four novels were published in a single volume as The Herries Chronicle.

In 1934 Walpole accepted an invitation from Metro-Goldwyn-Mayer studios to go to Hollywood to write the scenario for a film adaptation of David Copperfield. He enjoyed many aspects of life in Hollywood, but as one who rarely revised any of his own work he found it tedious to produce sixth and seventh drafts at the behest of the studio. He enjoyed his brief change of role from writer to bit-part player: in the film he played the Vicar of Blunderstone delivering a boring sermon that sends David to sleep. Agate was doubtful of the wisdom of this: "Does not Hugh see that to bring a well-known character from real life into an imaginary sequence of events is to destroy the reality of that imaginary sequence?" Nevertheless, Walpole's performance was a success. He improvised the sermon; the producer, David O Selznick, mischievously called for retake after retake to try to make him dry up, but Walpole fluently delivered a different extempore address each time.

The critical and commercial success of the film of David Copperfield led to an invitation to return to Hollywood in 1936. When he got there he found that the studio executives had no idea which films they wanted him to work on, and he had eight weeks of highly paid leisure, during which he wrote a short story and worked on a novel. He was eventually asked to write the scenario for Little Lord Fauntleroy, which he enjoyed doing. He spent most of his fees on paintings, forgetting to keep enough money to pay US tax on his earnings. He replenished his American funds with a lecture tour – his last – in late 1936. (Note: The British Film Institute lists three film versions of Walpole's own works made in the 1930s and 40s: Kind Lady (1935, partly based on "The Silver Mask", a 1933 short story), Vanessa: Her Love Story (1935) and Mr Perrin and Mr Traill (1948).)

In 1937 Walpole was offered a knighthood. He accepted, though confiding to his diary that he could not think of a good novelist since Walter Scott who had done so. "Kipling, Hardy, Galsworthy all refused. But I'm not of their class, and range with Doyle, Anthony Hope and such. ... Besides I shall like being a knight."

Walpole's taste for adventure did not diminish in his last years. In 1939 he was commissioned to report for William Randolph Hearst's newspapers on the funeral in Rome of Pope Pius XI, the conclave to elect his successor, and the subsequent coronation. A fellow correspondent was Tom Driberg, whose memoirs tell of a lunch à deux at which Walpole arrived flushed with excitement from a sexual encounter that morning with an attendant at Borghese Palace. In the weeks between the funeral and Pope Pius XII's election Walpole, with his customary fluency, wrote much of his book Roman Fountain, a mixture of fact and fiction about the city. This was his last overseas visit.

After the outbreak of the Second World War Walpole remained in England, dividing his time between London and Keswick, and continuing to write with his usual rapidity. He completed a fifth novel in the Herries series and began work on a sixth. (Note: These were The Bright Pavilions (1941) and Katherine Christian (unfinished, published 1943).) His health was undermined by diabetes. He overexerted himself at the opening of Keswick's fund-raising "War Weapons Week" in May 1941, making a speech after taking part in a lengthy march, and died of a heart attack at Brackenburn, aged 57. He is buried in St John's churchyard in Keswick.

=== Legacy ===
Walpole was a keen and discerning collector of art. Sir Kenneth Clark called him "one of the three or four real patrons of art in this country, and of that small body he was perhaps the most generous and the most discriminating." He left fourteen works to the Tate Gallery and Fitzwilliam Museum, including paintings by Paul Cézanne, Édouard Manet, Augustus John, James Tissot and Pierre-Auguste Renoir.

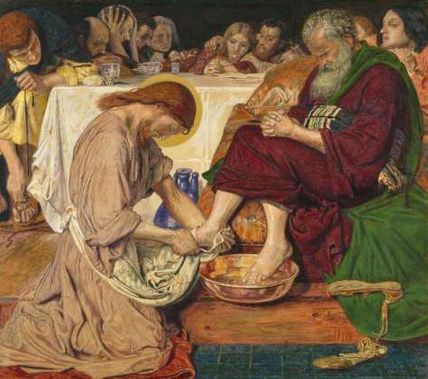
Part of Walpole's bequests to the nation: Ford Madox Brown's Jesus washing Peter's feet

Other artists represented in Walpole's collection were Jacob Epstein, Pablo Picasso, Paul Gauguin, Walter Sickert and Maurice Utrillo. After his death the finest works in his collection, other than those bequeathed, were exhibited in London during April and May 1945; the exhibition also included works by John Constable, J. M. W. Turner and Auguste Rodin.

Sadleir notes how Walpole's considerable income enabled him to indulge not only his love of art and of old books and manuscripts, but also philanthropy, particularly towards younger writers. Although Walpole enjoyed the limelight, he was secretive about his many acts of generosity to younger writers, with both encouragement and financial help. After his death some idea of the scale of his generosity was discovered. Osbert Sitwell commented, "I don't think there was any younger writer of any worth who has not at one time or another received kindness of an active kind, and at a crucial moment, from Hugh". Hart-Davis lists thirty-eight authors from whom letters of gratitude were found among Walpole's correspondence; (Note: Among the writers listed by Hart-Davis are H E Bates, John Betjeman, Cecil Day-Lewis, T S Eliot, Graham Greene, Christopher Isherwood and Dylan Thomas.) Sadleir writes of Walpole's "generous kindness to literary aspirants and to writers fallen on evil days ... by immediate financial assistance, by prefaces freely supplied or by collaboration volunteered, by introductions and recommendations to likely publishers, Walpole relieved the distresses of authorship to a degree which will never be fully known." Agate, though himself the recipient of Walpole's generosity on occasion, thought it sometimes went too far: "Mr Walpole's large-heartedness gets him into all kinds of trouble. He is an inveterate patter. He pats on the back young men whom sterner critics would knock down, because even in fantastic incompetence he perceives the good intention. No art or artist is safe from Mr Walpole's benevolence".

In his adopted home of Keswick a section of the town museum was dedicated to Walpole's memory in 1949, with manuscripts, correspondence, paintings and sculpture from Brackenburn, donated by his sister and brother.

The Hugh Walpole Society was founded in 2020 to promote the appreciation and study of Walpole's life and works. As well as publishing a journal, The Hugh Walpole Review, twice a year, the society also arranges in-person events for members in locations with Walpole associations. It is a member of the Alliance of Literary Societies, the Friends of Keswick Museum and Art Gallery and also of St John's Church, Keswick where he is buried. In 2023 the society published Red Amber and Other Stories, a volume of twelve uncollected short stories.

== Works ==
Walpole's books cover a wide range. His fiction includes short stories, bildungsromane (Mr Perrin and Mr Traill, 1911, and the Jeremy trilogy) that delve into the psychology of boyhood; gothic horror novels (Portrait of a Man with Red Hair, 1925, and The Killer and the Slain, 1942); ghost stories (All Souls' Night, 1933); a period family saga (the Herries chronicle) and even detective fiction (Behind the Screen). He wrote literary biographies (Conrad, 1916; James Branch Cabell, 1920; and Trollope, 1928); plays; and screenplays including David Copperfield, 1935.

=== Influences ===
Trollope, Dostoyevsky, Scott

Walpole's debt to Henry James is discernible in The Duchess of Wrexe (1914) and The Green Mirror (1917), but in the view of J B Priestley the two most potent influences on Walpole were the highly contrasting ones of Trollope and Fyodor Dostoyevsky. Other critics noted the Trollopian influence; in 1923 Arthur St John Adcock commented:

The Trenchards [in The Green Mirror] are a kind of family Trollope might have created had he been living now; The Cathedral is a kind of story he might have told, with its realistic melodrama and its clerical atmosphere, but Walpole tells it with a subtler art in the writing and the construction, with a conciseness and charm of style that are outside the range of the earlier novelist.

Walpole, though he was devoted to the works of Trollope, and published a study of him, thought that there was no real comparison between the two of them: "I am far too twisted and fantastic a novelist ever to succeed in catching Trollope's marvellous normality." Priestley was less impressed by the supposed Trollopian side of Walpole's work, finding some of it formulaic. He was more taken with a darker, Dostoyevskian, side that he found in the writing: "suddenly it will transform the pleasant easy scene he is giving us into transparency behind which are bright stars and red hellfire ... No matter how jolly and zestful he may appear to be, the fact remains that he possesses an unusually sharp sense of evil."

Possibly the most pervasive influence on Walpole was Walter Scott, whose romanticism is reflected in much of the later writer's fiction. Such was Walpole's love of Scott that he liked to think of himself as the latter's reincarnation. He amassed the largest collection in Britain of Scott manuscripts and early editions, and constantly reread the novels. With the Herries stories Walpole restored the popularity of the historical novel, a form for which Scott was famous but which had been out of fashion for decades. The Herries series begins in the 18th century and follows a Lakeland family through the generations up to modern times.

=== Reputation ===
Walpole sought critical as well as financial success, and longed to write works that equalled those of Trollope, Thomas Hardy and Henry James. In his early days, he received frequent and generally approving scrutiny from major literary figures. He was a good friend of Virginia Woolf, and rated her as an influence; she praised his gift for seizing on telling detail: "it is no disparagement to a writer to say that his gift is for the small things rather than for the large ... If you are faithful with the details the large effects will grow inevitably out of those very details". Joseph Conrad said of him, "We see Mr. Walpole grappling with the truth of things spiritual and material with his characteristic earnestness, and we can discern the characteristics of this acute and sympathetic explorer of human nature." In 1928 Priestley observed,

When I first remember seeing Hugh Walpole's name he had no public at all, but the ferocious young reviewers – the "highbrows" as we have since learned to call them – delighted in him. Now he has an enormous public, both in England and America, and the young "highbrows" – who are saddened by the thought of a large public – are not particularly fond of him.

Priestley contended that Walpole had fulfilled his early potential, unlike Compton Mackenzie, Gilbert Cannan and other promising young novelists of his generation. This view was not universal among critics: Walpole sometimes divided opinion. Writing of Walpole's Russian novels, the contemporary critic and novelist Douglas Goldring commented, "Russia has been the grave of many reputations; and our Napoleon of the drawing-room novel has fared no better than other would-be conquerors of that disconcerting land." Goldring's complaint was that Walpole's Russian (and English) characters were clichéd stereotypes. The reviewer in Punch, by contrast, wrote, "I consulted a Russian, who is very much alive, and received the opinion that, if Mr. Walpole has not succeeded in drawing the real average Russian, he has given us a type whose faults and virtues sound the keynote of the situation as it is to-day." The Observer rated The Dark Forest as "one of the finest novels of our generation".

Among Walpole's bequests to the nation

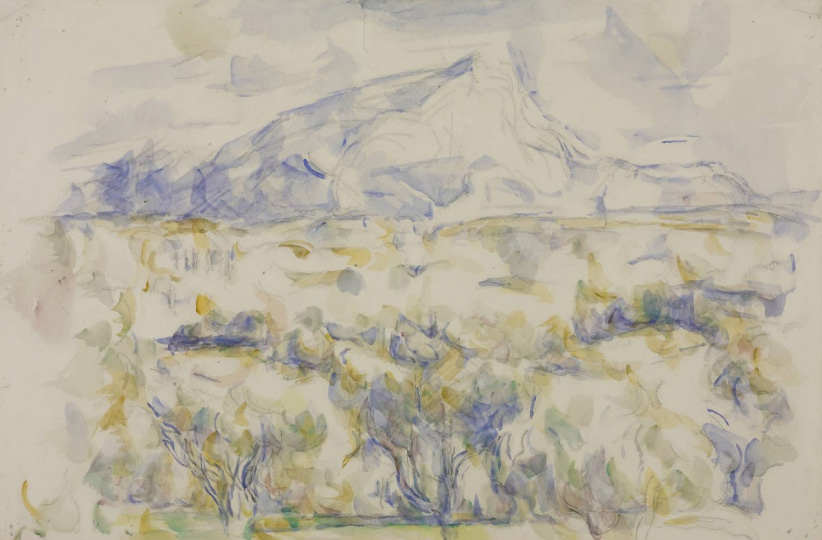
Paul Cézanne: Montagne-Sainte-Victoire

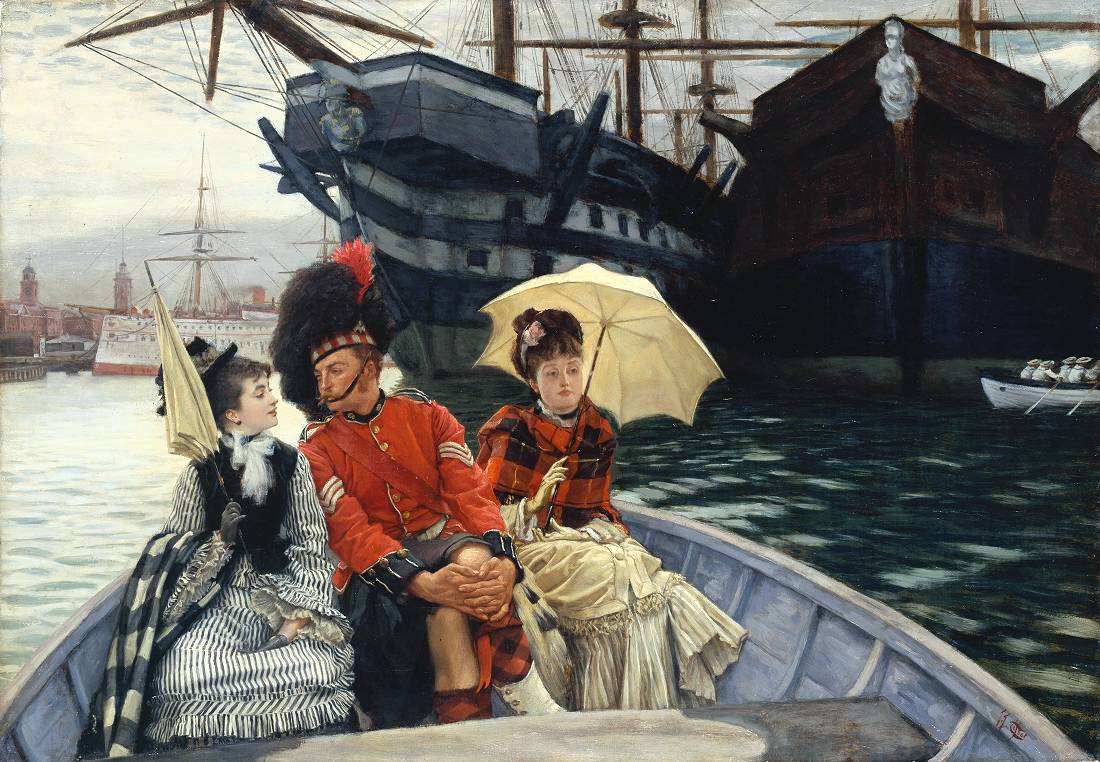
James Tissot: Portsmouth Harbour

In 1924 Ernest Hemingway wrote into a short story a comparison of G. K. Chesterton and Walpole, concluding that the former was the better man, the latter a better writer and both were classics. Walpole could be sensitive about his literary reputation and often took adverse criticism badly. When Hilaire Belloc praised P. G. Wodehouse as the best English writer of their day, Walpole took it amiss, to the amusement of Wodehouse who regarded Belloc's plaudit as "a gag, to get a rise out of serious-minded authors whom he disliked". (Note: Wodehouse wrote to a friend, "I can't remember if I ever told you about meeting Hugh when I was at Oxford getting my D.Litt. I was staying with the Vice-Chancellor at Magdalen and he blew in and spent the day. It was just after Hilaire Belloc had said that I was the best living English writer. It was just a gag, of course, but it worried Hugh terribly. He said to me, 'Did you see what Belloc said about you?' I said I had. 'I wonder why he said that.' 'I wonder,' I said. Long silence. 'I can't imagine why he said that,' said Hugh. I said I couldn't, either. Another long silence. 'It seems such an extraordinary thing to say!' 'Most extraordinary.' Long silence again. 'Ah, well,' said Hugh, having apparently found the solution, 'the old man's getting very old.'") Wodehouse was not a great admirer of Walpole; his own scrupulous craftsmanship, with drafts polished over and over again, was the opposite of Walpole's hastily written and seldom-revised prose. He also viewed Walpole's sensitivity to criticism as absurd. Walpole was not always as oversensitive as Wodehouse supposed. The critic James Agate was a friend despite his regular rude remarks about Walpole's prose, and when Walpole discovered that Agate had written a spoof of the Herries "Lakeland" style, he made him promise to print it in the next published volume of his diaries. (Note: Agate's parody, duly printed at Walpole's insistence, began: "'Twas early morn. The dew was still on the grass, and the grass was still underneath the dew. Presently the sun would get hotter and there would be no more dew. But the grass would remain. When the dew had gone the grass would be dry, and Susan Saddleback would be able to sit down.") In the 1930s the literary critics F. R. Leavis and Q. D. Leavis, who regarded popularity as incompatible with literary value and were hostile to authors writing for a general audience, condemned Walpole's work as providing "jam for the masses" (Note: Other authors condemned by the Leavises included Charles Dickens, Henry James, John Galsworthy, P. G. Wodehouse, J. B. Priestley, Dorothy L. Sayers, Rebecca West, Ernest Hemingway, C. P. Snow and many others. In his 1930 pamphlet, Mass Civilisation and Minority Culture (1930) Leavis described Walpole's work as "uplift" writing, to be regarded as the lowest form of commercial writing.)

During his career contemporaries saw both negative and positive sides to Walpole's outgoing nature and desire to be in the public eye. Wodehouse commented, "I always think Hugh Walpole's reputation was two thirds publicity. He was always endorsing books and speaking at lunches and so on." Maugham called Walpole "...the most prominent member of that body of writers who attempt by seizing every opportunity to keep in the public eye, by getting on familiar terms with the critics so that their books may be favourably reviewed, by currying favour wherever it can serve them, to attain a success which their merit scarcely deserves. They attempt to push and pull to make up for their lack of talent." On the other hand, Walpole stood out as one of the few literary figures willing to go into court and give evidence for the defence at the obscenity trial after the 1928 lesbian novel by Radclyffe Hall, The Well of Loneliness, was published.

By the time of his death The Times's estimation of Walpole was no higher than, "he had a versatile imagination; he could tell a workmanlike story in good workmanlike English; and he was a man of immense industry, conscientious and painstaking". The belittling tone of the obituary brought forth strong rebuttals from T. S. Eliot, Kenneth Clark and Priestley, among others. Within a few years of his death, Walpole was seen as old-fashioned, and his works were largely neglected. In the Oxford Dictionary of National Biography Elizabeth Steele summed up: "His psychology was not deep enough for the polemicist, his diction not free enough for those returning from war, and his zest disastrous to a public wary of personal commitment".

Walpole's works have not been completely neglected in recent years. The Herries stories have seldom been out of print, and in 2014 WorldCat listed a dozen recent reissues of Walpole's works, including The Wooden Horse, The Dark Forest, The Secret City, Jeremy, and The Cathedral. In 2011 the BBC broadcast a reappraisal of Walpole, The Walpole Chronicle, presented by Eric Robson. In 2013 a new stage version of Rogue Herries was presented by the Theatre by the Lake company in Walpole's adopted home of Keswick. The BBC speculated that this could mark a revival in interest in his works.

=== Biographies ===
Two full-length studies of Walpole were published after his death. The first, in 1952, was written by Rupert Hart-Davis, who had known Walpole personally. It was regarded at the time as "among the half dozen best biographies of the century" and has been reissued several times since its first publication. (Note: WorldCat (November 2013) lists reissues in 1962 (Harcourt Brace, New York), 1963 (Rupert Hart-Davis, London) and 1980 (Greenwood Press, Westport, Conn), and a new edition in 1980 (Hamish Hamilton, London), reissued in 1985 (Hamish Hamilton) and 1997 (Phoenix Mill, Stroud, UK).) Writing when homosexual acts between men were still outlawed in England, Hart-Davis avoided direct mention of his subject's sexuality, so respecting Walpole's habitual discretion and the wishes of his brother and sister. He left readers to read between the lines if they wished, in, for example, references to Turkish baths "providing informal opportunities of meeting interesting strangers". Hart-Davis dedicated the book to "Dorothy, Robin and Harold", Walpole's sister, brother, and long-term companion.

In 1972 Elizabeth Steele's study of Walpole was published. Much shorter than Hart-Davis's biography, at 178 pages to his 503, it dealt mainly with the novels, and aimed "to show the sources of Hugh Walpole's success as a writer during the thirty-five years and fifty books of his busy career". Steele concentrated on half a dozen of Walpole's best books, each illustrating aspects of his writing, under the headings "Acolyte", "Artist", "Witness", "Evangelist", "Critic" and "Romanticist". Steele also wrote a study of Walpole's North American lecture tours (2006) and the article on Walpole in the Oxford Dictionary of National Biography (2004), which treats his private life briefly but candidly.

== Notes and references ==
Notes

== Sources ==
- Adcock, Arthur St John (1923). Gods of Modern Grub Street: Impressions of Contemporary Authors (third ed.). London: Sampson Low, Marston. OCLC 221110610.
- Agate, James (1945). A Shorter Ego – The Autobiography of James Agate. London: Harrap. OCLC 556964644.
- Agate, James (1976). Tim Beaumont (ed.). The Selective Ego. London: Harrap. ISBN 0245528490.
- Alexander, Ted; Tatiana Verizhnikova (2003). Ransome in Russia – Arthur's Adventures in Eastern Europe. Fareham, Hampshire: Portchester. ISBN 0954555406.
- Boone, Joseph; Michael Cadden, eds. (2012). Engendering Men (second ed.). London: Routledge. ISBN 041552329X.
- Buitenhuis, Peter (1989) [1987]. The Great War of Words – Literature as Propaganda, 1914–18 and After. London: Batsford. ISBN 0713460660.
- Cartmell, Deborah (2015). Adaptions in the Sound Era : 1927-1937. London: Bloomsbury. ISBN 9781623562021.
- Cooper, Duff (2005). John Julius Norwich (ed.). The Duff Cooper Diaries. London: Weidenfeld and Nicolson. ISBN 0297848437.
- Driberg, Tom (1978) [1977]. Ruling Passions. London and New York: Quartet Books. ISBN 070433223X.
- Edel, Leon, ed. (1984). Letters of Henry James, Volume 4. Cambridge, Massachusetts and London: Harvard University Press. ISBN 067438783X.
- French, R. D. B. (1966). P G Wodehouse. Edinburgh and London: Oliver and Boyd. OCLC 7998766.
- Goldring, Douglas (1920). Reputations – Essays in Criticism. London: Chapman and Hall. OCLC 186949884.
- Graves, Richard Percival (1994). Richard Hughes: A Biography. London: Andre Deutsch. ISBN 0233988432.
- Gunter, Susan E.; Steven H. Jobe (2001). Dearly Beloved Friends – Henry James's Letters to Younger Men. Ann Arbor, Michigan: University of Michigan Press. ISBN 0472110098.
- Hamann, Brigitte (2005) [2002]. Winifred Wagner. London: Granta. ISBN 1862076715.
- Hart-Davis, Rupert (1997) [1952]. Hugh Walpole. Stroud, Gloucestershire: Sutton. ISBN 0750914912.
- Hastings, Selina (2009). The Secret Lives of Somerset Maugham. London: John Murray. ISBN 0719565545.
- Hemingway, Ernest (1987) [1924]. "The Three Day Blow". Complete Short Stories. New York: Scribner. ISBN 0684186683.
- Hopkins, Ernest (1920). Fortitude, 1826–1920 – Hugh Walpole Stumbles upon Priceless Literary Treasure in a San Francisco Book Shop. Los Angeles: John Howell. OCLC 13326286.
- James, Henry (1914). "The New Novel". Notes on Novelists. London: J M Dent. OCLC 671920468.
- Lyttelton, George; Rupert Hart-Davis (1978). Lyttelton/Hart-Davis Letters, Volume 1. London: John Murray. ISBN 071953478X.
- Lyttelton, George; Rupert Hart-Davis (1984). Lyttelton/Hart-Davis Letters, Volume 6. London: John Murray. ISBN 0719541085.
- Maugham, W. Somerset (1950). Cakes and Ale. Modern Library Edition. New York: Random House. OCLC 228969568.
- Newsome, David (1980). On the Edge of Paradise – A C Benson: The Diarist. London: John Murray. ISBN 0719536901.
- Poesio, Giannandrea; Weedon, Alexis (24 March 2016). The Origins of the Broadbrow: Hugh Walpole and Russian Modernism in 1917 (PDF). Laughing and Coping Entertainment in WW1. Luton, England: University of Bedfordshire.
- Pringle, David (1996). St. James Guide to Horror, Ghost and Gothic Writers. London: St. James Press. ISBN 1558622063.
- Souhami, Diana (1999). The Trials of Radclyffe Hall. New York: Doubleday. ISBN 0385489412.
- Steele, Elizabeth (1972). Hugh Walpole. London: Twayne. ISBN 0805715606.
- Steele, Elizabeth (2006). Sir Hugh Walpole and the United States – A Novelist's View of 1919–1936 America. Lewiston, New York: Edwin Mellen Press. ISBN 0773455329.
- Stewart, J. I. M. (1956). "Biography". In Lehmann, John (ed.). The Craft of Letters in England: A Symposium. London: Cresset Press. OCLC 752864196.
- Sutton, Denys (1979). Fads and Fancies. London: Wittenborn Art Books. ISBN 0815009038.
- Walpole, Hugh (1924). The Crystal Box. Glasgow: Glasgow University Press. OCLC 314975519.
- Walpole, Hugh (1932). The Apple Trees – Four Reminiscences. Waltham St Lawrence, Berkshire: Golden Cockerel Press. OCLC 361495.
- Walpole, Hugh (1939). The Herries Chronicle – Rogue Herries, Judith Paris, The Fortress, Vanessa. London: Macmillan. OCLC 1912099.
- Wodehouse, P. G. (1980) [1953]. "Performing Flea – A Self-portrait in Letters". Wodehouse on Wodehouse. London: Hutchinson. ISBN 0091432103.
- Ziegler, Philip (2004). Rupert Hart-Davis, Man of Letters. London: Chatto and Windus. ISBN 0701173203.
