= E. M. Granger Bennett =

Canadian writer

- Born: Ethel Mary Granger; England
- Died: April 19, 1988; Toronto, Ontario, Canada
- Occupations: novelist, non-fiction
- Spouse: Harold Bennett
- Writing career
- Period: 1950s-1960s
- Notable work: Short of the Glory

Ethel Mary (E. M.) Granger Bennett (died April 19, 1988) was a Canadian writer, best known for her Ryerson Fiction Award-winning novel Short of the Glory.

== Biography ==
Born in England as Ethel Mary Granger, she was raised in Collingwood, Ontario. After completing high school, she spent several years teaching in a small two-room elementary school near Collingwood, and writing for the local newspaper, to save money to attend the University of Toronto. She graduated from the university's Victoria College in 1915 with a degree in modern languages. After World War I, she married academic Harold Bennett, who would later go on to become president of Victoria College and Laurentian University.

Bennett taught languages, including French and German, at various institutions including the University of Toronto and the Ontario Ladies' College. She earned her Ph.D. from the University of Wisconsin–Madison in 1931.

She published three historical fiction novels: Land for Their Inheritance (1955), A Straw in the Wind (1958) and Short of the Glory (1960). All three novels dealt with the settlement and development of New France.

Later in life, she took a doctorate in sacred literature from Victoria College.

She died on April 19, 1988, in Toronto, Ontario, at age 96 according to The Globe and Mail or 97 according to the Toronto Star.
