= Gladys Taylor (publisher) =

Canadian writer and publisher (1917–2015)

- Born: Gladys Tall; 1917; Swan River, Manitoba
- Died: May 31, 2015 (aged 97–98); Airdrie, Alberta
- Occupations: novelist, publisher, memoirist
- Writing career
- Period: 1950s–1990s
- Notable works: Pine Roots, The King Tree, Alone in the Australian Outback, Alone in the Boardroom

Gladys Taylor (née Tall; 1917 – May 31, 2015) was a Canadian writer and publisher.

== Biography ==
Born in Swan River, Manitoba, she trained as a teacher in Winnipeg and taught in her hometown for several years before marrying Lorne Taylor in 1940; during World War II, Lorne served in the Canadian Armed Forces while Gladys served in the Canadian Women's Army Corps.

Following the war, the couple moved to Thetford Mines, Quebec. As a mother and housewife, she began writing fiction as a hobby, and won the Ryerson Fiction Award twice in the 1950s for her novels Pine Roots in 1956 and The King Tree in 1958. She also served for several years as editor of Canadian Bookman & Quarterly, the quarterly trade publication of the Canadian Authors Association.

Following her divorce from Lorne at age 50, Taylor moved to Alberta. With few immediate opportunities for work, she placed a classified advertisement to promote her services as an editor. She received a response from a man who was launching a new magazine, Western Leisure, and became an editor and investor in the magazine, eventually buying out her partner and serving as the magazine's publisher. She then expanded her business by acquiring a network of community newspapers, including The Wheel and Deal, the Rocky View Five Village Weekly, the Carstairs Courier and the Airdrie Advance.

In 1977, she went on a driving tour in Australia, publishing the memoir Alone in the Australian Outback in 1984; the book formed the basis for the 1992 film Over the Hill. In 1987, she published Alone in the Boardroom, a memoir of her experience as a woman in business at a time when that was still a relative novelty.

She was also known for her editorials in her newspapers, which were harshly critical of Prime Minister Brian Mulroney and Alberta premier Don Getty. She endorsed the Reform Party of Canada in the 1988 federal election.

She ran as an independent candidate in the 1989 Alberta Senate nominee election, finishing fourth of six candidates.

Taylor's fifth book, Valinda, Our Daughter, was published in 1993. The book tells of the EgyptAir Flight 648 hijacking, with a focus on one of the Canadian passengers.

Taylor died on May 31, 2015, in Airdrie, Alberta.
