= Over the Hill (1992 film) =

- Directed by: George T. Miller
- Written by: Robert Caswell
- Based on: Alone in the Australian Outback by Gladys Taylor
- Starring: Olympia Dukakis; Sigrid Thornton; Derek Fowlds
- Release date: 30 June 1992
- Running time: 99 min.
- Country: Australia
- Language: English

Over the Hill is a 1992 Australian drama film directed by George T. Miller and starring Olympia Dukakis and Sigrid Thornton.

The film was based on Canadian writer and publisher Gladys Taylor's 1984 book Alone in the Australian Outback, a memoir of her 1977 driving trip in Australia. The memoir was adapted by Australian screenwriter Robert Caswell.

== Plot ==
Alma cannot stand to have one more birthday without seeing her estranged daughter, Elizabeth, who lives in Sydney, Australia. But Alma does not fit into her daughter's political-hostess life even for a visit, and she finds more sympathy in her granddaughter. Alma, in a burst of rebellion, buys a supercharged hotrod and sets out on a voyage of self-discovery to Melbourne. Along the way, she meets con artists, gangsters, and a ponytailed white-knight in a camper and she finds not only adventure and romance, but also the courage to go back and face her relationship with her daughter and set it right.

== Cast ==
- Olympia Dukakis as Alma Harris
- Sigrid Thornton as Elizabeth Harris
- Derek Fowlds as Dutch
- Bill Kerr as Maurice
- Steve Bisley as Benedict
- Pippa Grandison as Margaret
- Aden Young as Nick
- Gerry Connolly as Hank
- Alan David Lee as Carlton

== Reception ==
According to Ozmovies: "The film disappeared almost without trace in its short theatrical release and reviewers in the main newspapers in Melbourne paid little attention to it." There were unfavourable reviews in The Age, The Canberra Times, and Variety.

== Box office ==
Over the Hill grossed $87,672 at the box office in Australia.

== See also ==
- Cinema of Australia
