= Born to Kill (1947 film) =

1947 film noir directed by Robert Wise

Born To Kill
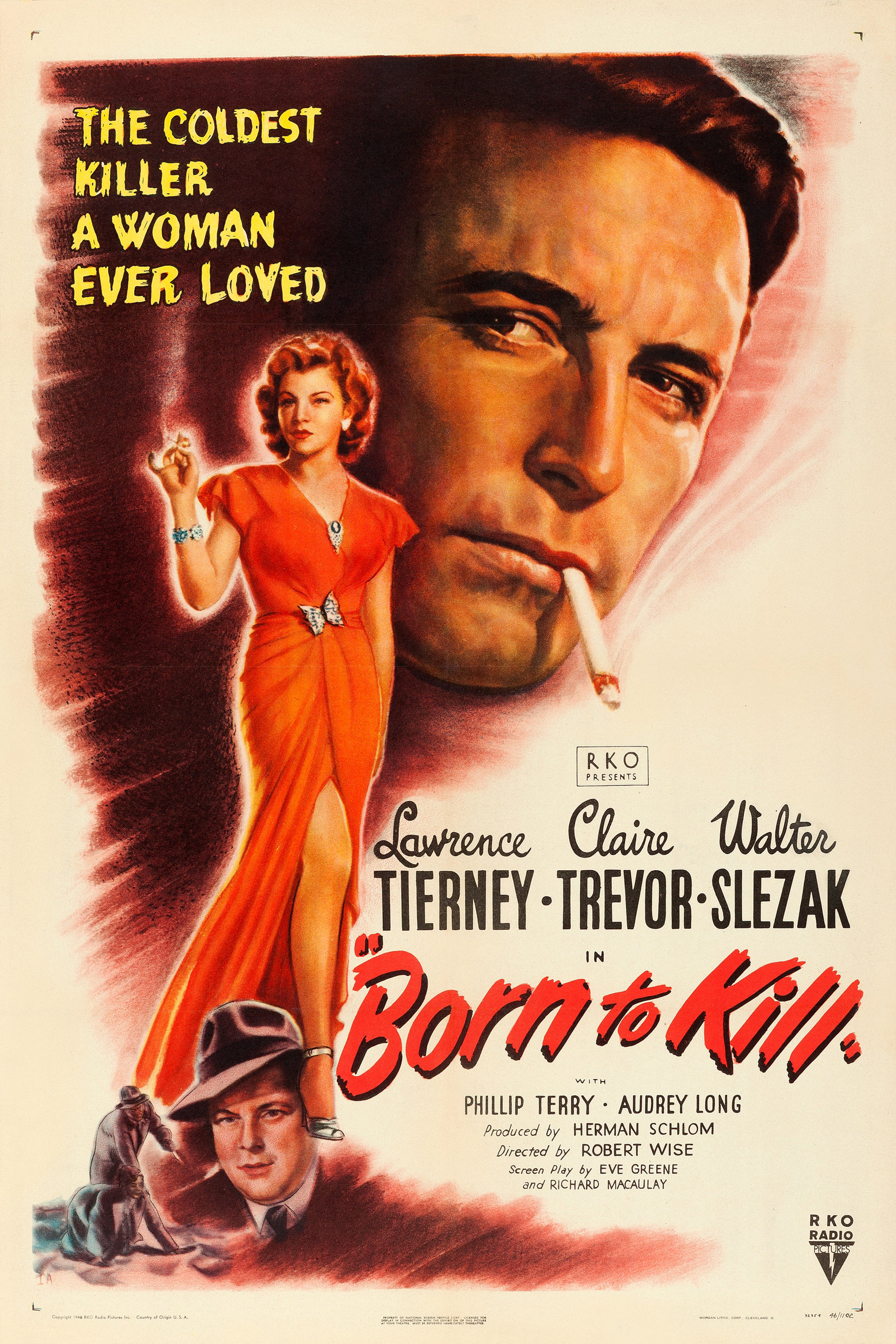
- Theatrical release poster by William Rose
- Directed by: Robert Wise
- Screenplay by: Eve Greene; Richard Macaulay
- Based on: Deadlier Than the Male; 1942 novel by James Gunn
- Produced by: Herman Schlom
- Starring: Lawrence Tierney; Claire Trevor; Walter Slezak; Phillip Terry; Audrey Long
- Cinematography: Robert De Grasse
- Edited by: Les Millbrook
- Music by: Paul Sawtell
- Production company: RKO Radio Pictures, Inc.
- Distributed by: RKO Radio Pictures
- Release date: May 3, 1947
- Running time: 92 minutes
- Country: United States
- Language: English

Born to Kill (released in the U.K. as Lady of Deceit and in Australia as Deadlier Than the Male) is a 1947 RKO Pictures American film noir starring Lawrence Tierney, Claire Trevor and Walter Slezak with Esther Howard, Elisha Cook Jr., and Audrey Long in supporting roles. The film was director Robert Wise's first film noir production, preceding his later work on The Set-Up (1949) and The Captive City (1952).

== Plot ==
San Francisco socialite Helen Brent has established residence in Reno, Nevada to obtain a divorce decree and is lodging in a boarding house owned by the feisty Mrs. Kraft. Helen meets Laury Palmer, a next-door neighbor, and Mrs. Kraft's best friend, who confides that she has accepted a date with a man named Danny to incite jealousy in her new beau, Sam Wilde.

Sam sees them together that evening. Later, he enters Laury's house and confronts Danny. He bludgeons Danny to death and then kills Laury.

Helen discovers the bodies and flees to San Francisco, but does not contact the police. She meets Sam and is attracted to his self-assurance. Neither knows the other's part in the events. Back in Reno, Mrs. Kraft hires private detective Albert Arnett to find Laury's killer.

Several days later, Sam arrives unexpectedly at the mansion where Helen is living. It is owned by Georgia Staples, Helen's wealthy foster sister and the heir to her father's newspaper. Georgia finds Sam attractive, and Sam tells his friend Marty Waterman that he will marry Georgia for her money and the opportunity for higher social standing. Helen is distraught at their wedding.

Helen tells Sam that she loves her sister but hates her for her money, and then Sam kisses her. Marty has traveled to San Francisco for the wedding, and detective Arnett has tailed him there. After he interrogates the staff, Helen reveals information about Sam's activities.

Georgia and Sam fight over his demand to run the newspaper, as she knows that he has no relevant experience. However, he wants the job so that he can manipulate people. He says that Helen understands this because "your roots are down here where mine are" and that they are soulmates. After admitting to Helen that he has not married Georgia for love and, claiming that she has a similar relationship with her fiancé Fred Grover, Sam passionately kisses Helen.

After overhearing a call to Helen from Reno, Sam believes that she is plotting against him, but Helen secretly bribes Arnett to ignore Sam's role in the murders. After Mrs. Kraft travels to San Francisco to meet with Arnett, Marty visits her. He then visits and chats with Helen, but Sam becomes jealous after seeing him leaving her room. Marty arranges to meet Mrs Kraft at the dunes on the outskirts of town, supposedly to give her information about the murder, but in reality with the intention of getting rid of her to save his friend. However, just before Marty can stab her, Sam appears, accuses Marty of betraying him and, despite Marty insisting his talk with Helen was in support of Sam, kills him. Marty's last words are 'You're crazy.'

The police interrogate the household about Marty's murder, and Helen reluctantly provides an alibi for Sam. Helen meets with Mrs. Kraft, who now knows that Sam killed Laury, and threatens her life if she informs the police. A terrified Mrs. Kraft realizes that she must abandon the search for Laury's killer but spits on Helen as she departs.

Helen meets Sam and informs him that she will extract the money to pay Arnett from Fred. However, Fred cancels their engagement, accusing Helen of having lost her heart, and she panics. When Helen cannot pay Arnett, he tells her that the police will soon arrive for Sam. She reveals Sam's murders to Georgia, who refuses to believe her and realizes that Helen did not tell the truth about Sam until she had lost Fred. Georgia angrily accuses Helen of only loving her for her money. To demonstrate that Sam does not love Georgia, Helen ushers Georgia out of sight and kisses him as he enters the room. Helen exclaims to Sam that Georgia must be eliminated for them to be happy. The police arrive, and Georgia reveals that it was Helen who called them. Sam shoots Helen just before he is shot and killed by the police.

The next day, Arnett reads a newspaper headline announcing that Helen was killed by Sam.

== Cast ==
- Lawrence Tierney as Sam Wilde
- Claire Trevor as Helen Brent
- Walter Slezak as Albert Arnett
- Phillip Terry as Fred Grover
- Audrey Long as Georgia Staples
- Elisha Cook Jr. as Marty Waterman
- Isabel Jewell as Laury Palmer
- Esther Howard as Mrs. Kraft
- Kathryn Card as Grace
- Tony Barrett as Danny
- Grandon Rhodes as Inspector Wilson
- Martha Hyer as Maid (uncredited)
- Ellen Corby as Maid (uncredited)
- Jason Robards Sr. as Conductor (uncredited)
- Napoleon Whiting as Porter (uncredited)

== Production ==
Preproduction for the film began in early February 1945, more than two years before its release. RKO hired author Steve Fisher to write a screenplay based on James Gunn's 1943 novel Deadlier Than the Male. By April the studio had replaced Fisher and enlisted screenwriters Eve Greene and Richard Macaulay to compose the script as a team and to manage it through production.

Casting began in August 1945 and Lawrence Tierney was RKO's first choice following his powerful performance in Dillinger, released four months earlier. Although RKO wanted Tallulah Bankhead for the role of Helen Brent, she was unavailable. In January 1946, the part went to Claire Trevor, whose work in the previous year's Murder, My Sweet had impressed studio executives. The working title of the project was still Deadlier Than the Male, which appeared in a series of official release charts. RKO did not officially change the title to Born to Kill for domestic release until December 1946.

Filming began on May 6, 1946, with exterior scenes shot first on location at El Segundo Beach and later in San Francisco. As early as July, it was reported that the film was ready to be scheduled for release. These notices proved premature because the studio experienced delays in arriving at a satisfactory final cut. In October 1946, RKO announced that scheduled November 7 previews at a national trade show and at exchange centers were being postponed. A general release date of November 10, 1946 was postponed as well.

Postproduction problems persisted until the final weeks before the film's distribution to theaters.

== Themes ==
Born to Kill is a rare film noir in that it is shown through a woman's eyes. This female subjectivity enables a more nuanced view of the femme fatale, a central motif in film noir, rather than that which is typical of the genre. Although the archetypical film noir femme fatale's sexuality is often merely a tool to manipulate men for material gain, Helen is a more complicated figure. She is drawn to Sam's brutality although she is also interested in Fred's money. Instead of leading the male protagonist into darkness and ruin, she is compromised by Sam.

== Release ==
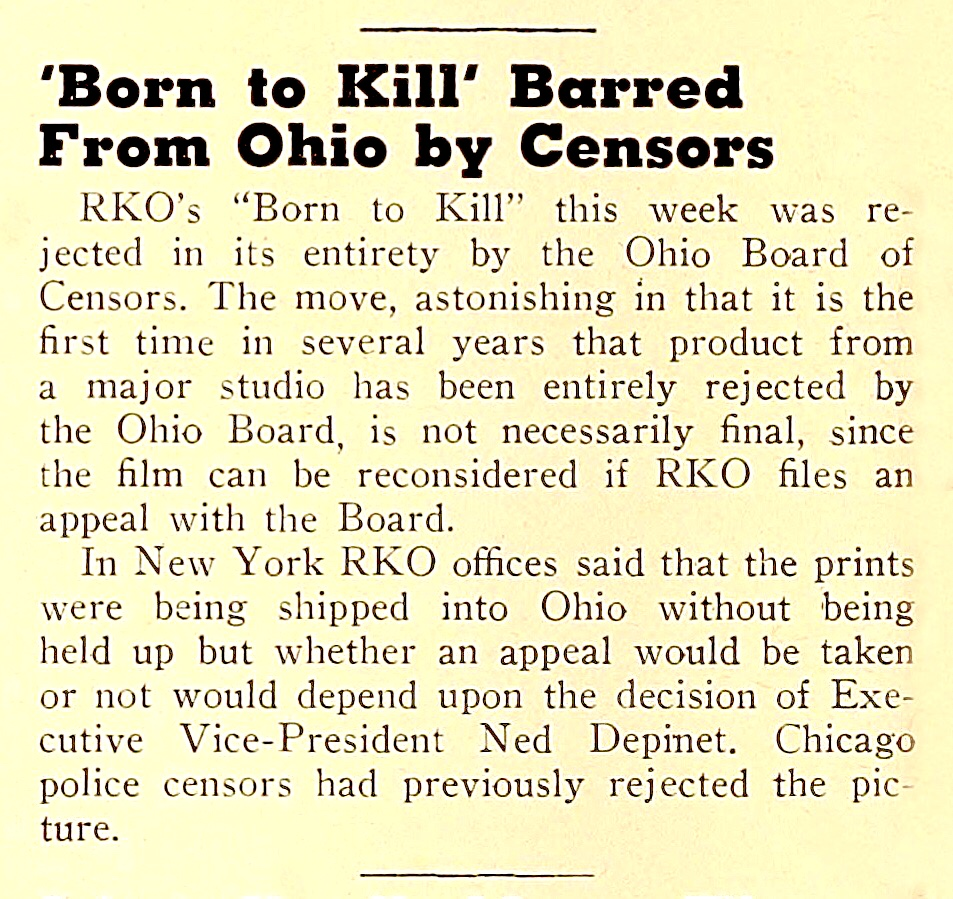
News item in the Showmen's Trade Review, April 12, 1947

On the day before the film's official release, Tierney made headlines for his involvement in a drunken brawl and for violating probation related to an earlier conviction for public drunkenness. Tierney's frequent off-screen troubles also attracted greater scrutiny of his films by state review boards and local censors, some of which sought to ban Born to Kill in their communities.

Censors in places such as Ohio, Chicago and Memphis rejected the film. The National Legion of Decency considered the film objectionable for its acceptance of divorce but did not condemn the film outright.

Although some industry publications predicted box-office success for the film, RKO production head Dore Schary publicly distanced the studio from the film just days after its release. Schary vowed to lessen the "arbitrary use of violence" in RKO films and pledged that the studio would no longer produce "gangster pictures" such as Born to Kill. RKO reported a net loss of $243,000 after the film's initial run.

The furor regarding Born to Kill and the same year's Shoot to Kill prompted the Motion Picture Association of America (MPAA) to revise its Production Code to strengthen restrictions relating to crime films. At a meeting of its board of directors on December 3, 1947, the MPAA voted to bar 14 "'objectionable and unsuitable'" films released between 1928 and 1947 from theatrical reissue, including Born to Kill. The MPAA also approved the immediate deletion from its official title registry of more than two dozen films with titles deemed "salacious or indecent."

In 1948, 12-year-old Howard Lang was convicted for using a switchblade and a piece of concrete to kill a seven-year-old boy outside Chicago the previous year. Lang's lawyers argued that he had watched Born to Kill less than three weeks prior to the homicide and that the film's violence triggered a form of temporary insanity. The Illinois Supreme Court overturned Lang's conviction, finding that he was too young to understand his actions. He was then acquitted following a retrial, but the judge recommended laws to censor violent films and hold theater managers liable for exhibiting them.

== Reception ==
Sam (Lawrence Tierney) attacking Marty (Elisha Cook, Jr.) in a jealous rage

In a contemporary review for The New York Times, critic Bosley Crowther called the film "a smeary tabloid fable" and "an hour and a half of ostentatious vice," concluding: "Surely, discriminating people are not likely to be attracted to this film. But it is precisely because it is designed to pander to the lower levels of taste that it is reprehensible."

Cecelia Ager of PM wrote:

As unsavory and untalented an exhibition of deliberate sensation-pandering as ever sullied a movie screen. RKO made it, the Johnson office [in Hollywood] sanctioned it, the Palace is now playing it. It muddles them all with dishonor...Were Born to Kill merely a third rate picture hoping nevertheless to entertain, it could be passed by with a sigh. But it is third rate aiming—and with a blunderbuss—to shock, and so it provokes shudders, and not of fear.

Irving Kaplan of Motion Picture Daily found "weaknesses in several departments" of "the heavy-handed melodrama" although he focused his attention on the performances of the "tough and ruthless" Tierney and the "captivating and calculating" Trevor:

The picture itself is one of those affairs which winds up with five corpses ... Portrayals generally betray a tendency toward over-acting and grotesque emphasis, perhaps to achieve over-all melodrama, while the dialogue, in spots, appears forced and weighted with flourishes.

The Film Daily cautioned theater owners about the "homicidal drama," describing it as "a sexy, suggestive yarn of crime with punishment, strictly for the adult trade." William R. Weaver of the Motion Picture Herald found the film's overall look "painstaking and polished" and Robert Wise's direction successful in maintaining "a steady pace" but concluded: "Produced for melodrama fans, [the film] contains enough killing for anybody, but furnishes less than adequate reasons for it."

Some modern-day film critics view Born to Kill in a positive light. Author Michael Keaney describes the film as compelling despite its "hard-to-swallow plot," stating: "This one is all Tierney. He's outstanding as one of the most violently disturbed psychos in all of film noir, giving even Robert Ryan in Crossfire a run for his money."

Reviewing the film in 2006 for Slant Magazine, critic Fernando F. Croce focused on Wise:

The usually meek Robert Wise trades his chameleonic tastefulness for full-on, jazzy misanthropy in this nasty melodrama ... Wise swims in the genre's amorality, scoring a kitchen brawl to big-band radio tunes, terrorizing a soused matron at a nocturnal beach skirmish, and leaving the last word to Walter Slezak's jovially corrupt detective.

Writing for Film Monthly in 2009, Robert Weston also praised Wise's direction:

This was the first and the nastiest of the noirs directed by Robert Wise ... Wise came to the genre with a background in the Val Lewton horror team and the expressionistic films of Orson Welles, so he was the right tool for the job when it came to film noir ... As the title suggests, Born to Kill is a film about the grimmest corners of the human condition, the wicked place where sex, corruption and violence join hands and rumba round in darkness.

Director Guillermo del Toro has credited Born to Kill as a primary influence on his 2021 film Nightmare Alley, noting that "a couple of the murders in the movie are shocking, even in 2022."
