= Ryerson Fiction Award =

- Awarded for: unpublished manuscript by a Canadian writer
- Country: Canada
- Presented by: Ryerson Press
- First award: 1942
- Final award: 1960

The Ryerson Fiction Award, also known as the All-Canada Prize, was a Canadian literary award, presented irregularly between 1942 and 1960. Presented by Ryerson Press, the award was given to an unpublished manuscript by a new or emerging writer, which was then published by Ryerson Press, and the prize consisted of $1,000 of which $500 was an advance on royalties.

Although it was considered one of the major Canadian literary awards in its era, few of the winning novels remain well-remembered today. Only five titles which won the award ever went on to a subsequent paperback reprint, with Edward McCourt's Music at the Close the only title that was selected for McClelland & Stewart's New Canadian Library reprint series in the 1970s.

== Statistics ==
Two works, G. Herbert Sallans' Little Man and Philip Child's Mr. Ames Against Time, won both the Ryerson Fiction Prize and the Governor General's Award for English-language fiction in the same year; one other writer, Laura Salverson, won both awards for different works. Three writers — Child, Will R. Bird and Gladys Taylor — won the award twice, although both of Bird's wins and one of Child's were in ties with other writers.

== Winners ==
- 1942 – G. Herbert Sallans, Little Man
- 1943 – no award
- 1944 – no award
- 1945 – (tie) Will R. Bird, Here Stays Good Yorkshire and Philip Child, Day of Wrath
- 1946 – no award
- 1947 – (tie) Edward McCourt, Music at the Close and Will R. Bird, Judgment Glen
- 1948 – no award
- 1949 – Philip Child, Mr. Ames Against Time
- 1950 – Jeann Beattie, Blaze of Noon
- 1951 – no award
- 1952 – no award
- 1953 – Evelyn M. Richardson, Desired Haven
- 1954 – Laura Salverson, Immortal Rock
- 1955 – no award
- 1956 – Gladys Taylor, Pine Roots
- 1957 – Joan Walker, Repent at Leisure
- 1958 – Gladys Taylor, The King Tree
- 1959 – Arthur G. Storey, Prairie Harvest
- 1960 – E. M. Granger Bennett, Short of the Glory
