= Deadlier Than the Male (novel) =

1942 novel

- Author: James Gunn
- Language: English
- Genre: Crime thriller
- Publisher: Duell, Sloan and Pearce
- Publication date: 1942
- Publication place: United States
- Media type: Print

Deadlier Than the Male is a 1942 crime novel by the American writer James Gunn. It was the only published novel of Gunn, better known as a screenwriter. While in Reno to gain her divorce Helen Brent discovers the bodies of two people murdered by Sam Wild. A few days later Wild meets and swiftly marries her wealthy sister Georgia.

== Film adaptation ==
It was adapted into the film noir Born to Kill directed by Robert Wise and starring Lawrence Tierney, Claire Trevor and Walter Slezak. It was produced and distributed by RKO Pictures.

== Bibliography ==
- Goble, Alan. The Complete Index to Literary Sources in Film. Walter de Gruyter, 1999.
- Johnson, Kevin. The Dark Page: Books that Inspired American Film Noir, (1940-1949). Oak Knoll Press, 2007.
- Redding, Arthur. Pulp Virilities and Post-War American Culture. Springer Nature, 2022
