= Blackout in Gretley =

Novel by J.B. Priestley

- First edition
- Author: J.B. Priestley
- Language: English
- Genre: Spy thriller
- Publisher: Heinemann
- Publication date: 1942
- Publication place: United Kingdom
- Media type: Print

Blackout in Gretley is a 1942 spy thriller novel by the British writer J.B. Priestley. The plot revolves around Nazi espionage in an industrial Midlands town.

== Bibliography ==
- Klein, Holger. J.B. Priestley's Fiction. Peter Lang, 2002.
