= The Killer and the Slain =

1942 novel

- First US edition
- Author: Hugh Walpole
- Language: English
- Genre: Gothic Thriller
- Publisher: Macmillan (UK); Doubleday (US)
- Publication date: 1942
- Publication place: United Kingdom
- Media type: Print

The Killer and the Slain is a 1942 novel by the British writer Hugh Walpole, published posthumously following his death the previous year. It recounts in first person narrative the story of a murderer who gradually turns into the man he has killed both morally and physically.

== Abandoned filmed adaptation ==
In 1945 producer Sydney Box announced plans to make a film version of novel, and took the project with him when he was appointed by the Rank Organisation as head of Gainsborough Pictures. A script was commissioned from Bridget Boland while Eric Portman was set to star with Harold French as director. However in May 1947 the Rank board chose to cancel the production, despite the £15,000 already spent, "on the grounds that it was too sadistic and gloomy for present day audiences".

== Bibliography ==
- Spicer, Andrew. British Film Makers: Sydney Box. Manchester University Press, 2006.
