= David Leslie Murray =

British writer and newspaper editor (1888–1962)

- Born: 5 February 1888; London, England
- Died: 1962 (aged 73–74)
- Education: Harrow School
- Alma mater: Balliol College, Oxford
- Known for: Editor, Times Literary Supplement (1938–1945)

David Leslie Murray (5 February 1888 – 1962) was a British writer and editor of the Times Literary Supplement from 1938 to 1945.

== Biography ==
Murray was born in London on 5 February 1888. He was educated at Harrow School and Balliol College, Oxford. Murray first pursued a career in acting before joining staff of the Times Literary Supplement in 1920. In 1962, Murray died from suicide by poison.

== Books ==
- Pragmatism (1912)
- Scenes and Silhouettes (1926)
- Disraeli (1927)
- Trumpeter, Sound! (1934)
- Regency: A Quadruple Portrait (1936)
- Enter Three Witches (1942)
- Folly Bridge: a romantic tale (1945)
