= Alliance of Literary Societies =

Alliance of Literary Societies logo

The Alliance of Literary Societies (ALS) is an umbrella organisation for literary societies mainly based in the United Kingdom.

The Alliance of Literary Societies was founded in 1973, as a result of a campaign to preserve a property associated with Charles Dickens, and has over 120 member societies. Its president is James Naughtie.

The Alliance offers various member benefits: general advice, marketing of its member societies and their events via the ALS website, regular news by email, three newsletters per year, plus an annual journal ALSo.
