= James Gunn (screenwriter, born 1920) =

American screenwriter (1920–1966)

James Edward Gunn (August 22, 1920, San Francisco, California – September 22, 1966, Los Angeles, California) was an American film and television screenwriter and producer. He attended Stanford University.

His credits include Affair in Trinidad, The Young Philadelphians, The Unfaithful, Over-Exposed, Man from 1997 on the television series Conflict, and Because They're Young. Gunn was born in San Francisco in 1920 and was known for his work in hardboiled fiction and crime stories, including the TV detective series 77 Sunset Strip, Checkmate, and Mickey Spillane's Mike Hammer. Earlier, in 1947, RKO Pictures released its controversial crime drama Born to Kill, which was based on Gunn's 1942 work Deadlier Than the Male, his only published novel. He died in Los Angeles in 1966 at the age of 46. James Gunn also created a pilot for a Western series called "Mountain Man", which portrayed the activities and adventures surrounding a Rocky Mountain fur trading station in the 1840s.
