= Enrique Estrázulas =

Uruguayan writer (1942–2016)

Enrique Estrázulas (9 January 1942 - 8 March 2016) was a Uruguayan writer, poet, essayist, playwright, journalist, and diplomat.

Estrázulas was born in Montevideo. His best-known work was the novel Pepe Corvina (1974). He was also Ambassador to Cuba.

== Work ==
Poetry

- El Sótano (1965)
- Fueye (1968)
- Caja de tiempo (1971)
- Confesión de los perros (1975)
- Poemas de amor -Madrigales, Blasfemias (1979)
- Claroscuros (anthology) (2013)

Novels

- Pepe Corvina (1974)
- Lucifer ha llorado (1980)
- El ladrón de música (1982)
- El amante de paja (1986)
- Tango para intelectuales (1990)
- Los manuscritos del Caimán (Sudamericana, Buenos Aires, 2004)
- Espérame Manon (Planeta, Montevideo, 2009)
- El sueño del ladrón (Sudamericana, 2013)

Stories

- Los viejísimos cielos (1975)
- Las claraboyas (1975)
- Cuentos fantásticos (1984)
- Antología personal (1984)
- La cerrazón humana (Seix Barral, Montevideo, 2007)

Essays

- La canción de la mugre (1970)
- Mientras viva un poeta, un ladrón y una puta - an essay about Carlos de la Púa (1970)
- El canto de la flor en la boca (1978)
- Alfredo Zitarrosa, cantar en uruguayo

Plays

- Borges y Perón (1998)
- La puta y el sacristán (2008)
- Gardel en Santamaría (2010)
