= Little Man (novel) =

1942 novel by G. Herbert Sallans

- Author: G. Herbert Sallans
- Publisher: Ryerson Press
- Publication date: 1942
- Publication place: Canada
- Pages: 234

Little Man is a Canadian novel written by G. Herbert Sallans in 1942. It is a coming of age story set in the early part of the 20th century, depicting the life of a young man growing up in the Canadian west. It won the Governor General's award for fiction in 1942. It is semi-autobiographical, following Sallans' own life story up until the release of the novel.

== Plot ==
The story begins in France during World War I. George Battle, a new recruit experiences first hand the concussive experience of trench warfare. What follows is a flashback to his early life growing up in Saskatchewan farm country. Various episodes in Battle's life are portrayed: college, World War I duty in the artillery, a journalist job in British Columbia and finally how his life is affected by the Second World War.

== Awards ==
Little Man won the first Ryerson Fiction Award in 1942. At the time of the award, the prize was worth $500. The judges were: S. Morgan-Powell, chief editor of the Montreal Star; Pelham Edgar, a professor at Victoria College; and Lorne Pierce of Ryerson Press. It later won the Governor General's Literary Award for best fiction novel. The judges were: novelist Alan Sullivan; J. E. Middleton, editor of the Toronto Saturday Night magazine; and Norman Endicott, a professor of English at the University of Toronto.

== Reception ==
The selection of Little Man was viewed by some readers as a poor choice. More popular books included Hardy's All the Trumpets Sounded; Raddall's His Majesty's Yankees; and Campbell's Thorn-apple Tree. Little Man's best attribute was its story of contemporary Canadian life. The novel was not praised for its writing quality or its general structure.

J. R. MacGillivray in his review in the University of Toronto Quarterly, was confused by the title, 'Little Man'. He queried where did it come from? Certainly not in the telling of George Battle's story where he leads a charmed and successful life. MacGillivray praised Sallans for his description and dialogue but said that while his penchant for masculine characters is limited to description and are not given more scope in the novel.
