= G. Herbert Sallans =

Canadian writer and journalist

George Herbert Sallans (April 20, 1895 - November 18, 1960) was a Canadian writer and journalist, whose novel Little Man won the Governor General's Award for English-language fiction and the Ryerson Fiction Award in 1942.

Born and raised in Dufferin County, Ontario, he worked as a journalist for newspapers in Winnipeg, Saskatoon and Vancouver, and as a Canadian correspondent for British United Press before publishing Little Man.
