= Donald Pelmear =

British actor (1924–2025)

- Born: Donald Stanley Morrell Pelmear; 6 July 1924; Middlesbrough, North Yorkshire, England
- Died: 11 January 2025 (aged 100); Hampstead, London, England
- Occupation: Actor
- Years active: 1953–2007 • 2016–2018

Donald Pelmear (6 July 1924 – 11 January 2025) was a British actor on stage and screen. Among his notable performances were Sir Thomas More in A Man for All Seasons in 1961, in Farnham, Salisbury and Southport, and Malvolio in the 1964 production of Twelfth Night which inaugurated the Nuffield Theatre, Southampton. On screen, he may be best known for portraying Professor Joseph Rubeish in the 1973–74 Doctor Who serial The Time Warrior.

== Life and career ==
Pelmear began acting in amateur theatre and then, from 1953, acted in repertory theatre. He did not attend drama school, but learned from watching and listening to other actors. He appeared with theatre companies across England, including the Bristol Old Vic Theatre Company, the Oxford Playhouse Company, and the New Shakespeare Company, and was known for his versatility and flexibility as an actor.

Pelmear enjoyed playing comedy, and critics applauded his comic roles in plays such as The White Sheep of the Family, Separate Rooms and Kafka's Dick, musical comedies such as The Fantasticks and Salad Days. He played various roles in pantomimes, including Aladdin in The Adventures of Aladdin and his Wonderful Lamp and Mole in Toad of Toad Hall.

In the West End, Pelmear played Doc in the 1984/85 revival of West Side Story at Her Majesty's Theatre, and Monsieur Damiens in the 1990/91 production of Anouilh's The Rehearsal at the Almeida Theatre and Garrick Theatre.

He also played many serious roles, including Aslaksen in Ibsen's An Enemy of the People and Lawrence of Arabia in Terence Rattigan's play Ross, a review of which stated "Donald Pelmear is an actor of subtlety and power, who draws a consistent portrait and resists every temptation to overdraw it". His portrayal of Sir Thomas More in A Man for All Seasons was described as "a very sensitive portrayal" and a "warming, human performance of a beautifully realized character", in which "[e]very mood of this great man is faithfully depicted - his gentleness, lowliness, gravity, wit, affability, piety and heroism." Pelmear also appeared in the first play performed at the new Nuffield Theatre, Southampton, playing Malvolio in the Salisbury Arts Theatre Company's production of Twelfth Night; a critic wrote that "Donald Pelmear is an excellent Malvolio who finally leaves his audience torn between pity and aversion."

In December 2005, Pelmear entered a civil partnership with his partner, the actor Max Harvey, who died three months later.

Pelmear died on 11 January 2025, at the age of 100.

== Selected stage performances ==
Year	Title	Author	Theatre	Role	Notes
1953	Will Any Gentleman?	Vernon Sylvaine	Assembly Hall Theatre, Tunbridge Wells	Dr. Smith	Loraine Theatre Company
1953	Relative Values	Noël Coward	Assembly Hall Theatre, Tunbridge Wells		Loraine Theatre Company
1953	The White Sheep of the Family	Lawrence du Garde Peach and Ian Hay	Assembly Hall Theatre, Tunbridge Wells	Vicar	Loraine Theatre Company
1953	The Deep Blue Sea	Terence Rattigan	New Pavilion, Redcar	Mr. Miller, ex-doctor	North Riding Theatre Company
1956	The Duke in Darkness	Patrick Hamilton	Southport	The Duke of Latteraine	Southport Repertory Company
1956	We at the Crossroads	Keith Winter	Southport	Author	Southport Repertory Company
1957	Burdalane	Winifred Bannister	Scala, Southport	Hew Kennedy	Southport Repertory Company
1957	Separate Tables	Terence Rattigan	Scala, Southport	Major Pollock	Southport Repertory Company
1957	My Three Angels	Bella and Samuel Spewack	Scala, Southport		Southport Repertory Company
1958	The Adventures of Aladdin and his Wonderful Lamp	Donald Bodley	Scala, Southport	Aladdin	Southport Repertory Company
1958	Family on Trial	John Wiles	Scala, Southport	Schoolmaster	Southport Repertory Company
1958	Ring for Catty	Patrick Cargill and Jack Beale	Scala, Southport	Len White	Southport Repertory Company
1958	Cuckoo in Clover	Kate Lindsay	Scala, Southport	Richard Cavendish	Southport Repertory Company
1960	The Father	August Strindberg	Castle Theatre, Farnham	Dr. Ostermark	Castle Theatre Repertory Company
1961	The Birthday Party	Harold Pinter	Castle Theatre, Farnham	McCann	Castle Theatre Repertory Company
1961	A Man for All Seasons	Robert Bolt	Castle Theatre, Farnham	Sir Thomas More	Castle Theatre Repertory Company
1961	A Man for All Seasons	Robert Bolt	Kings Theatre, Southsea	Sir Thomas More	Salisbury Arts Theatre
1962	Salad Days	Julian Slade, Dorothy Reynolds	Marlowe Theatre, Canterbury	Ambrose and Police Inspector	Marlowe Theatre Company
1962	The Unexpected Guest	Agatha Christie	Marlowe Theatre, Canterbury	Michael Starkwedder	Marlowe Theatre Company
1962	Separate Rooms	Alan Dinehart and Joseph Carole	Marlowe Theatre, Canterbury	Jim Stackhouse	Marlowe Theatre Company
1963	Ross	Terence Rattigan	Guildford Theatre, Guildford	Lawrence of Arabia	Guildford Theatre Company
1964	Twelfth Night	William Shakespeare	Nuffield Theatre, Southampton	Malvolio	Salisbury Arts Theatre Company
1965	You Never Can Tell	George Bernard Shaw	Phoenix Theatre, Leicester	Walter, the waiter	Phoenix Theatre Company
1965	See How They Run (play)	Philip King	Phoenix Theatre, Leicester	Vicar, Rev. Lionel Toop	Phoenix Theatre Company
1965	The Fantasticks	Harvey Schmidt, Tom Jones	Phoenix Theatre, Leicester	Father	Phoenix Theatre Company
1967	Next Time I'll Sing To You	James Saunders	Swan Theatre, Worcester	The Hermit	Worcester Repertory Company
1968	Juno and the Paycock	Seán O'Casey	Little Theatre, Bristol	Joxer Daly	Bristol Old Vic Theatre Company
1968	Loot	Joe Orton	Little Theatre, Bristol	Inspector Truscott	Bristol Old Vic Theatre Company
1968	A Day in the Death of Joe Egg	Peter Nichols	Little Theatre, Bristol	Freddie	Bristol Old Vic Theatre Company
1969	An Enemy of the People	Henrik Ibsen	Yvonne Arnaud Theatre, Guildford	Aslaksen	Oxford Playhouse Company
1970	Toad of Toad Hall	A. A. Milne, Kenneth Grahame	Oxford Playhouse	Mole	Oxford Playhouse Company
1970	Cat on a Hot Tin Roof	Tennessee Williams	Phoenix Theatre, Leicester	Doctor Baugh	Phoenix Theatre Company
1970	In Celebration	David Storey	Phoenix Theatre, Leicester	Mr Shaw	Phoenix Theatre Company
1970	Narrow Road to the Deep North	Edward Bond	York Theatre Royal	Basho	York Theatre Royal Company
1972	The Tempest	William Shakespeare	Hull New Theatre		New Shakespeare Company
1972	Twelfth Night	William Shakespeare	York Theatre Royal		New Shakespeare Company
1980	The Caretaker	Harold Pinter	The Capitol Theatre, Horsham	Davies the tramp	New Shakespeare Company
1981	Much Ado About Nothing	William Shakespeare	Theatre Royal, Lincoln	Leonato, governor of Messina	New Shakespeare Company
1984–1985	West Side Story	Leonard Bernstein, Stephen Sondheim	Her Majesty's Theatre, London	Doc	
1986	Tristram Shandy	Laurence Sterne, adapted by Peter Buckman	Oxford Playhouse	Uncle Toby	Oxford Playhouse Company
1989	Habeas Corpus	Alan Bennett	Thorndike Theatre, Leatherhead	Dr Arthur Wicksteed	
1990	Pack of Lies	Hugh Whitemore	Belgrade Theatre, Coventry	MI5 Officer	
1990–1991	The Rehearsal	Jean Anouilh	Almeida Theatre, London, then Garrick Theatre, London	Monsieur Damiens	Theatre Division
1998	Kafka's Dick	Alan Bennett	Nottingham Playhouse	Father	

== Partial filmography ==
=== Film ===
Year	Title	Role	Notes
1987	Little Dorit	Mr. Clive	
1998	Elizabeth	Third bishop	
2017	Edie	George	
2018	The Curse of Shalott	Malcolm	Short film

=== Television ===
Year	Title	Role	Notes
1959	ITV Play of the Week	Mr. Green	Episode: "A Man Involved"
1960	BBC Sunday-Night Play	Unknown	
1960	The World of Tim Frazer	Projectionist	1 episode
1961	Gamble for a Throne	Richard Whiteacre	Miniseries - 5 of 6 episodes
1966	Ransom for a Pretty Girl	Willis	Miniseries - 3 of 6 episodes
1967	Coronation Street	Mr. Fitch	Episode: "Episode: #1.684"
1968	Public Eye	Elliot	Episode: "Have Mud, Will Throw"
1969	Special Branch	William Arthur Cowley	Season 1, Episodes 1 + 2
1970	UFO	Estate agent	Episode: "The Square Triangle"
1973–74	Doctor Who	Professor Joseph Rubeish	Serial: The Time Warrior
1976	The Duchess of Duke Street	Major Gutch	Episode: "Plain Sailing"
1981	The Day of the Triffids	University Gateman	Episode: "Part Three"
1982	Yes Minister	Permanent Secretary, DHSS	Episode: "Equal Opportunities"
1983	The Citadel	Dr. Thoroughgood	Episode: "Part 10"
1990	Agatha Christie's Poirot	Judge	Episode: "The Mysterious Affair at Styles"
1991	Paul Merton: The Series	Judge	Episode: "Episode #1.2"
1992	London's Burning	Curator	1 episode
1993	In Suspicious Circumstances	Henry Dobson	Episodes: "Shadow of Doubt" and "The Death of Lucy Kyte"
1998	McCallum	Mr. Weston	Episode: "City of the Dead"
2000	The 10th Kingdom	Court clerk	Miniseries
2000	Lock, Stock...	Captain	Episode: "...And Two Sips"
2001	The Way We Live Now	Doctor	Miniseries
2003	Strange	Mr. Parrish	Episode: "Asmoth"
2003	My Hero	Patient	Episode: "The Mayor of Northolt"
2004	Little Britain	Waiter	Episode: "Episode #2.1"
2006	Hotel Babylon	Mr. Farrah	1 episode

== See also ==
- List of centenarians (actors, filmmakers and entertainers)
