= Whitefriars, Bristol =

Carmelite friary in Bristol, England

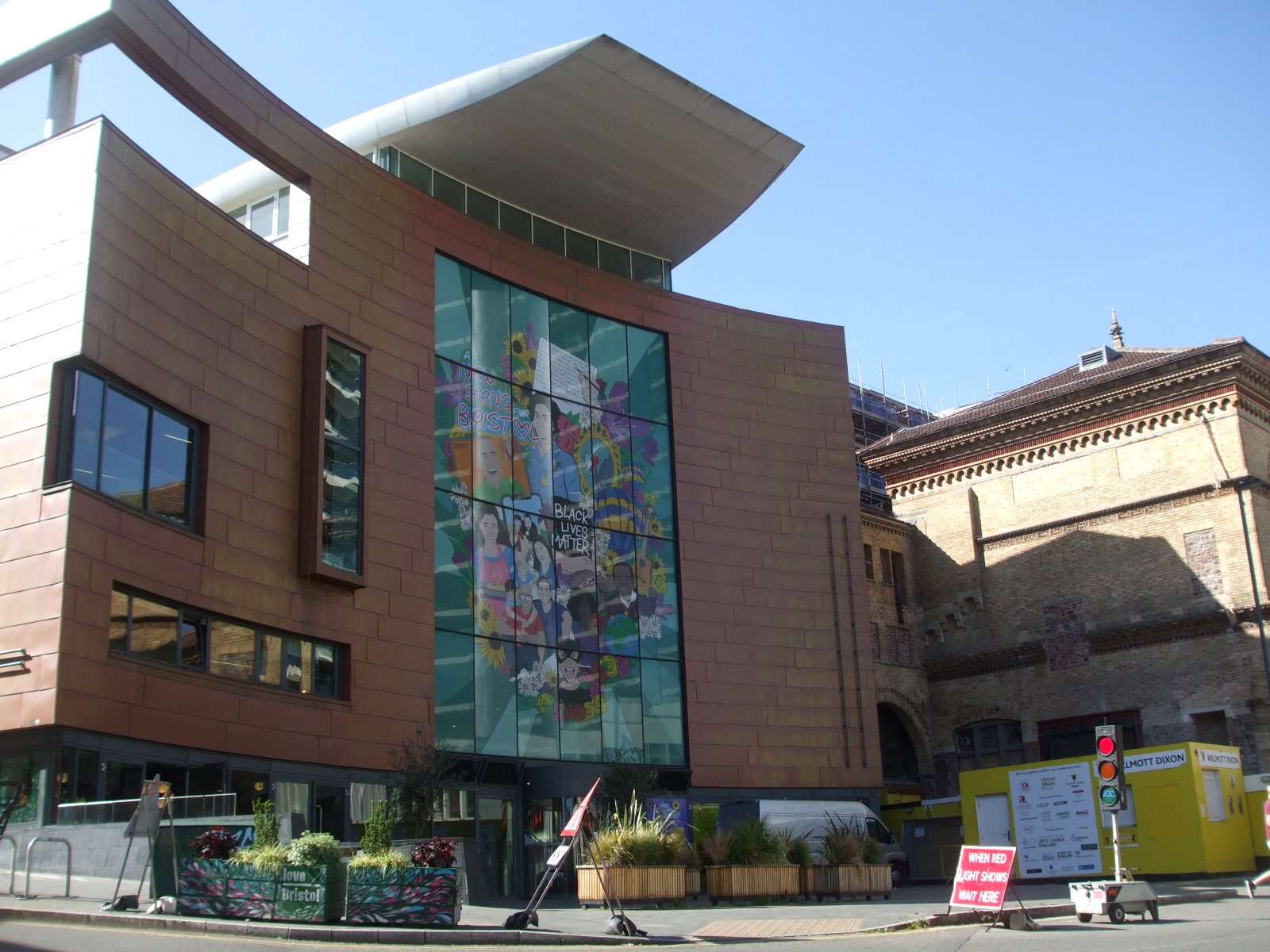
- The former Whitefriars site in 2022, now occupied by the Bristol Beacon

- Location within Bristol

General information
- Architectural style: monastic
- Location: Bristol, England
- Coordinates: 51.454655°N 2.598261°W
- Construction started: 13th century
- Demolished: 16th century

Whitefriars was a Carmelite friary on the lower slopes of St Michael's Hill, Bristol, England. It was established in 1267; in subsequent centuries a friary church was built and extensive gardens developed. The establishment was dissolved in 1538.

Much of the site was then redeveloped by Sir John Young, who built a "Great House" there. This later became a boys' school founded by Edward Colston in the 18th century. The Red Lodge, which survives today as a museum, had its origins as a prospect house for the Prior. The concert venue Colston Hall, renamed in 2020 as the Bristol Beacon, was built on part of the friary site in the 19th century. A 20th-century office block named Whitefriars, built a short distance way, preserves the name.

== History ==
Whitefriars was founded in 1267 by the Prince of Wales, the future king Edward I. The friars, also known as Friars of the Blessed Virgin, wore white habits, hence the name Whitefriars. In the fifteenth century William of Worcester, described the church as having dimensions of 45 by 25 yards (41 m × 23 m), with a tower 200 feet (61 m) high. The friary was described by the antiquary Leyland, writing in the early sixteenth century, as standing on the right bank of the Frome by the quay. He added that it was "the fairest friary in England". The friary had a large expanse of adjoining land extending up St Michael's Hill. This was used for horticulture and the Carmelites sold produce to augment their income.

Writing to Thomas Cromwell in 1538, Richard Yngworth, one of the commissioners or visitors charged with inspecting monastic houses, reported that the contents of the friary only just met the debts owed by the friars. He described a chapel with lead roofing, gardens and a "goodly howse in byldenge, mete for a great man", also a conduit bringing fresh water from Brandon Hill, later taken over by St John's Church. Four remaining friars surrendered their possessions to the commissioner in the presence of the Mayor.

== Post-dissolution ==
Some monastic cells, thought to belong to the friary, survive under the Red Lodge, which had its origins as a prospect house for the prior of Whitefriars. This building became the lodge house of an Elizabethan mansion, the Great House, built in the late 16th century by John Young, who had bought the friary from Bristol Corporation after the Dissolution of the Monasteries. The Great House was where Elizabeth I stayed, as a guest of John Young, in 1574. In the 18th century, the house was acquired by Edward Colston, who established the original Colston's School there. After the school moved to Stapleton in 1857, the Colston Hall Society purchased the premises, and demolished the house to build the Colston Hall, which now occupies the site. Excavations during the building of the adjacent Colston House in the early 20th century found medieval walls, burials and floor tiles. The renaming of the Hall to "Bristol Beacon" (following protests over Colston's links with slavery) was announced on 23 September 2020; Louise Mitchell, chief executive of the Bristol Music Trust, said that the renaming would be "a symbol of hope and community".

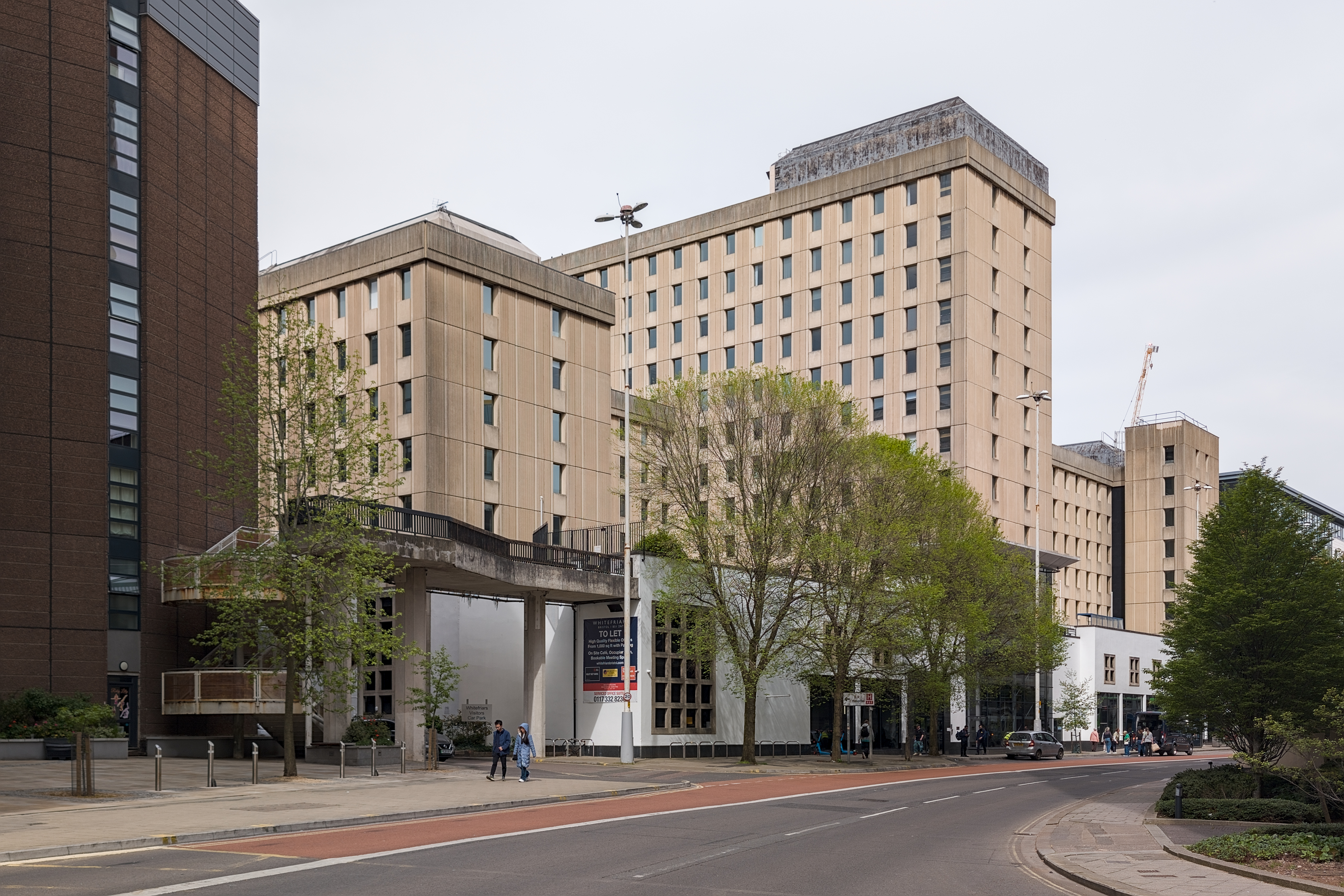
The Whitefriars office building in 2026

As part of the post-war redevelopment of Bristol city centre, the name Whitefriars was given to a large multi-storey office development located in Lewin's Mead, a few hundred yards from the site of the original Whitefriars and adjoining the site of the Greyfriars office complex. The building has thirteen floors and stands 49 metres (161 ft) high. It was completed in 1976.

== Works cited ==
- Dallaway, James; Wyrcestre, William; Nasmith, James (1834). Antiquities of Bristow in the middle centuries; including the topography by William Wyrcestre, and the life of William Canynges. Bristol: Mirror Office.
- Weare, George Edward (1893). A Collectanea relating to the Bristol Friars Minors (Gray Friars) and their convent: together with a concise history of the dissolution of the houses of the four orders of mendicant friars in Bristol. Bristol: W. Bennett.
