= Jack Hulbert =

British actor, director, screenwriter and singer (1892–1978)

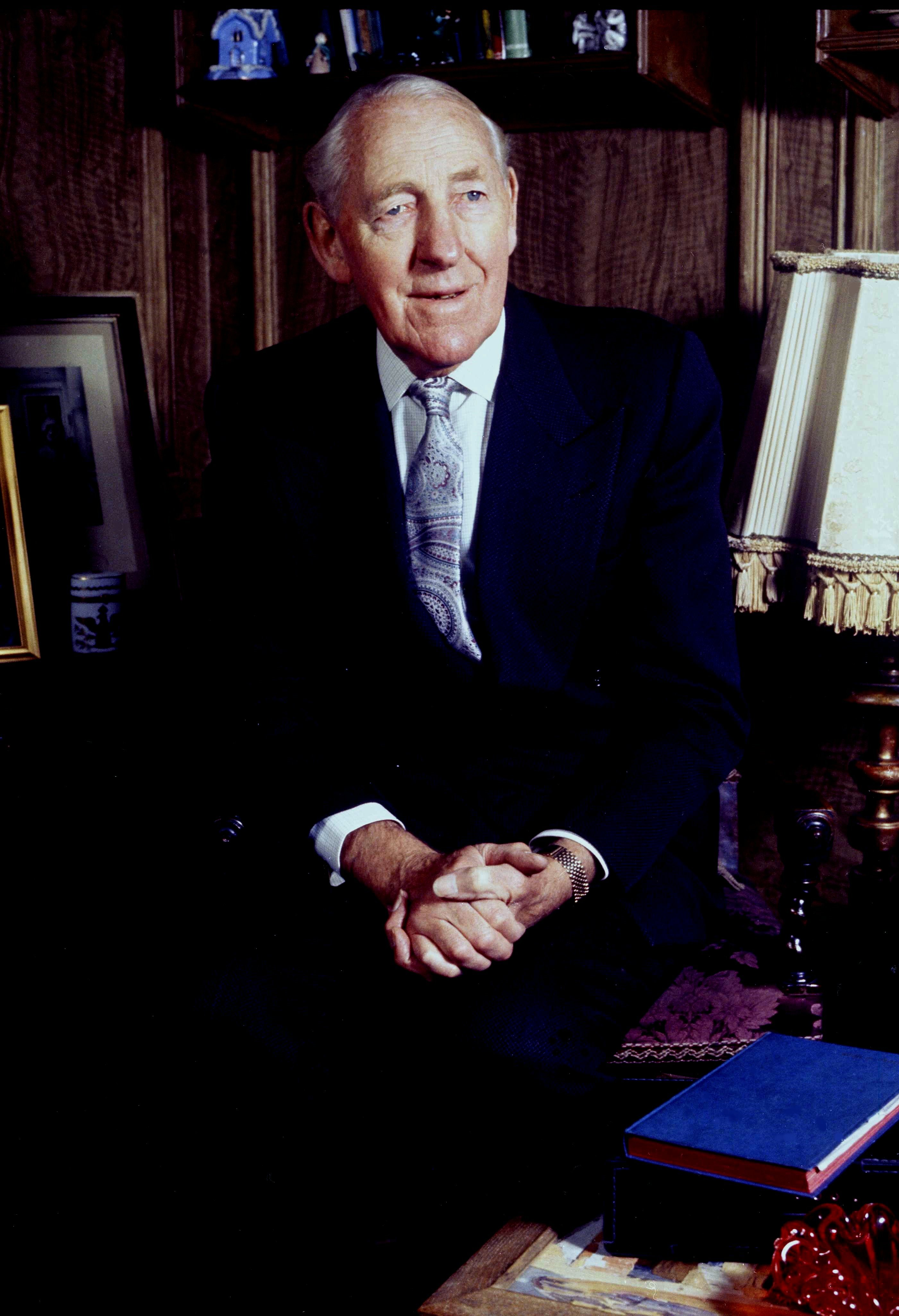
- Portrait by Allan Warren
- Born: John Norman Hulbert; 24 April 1892; Ely, Cambridgeshire, England
- Died: 25 March 1978 (aged 85); London, England
- Occupations: Actor; director; writer; singer
- Years active: 1912–1973
- Spouse: Cicely Courtneidge (m. 1916)

John Norman Hulbert (24 April 1892 – 25 March 1978) was a British actor, director, screenwriter and singer, specializing primarily in comedy productions, and often working alongside his wife (Dame) Cicely Courtneidge.

Jack Hulbert

== Biography ==
Born in Ely, Cambridgeshire, he was the elder and more successful son of Henry Harper Hulbert, a physician, being the brother of the actor Claude Hulbert. He was educated at Westminster School and Gonville and Caius College, Cambridge, and appeared in many shows and revues, mainly with the Cambridge Footlights. He was one of the earliest famous alumni of the comedy club.

After Cambridge, he earned recognition and fame performing in musicals and light comedies. However the First World War delayed his rise to fame; on 14 February 1916, while still an actor, he married Cicely Courtneidge, the daughter of Robert Courtneidge, a theatrical manager, in Hampstead. In June 1916 Hulbert and Courtneidge were appearing together in a sketch called “A Lucky Mistake”, and in December 1916 he was appearing at the Comedy Revue in "See-Saw". In May 1917, he opened at the Comedy in "Bubbly", and the Illustrated Sporting and Dramatic News commented that "Mr. Jack Hulbert, Miss Winnie Melville, and Miss Irene Greville also stay on at this same munition factory for high explosives of laughter". Under the Military Service Act 1916 Hulbert was conscripted into the army, serving from 1917 to 1919. After the war, he continued his career in the theatre.

Hulbert made his film debut in Elstree Calling (1930); appearing opposite his wife and frequent stage and screen co-star Cicely Courtneidge. His career went through a successful period during the 1930s when he appeared in several films, including The Ghost Train (1931), Love on Wheels (1932) and Bulldog Jack (1935), a tongue-in-cheek homage to the popular Bulldog Drummond films in which Jack was supported by his brother Claude.

In 1931 Courtneidge and Hulbert suffered a serious setback when they discovered that their financial manager had been speculating with their money, suffering heavy losses and putting their business into liquidation. Hulbert accepted responsibility for all the business's debts and undertook to repay every creditor.

He had a hit record in 1932 "The Flies Crawled Up the Window", which was originally sung in the film Jack's the Boy. In 1934 he was voted the most popular male British star at the box office.

In 1936 exhibitors voted him the third most popular British film star.

Hulbert's popularity waned as the 1930s came to an end, and after the war he and his wife continued to entertain chiefly on stage. In 1951 he appeared in the West End in The White Sheep of the Family and the following year directed his brother in Lord Arthur Savile's Crime. In 1958 he starred with Yvonne Arnaud in Ronald Millar's The Big Tickle. In 1962 he appeared in the BBC radio sitcom Discord in Three Flats, along with Courtneidge and Vic Oliver.

== Personal life ==
His marriage to Cicely Courtneidge lasted for 62 years until his death. Their relationship is mentioned in the British television series Dad's Army in the episode Ring Dem Bells when Hulbert pulls out of shooting a Home Guard training film to spend time with his wife.

In 1975, Hulbert published his autobiography, The Little Woman's Always Right. Hulbert died, at the age of 85, at his home in Westminster, London on 25 March 1978.

== Filmography ==
=== Film ===
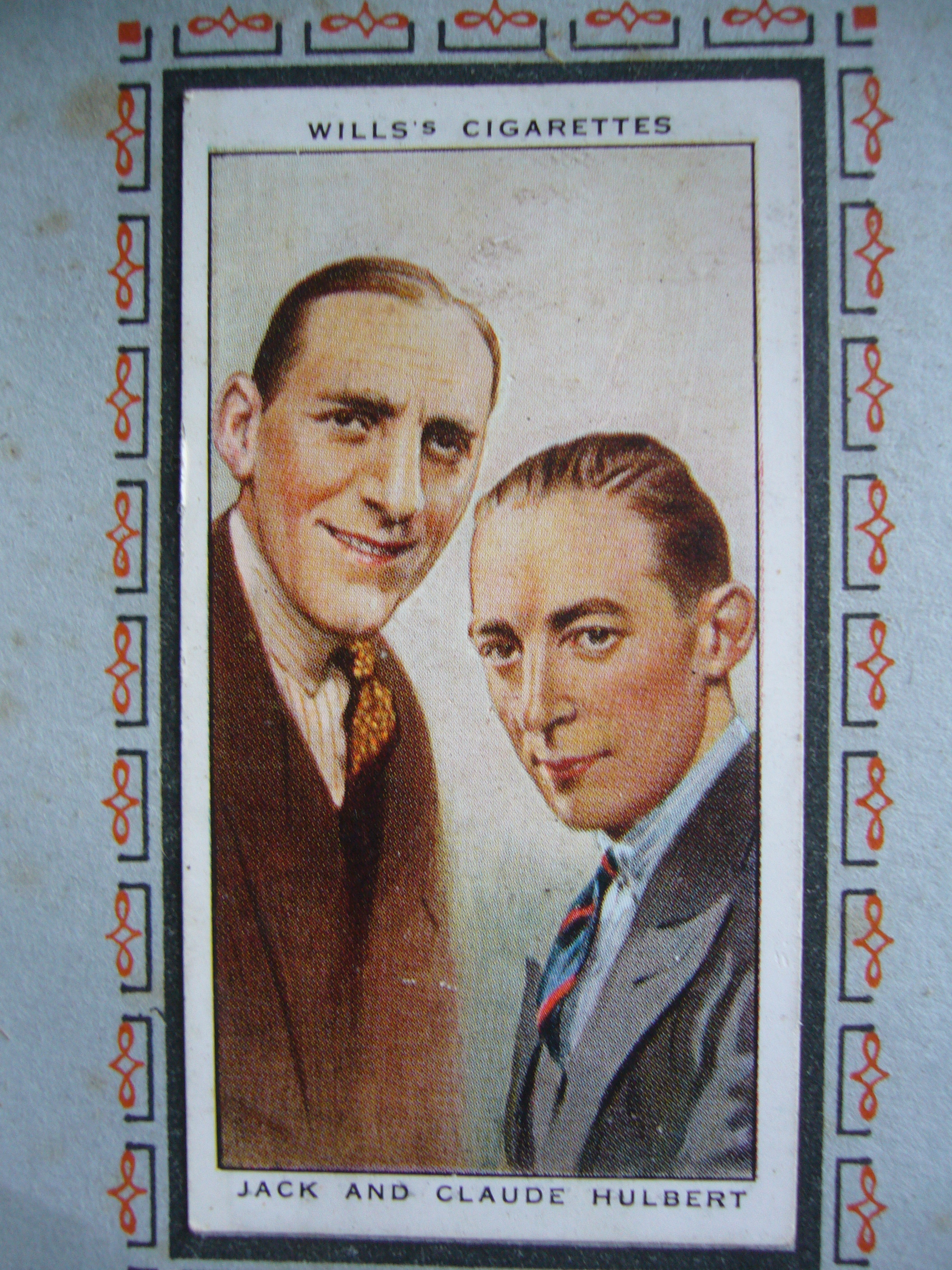
Photo of card in Wills's cigarette album circa 1934

Year	Title	Role	Notes
1930	Elstree Calling	Himself	His film debut
1931	The Ghost Train	Teddy Deakin	
1931	Sunshine Susie	Herr Hasel	Released as The Office Girl in USA
1932	Jack's the Boy	Jack Brown	Released as Night and Day in USA
1932	Happy Ever After	Willie	Released as A Blonde Dream in USA
1932	Love on Wheels	Fred Hopkins	
1933	Falling for You	Jack Hazeldon	
1934	Jack Ahoy	Jack Ponsonby	
1934	The Camels Are Coming	Jack Campbell	
1935	Bulldog Jack	Jack Pennington	Released as Alias Bulldog Drummond in USA
1936	Jack of All Trades	Jack Warrender	Alternative title: The Two of Us
1937	Take My Tip	Lord George Pilkington	
1937	Paradise for Two	Rene Martin	Released as Gaiety Girls in USA
1938	Kate Plus Ten	Inspector Mike Pemberton	Released as Queen of Crime in USA
1940	Under Your Hat	Jack Millett	
1950	Into the Blue	John Fergusson	Released as Man in the Dinghy in USA
1951	The Magic Box	1st Holborn Policeman	
1955	Miss Tulip Stays the Night	Constable Feathers	Released as Dead by Midnight in USA
1960	The Spider's Web	Sir Rowland Delahaye	
1973	Not Now Darling	Commander Frencham	
1974	The Cherry Picker	Sir Hugh Fawcett	

=== Television ===
Year	Title	Role	Notes
1951	The Golden Year	John Radlett	Musical play for BBC TV
1961	Kraft Mystery Theater – "The Spider's Web"		TV Episode
1962	Compact	Smith	TV series
1970	Party Games		(TV) - Waiter

== Theatre ==
Year	Title	Theatre	Notes
1913	The Pearl Girl	Shaftesbury Theatre	with Cicely Courtneidge
1921	Pot Luck!	Vaudeville Theatre, London	
1921	Ring Up	Vaudeville Theatre, London	
1924	Second Little Revue Starts at Nine	Little Theatre	
1925	By The Way	Apollo Theatre and Shaftesbury Theatre	Revue
1926	By The Way	Gaiety Theatre, London	with Cicely Courtneidge
1926-27	Lido Lady	Gaiety Theatre, London	
1927-29	Clowns in Clover	Adelphi Theatre and Strand Theatre	with Cicely Courtneidge
1930	Follow A Star	Liverpool Empire	with Sophie Tucker
1951-52	The White Sheep of the Family	Piccadilly Theatre	with Rona Anderson
1952	Lord Arthur Savile's Crime	Royal Court Theatre	Director, with Claude Hulbert, Peter Haddon
1958	The Big Tickle	Duke of York's Theatre	with Yvonne Arnaud
1959	Not in the Book	Touring	With David Conville
1960	The Bride Comes Back	Vaudeville Theatre, London	Cicely Courtneidge, Jack Hulbert
1973	The Hollow	Everyman Theatre, Cheltenham	with Cicely Courtneidge
1974	Breath of Spring	Everyman Theatre, Cheltenham	with Cicely Courtneidge
1976	Once More With Music	Theatre Royal, Brighton	with Cicely Courtneidge

== Bibliography ==
- Green, Stanley. (2009). Encyclopedia of the Musical Theatre. Da Capo Press
- Wearing, J. P. (2014). The London Stage 1920-1929: A Calendar of Productions, Performances and Personnel. Rowman & Littlefield Education (2nd edition)
- Landy, Marcia. (2014). British Genres: Cinema and Society, 1930-1960. Princeton University Press
- Hartley, Cathy. (2013). A Historical Dictionary of British Women. Routledge
