= The Flies Crawled Up the Window =

1932 song

Song by Jack Hulbert
- Released: 1932
- Songwriter(s): Vivian Ellis

"'The Flies Crawled Up the Window" is a British song originally sung by the actor Jack Hulbert in the 1932 comedy film Jack's the Boy. The lyrics describe the antics of various flies as they crawl up windows. In the film it is sung by Hulbert's character, Jack Brown, to his disapproving father (Peter Gawthorne) after he has returned drunk from an evening out.

The film proved to be a major success, and the song was equally popular. Hulbert was pursued to the South of France by His Master's Voice who persuaded him to release it as a record. The song was later covered by other singers such as Pat O'Malley - sometimes with additional verses added.

== Bibliography ==
- Mundy, John. The British Musical Film. Manchester University Press, 2007.
- Sutton, David. A Chorus of Raspberries: British film comedy 1929-1939. University of Exeter Press, 2000.
