= The lady's not for turning =

1980 Margaret Thatcher speech

"The lady's not for turning" was a phrase used by Margaret Thatcher, then Prime Minister, in her speech to the Conservative Party Conference on 10 October 1980. The term has thus been applied as a name to the speech in its entirety. It is considered a defining speech in Thatcher's political development, becoming something of a Thatcherite motto.

The phrase made reference to Thatcher's refusal to perform a "U-turn" in response to opposition to her liberalisation of the economy, which some commentators as well as her predecessor as Conservative leader Edward Heath had urged, mainly because unemployment had risen to 2 million by the autumn of 1980 from 1.5 million the previous year and the economy was in recession, with unemployment exceeding 3 million by the time the recession ended in 1982.

It was written by the playwright Sir Ronald Millar, who had been Thatcher's speech-writer since 1973, and was a pun on the 1948 play The Lady's Not for Burning by Christopher Fry, although Thatcher missed the reference herself. Millar had intended the "you turn if you want to" line, which preceded it, to be the most popular, and it received an ovation itself, but it was "the lady's not for turning" that received the headlines.

The speech as a whole was very warmly received at the conference, and received a five-minute standing ovation.

== Excerpt ==
If our people feel that they are part of a great nation and they are prepared to will the means to keep it great, then a great nation we shall be, and shall remain. So, what can stop us from achieving this? What then stands in our way? The prospect of another Winter of Discontent? I suppose it might.

But I prefer to believe that certain lessons have been learned from experience, that we are coming, slowly, painfully, to an autumn of understanding. And I hope that it will be followed by a winter of common sense. If it is not, we shall not be diverted from our course.

To those waiting with bated breath for that favourite media catchphrase, the 'U-turn', I have only one thing to say: 'You turn if you want to. The lady's not for turning!' I say that not only to you but to our friends overseas and also to those who are not our friends.

== See also ==
- Read my lips: no new taxes – Political catchphrase
