= Jack's the Boy =

1932 film

- Opening title card
- Directed by: Walter Forde
- Written by: W. P. Lipscomb; Sidney Gilliat
- Based on: a story by Jack Hulbert; Douglas Furber
- Produced by: Michael Balcon
- Starring: Jack Hulbert; Cicely Courtneidge; Peter Gawthorne
- Cinematography: Leslie Rowson
- Edited by: Ian Dalrymple; John Goldman
- Music by: Vivian Ellis; Jack Beaver; Lyrics: Douglas Furber; Musical director: Louis Levy
- Production company: Gainsborough Pictures
- Distributed by: Gaumont British
- Release date: June 1932
- Running time: 91 minutes
- Country: United Kingdom
- Language: English
- Box office: $500,000 (est. for UK)

Jack's the Boy (U.S. title: Night and Day) is a 1932 British comedy film directed by Walter Forde and starring Jack Hulbert, Cicely Courtneidge, Francis Lister and Peter Gawthorne. It was written by W. P. Lipscomb and Sidney Gilliat.

The film became well known for its song "The Flies Crawled Up the Window", sung by Hulbert, which was released as a record and was a major hit.

== Plot ==
Policeman Jack attempts to track down a gang responsible for a smash and grab raid, thereby proving his worth to his disapproving father, a Scotland Yard detective.

== Cast ==
- Jack Hulbert as Jack Brown
- Cicely Courtneidge as Mrs Bobday
- Winifred Shotter as Ivy
- Francis Lister as Jules Martin
- Peter Gawthorne as Mr Brown
- Ben Field as Mr Bobday
- Charles Farrell as Martin
- O. B. Clarence as Tompkins
- Hal Gordon as man with scarf at accident
- Arthur Rigby as Police Constable

== Reception ==
The film was voted the fourth best British movie of 1932.

Film Weekly wrote: "Jack Hulbert makes a great success of his first individual comedy 'vehicle' against considerable odds. Not that his style is cramped by lack of opportunities. Far from it. He is allowed to play the gentlemanly clown, the lovelorn fool, and the crazy-footed dancer to his own and the audience's heart's content. It is not his fault that the film ponders too long over comedy points which lose by emphasis, wanders wanders from more or less straight comedy to musical farce, and flags now and then in its pace and sparkle. A good film editor with a serviceable pair of scissors could improve Jack's the Boy a lot."

Kine Weekly wrote: "An excellently staged, tuneful, and attractively and competently cast comedy extravaganza, which, despite its length and occasional moments of tedium, gains sufficient momentum through the resourceful fooling of Jack Hulbert and versatility of Cicely Courtneidge to carry it along at a merry gait."

TV Guide wrote that though the "Dialog drags a bit, as though it's being read for the stage. Hulbert saves his performance with a lot of likable char."

Screenonline noted that "Jack's the Boy is acknowledged as one of the team's best films."
