= The Big Tickle =

Comedy play by Ronald Millar (1958)

- Original language: English
- Written by: Ronald Millar
- Genre: Comedy

Premiere
- Date: 7 April 1958
- Place: Theatre Royal, Brighton

The Big Tickle is a 1958 comedy play by the British writer Ronald Millar. A respectable woman who finds herself short of money, turns to robbery.

It premiered at the Theatre Royal, Brighton before beginning a 27 performance run at the Duke of York's Theatre in London's West End between 23 May and 14 June 1958. The cast included Jack Hulbert, Yvonne Arnaud, Bernard Cribbins and Peter Bayliss.

== Bibliography ==
- Wearing, J.P. The London Stage 1950–1959: A Calendar of Productions, Performers, and Personnel. Rowman & Littlefield, 2014.
