= Frieda (play) =

- Written by: Ronald Millar
- Original language: English
- Genre: Drama

Premiere
- Date premiered: 18 February 1946
- Place premiered: Theatre Royal, Brighton

Frieda is a 1946 play by the British writer Ronald Millar.

It was first performed at the Theatre Royal, Brighton before transferring to the Westminster Theatre where it ran for 132 performances from 2 May to 24 August 1946.

The following year it was adapted by Ealing Studios into a film of the same name directed by Basil Dearden and starring Mai Zetterling and David Farrar.

== Bibliography ==
- Goble, Alan. The Complete Index to Literary Sources in Film. Walter de Gruyter, 1999.
- Wearing, J.P. The London Stage 1940-1949: A Calendar of Productions, Performers, and Personnel. Rowman & Littlefield, 2014.
