= Knot garden =

English garden style

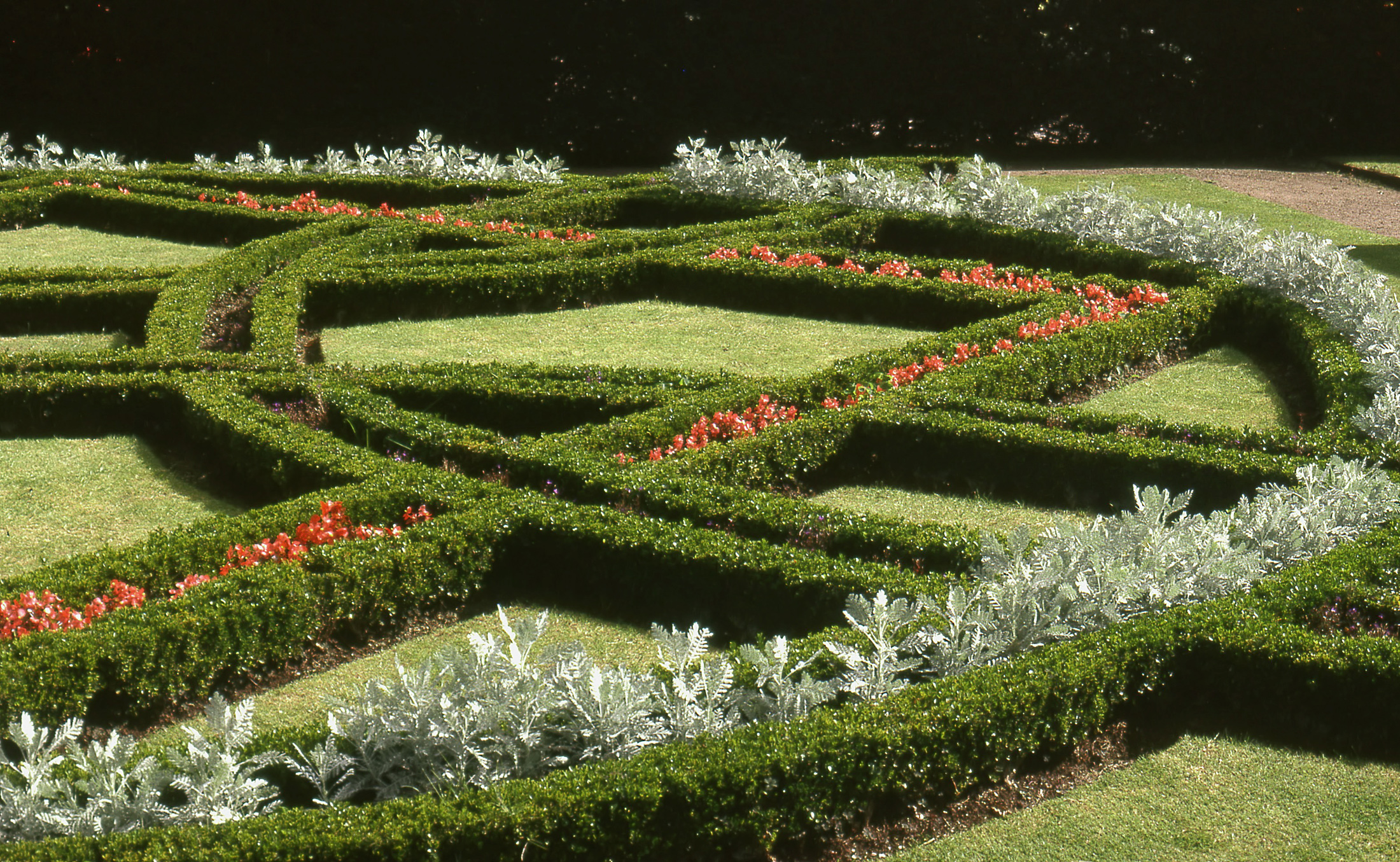
Knot Garden at St Fagans museum of country life, south Wales

A knot garden is a garden style that was popularized in 16th century England and is now considered an element of the formal English garden. A knot garden consists of a variety of aromatic and culinary herbs, or low hedges such as box, planted in lines to create an intertwining pattern that is set within a square frame and laid on a level substrate. The spaces between these lines are often filled with stone, gravel, sand or flowering plants. Traditional plants used in knot gardens include germander, marjoram, thyme, southernwood, lemon balm, hyssop, costmary, acanthus, mallow, chamomile, rosemary, calendula, viola and santolina.

Most knot gardens now have edges made from box (Buxus sempervirens), which is easily cut into dense miniature hedges, and stays green during winters when not all of the "filling" plants are visible or attractive. However, the original designs of knot gardens did not use low box hedges until the late 17th century.

Historically, knot gardens were located close to English manor houses so that the inhabitants and guests would have a bird's eye view of the intricate designs from the upper story windows. Most gardens were composed of square compartments set within frames. A small garden might consist of one compartment, while large gardens might contain six or eight compartments. The interior knot pattern could be composed of bands of plants in contrasting colours which are hedged to look like they weave over and under each other. In which case, the knot is referred to as "closed". When knots have bands of plants that do not appear to be interlacing, they are referred to as "open".

The term knot garden is closely tied to the term parterre. During the 17th century, these terms were used interchangeably as they often are today. A knot garden, however, technically refers to a garden designed with an interweaving pattern whereas "parterre" is a later French term that refers to all formal arrangement of beds.

== History ==
=== Early Influences ===
The first occurrence of the term knot garden appears in the Italian text Hypnerotomachia Poliphili which was printed by Aldus Manutius in 1499. This reference and the general trend towards incorporating Italian styles into English gardens of the period suggests that knot gardens developed from the concept of the hedge maze, a popular Italian garden feature of the renaissance period.

The incorporation of the knot motif likely arose from a variety of influences. Knots were a key theme in the art of medieval England and can be seen in a range of media prior to their incorporation into the garden, such as on embroidery, carpets, metalwork, Celtic crosses, leatherwork, and paintings. This knot motif likely also had Italian origins before its use in gardens. Many early English knots have designs similar to those developed in Italy during the Byzantine period and are closely associated to the introduction of Christianity in England. The close association to knot gardens and Christian symbology may also explain the use of a square frame as a representation of the heavenly plane on earth.

=== The Early Tudor Period (1485–1558) ===
This time period marks the introduction and popularization of the knot garden in England. There is little information on the development of these gardens however, as there is currently no surviving archaeological remains of knot gardens from this period nor in-depth written descriptions of them until the mid 1500s. The numerous quotations that mention knot gardens in the early 1500s within later gardening history books however, indicate their early introduction into fashionable English gardens.

From the surviving evidence, scholars have surmised the general features of knot gardens in this period. They were planted exclusively in low growing herbs and flowering herbaceous perennials that were clipped to maintain the shape of the frame and knot. The designs for complex garden knots were likely employed from books of embroidery patterns. Knot gardens seem to be highly fashionable during this period, with records suggesting that they were used in the finest gardens of England including at Hampton Court during the reign of King Henry VIII.

=== Late Tudor and Early Stuart Period (1558–1625) ===
This period saw the widespread use of knot gardens throughout England which established the knot garden as an element of formal English gardening. The garden book, A Most Briefe and Pleasaunt Treatyse, written by Thomas Hill in about 1558, preserves the first depiction of a Tudor garden. The garden features a knot pattern as the center-piece to a larger, symmetrical square garden that is enclosed on all sides by a trellis fence. This indicates that knot gardens were being used as garden features within a larger design as well being the sole feature of the garden as seen on other contemporary images. This is the first reference to singular knot patterns acting as compartments alongside other garden compartments. Hill's later book, The Gardener's Labyrinth, provides twelve knot designs for copying in gardens and its frequent republishing over the course of the century indicates the popularity of establishing knot gardens during this period. The knot patterns surviving in text and archaeological records from this period could be highly complex and they were always symmetrical and set within a square frame.

Numerous written accounts specifically advised against using boxwood for knot gardens in preference for more highly scented herbs. Thus it is known that boxwood was not present in English knot gardens until the early seventeenth century. In 1613, the garden writer, Gervase Markham, indicates that knot gardens were beginning to be replaced with more French styles which included a more widespread use of boxwood, the replacement of intertwining knots with embroidery patterns, and a simplification of compartments, but he states that these gardens were considered novelties.

=== Middle to Late Stuart Period (1625–1714) ===
The Middle to Late Stuart Period saw a gradual loss in the popularity of the English knot garden of the Tudor and Early Stuart Periods. This occurred in conjunction with the growing popularity of French styled embroidery designs, the most famous of which can be seen in the parterres of Versailles. There were a number of stylistic adaptations to knot gardens in England during the seventeenth century that marked a change from the Elizabethan era.

First, there was a growing interest among the English in botanical exploration which saw the incorporation of more plant varieties in knot gardens and a greater range of bloom colours. Open knots were considered the best for showcasing these blooms, as they could be planted in mass in the interior spaces as described in a garden book from 1629. Thus, there is a gradual decline in the use of closed knots and interweaving patterns.

Second, there is shift towards boxwood as the preferred plant for creating knot patterns. The book, Paradisi in Sole Paradisus Terrestis, also provides the first English recommendation for boxwood as the preferred plant for knot and parterre designs and from this point it is seen throughout gardens of England.

Third, there are some deviances from the previously strict square shape of the garden frame. Change from traditional knot gardens to French parterres gradually occurred throughout this period with parterres and knot gardens both being published in gardening books and established in estates throughout England. The traditional design features of knot gardens were slowly blended with the newer French styles until they fall completely out of use at the end of the seventeenth century.

A similar pattern is also seen in the terminology used for both garden styles. At the beginning of the century, the terms knot garden and parterre were used interchangeably with parterres considered to be equivalent to knot gardens. The term parterre then became popularized throughout Europe with the publication of Le Thrésor des Parterres de L’Univers by D. Loris which was published in Geneva in 1629 and the term came to distinguish the two distinct styles. Then as the styles began to blend in the late 17th century, the terms knot and parterre were use interchangeably until the term knot garden fell completely out of popular use.

== Examples ==
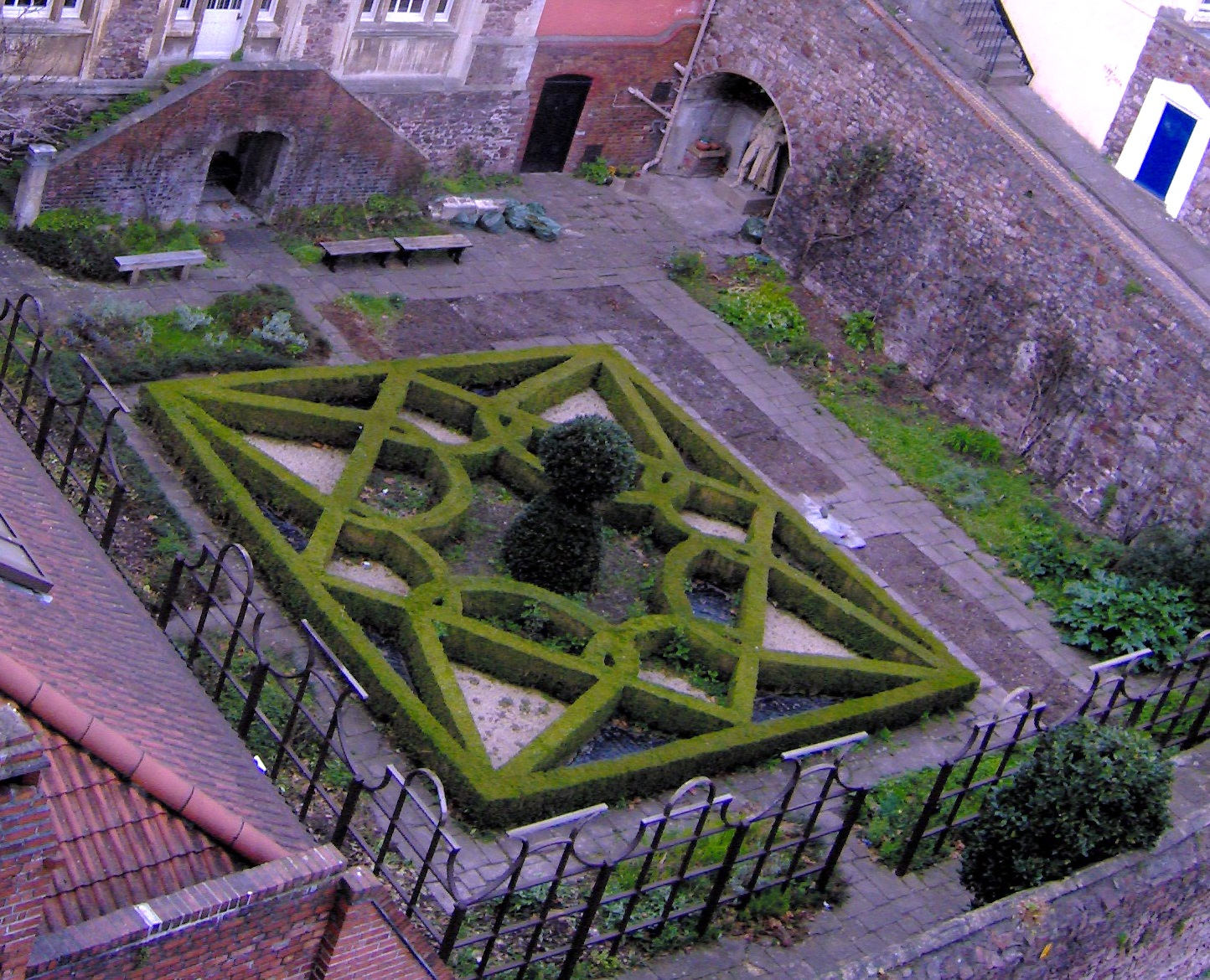
The Knot Garden at the Red Lodge Museum, Bristol.

Some early knot gardens have been covered over by lawn or other landscaping, but the original traces are still visible as undulations in the present day landscape. An example of this phenomenon is the early 17th-century garden of Muchalls Castle in Scotland.

Modern representations and restorations of knot gardens have become established in many temperate formal gardens throughout the world, including:

- Alexandra Hicks Herb Knot Garden, University of Michigan, US
- Antony House, Cornwall, England
- Anzac Square, Dunedin, New Zealand
- Astley Castle, Warwickshire, England
- Barnsley House, Gloucestershire, England
- Bourton House Garden, Gloucestershire, England
- Brooklyn Botanic Garden, New York City, US
- Cleveland Botanical Garden, US
- Compton Castle, Devon, England
- Garden Museum, London
- Hatfield House, Hertfordshire, England
- Helmingham Hall, Suffolk, England
- Knowle, Solihull, England
- Little Moreton Hall, Cheshire, England
- Red Lodge Museum, Bristol, England
- St Fagans, South Wales
- Stoneleigh Abbey, Warwickshire, England
- Sudeley Castle, Cotswolds, England
- Dunbar’s Close garden, Edinburgh
- Pitmedden Garden, Aberdeenshire

A knot garden is featured in Shakespeare's play Love's Labour's Lost.

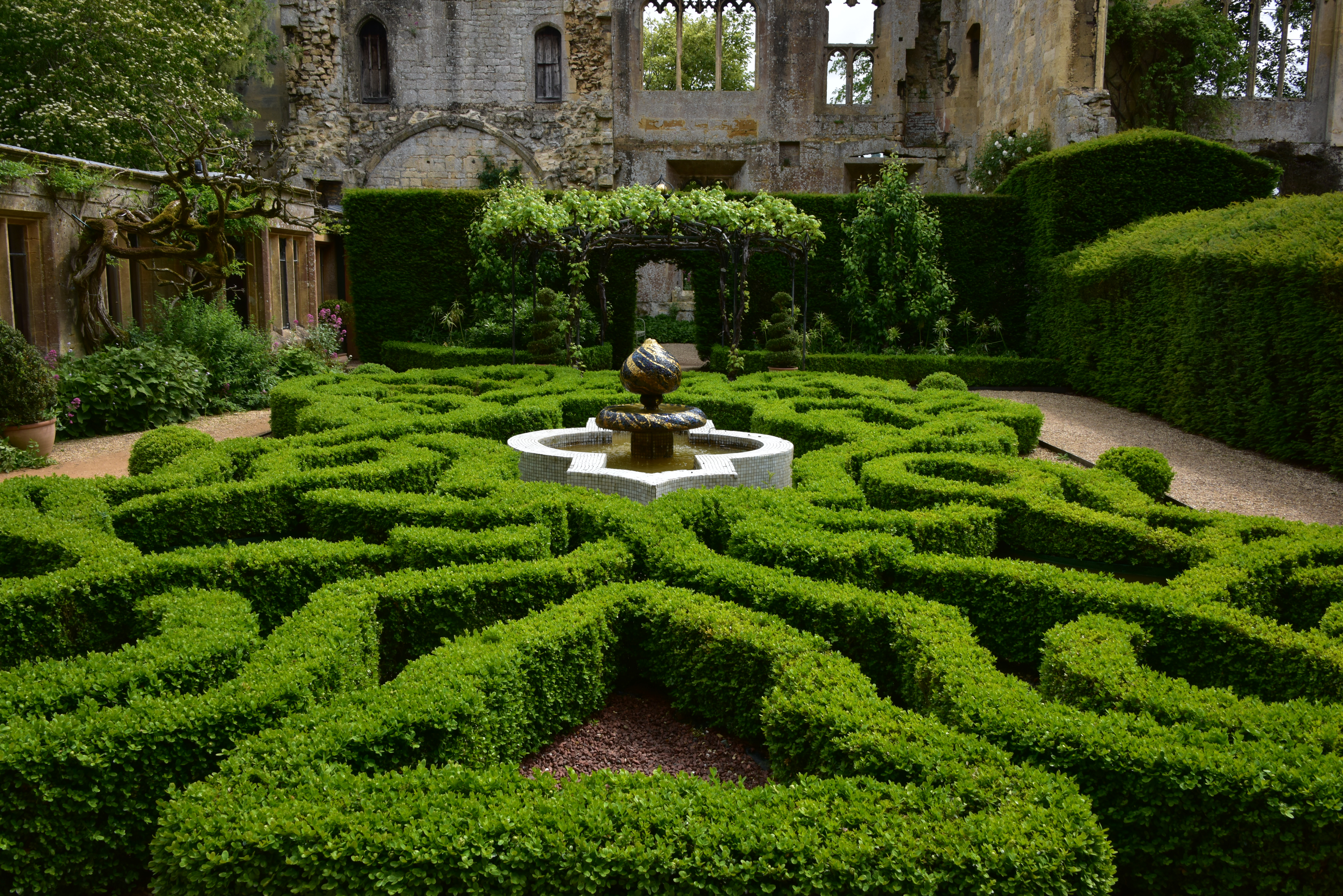
Knot Garden at Sudeley Castle, Gloucestershire, England

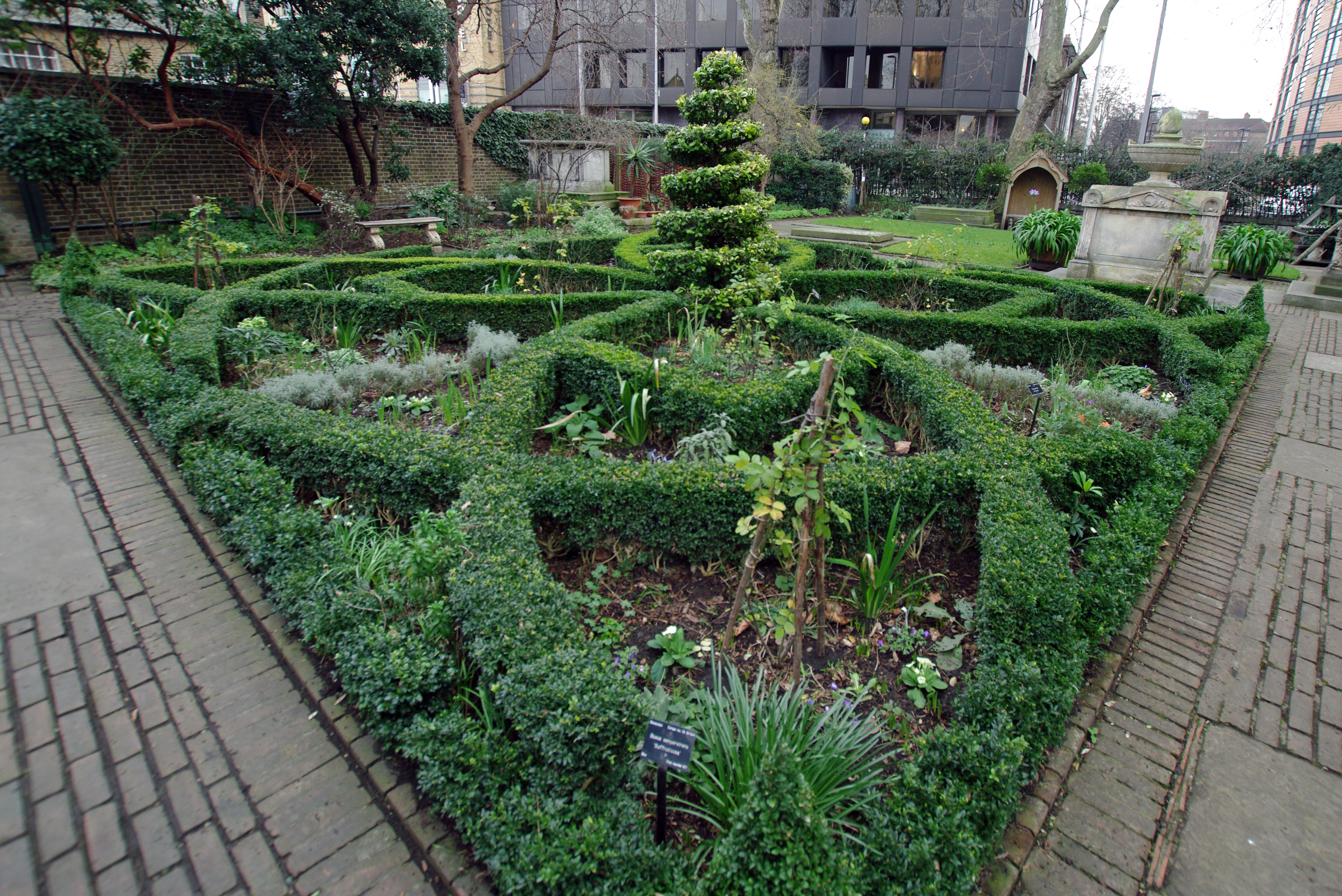
Garden Museum, London, England

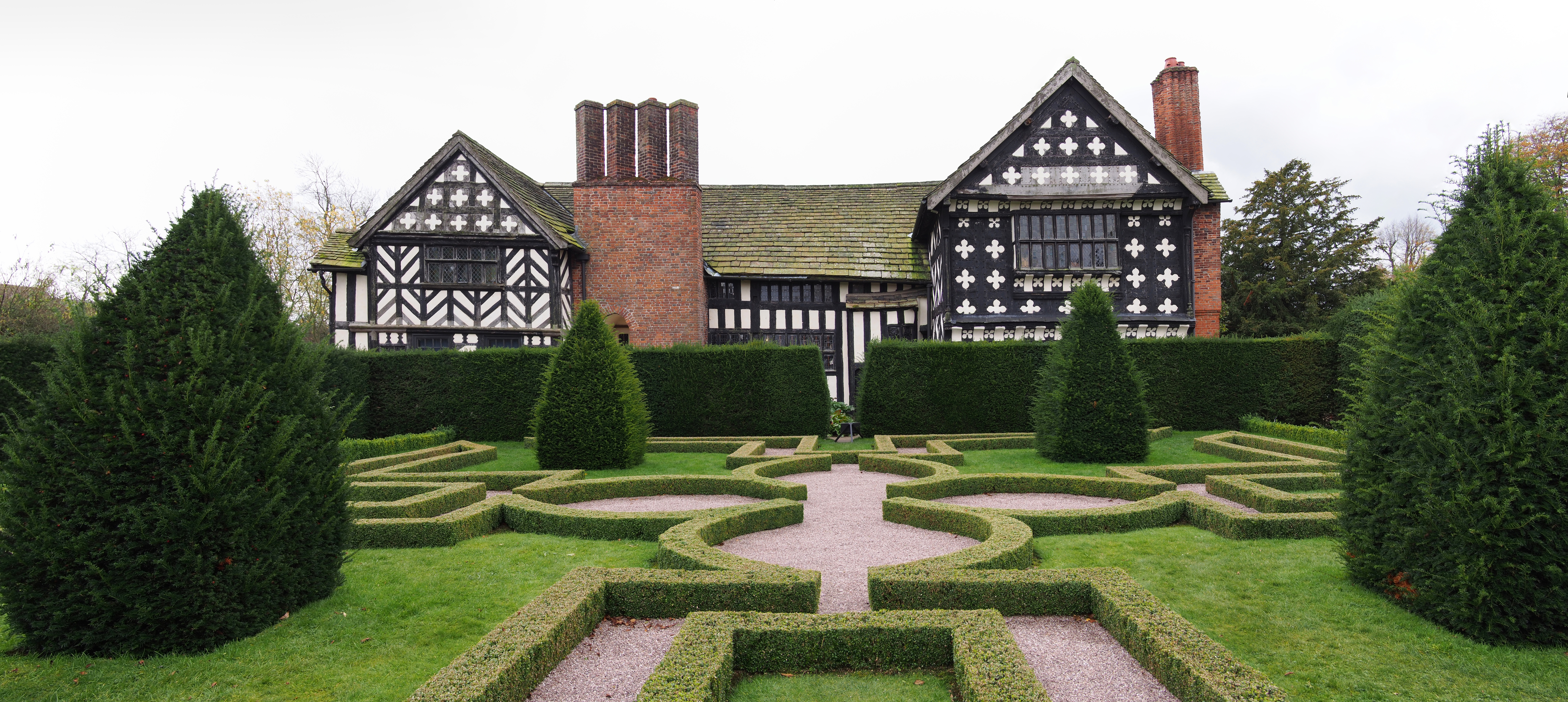
Little Moreton Hall Knot Garden, Cheshire, England

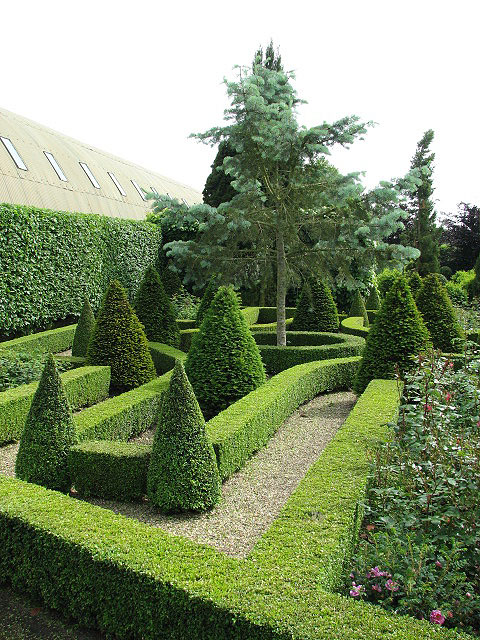
Knot Garden at Moseley Old Hall, Wolverhampton, England

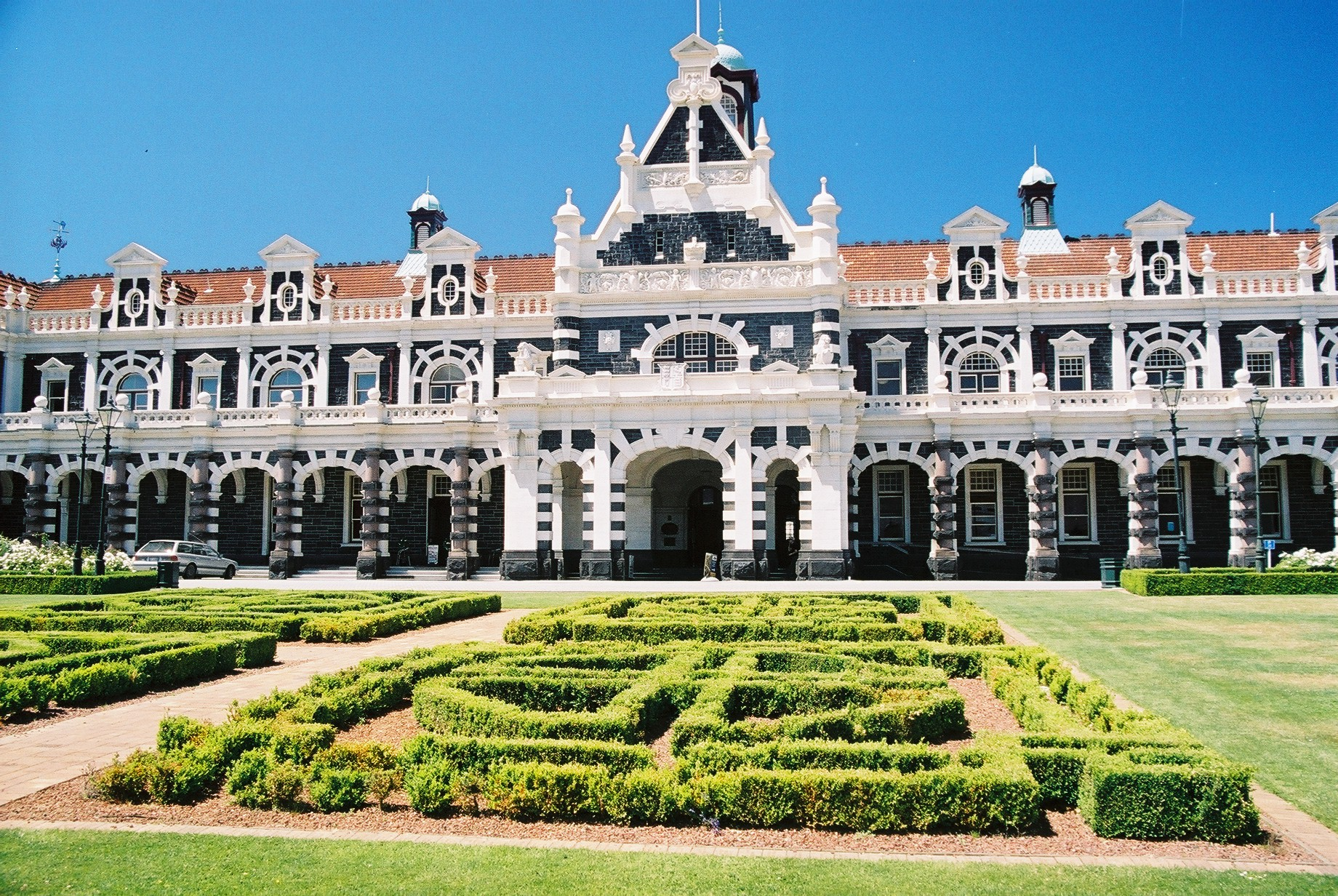
Anzac Square, Dunedin, New Zealand

== See also ==
- List of garden types
- Gardens of the French Renaissance
- Garden à la française
