= Kafka's Dick =

Play written by Alan Bennett

Kafka's Dick is a 1986 play by Alan Bennett which premiered in 1986 at the Royal Court Theatre London. It is a play about the nature of fame, and how reputation is gained.

== Plot ==
Set in the 1980s in a Yorkshire suburban dwelling, Kafka aficionado Sydney and his wife Linda are visited by Franz Kafka and his friend Max Brod who are both long dead. (Kafka had left instructions for all his works to be burned, which Brod chose to ignore.)

As the play progresses, it becomes clear that Kafka's wish was for anonymity, and that he had serious issues with his father, who turns up. The father knows a very personal secret about his son, which Kafka is terrified will be disclosed.

== Original cast ==
- Kafka - Roger Lloyd-Pack
- Brod - Andrew Sachs
- Linda - Alison Steadman
- Father - Charles Lamb
- Sydney - Geoffrey Palmer
- Hermann K - Jim Broadbent
- Julie - Vivian Pickles

The director was Richard Eyre, designer William Dudley, with music by George Fenton.
