= The White Sheep of the Family (play) =

1951 play

- Original language: English
- Written by: Ian Hay; Lawrence du Garde Peach
- Genre: Comedy

Premiere
- Date: 3 September 1951
- Place: Royal Court Theatre, Liverpool

The White Sheep of the Family is a 1951 British comedy play by Lawrence du Garde Peach and Ian Hay. A criminal family are distressed when their son wants to go straight.

It premiered at the Royal Court Theatre in Liverpool before transferring to London's West End. It ran for 273 performances at the Piccadilly Theatre between 11 October 1951 and 7 June 1952. The cast included Jack Hulbert, Joyce Carey, Cyril Chamberlain, Derek Blomfield and Rona Anderson, making her West End debut.

== Bibliography ==
- Wearing, J.P. The London Stage 1950-1959: A Calendar of Productions, Performers, and Personnel. Rowman & Littlefield, 2014.
