= Bristol Beacon =

Concert hall in Bristol, England

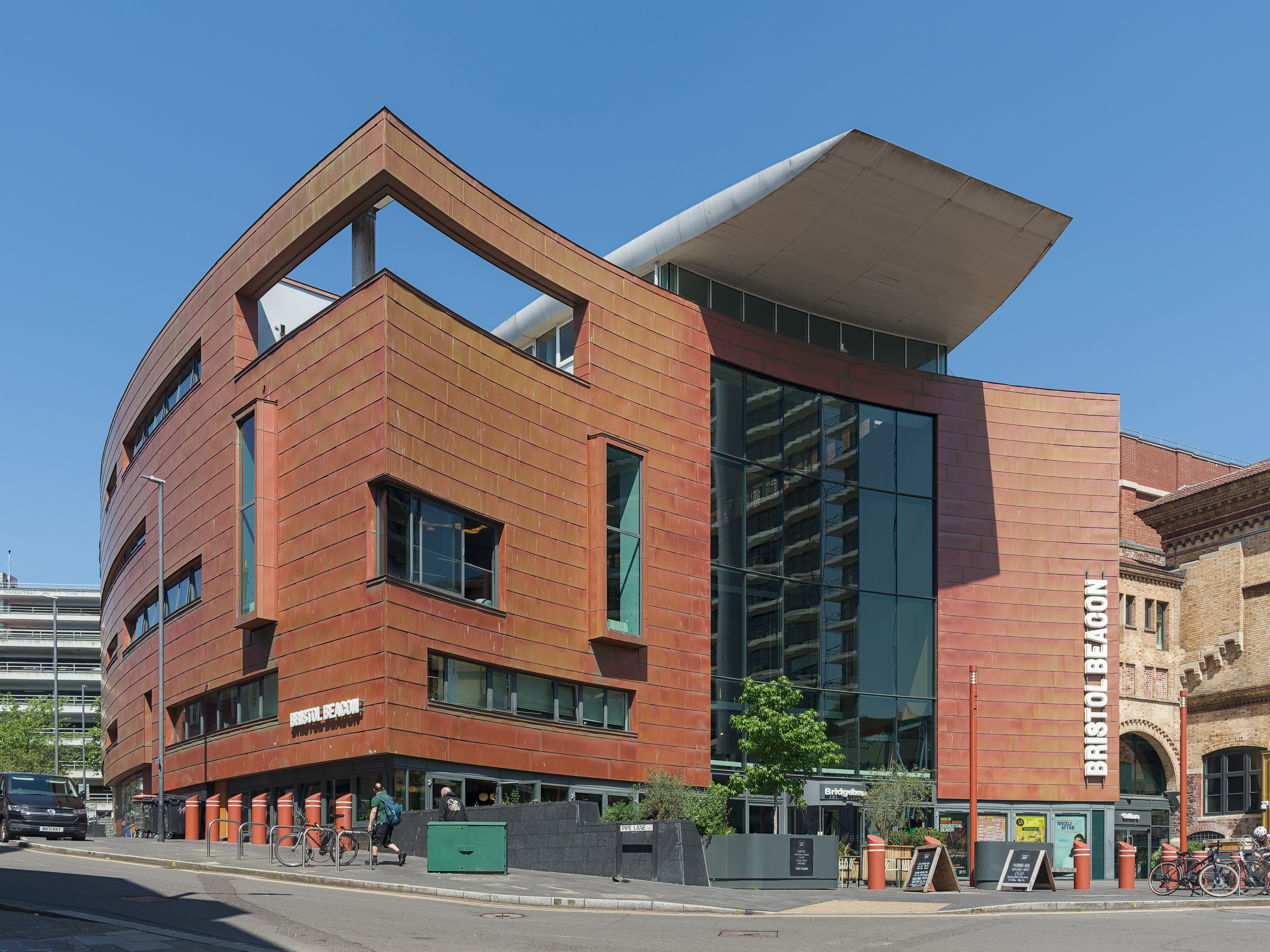
- The 2009 foyer block
- Interactive map of Bristol Beacon
- Former names: Colston Hall (1867–2020)
- Coordinates: 51.4546°N 2.5981°W
- Owner: Bristol City Council
- Operator: Bristol Music Trust
- Capacity: 1,800 (2,100 standing) (main auditorium)

Construction
- Groundbreaking: May 1863
- Opened: 20 September 1867
- Renovated: 1993; 2009; 2018–2023
- Reopened: 27 November 1900; December 1936; 7 July 1951; 30 November 2023
- Rebuilt: 1898–1900; 1935–36; 1945–51
- Architects: Foster & Wood

Website
- bristolbeacon.org

Bristol Beacon, previously Colston Hall, is a concert hall and Grade II listed building on Colston Street, Bristol, England. It is owned by Bristol City Council. Since 2011, it has been managed by Bristol Music Trust.

The hall opened as a concert venue in 1867, and became a popular place for classical music and theatre. In the mid-20th century, wrestling matches were in strong demand, while in the late 1960s it developed into one of the most important rock music venues in Britain. The hall has been redeveloped several times, and was gutted by fires in 1898 and 1945, though the original Bristol Byzantine foyer has survived. A major refurbishment, adding an extra wing, opened in 2009.

The hall closed in 2018 for repair and refurbishment work, and reopened on 30 November 2023. Formerly named after the slave trader, merchant and philanthropist Edward Colston, who founded Colston's School on the site in the early 18th century, it was renamed after a number of years of campaigning because of Colston's ties to the Atlantic slave trade. The renaming was brought forward in September 2020 following anti-racism protests in Bristol that summer.

== History ==
=== Predecessors on the site ===
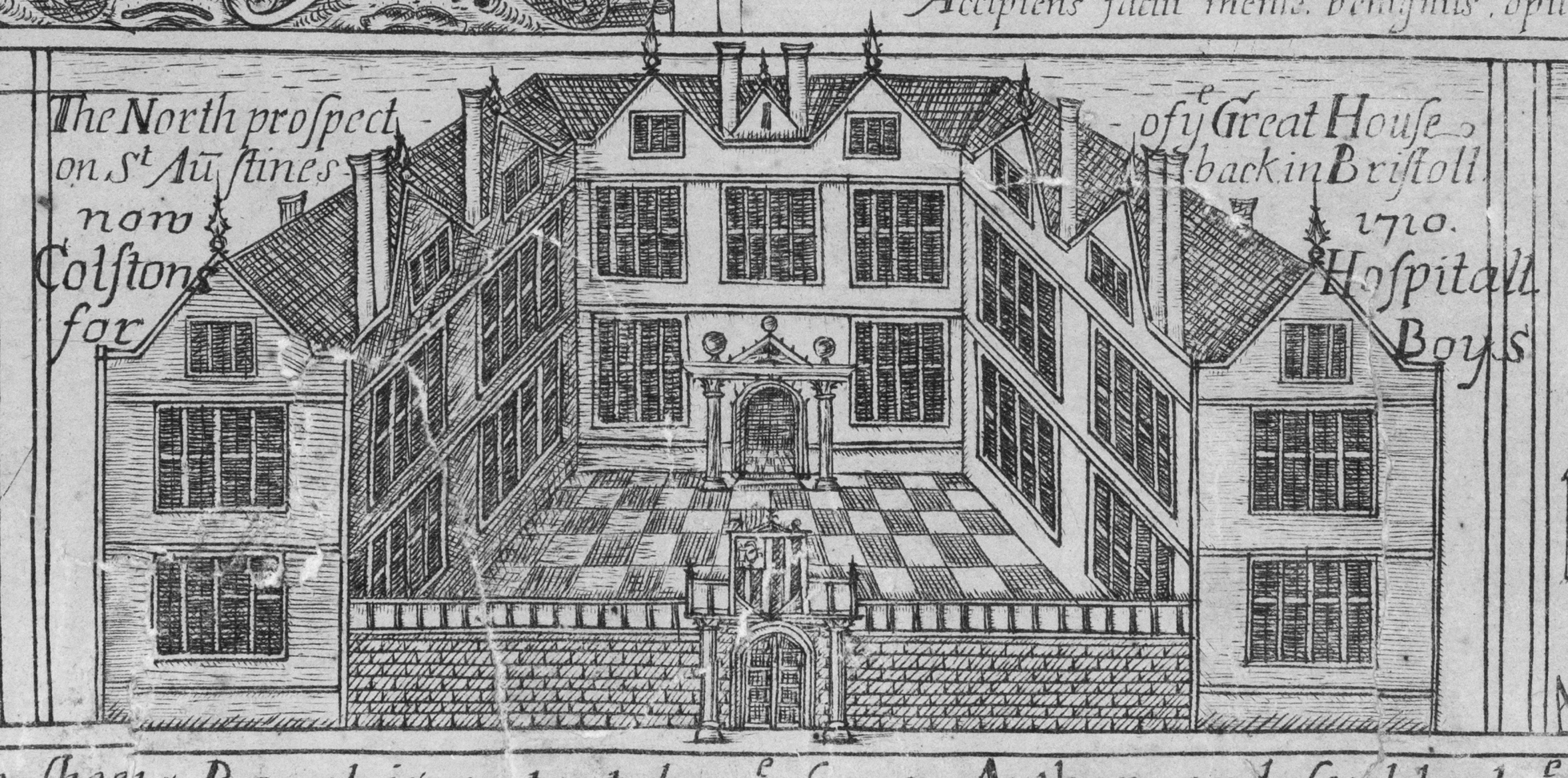
The Great House (then Colston's Hospital for boys) on St Augustine's back, Bristol, 1720s

There has been a building on the site of the hall since the Middle Ages. During the 13th century, a Carmelite friary called Whitefriars stood on the site. In the Tudor period, it was replaced by a mansion called The Great House, built in 1568 by Sir John Young, a member of a merchant family and courtier to Henry VIII. Queen Elizabeth I stayed there as a guest of the Youngs when visiting Bristol in 1574.

In the late 17th century, a sugar house was established here by the merchant venturer Edward Colston to refine sugar that was brought in from the Caribbean to Bristol Harbour. The sugar refinery included thirteen cottages for workers in its grounds which extended towards the current site of the Red Lodge Museum.

In 1708, Colston established the Colston Boys' School in this building in order to educate the poor. It was managed by the Society of Merchant Venturers. Colston adhered to a strict moral and religious code which was enforced in the school. After his death in 1721, the school continued at the Great Hall until 1857, when it moved to Stapleton.

=== Construction ===
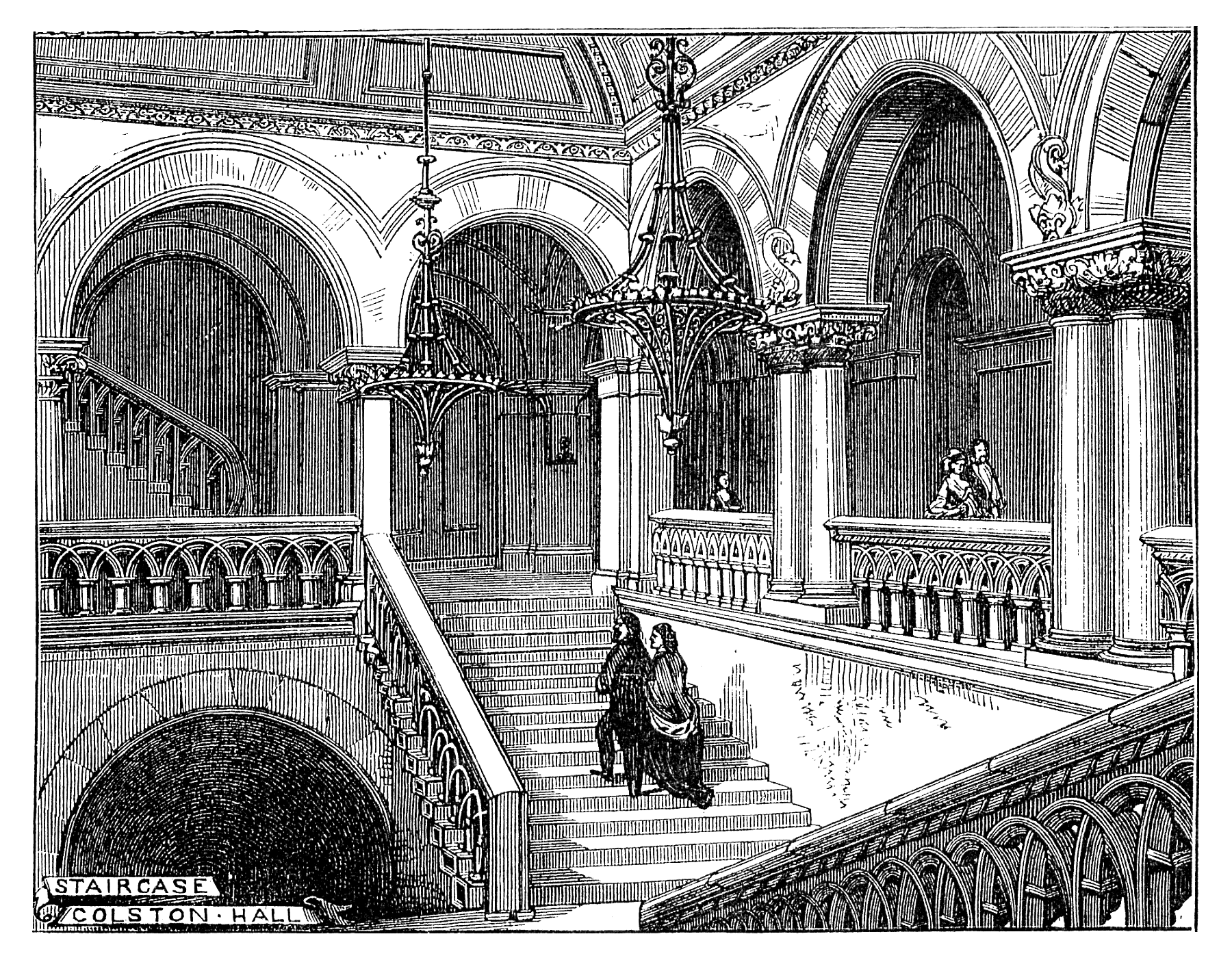
Interior of Colston Hall in 1873, before the fire

The site was acquired by the Colston Hall Company in 1861, who raised £12,000 in £10 shares. The company had grown out of an effort by the Bristol Temperance Progressionist Society to build a hall near St. James' Priory and was supported by wealthy Liberals, who saw the Victoria Rooms in Clifton as too closely tied to the Tory interest. They demolished the old school building in order to build a concert hall, which opened on 20 September 1867. The architects were local firm Foster & Wood, working in the Bristol Byzantine style. The basement was used as a bonded warehouse handling cargoes from the docks. The original hall included a coffered barrel-vaulted ceiling, and was modelled after St George's Hall, Liverpool.

The foyer building with the grand staircase and the smaller hall (the Lesser Colston Hall, now the Lantern) were opened in 1873. A meeting calling for women's suffrage was held at the hall in November 1880.

=== First rebuild, 1901 ===
On 1 September 1898, a fire broke out in the neighbouring Clark's clothing factory, which quickly spread to the hall while it was in use for the Trades Union Congress. The auditorium suffered extensive damage, with only the walls remaining, and the pipe organ was completely destroyed. The foyer was the only part of the building to survive in its original condition.

The hall was rebuilt, and re-opened in 1901. It was in use throughout the First World War; in 1915, David Lloyd George addressed a meeting in the hall to discuss the production of munitions, while in 1919 a Roll of Honour ceremony took place there for soldiers who had been decorated for their service during the war. The Bristol Corporation, which later became Bristol City Council, bought the building for £65,000 in 1919. The Lesser Colston Hall became the Little Theatre in 1923, initially under the control of the Rotary Club, then Little Theatre Ltd in 1929 and the Rapier Players from 1935.

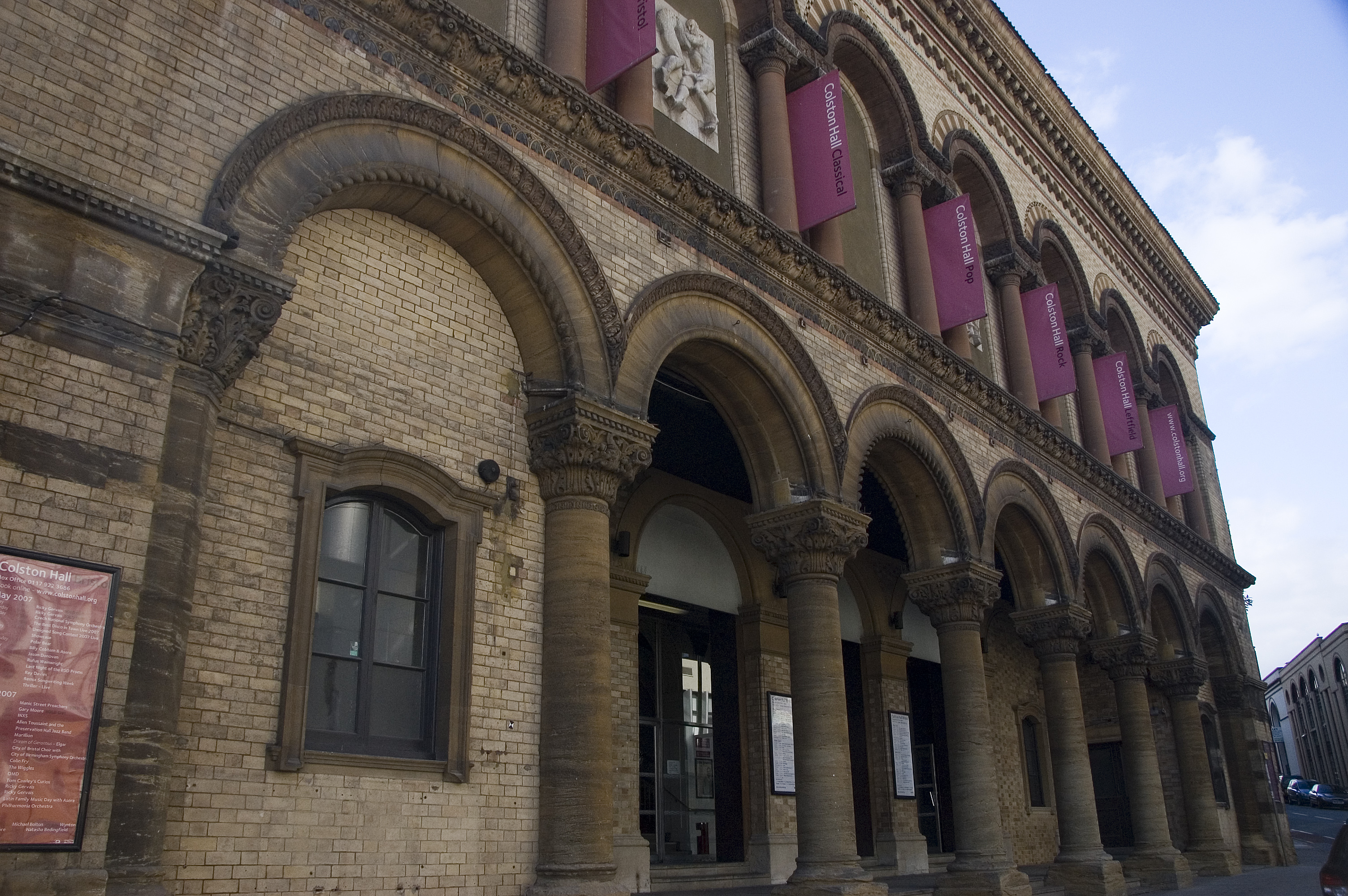
The Bristol Byzantine-style façade at the front of Colston Hall

The second hall was closed for remodelling in 1935, as it was difficult for all of the audience to see the orchestra performing. It re-opened the following December.

=== Second rebuild, 1951 ===
Though much of Bristol was bombed during the Battle of Britain, the Colston Hall survived most of the Second World War. On 5 February 1945, a discarded cigarette started a large fire that burned down the hall for a second time. The organ was destroyed, and the main auditorium was reduced to pieces of charred wood and hot metal.

The hall was refurbished and initially used in 1951 to commemorate the Festival of Britain. It was designed by J. Nelson Meredith and constructed by William Cowlin. It included improvements in the building's acoustics and a modern heating and ventilation system. The organ was rebuilt by Harrison & Harrison and housed in a grille behind the stage, out of view of most of the audience. It has 5,372 pipes, ranging from 1 inch (whistle) to 32 feet (sub-bass). Acts from the United States began to appear at the hall, having been restricted by the Musicians' Union for the previous 20 years. In 1966, the building was Grade II listed by English Heritage. The Rapier Players had given notice to terminate their lease of the Little Theatre in 1961, and Bristol Old Vic took it over from 1963 until 1980. Thereafter, the Little Theatre was turned into a bar, which the hall, due to its temperance origins, had always lacked.

The first computerised booking system was installed in February 1983. In 1990, the hall briefly closed as part of a £500,000 modernisation programme to rewire the building and improve the technical facilities, as well as redecorate the backstage area. In 1999, removable seats were installed in the front of the stalls, to cater for rock concerts where fans at the front wanted to move around freely, as well as increasing capacity. The official capacity of the hall was then 2,075.

=== 21st century ===
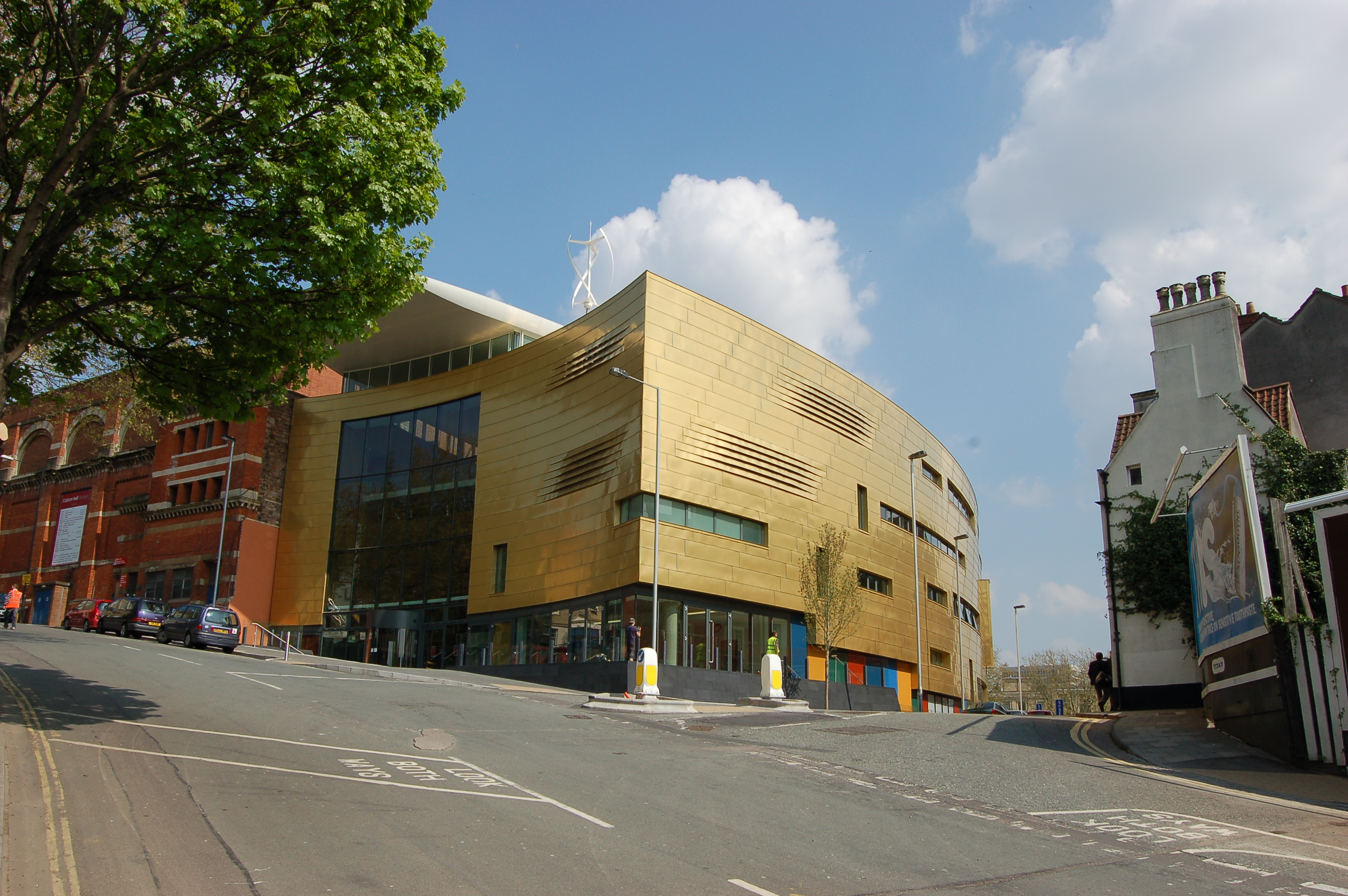
The new foyer alongside Colston Hall, which opened in 2009

From 2007 to 2009, the Colston Hall underwent extensive refurbishment with the construction of a new foyer alongside the present building by Willmott Dixon, topped by a wind turbine. With the provision of several new bars in the new foyer building, the old bar area (formerly the Lesser Colston Hall and Little Theatre) was returned to performance use as The Lantern, accommodating a standing audience of 350. The redeveloped complex also provided additional performance spaces, meeting rooms, and restaurants.

In 2011, management of Colston Hall transferred from Bristol City Council to Bristol Music Trust. In 2014, the trust announced a fundraising campaign to raise £45 million to refurbish and modernise the main hall. Proposed works included converting the cellars into studios, and other internal modernisations. By 2016, £25 million had been raised by Bristol City Council, the national government, and Arts Council England. Work began in 2019, carried out by Willmott Dixon, with completion set for 2023.

The hall closed in 2018 for safety and refurbishment work, due to be completed in 2020 at a cost of £48 million. Because of significant unforeseen structural and heritage issues the works were extended. By 2022, costs had more than doubled to £107 million, making it a major area of investment, second only to the council's housing stock. The council's auditors criticised it for the overrun, saying the council had underestimated the complexity and difficulty of the work and failed to have effective management arrangements.

In July 2022, the hall was expected to reopen in late 2023. In January 2023, costs again increased by £25 million, bringing the total to £132 million, of which Bristol Council is responsible for £84 million. Renamed to the Bristol Beacon, it reopened on 30 November 2023, with a capacity of 1,800 (2,100 standing) in the main hall and two additional auditoria in the cellars and a former recital room. The venue plans to become the first net zero concert hall in the UK by 2030, and the refurbishment includes 348 solar panels providing 12% of the venue's electricity. Architects Levitt Bernstein received a 2026 RIBA National Award.

In January 2026, the restored Britton organ, built in 1956 by Harrison & Harrison, came back into use. The organ is Grade II listed.

== Renaming ==
In 2014, campaigners called for the hall's name to be changed because of Edward Colston’s involvement in the slave trade, much of his wealth having come from that trade, and his investments in the Royal African Company. The Bristol group Massive Attack vowed not to play at the venue while it retained its name. The proposal led to a debate in the pages of the local press.

In April 2017, the charity that runs the hall stated that it was going to change the name of the venue after completion of refurbishment works. On 15 June 2020 the lettering "Colston Hall" was removed from the exterior, and the charity announced that a new name would be disclosed later in that year. The new name "Bristol Beacon" was announced on 23 September 2020; Louise Mitchell, chief executive of the Bristol Music Trust, said that the renaming would be "a symbol of hope and community".

== Artists and performers ==
=== Classical ===
Details of early performances at the hall are limited due to the subsequent fires, but the archive of the Royal College of Music holds programmes from 1896 onwards which reference a triennial musical festival that was founded in 1873, as well as performances by the (long defunct) Bristol Symphony Orchestra. The British Library holds details of the 1912 festival at the hall which, among other concerts, included a performance of Wagner's Ring Cycle over four days. Sergei Rachmaninoff performed at the hall in the 1920s, and a concert programme from 1969 lists forthcoming weekly classical concerts with soloists such as Arthur Rubinstein and Igor Oistrakh as well as the Bournemouth Symphony Orchestra, the (now defunct) Bristol Sinfonia, conducted by Sidney Sager and concerts by Bristol Choral Society, which has staged at least three concerts annually at the hall since its formation in 1889.

There is an annual International Classical Concert Season featuring regular appearances by the Bournemouth Symphony Orchestra and visiting UK and international orchestras such as the London Symphony Orchestra, Philharmonia Orchestra, the Moscow Philharmonic Orchestra, Warsaw Philharmonic Orchestra and Berliner Symphoniker in the 2011–12 season, as well as solo artists such as Murray Perahia.

The hall can stage theatrical productions. From 22–30 December 2011 it hosted 15 performances of the Bristol Old Vic production of Coram Boy while the Old Vic was closed for refurbishment.

=== Rock ===
The hall has been a popular venue for many rock and pop music acts since the 1960s. The Beatles first performed at Colston Hall on 15 March 1963 as part of a package tour with Chris Montez and Tommy Roe. The group returned there to play the last gig of a British tour on 10 November 1964, where four fans managed to sneak backstage and tip flour over their heads. The Rolling Stones performed at Colston Hall with Ike & Tina Turner and The Yardbirds on 7 October 1966.

From the late 1960s onwards, Colston Hall became one of the major rock music venues in the country. Jimi Hendrix played twice at the hall in 1967.David Bowie, Elton John, Queen, Thin Lizzy, Roxy Music, Iron Maiden, Bob Marley and Lou Reed all performed there. Bob Dylan performed there on 10 May 1966, the last month of his controversial world tour. The Who first played Colston Hall on 10 November 1968, part-way through recording Tommy, with support from Free, and returned on 7 March 1970. Led Zeppelin played at Colston Hall in June 1969, part-way through recording Led Zeppelin II. Pink Floyd gave one of the first live performances of The Dark Side of the Moon at Colston Hall on 5 February 1972, over a year before the album was released.

Queen headlined Colston Hall three times, firstly on Tuesday 12 November 1974 as part of the Sheer Heart Attack Tour, returning on 17 and 18 November 1975 as part of the A Night At The Opera Tour. Subsequent tours would see them play at the Bristol Hippodrome.

=== Comedy ===
In addition to rock and pop artists, the hall regularly hosts comedians (including multiple-date sell-out runs by Billy Connolly and Bristol-born Stephen Merchant). An annual silent comedy festival takes place there.

=== Wrestling ===
Colston Hall was popular for wrestling matches from 1951. By the end of the decade, demand for matches was so strong that seats were block booked from one day to the next. Harold Sakata made several wrestling appearances there before moving into acting in the 1960s. The last match was held in 2004.

== Bibliography ==
- Bowen, George S. (1898). Rejoice Greatly. Bristol: White Tree Books. ISBN 0-948265-87-6.
- Burrough, T.H.B (1970). Bristol (City Buildings Series). Studio Vista. ISBN 978-0289798041.
- Coules, Victoria (2006). Lost Bristol. Birlinn Limited. ISBN 9781841585338.
- Foyle, Andrew (2004). Bristol (Pevsner Architectural Guides: City Guides). Yale University Press. ISBN 978-0300104424.
- Lewis, Dave (1990). Led Zeppelin: A Celebration. Music Sales Group. ISBN 978-0-857-12819-5.
- Neill, Andrew; Kent, Matthew (2009). Anyway Anyhow Anywhere: The Complete Chronicle of The Who 1958–1978. Sterling Publishing. ISBN 978-0-7535-1217-3.
- Povey, Glenn (2007). Echoes: The Complete History of Pink Floyd. Mind Head Publishing. p. 1921. ISBN 978-0-955-46240-5.
- Webb, Peter (2010). Exploring the Networked Worlds of Popular Music: Milieux Cultures. Routledge. ISBN 978-1-135-910792.
