= Red Lodge Museum, Bristol =

Historic house museum in Bristol

Red Lodge Museum
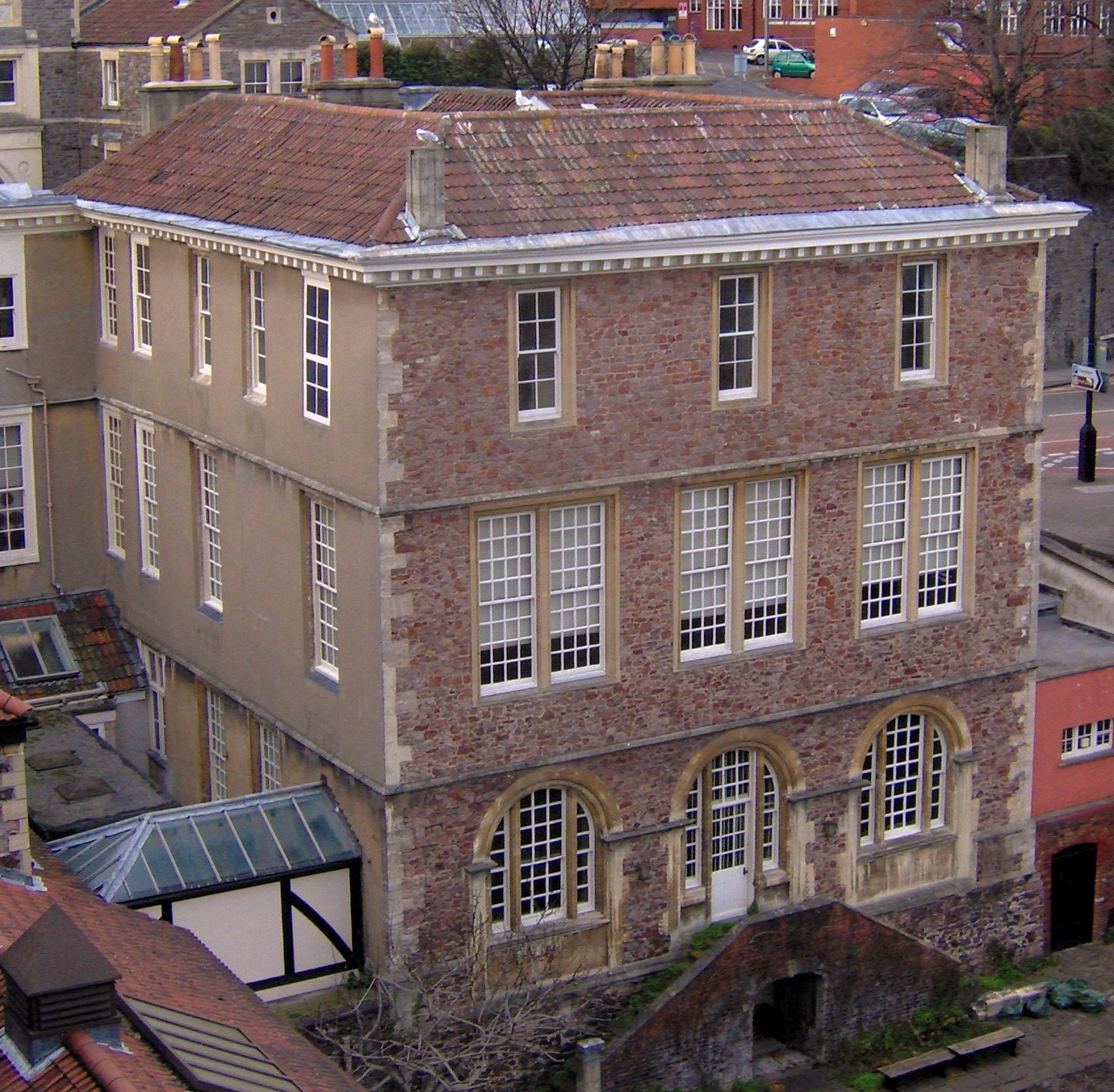
- Red Lodge

- Location within Bristol

General information
- Location: Park Row, Bristol BS1 5LJ, England
- Coordinates: 51.455556°N 2.599583°W
- Grid ref: ST582731
- Completed: 1580
- Client: John Yonge

Website
- www.bristolmuseums.org.uk/red-lodge-museum/

The Red Lodge Museum is a historic house museum in Bristol, England. The original building was Tudor/Elizabethan, and construction began in 1579–1580, possibly to the design of Sebastiano Serlio. The main additional building phases are from the 1730s and the early 19th century.

The Red Lodge is a free museum but welcomes donations, and is managed as a branch of Bristol City Council.

The artworks on display at the Red Lodge are listed on the Art UK website.

== Brief history ==
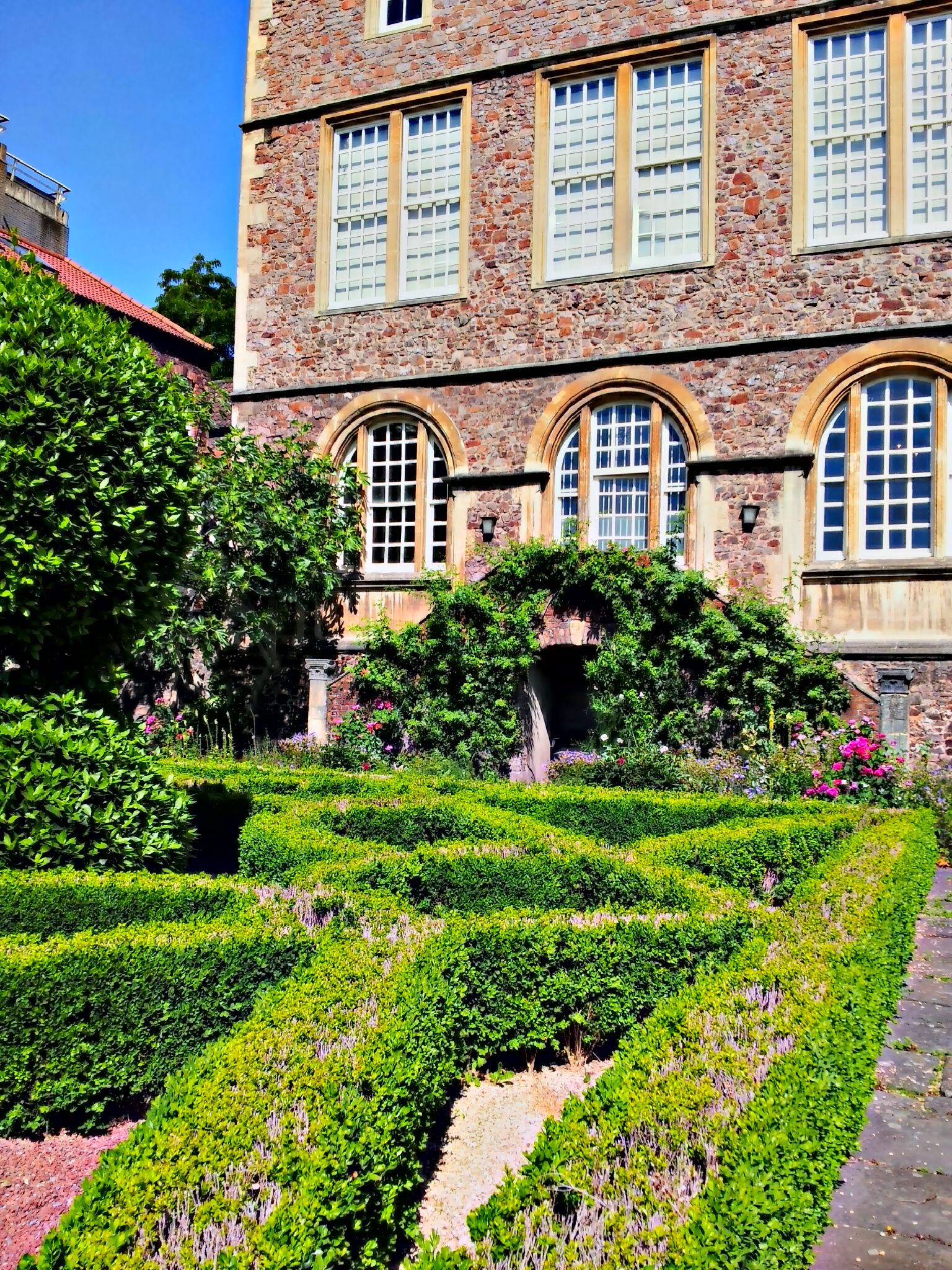
The Red Lodge Museum has an Elizabethan Knot Garden

=== John Young and the Great House ===
The Red Lodge was originally built at the top of the gardens of "ye Great House of St. Augustine's Back". The Great House was built in 1568 on the site of an old Carmelite Priory, later still the site of Bristol Beacon (formerly named Colston Hall), by Sir John Young/Yonge, the descendant of a merchant family and courtier to Henry VIII and Elizabeth I.

The Red Lodge would have originally been used as an additional guest house and entertainment pavilion, so that the Young family could promenade their guests through their eight ornamental gardens and orchards to wine and dine them.

Sir John Young died in 1589, and the Red Lodge was completed in 1590 by his widow Dame Joan. From an ancient Somerset and Devon family, Dame Joan was a sister and co-heiress of Nicholas Wadham, co-founder with his wife Dorothy Wadham of Wadham College, Oxford. She was married firstly to Sir Giles Strangways (1528-1562) of Melbury Sampford and then to John Young, who was knighted by Queen Elizabeth I when she stayed with the Youngs at The Great House on her visit to Bristol in 1574, and the arms of Young impaling Wadham are carved above the porch entrance to the Great Oak Room at the Red Lodge. A fine monument to Joan Wadham (1533–1603) with her recumbent effigy lies at the west entrance to nearby Bristol Cathedral.

Their son, Robert Young inherited the entire estate. Robert quickly spent his inheritance and had to convey the Red Lodge to his half-brother Nicholas Strangways to avoid seizure. By 1595, the building was rented out to various tenants as a residence separate from the Great House. Robert Young eventually sold the Great House to Sir Hugh Smyth of Ashton Court.

=== John and Mary Henley's extensions ===
In the 1730s, John and Mary Henley bought the Red Lodge and started major extension work on the north side, doubling the footprint of the building, fitting large Georgian windows, and rebuilding with hipped roofs and eaves, and cornices replacing gables, giving a full-height second floor.

The Henleys refurbished the Lodge's reception room and partly refurbished the parlour, leaving some original panelling and the original decorated ceiling, but made minimal changes to the Great Oak Room, Small Oak Room and bedroom, leaving the rich Tudor decoration largely untouched.

Before the end of the extension work, John Henley died, leaving Mary Henley childless and unable to inherit. John wrote into his will that Mary had the right to live in the Red Lodge for one month in every year. This meant that the building could not be leased out long-term or sold to a new owner.

=== James Cowles Pritchard and short-term tenants ===
After the Henleys died the Red Lodge was leased to tenants practising medicine working at the Bristol Royal Infirmary, including James Cowles Pritchard who wrote Researches into the Physical History of Man, and Francis Cheyne Bowles and Richard Smith, who used the Great Oak Room as a dissection theatre. In the 19th century, the current entrance to the building from Park Row was added, as well as the rooms to the East of the original core.

=== Mary Carpenter and the girls' reform school ===
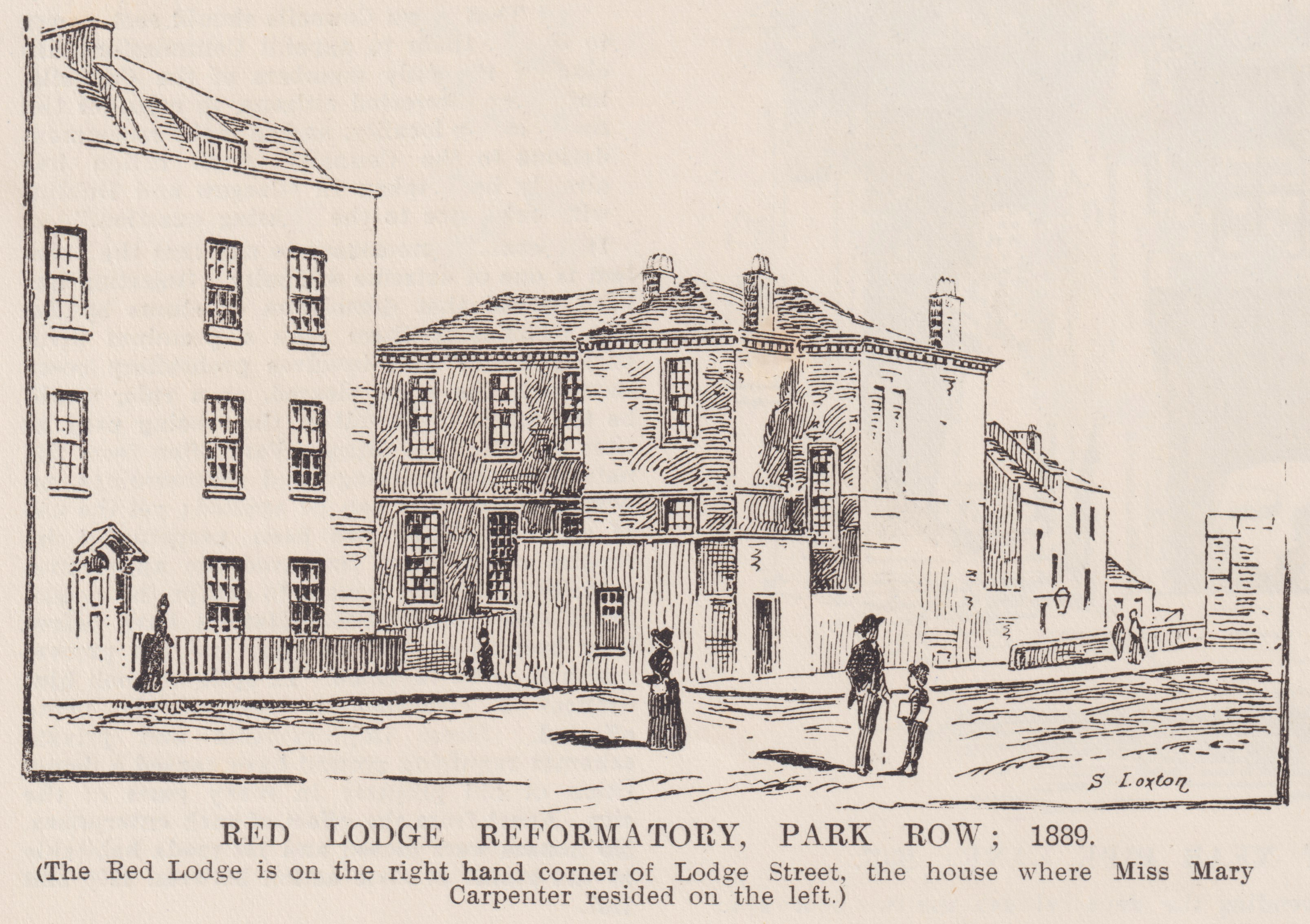
Red Lodge Reformatory, 1889

In 1854 the building was bought by Lady Byron, using Lord Byron's endowment, and given to Mary Carpenter to use as a school. Mary Carpenter was a zealous reformer and founded the first ever girls' reformatory at the Red Lodge to encapsulate her radical and progressive ideas of improvement and nurture for the nation's poor, in contrast to the harsh workhouses and prisons which were the common solution in the Victorian era.

The Red Lodge was used as a reform school until 1917, during which time Carpenter used her standing as superintendent to lobby parliament and travel the world researching the plight of 'pauper children'.

=== Red Lodge Museum and Bristol 1904 Arts ===
In 1919, James Fuller Eberle saved the Red Lodge's historic interior from being pulled apart and sold piecemeal by buying the building for the Bristol 1904 Arts society (previously known as "Bristol Savages") and the Bristol Corporation. The arts society was unable to cope with the upkeep of the whole historic building, so CFW Dening built the building in the garden in 1920 and converted the Victorian Laundry into their studio, leaving the Tudor, Georgian and Victorian Red Lodge to the corporation, which became Bristol City Council.

The Council renovated the Red Lodge once in 1920 and again in 1956 before opening it as a museum. Since then the building has been a branch of Bristol Museum & Art Gallery, along with The Georgian House Museum, Blaise Castle House Museum, Kings Weston Roman Villa and M Shed.

As of 2013 the next stages of development at the Red Lodge Museum were reinstating the fixtures of the New Oak Room, including interpretation for the recently discovered well, and re-ordering the garden paving to make it safe for visitors.

== Archives ==
Records of the Red Lodge and Mary Carpenter including journals, accounts, correspondence, reports and published material are held at Bristol Archives. Also held here are the deeds of the Red Lodge and its land dating as far back as 1565.

== Rooms ==
=== Great Oak Room ===
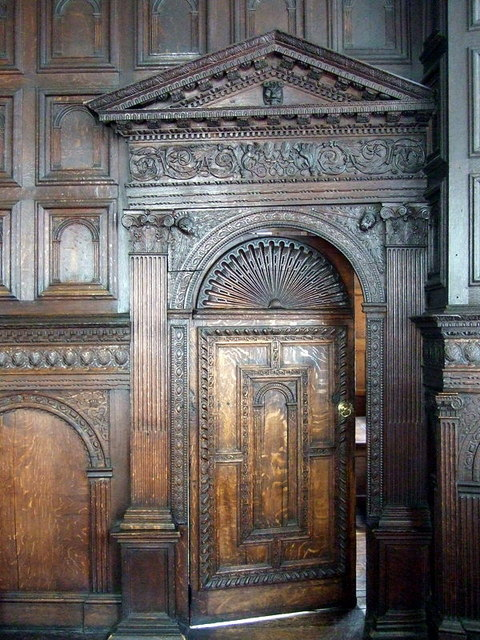
Original Tudor/Elizabethan panelling in the Great Oak Room

The Great Oak Room retains its original oak panelling, moulded plaster ceiling and 'double-decker' fireplace, making it "one of the finest rooms in the West Country". Entrance is via an oak internal porch, similar to that of Montacute House. Carved above the entrance of the porch are the arms of Young (Yonge) impaling Wadham. The only features which have changed since the room was built are the enlarged Georgian windows, giving a view onto the knot garden.

=== Small Oak Room and bedroom ===
The Small Oak Room and the bedroom are contemporary with the Great Oak Room but much less richly panelled. The bedroom has the moulded plaster ceiling upon which the knot garden's design is based. The common layout of Tudor rooms in an apartment with people travelling from most public to most intimate suggests that the Great Oak Room was the most public room whilst the Small Oak Room and bedroom were more private antechambers, possibly bedrooms and cabinets.

=== Print Room ===
The Print Room is part of the 18th-century extension of the Lodge and has been renovated by the museum to look like a typical Print Room of the period. The collection of tiles around the fireplace, examples of marquetry and parquetry in the furniture and the ‘japanned’ grandfather clock represent the fashion of the early eighteenth century.

=== Mary Carpenter Room ===
The Mary Carpenter Room contains a display of the history of the Red Lodge as a school, a painting by the "Bristol Savages" of Mary Carpenter with her first pupil, a photo of Mary Carpenter, and Mary Carpenter's Broadwood piano, bought for the house in 1845.

=== Staircase ===
The grand Georgian staircase and landing display portraits of notable people linked with the house – John and Mary Henley, Robert Yeamans, Robert Poyntz, Florence Poulett, William Herbert, the Third Earl of Pembroke, and Col. Adrian Scrope. The staircase was designed with as many windows as possible and nobly proportioned, with a grand chandelier to illuminate Mary Henley and her guests as they processed into the Reception Room.

=== Reception room and parlour ===
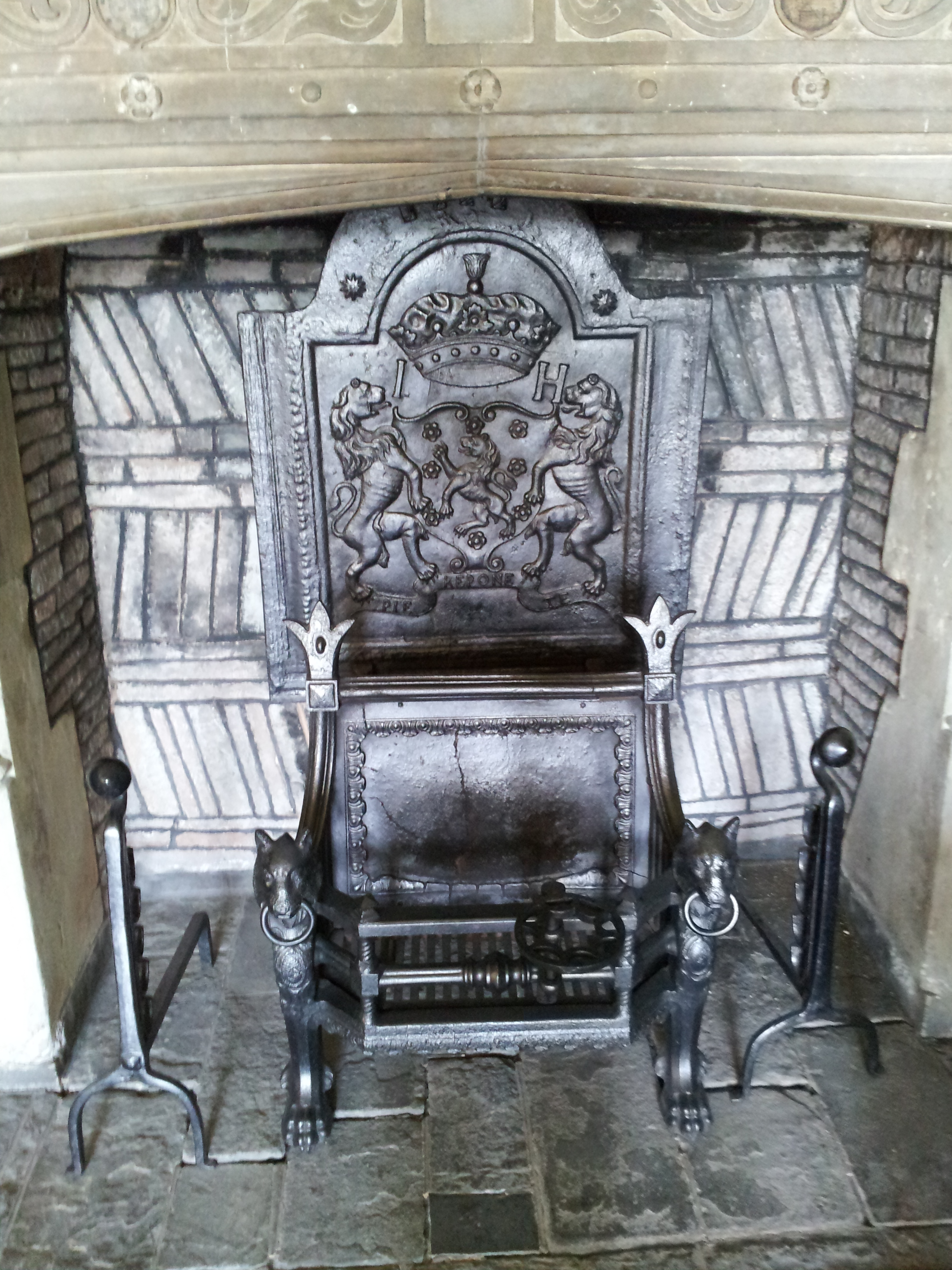
The Parlour Fireplace

Though the reception room and parlour are in the original Tudor core of the house, they underwent major renovations by the Henleys to present them as fashionable Georgian rooms. The reception room shows a beam where the original external south wall stood, but was knocked through to incorporate the loggia and extend the room as far as possible.

The parlour has a mixture of Georgian deal panelling and original Tudor oak panelling, and an original moulded plaster ceiling. It also has niches and hybrid door/windows where the 19th century extensions were made, blocking off bay windows.

=== New Oak Room ===
The New Oak Room was extensively altered in the nineteenth century, and in 1965 the museum re-used older fixtures and fittings from other sites to decorate it. The panelling is pre-18th century, bought from the refectory of St Michael-on-the-Mount, and the mantelpiece and fire surround from Ashley Down House.

=== Second floor ===
The Tudor gabled attic was extended into a full-height second floor by the Henleys.

== Notable exhibits ==
=== Portrait of Queen Elizabeth I ===
The Portrait of Queen Elizabeth I is in the Great Oak Room. It has recently been assessed as an original, painted in the late 16th century.

=== Speke chair/table ===
The chair in the Great Oak Room folds down so that the back turns into the table-top. Hybrid furniture was not uncommon in the Tudor period (for example chests used as tables and chairs). The Speke family are an aristocratic family from near Ilminster, Somerset.

=== Portrait of Florence Smyth and her black "page" ===
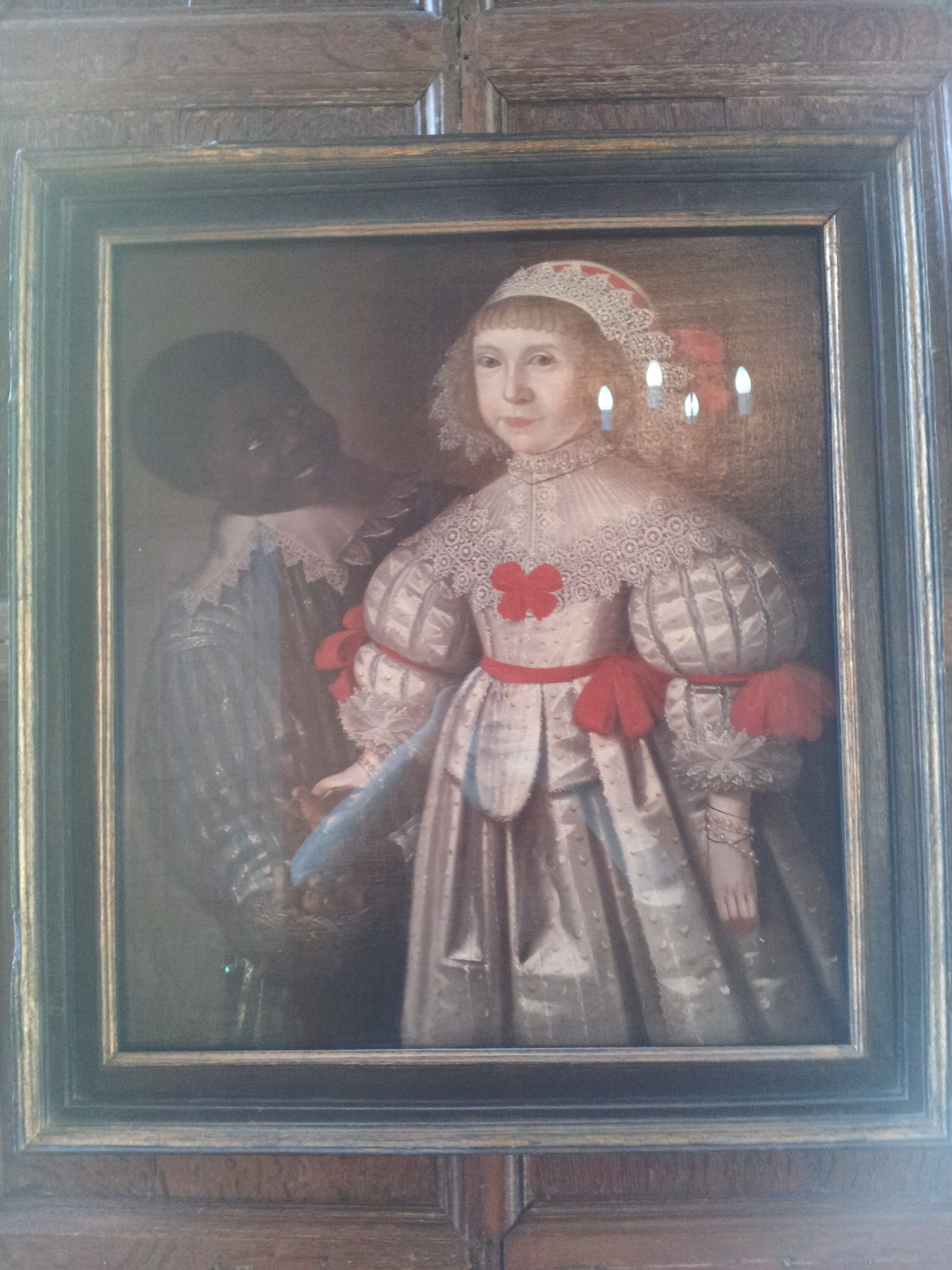
Portrait of Florence Smyth and Black 'Page' by Gilbert Jackson

In the Small Oak Room is a portrait of Florence Smyth, of the Smyth Family, and her black 'page'. There is no information on the identity of the boy in the portrait, so it cannot be said whether the boy is a slave, a servant, or a peer of Florence's. If the boy is a slave then it is probably the earliest depiction of a slave in the UK.

=== Mary Carpenter's piano ===
The piano in the Mary Carpenter Room is the original Broadwood piano bought by Mary Carpenter in 1845. The fabric panel on the front of a Broadwood is usually made from silk, so it is possible that the fabric and embroidery on this one were a project for the school girls.

=== 18th-century spinet ===
The spinet in the Print Room was made by Benjamin Slade in 1702. It has been at the Red Lodge since at least 1935 when Alec Hodson restored it. The museum and the Bristol 1904 Arts society tune it every year; it is used as part of the group's festivities.

=== Walnut bureau with hidden compartments ===
The Walnut bureau and shelves in the reception room hide multiple hidden compartments.

=== Skinner chair ===
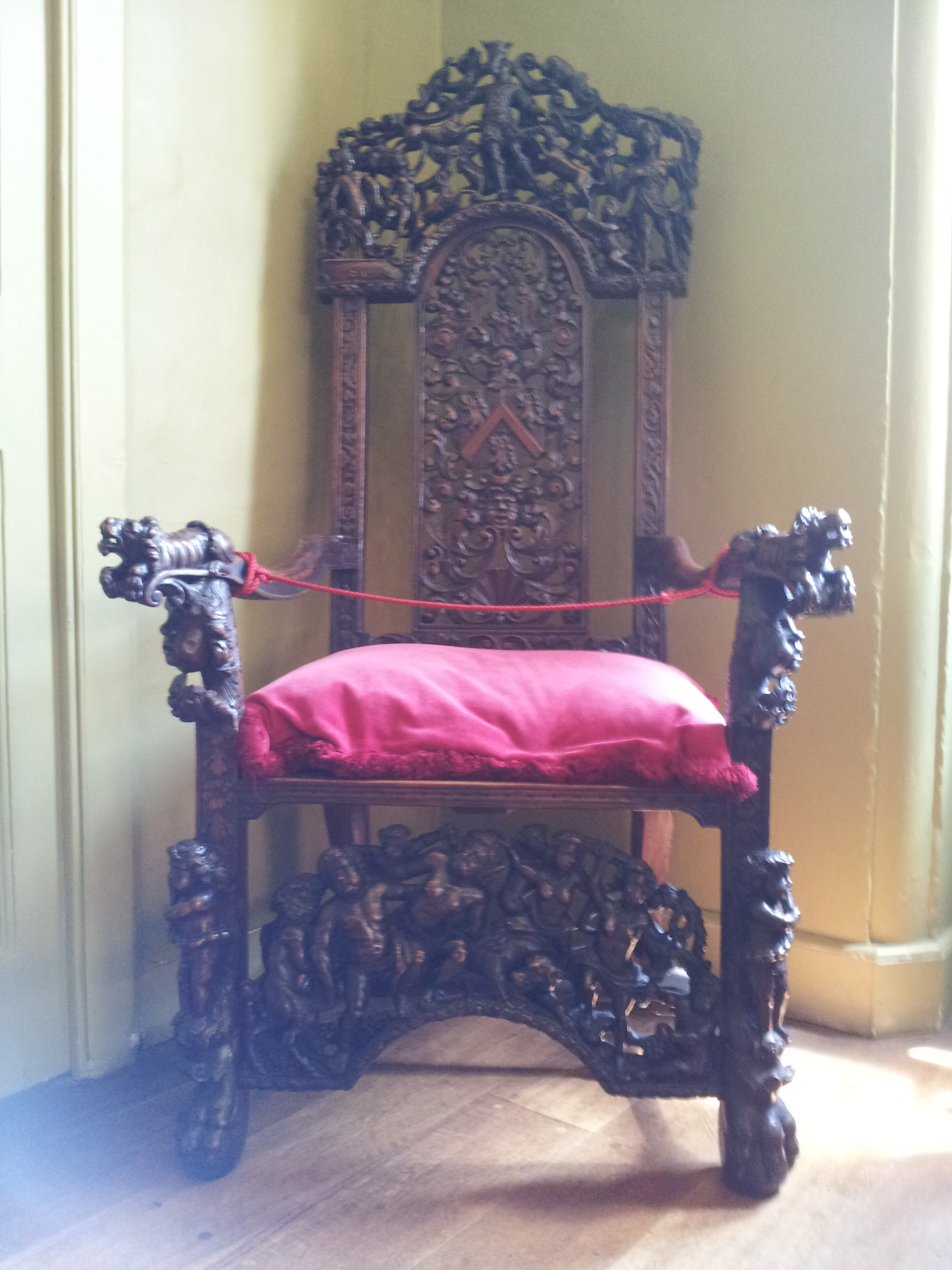
The Skinner chair with 'Actaeon' frieze

The Skinner chair in the Parlour was carved for Bishop Robert Skinner in the late 17th century. The carved relief depicts the story of Actaeon, who angered Artemis and was punished by being turned into a deer and attacked by his own hunting party.

The back of the chair also carries the arms of the Skinner family. The same arms (impaled) are also featured on his grave in Worcester Cathedral.

The chair has been used on two royal occasions – Prince Albert sat on it in 1843 when he visited Bristol to launch Brunel's ship, the SS Great Britain, and Edward VII sat on it in 1908 when the Edward VII Dock was opened.

== Knot garden ==
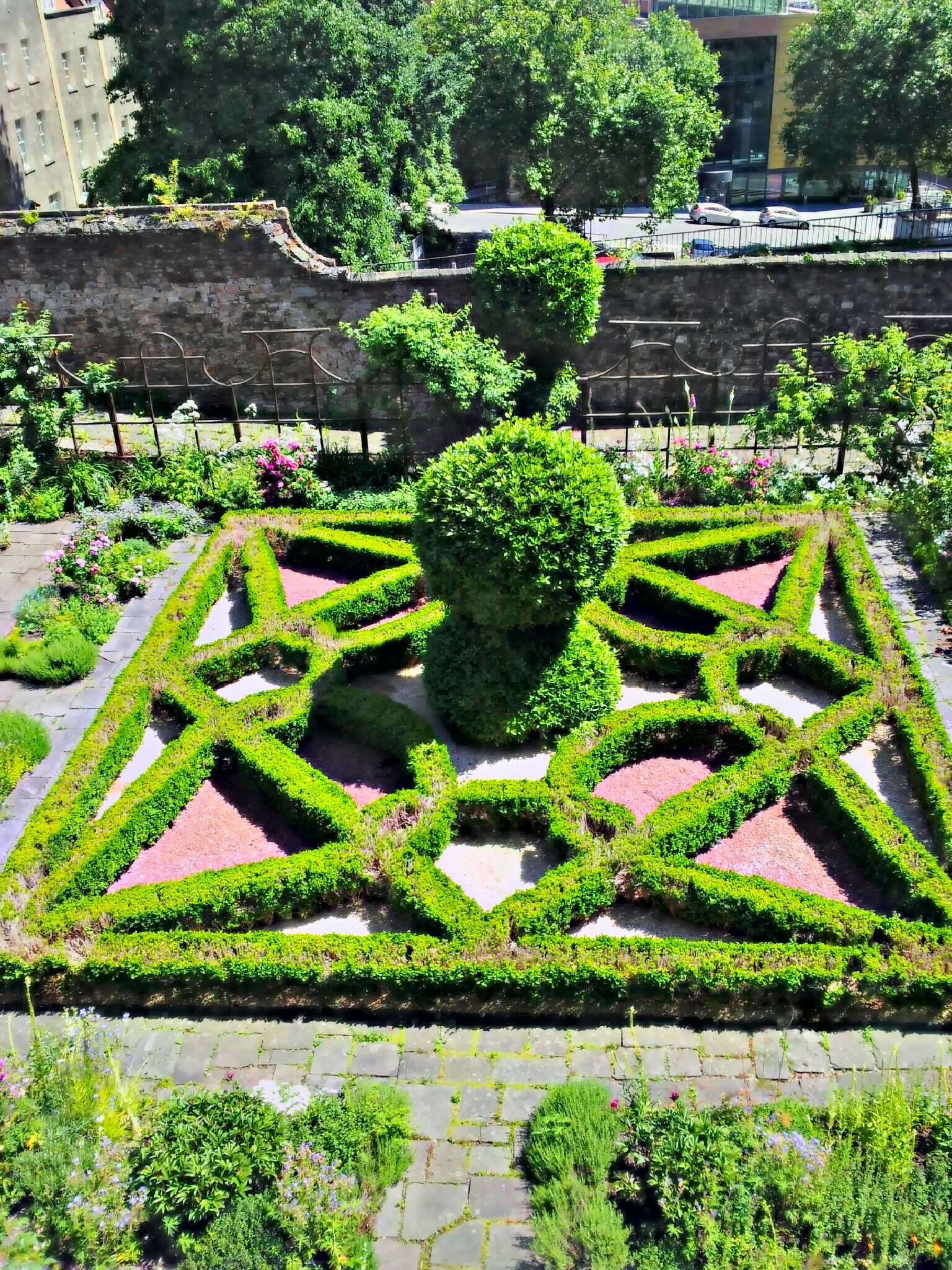
The Elizabethan Knot Garden

The garden seen from the parlour and Great Oak Room is a 1980s interpretation of an Elizabethan knot garden. The box hedge 'knot' is copied from the design incorporated into the ceiling of the bedroom. Herbs and flowers are mixed together in beds as was the fashion in the 1630s, and all the plants used would have been common in a similar garden of the period. The trellis is copied from a French seventeenth century design.

== Media and modern-day usage ==
=== Art and sculpture ===
In 2006, Bristol City Council, Arts Council England and Bristol Museum and Art Gallery partnered with Plan 9 for a one-off modern sculpture exhibition at the Red Lodge.

Responding to the building, the selected artists take on board sensitivities of politics past, ongoing preservation, and today's nervy ambiguities. The works contrast and [complement] the architecture and decoration of the Red Lodge but none sit too comfortably, and the friction they create subtly transforms this Elizabethan house.

=== Media and performance ===
The Ithaca Axis performed a roaming piece of theatre, parts of which were set in the Great Oak Room and the garden. In 2013, Galliard Films made an online documentary as a fun, informal way of looking into some of the history of the Red Lodge.

On 10 February 2016, the Red Lodge was used in the BBC Four documentary Queen Elizabeth I: A Timewatch Guide with shots of Vanessa Collingridge in the Reception Room, Great Oak Room, and knot garden.

In December 2020, local poet Emma Williams published 'The Wicked Girls of Red Lodge' as writer in residence at Red Lodge, part of the Poetic City project. The podcast, artwork and blogpost used the archives including Mary Carpenter's journals as a starting point to imagine the lives of the girls living in Red Lodge when it was a Victorian reform school.

== See also ==
- The Georgian House Museum
- Bristol City Museum and Art Gallery
- Bristol Archives
- Blaise Castle House Museum
