= Ronald Millar =

British actor and writer (1919–1998)

Sir Ronald Millar
- Born: 12 November 1919; Reading, Berkshire, England
- Died: 16 April 1998 (aged 78); London, England
- Occupations: Actor; writer

Sir Ronald Graeme Millar (12 November 1919 – 16 April 1998) was an English actor, scriptwriter, and dramatist. He also had a noteworthy career as a political speechwriter in the Conservative Party, and was particularly known for his collaboration with Margaret Thatcher.

== Background ==
Millar was born in Reading, Berkshire, on 12 November 1919. He was the son of a professional actress, Dorothy Dacre-Hill, and his father died when he was a year old. After attending Charterhouse School, Millar studied at King's College, Cambridge, for a year before joining the Royal Navy in 1940, during the Second World War.

Prior to becoming a full-time dramatist and then a speechwriter, he acted in a number of West End productions during and after World War II, in the company of luminaries as Ivor Novello, Alastair Sim and John Gielgud. He also appeared in the 1943 war film We Dive at Dawn directed by Anthony Asquith. One of his most well-received productions was Abelard and Heloise featuring Keith Michell and Diana Rigg.

== Career ==
He established himself as a playwright after the war and, between 1948 and 1954, worked in Hollywood, writing scripts for MGM. These included The Miniver Story and Scaramouche, both with George Froeschel.

On his return to Britain, he successfully adapted several C. P. Snow novels, The Affair, The New Men and The Masters. In 1967 he adapted William Clark's novel Number 10 – for the stage. He also wrote the book and lyrics for the musical Robert and Elizabeth. He was deputy chairman of the Theatre Royal Haymarket from 1977 until his death.

=== Speechwriting ===
Millar began his speechwriting career in 1969, writing for Edward Heath, but Heath reportedly did not appreciate his work. He had a far longer and more successful collaboration with Margaret Thatcher when she became Conservative leader in 1975. He would edit drafts in a process called "Ronnification", condensing long phrases and fitting the speech to the style of the speaker. The first speech that Millar wrote for Thatcher included an Abraham Lincoln quote, "you cannot help the poor by destroying the rich". Among his most famous contributions for Thatcher was the line "The lady's not for turning". Millar also suggested that Thatcher, on her entrance to 10 Downing Street, should use the words that were attributed to St Francis of Assisi: "Where there is discord, let us bring harmony". He was knighted after Thatcher became Prime Minister in 1979.

He worked with Thatcher throughout her premiership, and continued with John Major.

== Death ==
Millar died at King Edward VII's Hospital in London on 16 April 1998, at the age of 78. Paying tribute, Thatcher said that he helped her "express what I felt and meant" and that he was a man of remarkable artistic abilities and a "real believer in our whole philosophy'". John Major called him "a source of wise advice and wry comment".

== Selected filmography ==
- Frieda (1947)
- So Evil My Love (1948)
- Train of Events (1949)
- The Miniver Story (1950)
- The Unknown Man (1951)
- Scaramouche (1952)
- Never Let Me Go (1953)
- Rose Marie (1954)
- Betrayed (1954)

== Selected plays ==
- Frieda (1946)
- Waiting for Gillian (1954)
- The Bride and the Bachelor (1956)
- The Big Tickle (1958)
- Abelard and Heloise (1970)
