= Timeline of twentieth-century theatre =

The following timeline of twentieth-century theatre offers a year-by-year account of the performance and publication of notable works of drama and significant events in the history of theatre during the 20th century. Musical theatre works are excluded from the list below.

== 1900 ==
- David Belasco – Madame Butterfly
- José Echegaray – El loco Dios (The Madman Divine)
- Clyde Fitch – Captain Jinks of the Horse Marines
- Herman Heijermans – Op Hoop van Zegen
- James Herne – Sag Harbor
- Haralamb Lecca – Quarta. Jucătoriĭ de cărțĭ
- George Moore – The Bending of the Bough: a comedy in five acts
- George Bernard Shaw – Captain Brassbound's Conversion
- Arthur Schnitzler – La Ronde (German: Reigen; privately printed)
- August Strindberg
  - The Dance of Death (Dödsdansen)
  - Easter (Påsk)
  - To Damascus (Till Damaskus) opens in Sweden
- Hermann Sudermann – Fires of St. John

== 1901 ==
- Gabriele D'Annunzio – Francesca da Rimini
- J. M. Barrie – Quality Street
- Roberto Bracco – Lost in the Dark (Sperduti nel buio)
- Hall Caine – The Eternal City
- Anton Chekhov – Three Sisters
- Clyde Fitch – The Climbers
- Haralamb Lecca – Quinta. Suprema forță
- Wilhelm Meyer-Förster – Old Heidelberg (Alt Heidelberg)
- Louis N. Parker – The Cardinal
- August Strindberg – A Dream Play (Ett drömspel, published)
- Stanisław Wyspiański
  - Warszawianka (Varsovian Anthem, stage première)
  - The Wedding (Wesele)

== 1902 ==
- J. M. Barrie – The Admirable Crichton
- Gordon Bottomley – The Crier by Night
- Gaston Arman de Caillavet and Robert de Flers – Le Cœur a ses raisons
- Constantin Dobrescu-Argeș – În sat sau la oraș (In the Village or in the City, first performance)
- Clyde Fitch – The Girl with the Green Eyes
- Cosmo Gordon-Lennox – The Marriage of Kitty
- Maxim Gorky – The Lower Depths
- Haralamb Lecca – Septima. Câiniĭ
- Maurice Maeterlinck – Monna Vanna
- Frank Wedekind – King Nicolo
- W. B. Yeats – Cathleen Ní Houlihan

== 1903 ==
- Dusé Mohamed Ali – The Jew's Revenge
- Jacinto Benavente – La noche del sábado (Saturday Night)
- Haralamb Lecca – Cancer la inimă
- André de Lorde – Le Système du docteur Goudron et du professeur Plume
- W. Somerset Maugham – A Man of Honour
- René Morax – La Dîme
- Ștefan Petică – Frații
- Florencio Sánchez – M'hijo el dotor (My son, the doctor)
- George Bernard Shaw – Man and Superman (published)
- J. M. Synge – In the Shadow of the Glen
- Pierre Wolff – The Secret of Polichinelle (Le Secret de Polichinelle)
- Stanisław Wyspiański – Wyzwolenie (Liberation)

== 1904 ==
- J. M. Barrie – Peter Pan
- Hall Caine – The Prodigal Son
- Anton Chekhov – The Cherry Orchard
- Gabriele D'Annunzio – The Daughter of Iorio
- Octave Mirbeau – Farces and Moralities
- Erich Mühsam – The Con Men
- George Bernard Shaw – John Bull's Other Island
- Tsubouchi Shōyō (坪内 逍遥)
  - Kiri Hitoha (A Paulownia Leaf; performed)
  - Shinkyoku Urashima (The New Urashima)
- J. M. Synge – Riders to the Sea
- Edgar Wallace – An African Millionaire
- Frank Wedekind – Pandora's Box
- Nik Welter – Die Söhne des Öslings
- Stanisław Wyspiański – November Night (Noc listopadowa)

== 1905 ==
- David Belasco – The Girl of the Golden West
- Jacinto Benavente – Rosas de otoño (Autumn Roses)
- Clyde Fitch – The Woman in the Case
- Maxim Gorky – Children of the Sun (Дети солнца, Deti solntsa)
- Harley Granville-Barker – The Voysey Inheritance
- Sacha Guitry
  - Le KWTZ
  - Nono
- Alois Jirásek – Lantern
- Rainis – Uguns un nakts (Fire and Night)
- George Bernard Shaw
  - Major Barbara
  - Man and Superman (first staged)
- J. M. Synge – The Well of the Saints
- Alfredo Testoni – Cardinal Lambertini
- Anthony E. Wills
  - All Charley's Fault
  - Liberty Corners

== 1906 ==
- Hall Caine – The Bondman Play
- Benjamin Chapin – Lincoln
- Paul Claudel – Partage de midi (The Break of Midnight, published)
- Owen Davis – Nellie, the Beautiful Cloak Model
- John Galsworthy – The Silver Box
- Paul Gavault and Robert Charvay – Mademoiselle Josette, My Woman
- Maxim Gorky – Barbarians
- Harley Granville-Barker – Waste (refused public performance licence in UK)
- Sacha Guitry – Chez les Zoaques
- Winifred Mary Letts – The Eyes of the Blind
- George Barr McCutcheon – Brewster's Millions (adaptation)
- Emma Orczy (Baroness Orczy) – The Sin of William Jackson

== 1907 ==
- Leonid Andreyev – The Life of Man («Жизнь человека», Zhizn cheloveka, February 22, Komissarzhevskaya Theatre, Saint Petersburg)
- Sholem Asch – Got fun nekome (God of Vengeance)
- Jacinto Benavente – Los intereses creados (The Bonds of Interest)
- Hall Caine – The Christian (new version)
- Georges Feydeau – A Flea in Her Ear (La Puce à l'oreille)
- Henry James – The High Bid
- Agha Hashar Kashmiri – Safed Khoon (adaptation of King Lear)
- Thomas Mann – Fiorenza
- John Masefield – The Campden Wonder
- W. Somerset Maugham – Lady Frederick
- Quintero brothers
  - El traje de luces
  - La patria chica
- George Ranetti – Romeo și Julietta la Mizil
- Victorien Sardou – The Affair of the Poisons (L'affaire des poisons)
- John Millington Synge – The Playboy of the Western World
- Teffi – The Woman Question (published)

== 1908 ==
- J. M. Barrie – What Every Woman Knows
- Jacinto Benavente – Señora ama (The Lady Loves)
- Tristan Bernard – The Brighton Twins (Les Jumeaux de Brighton)
- Alexandre Bisson – Madame X (La Femme X)
- Hall Caine – Pete (new version of The Manxman)
- Maxim Gorky – The Last Ones (Poslednje)
- Maurice Maeterlinck – The Blue Bird (L'Oiseau bleu)
- Octave Mirbeau – Home (Le Foyer)
- Emma Orczy – Beau Brocade
- Alicia Ramsey – Byron
- W. Graham Robertson – Pinkie and the Fairies
- Edward Sheldon – Salvation Nell
- J. M. Synge – The Tinker's Wedding
- Hans Wiers-Jenssen – Anne Pedersdotter (translated as The Witch)
- Israel Zangwill – The Melting Pot

== 1909 ==
Poster by Oskar Kokoschka advertising the première of his play

- Paul Armont and Nicolas Nancey – Théodore et Cie
- Sem Benelli – The Jester's Supper (La cena delle beffe)
- Clyde Fitch – The City
- John Galsworthy – Strife
- Harley Granville-Barker – The Madras House
- Cicely Hamilton – A Pageant of Great Women
- Agha Hashar Kashmiri – Khwab-e-Hasti (The Dream World of Existence)
- Oskar Kokoschka – Murderer, the Hope of Women (Mörder, Hoffnung der Frauen)
- Else Lasker-Schüler – Die Wupper (published)
- André de Lorde – L'horrible expérience
- Ferenc Molnár – Liliom
- Quintero brothers – El patinillo
- George Bernard Shaw – The Shewing-Up of Blanco Posnet

== 1910 ==
- Hall Caine
  - The Bishop's Son (new version of Ben-my-Chree)
  - The Eternal Question (new version of The Eternal City)
- George Diamandy
  - Bestia (The Beast)
  - Tot înainte (Carry On)
- Maxim Gorky – Reception («Встреча», Vstrecha; also published as Children («Дети», Deti))
- Terence MacSwiney – The Last Warriors of Coole
- Maurice Maeterlinck – Mary Magdalene
- Eduardo Marquina – En Flandes se ha puesto el sol (The Sun Has Set in Flanders)
- John Masefield – The Tragedy of Pompey the Great
- Louis N. Parker – Pomander Walk
- Edmond Rostand – Chantecler
- George Bernard Shaw – Misalliance
- J. M. Synge – Deirdre of the Sorrows
- Rabindranath Tagore – Raja (রাজা, The King of the Dark Chamber)

== 1911 ==
- Hugo Ball – Die Nase des Michelangelo. Tragikomödie in vier Auftritten
- Tristan Bernard – The Little Cafe (Le petit café)
- Hall Caine – The Quality of Mercy (Also known as The Unwritten Law; a new version of Jan the Icelander)
- George Diamandy – Dolorosa
- St. John Greer Ervine – Mixed Marriage
- A. de Herz
  - Biruința (Victory)
  - Când ochii plâng (When Eyes Shed Tears)
- Edward Knoblock – Kismet
- Gregorio Martínez Sierra
  - Canción de cuna (Cradle Song)
  - Primavera en otoño (Spring in Autumn)
- Charles McEvoy – All That Matters
- [Mrs] Clifford Mills – Where the Rainbow Ends
- Emma Orczy – The Duke's Wager
- Louis N. Parker – Disraeli
- Rainis – Indulis un Ārija (Indulis and Ārija)
- Arthur Schnitzler – Das weite Land (The Vast Domain, The Distant Land, or Undiscovered Country)
- George Bernard Shaw – Fanny's First Play
- Karl Vollmöller – The Miracle (Das Mirakel)
- Hugo von Hofmannsthal – Jedermann
- W. B. Yeats – The Countess Cathleen (adapted for performance)

== 1912 ==
- Arnold Bennett – Milestones
- Paul Claudel – L'Annonce faite à Marie (The Tidings Brought to Mary, first performed)
- George Diamandy – Rațiunea de stat (The Reason of State)
- Dietrich Eckart – adaptation of Henrik Ibsen's Peer Gynt
- Louis Esson – The Time Is Not Yet Ripe
- John Galsworthy – The Eldest Son
- Hugo von Hofmannsthal – Everyman, adapted as Jedermann
- Stanley Houghton – The Younger Generation
- Georg Kaiser – From Morning to Midnight (Von Morgens bis Mitternachts) (written)
- Heinrich Mann – Die grosse Liebe (The Great Love, published)
- J. Hartley Manners – Peg o' My Heart
- Louis N. Parker – Drake of England
- Arthur Schnitzler – Professor Bernhardi
- George Bernard Shaw – Pygmalion (published)
- G. K. Sowerby – Rutherford and Son

== 1913 ==
- Franz Arnold and Ernst Bach – The Spanish Fly (Die spanische Fliege)
- Jacinto Benavente – The Unloved Woman (La malquerida)
- Arnold Bennett – The Great Adventure
- George A. Birmingham – General John Regan
- G. K. Chesterton – Magic
- Montague Glass and Charles Klein – Potash and Perlmutter
- A. de Herz
  - Păianjenul (The Spider)
  - Bunicul (Grandfather)
- Stanley Houghton
  - The Perfect Cure
  - Trust the People
- Victor Ido – Karinda Adinda
- D. H. Lawrence – The Daughter-in-Law (first performed 1967)
- Oskar Luts – Kapsapea (The Cabbage)
- Gregorio Martínez Sierra
  - Mamá (Mama)
  - Sólo para mujeres (For Women Only)
- Vladimir Mayakovsky – Vladimir Mayakovsky («Владимир Маяковский»)
- Edward Sheldon – Romance
- Carl Sternheim – Bürger Schippel (Citizen Schippel)

== 1914 ==
- Lascelles Abercrombie – The End of the World (September, Birmingham, England)
- Frank Craven – Too Many Cooks (February 24, New York)
- John Drinkwater – Rebellion
- Lord Dunsany – Five Plays (publication)
- Harley Granville-Barker – Vote By Ballot
- D. H. Lawrence – The Widowing of Mrs. Holroyd (publication, revised version)
- John Howard Lawson – Atmosphere
- Terence MacSwiney – The Revolutionist (publication)
- Roi Cooper Megrue and Walter Hackett – It Pays to Advertise
- Ramanbhai Neelkanth – Raino Parvat
- Elmer Rice – On Trial
- Edward Sheldon – The Song of Songs
- J. E. Harold Terry and Lechmere Worrall – The Man Who Stayed at Home (also The White Feather)
- E. Temple Thurston – The Evolution of Katherine
- Horace Annesley Vachell – Quinneys

== 1915 ==
- Leonid Andreyev – He Who Gets Slapped
- Susan Glaspell – Suppressed Desires
- Maxim Gorky – The Old Man
- Avery Hopwood
  - Fair and Warmer
  - Sadie Love
- Agha Hashar Kashmiri – Bilwamangal
- Cleves Kinkead – Common Clay
- Louis N. Parker – Mavourneen
- Patrick Pearse – The Singer (written)
- Quintero brothers
  - Becquerina
  - Diana cazadora
- Caton Theodorian – Bujoreștii
- Horace Annesley Vachell – The Case of Lady Camber

== 1916 ==
- Jacinto Benavente – Campo de armiño (Ermine Field)
- Hall Caine
  - The Prime Minister
  - The Iron Hand (also known as The Call of the King)
- Luigi Chiarelli – La maschera e il volto: grottesco in tre atti (The Mask and the Face)
- Ernest Fenollosa and Ezra Pound (translated & edited) – Certain Noble Plays of Japan (published)
- Susan Glaspell – Trifles
- Harley Granville-Barker – Farewell to the Theatre
- Sacha Guitry – Let's Make a Dream
- Walter Hackett - The Barton Mystery
- Franz Kafka – The Warden of the Tomb (Der Gruftwächter; writing commenced)
- Jack London – The Acorn Planter: A California Forest Play
- André de Lorde – Le Laboratoire des hallucinations
- Gregorio Martínez Sierra – El reino de Dios (The Kingdom of God)
- Allan Monkhouse – Night Watches: a comedy in one act
- Eden Phillpotts – The Farmer's Wife
- Sophie Treadwell – Claws
- W. B. Yeats – At the Hawk's Well (private performance)

== 1917 ==
- Leonid Andreyev – The Life of Man
- Guillaume Apollinaire – The Breasts of Tiresias (Les mamelles de Tirésias, written 1903, first performed)
- Bruce Bairnsfather and Arthur Elliot – The Better 'Ole
- J. M. Barrie – Dear Brutus
- Dorothy Brandon – Wild Heather
- Ferdinand Bruckner – Der Herr in den Nebeln
- Hall Caine – The Woman Thou Gavest Me
- Gilbert Cannan – Everybody's Husband
- Jean Cocteau – Parade
- John Drinkwater – X = 0: A Night of the Trojan War
- John Galsworthy – Justice
- Mary P. Hamlin and George Arliss – Hamilton
- Georg Kaiser
  - The Burghers of Calais (Die Bürger von Calais, written 1913, first performed)
  - The Coral (Die Koralle)
  - From Morning to Midnight (Von Morgens bis Mitternachts, written 1912, first performed)
- Somerset Maugham – Our Betters
- A. A. Milne – Wurzel-Flummery
- Luigi Pirandello – Right You Are (if you think so)
- Gertrude Stein – An Exercise in Analysis
- Ridgely Torrence – Three Plays for a Negro Theater
- Brita von Horn – Kring drottningen
- Jesse Lynch Williams – Why Marry?

== 1918 ==
- Bertolt Brecht – Baal (written)
- John Drinkwater – Abraham Lincoln
- Marcel Gerbidon and Paul Armont – School for Coquettes (L'École des cocottes)
- Susan Glaspell – Tickless Time
- Walter Hackett – The Freedom of the Seas
- Hugo von Hofmannsthal – The Difficult Man
- James Joyce – Exiles
- Georg Kaiser – Gas
- Alice Dunbar Nelson – Mine Eyes Have Seen
- Gregorio Martínez Sierra – Sueño de Una Noche de Agosto (Dream of an August Night)
- Vladimir Mayakovsky – Mystery-Bouffe («Мистерия-Буфф», Misteriya-Buff)
- Emma Orczy (Baroness Orczy) – The Legion of Honour (adaptation of A Sheaf of Bluebells)
- Luigi Pirandello
  - But It's Nothing Serious (Ma non è una cosa seria)
  - The Rules of the Game (Il giuoco delle parti, literally The Game of Rôles)

== 1919 ==
- Ramón del Valle-Inclán – Divine Words (Divinas palabras)
- Edward Salisbury Field – Wedding Bells
- John Galsworthy – The First and the Last
- Susan Glaspell – Bernice
- Harley Granville-Barker – The Secret Life
- Ian Hay – Tilly of Bloomsbury
- Robert Hichens – The Voice from the Minaret
- Avery Hopwood – The Gold Diggers
- Karl Kraus – The Last Days of Mankind (Die letzten Tage der Menschheit)
- Kwee Tek Hoay – Allah jang Palsoe (The False God)
- Else Lasker-Schüler – Die Wupper (The (river) Wupper; first performed, written 1908)
- H. F. Maltby – A Temporary Gentleman
- W. Somerset Maugham – Caesar's Wife
- A. A. Milne
  - The Camberley Triangle
  - Mr. Pim Passes By
- Louis N. Parker – Summertime
- Liviu Rebreanu – The Quadrille
- Ernst Toller – Transformation

== 1920 ==
- S. Ansky – The Dybbuk (first performed, in author's Yiddish translation as דֶער דִבּוּק צִווִישֶן צְווַיי ווֶעלְטֶן, Tzvishn Zwey Weltn – der Dibuk)
- J. M. Barrie
  - A Kiss For Cinderella
  - Mary Rose
- Karel Čapek – R.U.R. (Rossum's Universal Robots)
- Nikolai Evreinov – The Storming of the Winter Palace
- John Galsworthy – The Skin Game
- Walter Hackett – Mr. Todd's Experiment
- Georg Kaiser – Gas II
- Edward Knoblock – Mumsie
- Vladimir Mayakovsky – The Championship of the Universal Class Struggle
- Eugene O'Neill – The Emperor Jones
- Mary Roberts Rinehart and Avery Hopwood – The Bat
- Ernst Toller – Man and Masses (Masse Mensch)
- Louis Verneuil – Daniel
- Stanisław Ignacy Witkiewicz – They (Oni)

== 1921 ==
- Hjalmar Bergman – Farmor och vår Herre (Grandmother and Our Lord, translated as Thy Rod and Thy Staff)
- Dorothy Brandon – Araminta Arrives
- Karel Čapek – R.U.R. (Rossum's Universal Robots) (performed)
- Karel and Josef Čapek – Pictures from the Insects' Life (Ze života hmyzu, published)
- Clemence Dane – A Bill of Divorcement
- Brandon Fleming – The Eleventh Commandment
- Gerald du Maurier – Bulldog Drummond (with H.C. McNeile)
- Susan Glaspell – Inheritors (written) and The Verge (performed)
- Ian Hay – A Safety Match
- A. de Herz – Mărgeluș (Tiny Bead)
- Avery Hopwood – The Demi-Virgin
- A. A. Milne – The Truth About Blayds
- René Morax – Le Roi David
- Roland Pertwee – Out to Win
- Luigi Pirandello – Six Characters in Search of an Author
- Sophie Treadwell - Rights
- Tristan Tzara – The Gas Heart
- Edgar Wallace – M'Lady
- Raden Adipati Aria Muharam Wiranatakusumah – Lutung Kasarung
- Stanisław Ignacy Witkiewicz – The Water Hen (Kurka Wodna)

== 1922 ==
- Imtiaz Ali Taj – Anarkali
- Arnolt Bronnen – Parricide (Vatermord)
- Karel Čapek – The Makropulos Affair (Věc Makropulos)
- Jean Cocteau – Antigone
- J. B. Fagan (adaptation) – Treasure Island
- Arthur Goodrich – So This Is London
- Ian Hay – The Happy Ending
- Hugo von Hofmannsthal – The Great World Theatre (Das Salzburger große Welttheater)
- Lauw Giok Lan – Pendidikan jang Kliroe
- Eugene O'Neill – The Hairy Ape
- Ouyang Yuqian (欧阳予倩) – After Returning Home (回家以后)
- Luigi Pirandello
  - Henry IV (Enrico IV)
  - Clothing the Naked (Vestire gli ignudi)
  - The Imbecile (L'imbecille)
- Percy Bysshe Shelley – The Cenci (first public performance in England)
- Carl Sternheim – The Fossil (Das Fossil)
- Tian Han (田漢)
  - A Night in the Coffee Shop (Kafeidian Yi Ye)
  - Before Lunch (Wufan Zhiqian))
- Ernst Toller – The Machine-Wreckers (Die Maschinenstürmer)
- Ben Travers – The Dippers
- Arthur Valentine – Tons of Money
- John Willard – The Cat and the Canary

== 1923 ==
- Dorothy Brandon – The Outsider
- Bertolt Brecht – In the Jungle of Cities
- Gerald du Maurier – The Dancers
- Ian Hay – Good Luck
- Garnet Holme (adapted from Helen Hunt Jackson) – The Ramona Pageant
- Georg Kaiser – Side by Side (Nebeneinander)
- Charles McEvoy – The Likes of Her
- Seán O'Casey – The Shadow of a Gunman
- Elmer Rice – The Adding Machine
- Arnold Ridley – The Ghost Train
- Jules Romains – Knock (Knock, ou le Triomphe de la médecine)
- George Bernard Shaw – Saint Joan
- Marie Stopes – Our Ostriches
- Ernst Toller – Hinkemann
- Sergei Tretyakov
  - Do You Hear, Moscow? (Слышишь, Москва?!)
  - Earth in Turmoil
- Sutton Vane – Outward Bound
- Stanisław Ignacy Witkiewicz
  - The Crazy Locomotive (Szalona lokomotywa)
  - Janulka, Daughter of Fizdejko (Janulka, córka Fizdejki)
  - The Madman and the Nun (Wariat i zakonnica)

== 1924 ==
- Maxwell Anderson and Laurence Stallings – What Price Glory?
- Louis Aragon – Backs to the Wall
- Bertolt Brecht – The Life of Edward II of England (Leben Eduards des Zweiten von England, adapted from Marlowe)
- Mikhail Bulgakov – The Fatal Eggs (Роковые яйца)
- Alberto Casella – La morte in vacanza (Death Takes a Holiday)
- Noël Coward
  - The Vortex (first performed)
  - Hay Fever (written)
  - Easy Virtue (written)
- Ramón del Valle-Inclán – Bohemian Lights (Luces de Bohemia)
- Henri Duvernois and Pierre Wolff – After Love
- Nikolai Erdman – The Mandate (Мандат)
- Ian Hay – The Sport of Kings
- Agha Hashar Kashmiri – Aankh ka Nasha
- George S. Kaufman and Marc Connelly – Beggar on Horseback
- Frederick Lonsdale
  - The Fake
  - The Street Singer
- Ivor Novello – The Rat
- Seán O'Casey – Juno and the Paycock
- Eugene O'Neill – Desire Under the Elms
- E. Phillips Oppenheim – The Passionate Quest
- Louis N. Parker – Our Nell
- Henrik Rytter – Herman Ravn
- Githa Sowerby – The Stepmother (written)
- Sergei Tretyakov – The Gas Masks (Противогазы)
- Tristan Tzara – Handkerchief of Clouds (Mouchoir de Nuages)
- Sutton Vane – Falling Leaves
- Stanisław Ignacy Witkiewicz – The Mother (Matka)

== 1925 ==
- J. R. Ackerley – The Prisoners of War
- Arnolt Bronnen – The Bird of Youth (Geburt der Jugend)
- Mikhail Bulgakov – Zoyka's Apartment (written)
- Noël Coward – Hay Fever (first performed) and Fallen Angels
- Joseph Jefferson Farjeon – Number 17
- Federico García Lorca – The Billy-Club Puppets (Los títeres de cachiporra)
- Patrick Hastings – The River
- Hugo von Hofmannsthal – The Tower (Der Turm)
- Keble Howard – Lord Babs
- Zora Neale Hurston – Color Struck
- George Kelly – Craig's Wife
- John Howard Lawson – Processional
- Ben Travers – A Cuckoo in the Nest
- John Van Druten – Young Woodley
- Franz Werfel – Juarez und Maximilian
- Stanisław Ignacy Witkiewicz – The Beelzebub Sonata (Sonata Belzebuba)
- Carl Zuckmayer – The Merry Vineyard (Der fröhliche Weinberg)

== 1926 ==
- Dorothy Brandon – Blind Alley
- Bertolt Brecht – Man Equals Man (Mann ist Mann)
- Mikhail Bulgakov – The Days of the Turbins («Дни Турбиных»)
- G. D. H. Cole – The Striker Stricken
- St. John Greer Ervine – Anthony and Anna
- J. B. Fagan – And So To Bed
- Joseph Jefferson Farjeon – After Dark
- John Galsworthy – Escape
- Patrick Hastings – Scotch Mist
- Zora Neale Hurston – Color Struck (published)
- Seán O'Casey – The Plough and the Stars
- Eden Phillpotts – Blue Comet
- Ben Travers – Rookery Nook
- Sergei Tretyakov – I Want a Baby («Хочу ребёнка»)

== 1927 ==
- Isaac Babel – Sunset
- Philip Barry – Paris Bound
- Noel Pemberton Billing – High Treason
- Bertolt Brecht – In The Jungle of Cities (Im Dickicht der Städte in its final version)
- Mikhail Bulgakov – Flight («Бег», Beg, written)
- Noël Coward
  - Home Chat
  - The Marquise
- Hamilton Deane – Dracula (1927 revision of a 1924 stage adaptation)
- James Bernard Fagan – The Greater Love
- Federico García Lorca
  - Mariana Pineda
  - The Curse of the Butterfly (El Maleficio de la Mariposa) (first production, in Teatro Eslava, Madrid)
- Joseph Goebbels – Der Wanderer (only performances; written 1923)
- Walter Hackett – The Wicked Earl
- DuBose Heyward and Dorothy Heyward – Porgy
- Vsevolod Ivanov – Armoured Train 14-69 («Бронепоезд 14-69», Bronepoezd 14-69)
- Georgia Douglas Johnson – Plumes
- George S. Kaufman and Edna Ferber – The Royal Family
- John Howard Lawson – Loud Speaker
- Alexander Lernet-Holenia – Szene als Einleitung zu einer Totenfeier für Rainer Maria Rilke
- Frederick Lonsdale – The High Road
- W. Somerset Maugham – The Letter
- Harrison Owen – The Happy Husband
- Ernst Toller – Hoppla, We're Alive! (Hoppla, wir leben!)
- Ben Travers – Thark
- Jim Tully – Twenty Below
- John Van Druten
  - Chance Acquaintance
  - Diversion
- Bayard Veiller – The Trial of Mary Dugan
- Roger Vitrac – The Mysteries of Love (Les Mystères de l'amour)
- Frank Vosper – The Combined Maze
- Edgar Wallace
  - Double Dan
  - The Terror
- Emlyn Williams – Full Moon
- Carl Zuckmayer – Schinderhannes

== 1928 ==
- Jacinto Benavente – Pepa Doncel
- Charles Bennett
  - Blackmail
  - The Last Hour
- Bertolt Brecht – The Threepenny Opera
- Joe Corrie – In Time o' Strife
- Eduardo De Filippo – Filosoficamente
- Nikolai Erdman – The Suicide («Самоубийца», written)
- Marieluise Fleißer – Pioneers in Ingolstadt (Pioniere in Ingolstadt)
- Garrett Fort – Jarnegan
- Agha Hashar Kashmiri – Sita Banbas (published)
- Kwee Tek Hoay (郭德懷)– Korbannja Yi Yong Toen (Victims of Yi Yong Toen, published serially)
- Patrick Hastings – The Moving Finger
- Monckton Hoffe – Many Waters
- Daniil Kharms – Elizabeth Bam («Елизавета Бам»)
- Miroslav Krleža – The Glembays (Gospoda Glembajevi)
- John Howard Lawson – The International
- Alexander Lernet-Holenia, as Clemens Neydisser, and Stefan Zweig – Gelegenheit macht Liebe (Opportunity creates love) or Quiproquo
- Federico García Lorca – The Love of Don Perlimplín and Belisa in the Garden (Amor de Don Perlimplín con Belisa en su jardín, written)
- Walter Hackett – Other Men's Wives
- W. Somerset Maugham – The Sacred Flame
- Ivor Novello – The Truth Game
- Eugene O'Neill – Strange Interlude (first staging)
- Eugen Ortner – Meier Helmbrecht
- Ouyang Yuqian (欧阳予倩) – Pan Jinlian (潘金蓮)
- R. C. Sherriff – Journey's End
- Ben Travers – Plunder
- Sophie Treadwell – Machinal
- John Van Druten – The Return of the Soldier
- Louis Verneuil – Monsieur Lamberthier
- Roger Vitrac – Victor, or Power to the Children (Victor, ou les enfants au pouvoir)
- Edgar Wallace
  - The Lad
  - The Man Who Changed His Name
  - The Squeaker
- Carl Zuckmayer – Katharina Knie

== 1929 ==
- Jacinto Benavente – Vidas cruzadas (Short Cuts)
- Henri Bernstein – Mélo
- Bertolt Brecht – The Baden-Baden Lesson on Consent (Badener Lehrstück vom Einverständnis)
- Ferdinand Bruckner – Krankheit der Jugend (Illness of Youth)
- St. John Ervine – The First Mrs. Fraser
- Jean Giraudoux – Amphitryon 38
- Walter Hackett – Sorry You've Been Troubled
- Patrick Hamilton – Rope
- Denis Johnston – The Old Lady Says "No!"
- Agha Hashar Kashmiri – Rustom O Sohrab
- Frederick Lonsdale – Canaries Sometimes Sing
- A. A. Milne
  - Michael and Mary
  - Toad of Toad Hall (adapted from Kenneth Grahame)
- Kaj Munk – I Brændingen
- Eugene O'Neill – Dynamo
- Marcel Pagnol – Marius
- Stanisława Przybyszewska – The Danton Case (Sprawa Dantona)
- Ernest Raymond – The Berg
- Elmer Rice – Street Scene
- Arnold Ridley – Keepers of Youth
- George Bernard Shaw – The Apple Cart
- Ahmed Shawqi – Masraa' Kliyubatra (The Death of Cleopatra)
- John Van Druten – After All
- Ödön von Horváth – Rund um den Kongreß
- Edgar Wallace
  - The Calendar
  - Persons Unknown

== 1930 ==
- Rudolf Besier – The Barretts of Wimpole Street
- Antoine Bibesco – Ladies All
- Bertolt Brecht
  - Rise and Fall of the City of Mahagonny (Aufstieg und Fall der Stadt Mahagonny)
  - The Decision (Die Maßnahme)
- Ferdinand Bruckner – Elisabeth von England (Elizabeth of England)
- Jean Cocteau – The Human Voice (La Voix humaine)
- Marc Connelly – The Green Pastures
- Noël Coward – Private Lives
- Ian Hay and Guy Bolton – A Song of Sixpence
- Ian Hay and P. G. Wodehouse – Leave It to Psmith
- Georgia Douglas Johnson – Blue-Eyed Black Boy
- Fred Duprez – My Wife's Family
- Geoffrey Kerr – London Calling
- Kwee Tek Hoay – Nonton Tjapgome (Watching the Lantern Festival)
- Federico García Lorca
  - The Public (El público) (written)
  - The Shoemaker's Prodigious Wife (La zapatera prodigiosa)
- Patrick MacGill – Suspense
- Will Scott – The Limping Man
- Edgar Wallace
  - On the Spot
  - The Mouthpiece
  - Smoky Cell
- Emlyn Williams – A Murder Has Been Arranged
- Christa Winsloe – Ritter Nérestan (written as Gestern und heute, translated as Children in Uniform)
- W. B. Yeats – The Words Upon The Window Pane

== 1931 ==
- Clifford Bax – The Venetian
- Charles Bennett – Sensation
- James Bridie – The Anatomist
- Chen Liting – Put Down Your Whip (放下你的鞭子, Fàngxià nǐde biānzi)
- Noël Coward – Post-Mortem (published)
- Federico García Lorca – When Five Years Pass (Así que pasen cinco años, written)
- Benn Levy - Springtime for Henry
- Jean Giraudoux – Judith
- Walter Hackett –
  - The Gay Adventure
  - Good Losers (with Michael Arlen)
  - Take a Chance
- Ian Hay
  - Mr Faint-Heart
  - The Midshipmaid
- Ronald Jeans
  - Can the Leopard...?
  - Lean Harvest
- Edward Knoblock – Grand Hotel
- André Obey
  - Noé (Noah)
  - Le Viol de Lucrèce (The Rape of Lucretia)
- Eugene O'Neill – Mourning Becomes Electra
- Marcel Pagnol – Fanny
- J. B. Priestley and Edward Knoblock – The Good Companions
- Ahmed Shawqi – Qambeez (Cambyses)
- Dodie Smith – Autumn Crocus
- Gladys Bronwyn Stern – The Man Who Pays The Piper
- John Van Druten
  - Hollywood Holiday
  - London Wall
  - Sea Fever
  - There's Always Juliet
- Ödön von Horváth – Tales from the Vienna Woods (Geschichten aus dem Wiener Wald)
- Edgar Wallace – The Old Man
- Thornton Wilder – The Long Christmas Dinner
- Carl Zuckmayer – The Captain of Köpenick (Der Hauptmann von Köpenick)

== 1932 ==
- S. N. Behrman – Biography
- Elias Canetti – Hochzeit (Wedding)
- Noël Coward – Design for Living (premiered 1933)
- Walter Hackett – Road House
- Ian Hay – Orders Are Orders
- Anthony Kimmins – While Parents Sleep
- Edward Knoblock – Evensong
- Ferdinand Kwasi Fiawoo – Toko Atolia
- George S. Kaufman and Edna Ferber – Dinner at Eight
- W. Somerset Maugham – For Services Rendered
- Harrison Owen – Doctor Pygmalion
- Ahmed Shawqi – Amirat el-Andalus (The Andalusian Princess)
- John Van Druten
  - Behold, We Live
  - Somebody Knows
- Ödön von Horváth – Kasimir und Karoline

== 1933 ==
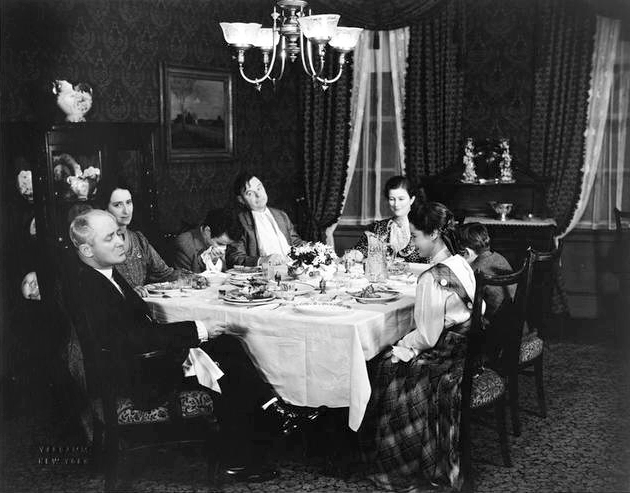
The original Broadway production of Ah, Wilderness!, with George M. Cohan, Elisha Cook, Jr., and Gene Lockhart

- Tawfiq al-Hakim – Ahl el-Kahf (The People of the Cave)
- Jean Anouilh – Mandarine
- Anthony Armstrong
  - Ten Minute Alibi
  - Without Witness
- Clifford Bax – The Rose Without a Thorn
- Ferdinand Bruckner – Die Rassen
- Gordon Daviot (Josephine Tey) – Richard of Bordeaux
- Selli Engler – Heil Hitler
- Walter Hackett – Afterwards
- Ian Hay – A Present from Margate
- Hanns Johst – Schlageter
- Sidney Kingsley – Men in White
- Samuil Lehtțir – Biruința (Victory)
- Federico García Lorca – Blood Wedding
- W. Somerset Maugham – Sheppey
- R. J. Minney – Clive of India
- Ivor Novello – Fresh Fields
- Eugene O'Neill – Ah, Wilderness!
- J. B. Priestley – Laburnum Grove
- Lennox Robinson – Drama at Inish
- Mordaunt Shairp – The Green Bay Tree
- John Van Druten – The Distaff Side
- Maxim Ziese – Siebenstein

== 1934 ==
- Tawfiq al-Hakim – Shahrazad (Scheherazade)
- James Bridie – Mary Read
- Cao Yu – Thunderstorm (雷雨, Léiyǔ)
- Winifred Carter – The Queen Who Kept Her Head
- Max Catto – French Salad
- Jean Cocteau – The Infernal Machine
- Federico García Lorca – Yerma
- Ian Hay – Admirals All
- Lillian Hellman – The Children's Hour
- Frederick J. Jackson – The Bishop Misbehaves
- Pär Lagerkvist – Bödeln (The Hangman; dramatization)
- Eberhard Wolfgang Möller – Rothschild siegt bei Waterloo
- Ayn Rand – Night of January 16th (first performed as Woman on Trial)
- Lawrence Riley – Personal Appearance
- Dodie Smith – Touch Wood
- John Van Druten – Flowers of the Forest
- Paul Vulpius (Ladislas Fodor and Hans Adler) – Youth at the Helm

== 1935 ==
- J. R. Ackerley – The Prisoners of War
- Maxwell Anderson – Winterset
- T. S. Eliot – Murder in the Cathedral
- Federico García Lorca – Doña Rosita the Spinster (Doña Rosita la soltera)
- Norman Ginsbury – Viceroy Sarah
- Jean Giraudoux – The Trojan War Will Not Take Place (La Guerre de Troie n'aura pas lieu)
- Walter Hackett – Espionage
- N. C. Hunter – All Rights Reserved
- Ronald Jeans – The Composite Man
- Anthony Kimmins – Chase the Ace
- Archibald MacLeish – Panic
- Bernard Merivale – The Unguarded Hour
- Clifford Odets
  - Waiting for Lefty
  - Awake and Sing!
- Lawrence Riley – Personal Appearance
- Dodie Smith – Call It a Day
- John Van Druten – Most of the Game
- Emlyn Williams – Night Must Fall

== 1936 ==
- Pralhad Keshav Atre
  - Lagnāchi Bedi
  - Udyāchā Sansār
- W. H. Auden and Christopher Isherwood – The Ascent of F6 (published English edition)
- S. N. Behrman – End of Summer
- Charles Bennett – Page From a Diary
- Bertolt Brecht – Round Heads and Pointed Heads (Die Rundköpfe und die Spitzköpfe)
- Max Catto – Green Waters
- Noël Coward
  - Tonight at 8.30
  - Present Laughter
- Mazo de la Roche and Nancy Price – Whiteoaks
- Henry de Montherlant – Pasiphaé
- Harley Granville-Barker – Waste (first public performance, 1927 version; originally written 1906)
- Ian Hay – The Frog
- George S. Kaufman and Moss Hart – You Can't Take It with You
- Sinclair Lewis and John C. Moffitt – It Can't Happen Here (dramatisation)
- Federico García Lorca – The House of Bernarda Alba (La casa de Bernarda Alba; written)
- Clare Boothe Luce – The Women
- Barré Lyndon – The Amazing Dr. Clitterhouse
- Hugh Mills – Laughter in Court
- J. B. Priestley – Bees on the Boat Deck
- Terence Rattigan – French Without Tears
- Dorothy L. Sayers and Muriel St. Clare Byrne – Busman's Honeymoon: A Detective Comedy in Three Acts
- Irwin Shaw – Bury the Dead
- George Shiels
  - The Jailbird
  - The Passing Day
- Ödön von Horváth
  - Don Juan kommt aus dem Krieg (Don Juan Comes Back From the War)
  - Figaro läßt sich scheiden (Figaro Gets a Divorce)

== 1937 ==
- Anthony Armstrong – Mile Away Murder
- Bertolt Brecht with Margarete Steffin – Die Gewehre der Frau Carrar (adapted from J. M. Synge's Señora Carrar's Rifles)
- Karel Čapek – The White Disease (Bílá nemoc)
- Paul Vincent Carroll – Shadow and Substance
- Jeffrey Dell – Blondie White
- Reginald Denham and Edward Percy Smith
- The Last Straw
- Suspect
- Ian Hay – The Gusher
- Margaret Kennedy – Autumn
- Arthur Kober – "Having Wonderful Time"
- Richard Llewellyn – Poison Pen
- W.P. Lipscomb – Thank You, Mr. Pepys!
- Robert McLellan – Jamie the Saxt
- Robert Morley – Goodness, How Sad
- J. B. Priestley – Time and the Conways
- Walter Charles Roberts – Red Harvest
- Gerald Savory – George and Margaret
- Dodie Smith – Bonnet Over the Windmill
- John Van Druten – Gertie Maude
- Louis Verneuil – The Train for Venice
- Hella Wuolijoki writing as Juhani Tervapää – Juurakon Hulda
- John Ferguson, editor – Seven Famous One-Act Plays (published)

== 1938 ==
- Jean Anouilh – Thieves' Carnival (Le Bal des Voleurs)
- Robert Ardrey – Casey Jones
- Max Catto – They Walk Alone
- Paul Claudel – L'Histoire de Tobie et de Sara (The History of Tobit and Sara, first version)
- M. J. Farrell – Spring Meeting
- Patrick Hamilton – Gaslight
- H.M. Harwood – The Innocent Party
- Esther McCracken – Quiet Wedding
- Kaj Munk – Han sidder ved Smeltediglen (He sits by the melting pot)
- Michael Pertwee – Death on the Table
- J. B. Priestley – When We Are Married
- Gordon Sherry – The Bare Idea
- Robert E. Sherwood – Abe Lincoln in Illinois
- Dodie Smith – Dear Octopus
- Stephen Spender – Trial of a Judge
- Lesley Storm – Tony Draws a Horse
- Arnold Sundgaard
  - Spirochete: A History
  - with Marc Connelly – Everywhere I Roam
- Rodolfo Usigli – El gesticulador
- Theodore Ward – Big White Fog
- Thornton Wilder – Our Town
- Emlyn Williams – The Corn is Green
- Tennessee Williams – Not About Nightingales (written; first performed 1998)
- W. B. Yeats – Purgatory

== 1939 ==
- Philip Barry – The Philadelphia Story
- Bertolt Brecht
  - Life of Galileo (Leben des Galilei; completed)
  - Mother Courage and Her Children (Mutter Courage und ihre Kinder; written)
- Mikhail Bulgakov – Batumi (left unfinished)
- Max Catto – Punch without Judy
- T. S. Eliot – The Family Reunion
- Jean Giraudoux – Ondine
- Ian Hay – Little Ladyship
- Frank Harvey – Saloon Bar
- Lillian Hellman – The Little Foxes
- George S. Kaufman and Moss Hart – The Man Who Came to Dinner
- Joseph Kesselring – Arsenic and Old Lace
- Clare Boothe Luce – Margin for Error
- Hugh Mills and Wells Root – As You Are
- William Saroyan – The Time of Your Life

== 1940 ==
- Jean Anouilh – Léocadia
- Ugo Betti – Il cacciatore di anitre (The Duck Hunter)
- Peter Blackmore – The Blue Goose
- Bertolt Brecht – Mr Puntila and his Man Matti (Herr Puntila und sein Knecht Matti, written)
- Agatha Christie – Peril at End House
- Jean Cocteau – Le Bel indifférent
- Hermann Heuvers – Hosokawa Gracia Fujin
- Artturi Järviluoma – Pohjalaisia
- Terence Rattigan and Anthony Goldsmith – Follow My Leader (first performed)
- Lawrence Riley – Return Engagement
- George Shiels – The Rugged Path
- Vernon Sylvaine – Nap Hand
- John Van Druten –
  - Leave Her to Heaven
  - Old Acquaintance
- Emlyn Williams
  - The Corn Is Green
  - The Light of Heart

== 1941 ==
- Jean Anouilh
  - Eurydice
  - Le Rendez-vous de Senlis
- Bertolt Brecht
  - Mother Courage and Her Children
  - The Resistible Rise of Arturo Ui (written)
- Noël Coward – Blithe Spirit
- Kenneth Horne – Love in a Mist
- Molly Keane – Ducks and Drakes
- Esther McCracken – Quiet Weekend
- Pablo Picasso – Desire Caught by the Tail (Le Désir attrapé par la queue, written)
- Enrique Jardiel Poncela – We Thieves Are Honourable (Los ladrones somos gente honrada)
- Vernon Sylvaine
  - Warn That Man!
  - Women Aren't Angels
- Xavier Villaurrutia – Invitación à la muerte

== 1942 ==
- Jacinto Benavente – La honradez de la cerradura
- Paul Vincent Carroll – The Strings Are False
- Constance Cox – The Romance of David Garrick
- Henry de Montherlant – La Reine morte
- Maurice Druon – Mégarée
- Patrick Hastings – Escort
- Arthur Miller – Thunder from the Hills (radio play)
- Kaj Munk – Niels Ebbesen
- Eugene O'Neill – A Touch of the Poet (written)
- Terence Rattigan – Flare Path
- John Van Druten – The Damask Cheek

== 1943 ==
- Bertolt Brecht
  - The Good Person of Szechwan (Der gute Mensch von Sezuan)
  - Life of Galileo (Leben des Galilei)
- Albert Camus – The Misunderstanding (Le Malentendu)
- Moss Hart – Winged Victory
- Frank Harvey – Brighton Rock
- Fritz Hochwälder – Das Heilige Experiment (The Holy Experiment, The Strong Are Lonely)
- Esther McCracken – Living Room
- Elena Miramova – Dark Eyes
- M. J. Molloy – Old Road
- Armijn Pane – Kami, Perempuan (We, the Women)
- J. B. Priestley – They Came to a City
- Terence Rattigan - While the Sun Shines
- Nelson Rodrigues – Vestido de Noiva (The Wedding Dress)
- Jean-Paul Sartre – The Flies (Les Mouches)
- Ben Travers – She Follows Me About
- Emlyn Williams – The Druid's Rest
- Yang Jiang – As You Desire (Chenxin ruyi)

== 1944 ==
- Jean Anouilh – Antigone
- Reginald Beckwith – A Soldier for Christmas
- Ugo Betti – Corruzione al Palazzo di giustizia (Corruption in the Palace of Justice, written)
- Bertolt Brecht – The Caucasian Chalk Circle (Der Kaukasische Kreidekreis), written
- Mary Chase – Harvey
- Daphne du Maurier – The Years Between
- Balwant Gargi – Lohākuṭ (Blacksmith)
- Philip King – See How They Run
- Max Otto Koischwitz – Vision of Invasion (broadcast propaganda)
- Esther McCracken – No Medals
- J.B. Priestley – How Are They at Home?
- Harold Purcell – The Rest is Silence
- Terence Rattigan - Love In Idleness (rewriting of Less Than Kind)
- Lawrence Riley – Time to Kill
- Jean-Paul Sartre – No Exit (Huis Clos)
- John Van Druten – I Remember Mama
- Franz Werfel – Jacobowsky and the Colonel (Jacobowsky und der Oberst)
- Tennessee Williams – The Glass Menagerie

== 1945 ==
- Jacinto Benavente – La infanzona
- Mary Chase – Harvey
- Warren Chetham-Strode – Young Mrs. Barrington
- Campbell Christie and Dorothy Christie – Grand National Night
- Eduardo De Filippo – Napoli milionaria ("The Millions of Naples")
- Norman Ginsbury – The First Gentleman
- Jean Giraudoux (died 1944) – The Madwoman of Chaillot (La Folle de Chaillot)
- Curt Goetz – The House in Montevideo (Das Haus in Montevideo)
- Walter Greenwood – The Cure for Love
- Arthur Laurents – Home of the Brave
- John Perry – A Man About the House
- Colin Morris – Desert Rats
- J. B. Priestley – An Inspector Calls
- Irwin Shaw – The Assassin
- Edward Percy Smith – The Shop at Sly Corner
- Lesley Storm – Great Day
- Aimée Stuart – Lady from Edinburgh
- Vernon Sylvaine – Madame Louise
- Emlyn Williams – The Wind of Heaven

== 1946 ==
- Arthur Adamov – L'Aveu (The Confession)
- Clifford Bax – Golden Eagle
- S. N. Behrman – Jane
- Ugo Betti – Delitto all'isola delle capre (Crime on Goat Island)
- Jean Cocteau – L'Aigle à deux têtes
- Constance Cox – Vanity Fair
- Eduardo De Filippo
  - Filumena Marturano
  - Questi fantasmi (All these ghosts)
- Eynon Evans – Wishing Well
- Christopher Fry – A Phoenix Too Frequent (verse)
- Kenneth Horne – Fools Rush In
- Frederick Lonsdale – But for the Grace of God
- Ewan MacColl – Uranium 235
- Donagh MacDonagh – Happy as Larry
- Robert McLeish – The Gorbals Story
- Louis MacNeice – The Dark Tower (radio play)
- Bernard Miles – Let Tyrants Tremble!
- Ronald Millar – Frieda
- Henry de Montherlant – Malatesta
- Eugene O'Neill – The Iceman Cometh
- J. B. Priestley – Ever Since Paradise
- Terence Rattigan – The Winslow Boy
- Nelson Rodrigues – Álbum de família
- Carl Zuckmayer – Des Teufels General (The Devil's General)

== 1947 ==
- Jean Anouilh – Invitation to the Castle (L'Invitation au Château)
- Pralhad Keshav Atre – Moruchi Mavshi (adaptation of Charley's Aunt)
- Ugo Betti – Ispezione (The Inquiry)
- Maurice Clavel – Les Incendiaires
- William Douglas-Home
  - The Chiltern Hundreds
  - Now Barabbas
- Jean Genet – The Maids (Les Bonnes)
- Patrick Hastings – The Blind Goddess
- Ian Hay
  - Hattie Stowe
  - Off the Record
- Michael Clayton Hutton – Power Without Glory
- Geoffrey Kerr – The Man in the Street
- Noel Langley and Robert Morley – Edward, My Son
- Arthur Miller – All My Sons
- Ena Lamont Stewart – Men Should Weep
- Ben Travers – Outrageous Fortune
- John Van Druten – The Druid Circle
- A.R. Whatmore – She Wanted a Cream Front Door
- Tennessee Williams – A Streetcar Named Desire

== 1948 ==
- Bertolt Brecht – Antigone, The Caucasian Chalk Circle and Mr Puntila and his Man Matti (Herr Puntila und sein Knecht Matti, first performed)
- Robertson Davies – Overlaid
- Witold Gombrowicz – The Marriage (first published, in Spanish translation)
- Kenneth Horne – A Lady Mislaid
- Margaret Kennedy – Happy with Either
- Junji Kinoshita – Yūzuru (Twilight Crane)
- Dudley Leslie and J. Lee Thompson – The Human Touch
- J.B. Priestley –Home Is Tomorrow
- Terence Rattigan – The Browning Version and Harlequinade
- Jean-Paul Sartre – Dirty Hands (Les Mains sales)
- Vernon Sylvaine - One Wild Oat
- John Van Druten – Make Way for Lucia
- Arthur Watkyn – For Better, for Worse
- Kerala women's Malayalam collective – Thozhil Kendrathilekku (To the Workplace!)

== 1949 ==
- Ugo Betti – Corruzione al Palazzo di giustizia (Corruption in the Palace of Justice, written 1944, first performed)
- Maurice Clavel – La Terrasse de midi
- T. S. Eliot – The Cocktail Party
- Christopher Fry – The Lady's Not for Burning
- Jean Genet – Deathwatch (Haute Surveillance)
- Val Gielgud – Party Manners
- Hugh Hastings – Seagulls Over Sorrento
- Ronald Jeans – Young Wives' Tale
- Sidney Kingsley – Detective Story
- Eric Linklater – Love in Albania
- Alan Melville
  - Castle in the Air
  - Top Secret
- Arthur Miller – Death of a Salesman
- Pablo Picasso – The Four Little Girls (Les Quatre petites filles), first published version
- Lynn Riggs – Out of Dust
- Nelson Rodrigues – Dorotéia

== 1950 ==
- Arthur Adamov
  - La Parodie
  - L'Invasion
  - La Grande et la Petite Manoeuvre
- Bertolt Brecht – The Tutor (Der Hofmeister, adapted from Lenz)
- Wynyard Browne – The Holly and the Ivy
- Emilio Carballido – Rosalba y los Llaveros
- Campbell Christie – His Excellency
- John Dighton – Who Goes There!
- Friedrich Dürrenmatt – Romulus the Great (Romulus der Große)
- Christopher Fry – Venus Observed
- Kermit Hunter – Unto These Hills
- William Inge – Come Back, Little Sheba
- Eugène Ionesco – The Bald Soprano (La Cantatrice chauve)
- Benn Levy – Return to Tyassi
- Frederick Lonsdale – The Way Things Go
- Roger MacDougall
  - The Gentle Gunman
  - To Dorothy, a Son
  - Macadam and Eve
- Esther McCracken – Cry Liberty
- Colin Morris – Reluctant Heroes
- Terence Rattigan – Who Is Sylvia?
- Nelly Sachs – Eli: Ein Mysterienspiel vom Leiden Israels (verse)
- C. P. Snow – View Over the Park
- John Steinbeck – Burning Bright
- Vernon Sylvaine – Will Any Gentleman?

== 1951 ==
- Muriel Box and Sydney Box – The Seventh Veil
- Agatha Christie – The Hollow
- Ian Hay – The White Sheep of the Family
- Kenneth Horne – And This Was Odd
- Michael Clayton Hutton – The Happy Family
- Eugène Ionesco – The Lesson (La Leçon)
- Ronald Jeans – Count Your Blessings
- Maryat Lee – Dope!
- A. A. Milne – Before the Flood
- Lawrence Riley – Kin Hubbard
- Jean-Paul Sartre – The Devil and the Good Lord (Le Diable et le Bon Dieu)
- Peter Ustinov
  - The Love of Four Colonels
  - The Moment of Truth
- John Van Druten – I Am a Camera
- John Whiting
  - A Penny for a Song
  - Saint's Day (first performance)
- Tennessee Williams – The Rose Tattoo

== 1952 ==
- Rodney Ackland – The Pink Room
- Jean Anouilh
  - The Lark (L'Alouette)
  - The Waltz of the Toreadors (La Valse des toréadors)
- Jacinto Benavente – Ha llegado Don Juan
- Alice Childress – Gold Through the Trees
- Agatha Christie – The Mousetrap
- John Clements – The Happy Marriage
- Noël Coward – Quadrille
- Constance Cox – Lord Arthur Savile's Crime
- Robertson Davies – A Masque of Aesop
- Henry de Montherlant – La Ville dont le prince est un enfant (The City Whose Prince is a Child; first performance in first published version)
- Friedrich Dürrenmatt – The Marriage of Mr. Mississippi (Die Ehe des Herrn Mississippi, first performance)
- Janet Green – Murder Mistaken
- Michael Clayton Hutton – Dead Secret
- Peter Jones – Sweet Madness
- Joseph Kramm – The Shrike
- Charles Langbridge Morgan – The River Line
- Eric Linklater – The Mortimer Touch
- Roger MacDougall – Escapade
- Raymond Massey – Hanging Judge
- Charles Morgan – The River Line
- Ralph Peterson – The Square Ring
- J. B. Priestley and Jacquetta Hawkes – Dragon's Mouth
- Terence Rattigan – The Deep Blue Sea
- Dodie Smith – Letter from Paris
- Ben Travers – Wild Horses
- Gerald Verner – Meet Mr. Callaghan
- John Van Druten – I've Got Sixpence

== 1953 ==
- Arthur Adamov – Professor Taranne (Le Professeur Taranne)
- Robert Anderson – Tea and Sympathy
- Alex Atkinson – Four Winds
- Samuel Beckett – Waiting for Godot (En attendant Godot)
- Mary Hayley Bell – The Uninvited Guest
- Ugo Betti – The Fugitive (La Fuggitiva, premiered posthumously)
- Peter Blackmore – Down Came a Blackbird
- Wynyard Browne – A Question of Fact
- Agatha Christie – Witness for the Prosecution
- Campbell Christie and Dorothy Christie – Carrington V.C.
- R. F. Delderfield – The Orchard Walls
- Max Frisch – The Fire Raisers (Biedermann und die Brandstifter, originally for radio)
- Witold Gombrowicz – The Marriage (Ślub, Polish version published)
- Kenneth Horne – Trial and Error
- N. C. Hunter – A Day by the Sea
- William Inge - Picnic
- Arthur Miller – The Crucible
- Hugh Mills – Angels in Love
- Erwin Strittmatter – Katzgraben
- Vernon Sylvaine – As Long as They're Happy

== 1954 ==
- Tawfiq al-Hakim – El Aydi El Na'mah (Soft Hands)
- Brendan Behan – The Quare Fellow
- Dharamvir Bharati – Andha Yug (The Blind Age)
- William Douglas Home – The Manor of Northstead
- Peter Jones – The Party Spirit
- Saunders Lewis – Siwan
- Ronald Millar – Waiting for Gillian
- Hugh Mills – The Little Glass Clock
- Terence Rattigan – Separate Tables
- Reginald Rose – Twelve Angry Men (original version as live teleplay)
- Dylan Thomas – Under Milk Wood (radio play)
- Thornton Wilder – The Matchmaker
- Herman Wouk – The Caine Mutiny Court-Martial

== 1955 ==
- Arthur Adamov – Le Ping-Pong
- Enid Bagnold – The Chalk Garden
- Samuel Beckett – Waiting for Godot (English version)
- Bertolt Brecht – Trumpets and Drums (Pauken und Trompeten; adaptation of Farquhar's The Recruiting Officer, 1706)
- João Cabral de Melo Neto – Morte e Vida Severina (Severine Life and Death, verse)
- Alice Childress – Trouble in Mind
- John Dighton – Man Alive!
- Sonnie Hale – The French Mistress
- William Inge – Bus Stop
- Eugène Ionesco
  - Jack, or The Submission (Jacques ou la soumission)
  - The New Tenant (Le Nouveau locataire)
- Ray Lawler – Summer of the Seventeenth Doll
- Jerome Lawrence and Robert Edwin Lee – Inherit the Wind
- Philip Mackie – The Whole Truth
- Arthur Miller
  - A View from the Bridge (one-act verse version)
  - A Memory of Two Mondays
- J. B. Priestley – Mr. Kettle and Mrs. Moon
- Reginald Rose – Twelve Angry Men (stage version)
- Jean-Paul Sartre – Nekrassov
- Ariano Suassuna – O Auto da Compadecida (The Compassionate Self)
- Orson Welles – Moby Dick—Rehearsed
- Thornton Wilder
  - The Matchmaker
  - A Life in the Sun
- Tennessee Williams – Cat on a Hot Tin Roof
- Carl Zuckmayer – The Cold Light (Das kalte Licht)

== 1956 ==
- Jean Anouilh – Pauvre Bitos, ou Le dîner de têtes (Poor Bitos)
- Ferdinand Bruckner – The Fight with the Angel (Der Kampf mit dem Engel)
- José Manuel Castañón – Moletú-Volevá
- Agatha Christie and Gerald Verner – Towards Zero
- Noël Coward – Nude with Violin
- Friedrich Dürrenmatt – The Visit (Der Besuch der alten Dame)
- Max Frisch – Philipp Hotz's Fury (Die Grosse Wut des Philipp Hotz)
- Anna Langfus – Les Lepreux (The Lepers, first performed)
- Hugh Leonard – The Birthday Party
- Saunders Lewis – Siwan
- Bruce Mason – The Pohutukawa Tree
- Ronald Millar – The Bride and the Bachelor
- Arthur Miller – A View from the Bridge (revised version)
- Hugh Mills – The House by the Lake
- Yukio Mishima – Rokumeikan
- Heiner Müller and Inge Müller – Der Lohndrücker (The Scab, written)
- Eugene O'Neill – Long Day's Journey into Night
- John Osborne – Look Back in Anger
- Arnold Wesker – Chicken Soup with Barley (written)

== 1957 ==
- Samuel Beckett – Endgame and Act Without Words I (first performed); All That Fall and From an Abandoned Work (first broadcast of both)
- Emilio Carballido – El censo
- William Douglas Home – The Iron Duchess
- Christopher Fry – The Dark is Light Enough
- Jean Genet – The Balcony (Le Balcon)
- Günter Grass – Flood (Hochwasser)
- Graham Greene – The Potting Shed
- Michael Clayton Hutton – Silver Wedding
- William Inge – The Dark at the Top of the Stairs
- Errol John – Moon on a Rainbow Shawl
- Bernard Kops – The Hamlet of Stepney Green
- John Osborne
  - The Entertainer
  - Epitaph for George Dillon
- Harold Pinter – The Dumb Waiter (written)
- N. F. Simpson – A Resounding Tinkle
- Wole Soyinka – The Invention
- Boris Vian – Les Bâtisseurs d'Empire (The Empire Builders)
- Tennessee Williams
  - Baby Doll
  - Orpheus Descending

== 1958 ==
- Samuel Beckett – Krapp's Last Tape
- Brendan Behan – The Hostage
- Bertolt Brecht – The Resistible Rise of Arturo Ui (Der aufhaltsame Aufstieg des Arturo Ui, written 1941, first performed)
- Clemence Dane – Eighty in the Shade
- Refik Erduran – Bir Kilo Namus (One Kilo Honesty)
- Max Frisch – The Fire Raisers (Biedermann und die Brandstifter, first stage adaptation)
- Jean Genet – The Blacks: A Clown Show (Les Nègres, clownerie, first published)
- Kenneth Horne – Wolf's Clothing
- N. C. Hunter – A Touch of the Sun
- Ann Jellicoe – The Sport of My Mad Mother
- Ronald Millar – The Big Tickle
- Sławomir Mrożek – The Police (Policja)
- Heiner Müller and Inge Müller
  - Die Korrektur (The Correction)
  - Der Lohndrücker (The Scab, first performed)
- Mohan Rakesh – Ashadh Ka Ek Din (आषाढ़ का एक दिन, One Day in Ashadh)
- Barry Reckord – Flesh to a Tiger
- Elmer Rice – Cue for Passion
- Peter Shaffer – Five Finger Exercise
- N. F. Simpson – The Hole
- Wole Soyinka – The Swamp Dwellers
- Derek Walcott – Drums and Colours
- Arthur Watkyn – Not in the Book
- Arnold Wesker – Chicken Soup with Barley (first performed)
- Tennessee Williams – Suddenly, Last Summer

== 1959 ==
- Edward Albee
  - The Death of Bessie Smith (written)
  - The Zoo Story (premiered in German)
- Jean Anouilh – Becket
- John Arden – Serjeant Musgrave's Dance
- Alan Ayckbourn (as Roland Allen) – The Square Cat
- Samuel Beckett – Embers (first broadcast)
- Bertolt Brecht (died 1956) – Saint Joan of the Stockyards (Die Heilige Johanna der Schlachthöfe, first stage performance)
- Albert Camus – The Possessed (Les Possédés)
- Beverley Cross – One More River
- William Douglas Home – Aunt Edwina
- Refik Erduran – Cengiz Han’ın Bisikleti (The Bicycle of Genghis Khan)
- Jack Gelber – The Connection
- Jean Genet – The Blacks: A Clown Show (Les Nègres, clownerie, first performed)
- Lorraine Hansberry – A Raisin in the Sun
- Eugène Ionesco – The Killer (Tueur sans gages)
- Geoffrey Lumsden – Caught Napping
- Harold Pinter – The Caretaker (first published)
- Zofia Posmysz – Pasażerka z kabiny 45 (Passenger from Cabin 45, radio drama)
- Jean-Paul Sartre – The Condemned of Altona (Les Séquestrés d'Altona, translated as Loser Wins)
- N. F. Simpson – One Way Pendulum
- Wole Soyinka – The Lion and the Jewel
- Arnold Wesker
  - Roots
  - The Kitchen
- Tennessee Williams – Sweet Bird of Youth
- Egon Wolff – Parejas de trapo

== 1960 ==
- Edward Albee – The Death of Bessie Smith and The Sandbox (first performances)
- Samuel Beckett – The Old Tune (first broadcast)
- Robert Bolt – A Man for All Seasons (stage version) and The Tiger and the Horse
- Marc Camoletti – Boeing-Boeing
- Henry Cecil and William Saroyan – Settled Out of Court
- Agatha Christie – Go Back for Murder
- Noël Coward – Waiting in the Wings
- Beverley Cross – Strip the Willow
- Witold Gombrowicz – The Marriage (Ślub, first performance)
- Eugène Ionesco – Rhinocéros
- Ira Levin – Critic's Choice
- Stephen Lewis and Theatre Workshop – Sparrers Can't Sing
- Bruce Mason – The End of the Golden Weather
- Tad Mosel – All the Way Home
- Harold Pinter
  - The Caretaker (first performed and published)
  - The Room (first professional performance)
  - A Night Out (first broadcast)
- Terence Rattigan – Ross
- Barry Reckord – You in Your Small Corner
- Nelson Rodrigues – Beijo no Asfalto (The Asphalt Kiss)
- Wole Soyinka – A Dance of the Forests
- Gore Vidal – The Best Man
- Maruxa Vilalta – Los disorientados (The Disoriented Ones)
- Keith Waterhouse and Willis Hall – Billy Liar
- Orson Welles (adaptation) – Chimes at Midnight
- Tennessee Williams – Period of Adjustment
