= The Flowering Peach =

1954 dramatic play by Clifford Odets

- Original language: English
- Written by: Clifford Odets
- Genre: Drama

Premiere
- Date: December 28, 1954

The Flowering Peach is a 1954 dramatic play by American playwright Clifford Odets with music by Alan Hovhaness. The plot is a modern take on the Bible stories of Noah and Noah's Ark.

It was the last original play by Odets produced in his lifetime. The play was revived in 1994. While rarely produced in stock and regional theatres, a musical version titled Two by Two was produced on Broadway in 1970 by Richard Rodgers, Martin Charnin and Peter Stone. It starred Danny Kaye and ran for a year on Broadway.

== See also ==
- Timeline of twentieth-century theatre
- Twentieth-century theatre
