= Frank Jeans =

British physician

Frank Alexander Gallon Jeans FRCS (15 June 1878 – 21 June 1933) was a British urologist.

== Early life ==
Frank Jeans was born in Liverpool on 15 June 1878, the son of Sir Alexander Grigor Jeans, managing editor of the Liverpool Post and Mercury, and his wife Ellen Gallon. He was educated at Birkenhead School, St John's College, Cambridge, King's College Hospital and St Bartholomew's Hospital.

His younger brother was the playwright Ronald Jeans (1887–1973).

== Career ==
Jeans became a lecturer on clinical surgery at the University of Liverpool, president of the urological section of the Royal Society of Medicine in 1929, and a vice-president of the Liverpool Medical Institution.

== Personal life ==
In 1907, he married in 1907 Eveline Barry (died 1928), the daughter of Garrett James Barry, and they had a son and a daughter. He died in Harrogate on 21 June 1933.
