= Douglas Jefferies =

British actor (1884–1959)

- 1939 Spotlight photo
- Born: 21 April 1884; Islington, England, United Kingdom
- Died: December 1959; England, United Kingdom
- Occupation: Actor
- Years active: 1931-1953 (film & TV)

Douglas Jefferies (1884–1959) was a British stage and film actor.

== Selected filmography ==
- A Safe Affair (1931) - Henry
- Channel Crossing (1933) - Dr. Walkley
- What Happened to Harkness? (1934) - (uncredited)
- The Cardinal (1936) - Baglioni
- While the Sun Shines (1947) - The Duke of Ayr and Stirling
- The Loves of Joanna Godden (1947) - Huggett
- Frieda (1947) - Hobson
- The Long Dark Hall (1951) - Dr. Conway

== Selected stage roles ==
- Lean Harvest by Ronald Jeans (1931)
- Victoria Regina by Laurence Housman (1937)
- While the Sun Shines by Terence Rattigan (1943)
- Home Is Tomorrow by J.B. Priestley (1948)
- Cry Liberty by Esther McCracken (1950)
- The Seventh Veil by Sydney Box (1951)

== Bibliography ==
- Christopher Murray. Sean O'Casey: Writer at Work, a Biography. Gill & Macmillan, 2004.
