= All That Matters =

All That Matters may refer to:

== Music ==
- All That Matters (Portrait album), 1995
- All That Matters (Michael Bolton album), 1997
- "All That Matters" (ABC song), 1991
- "All That Matters" (Cliff Richard song), 1997
- "All That Matters" (Louise song), 1998
- All That Matters, a song on Mark Knopfler's album Shangri-La (2004) and collaboration with Emmylou Harris, Real Live Roadrunning (2006)
- "All That Matters", a song on Addison Road's self-titled album, 2008
- "All That Matters (The Beautiful Life)", a 2012 song by Kesha
- "All That Matters" (Justin Bieber song), 2013
- "All That Matters" (Estelle song), 2015
- "All That Matters", a song on Colton Dixon's album Identity, 2017

== Other uses ==
- All That Matters, a series of books published by Teach Yourself
- All That Matters (play), a 1911 British play by Charles McEvoy
- All That Matters Is Past, in Norwegian Uskyld, 2012 Norwegian drama film directed by Sara Johnsen
- All That Matters (novel), a 2004 novel by Wayson Choy
