= Turki Hur =

Turki Hur is an Urdu play by Agha Hashar Kashmiri. It was published in 1922. It was adapted into an Indian silent film, Turki Hoor, in 1928 by J. J. Madan.
