= Emilio Carballido =

Mexican writer and playwright

Emilio Carballido (Córdoba, Veracruz, 22 May 1925 – Xalapa, Veracruz, 11 February 2008) was a Mexican writer who earned particular renown as a playwright.

Carballido belonged to the group of writers known as the Generación de los 50, alongside such figures as Sergio Magaña, Luisa Josefina Hernández, Rosario Castellanos, Jaime Sabines, and Sergio Galindo. He studied English literature and earned a master's degree in literature from the National Autonomous University of Mexico (UNAM).

As a playwright his first work was Rosalba y los Llaveros, which premiered at Palacio de Bellas Artes in 1950, directed by well-known poet and stage director Salvador Novo. This was followed by a huge number of plays, including Un pequeño día de ira (1961), which earned him the Casa de las Américas Prize, ¡Silencio Pollos pelones, ya les van a echar su maíz! (1963), Te juro Juana que tengo ganas (1965), Yo también hablo de la rosa (1965), Acapulco los lunes (1969), Las cartas de Mozart (1974), and the box office hit Rosa de dos aromas (1986).

Some of his works as a playwright were filmed for the screen, such as Rosalba y los llaveros (1954), Felicidad (1956), La danza que sueña la tortuga (1975), El censo (1977), Orinoco (1984), and Rosa de dos aromas (1989). In addition to more than a hundred plays and scripts, he also wrote two volumes of short stories and nine novels, and worked randomly as a stage director.

His career in the Mexican film industry began with the script for La torre de marfil, written in collaboration with Luisa Josefina Hernández in 1957. In 1972 he received two Ariels for the storyline and script of Alfonso Arau's El Águila Descalza. On 27 May 2002 he was given the Ariel de Oro for his lifetime achievements which include more than 50 films, remarkably his collaboration in Luis Buñuel's Nazarín (1959).

In 1996, he was awarded the National Prize for Arts, the highest honor bestowed upon artists by the Mexican government, in the Linguistics and Literature category.

== Personal life ==
On 16 March 2007, Carballido and his partner of 20 years, Héctor Herrera, were among the first couples to apply for a civil union following the enactment of the Federal District's 2006 Ley de Sociedad de Convivencia.

Carballido died of a heart attack on 11 February 2008 in Xalapa. Two days later, Governor of Veracruz Fidel Herrera Beltrán ordered a day of mourning in the state and announced that the Theatre of the State and one of the state literary prizes would be renamed after him.
