= Alexander Jeans =

British newspaper editor and proprietor

Sir Alexander Grigor Jeans (1849–1924) was a British newspaper editor and proprietor, the founder and managing editor of the Liverpool Post and Mercury.

He married Ellen Gallon (d. 1889). They had children:

- Allan Jeans, editor of the Liverpool Daily Post
- Frank Alexander Gallon Jeans (1878–1933), surgeon and author
- Ronald Jeans (1887–1973), playwright with a career spanning nearly 50 years
