= Asir-e-Hirs =

Asir-e-Hirs is an Urdu play by Agha Hashar Kashmiri. It was published in 1900.
