= The Seventh Veil (play) =

1951 play

- Original language: English
- Written by: Muriel Box; Sydney Box
- Genre: Melodrama
- Setting: London, Venice, over a period of 12 years

Premiere
- Date: 12 February 1951
- Place: Theatre Royal, Brighton

The Seventh Veil is a 1951 play by Muriel Box and Sydney Box, based on the hit 1945 film of the same title that they had produced.

It premiered at the Theatre Royal, Brighton before transferring to the Prince's Theatre in London's West End where it ran for 68 performances between 14 March and 12 June 1951. The cast included Ann Todd, Herbert Lom, Leo Genn, Ralph Michael, Douglas Jefferies, Derek Blomfield, Dino Galvani and Daphne Anderson. It marked Lom's West End debut.

== Bibliography ==
- Spicer, Andrew. British Film Makers: Sydney Box. Manchester University Press, 2006.
- Wearing, J.P. The London Stage 1950-1959: A Calendar of Productions, Performers, and Personnel. Rowman & Littlefield, 2014.
