= Constance Cox =

British script writer

- Born: 25 October 1912; Sutton, Surrey, England
- Died: 8 July 1998 (aged 85)
- Occupations: Scriptwriter, playwright

Constance Cox (25 October 1912 – 8 July 1998) was a British script writer and playwright, born in Sutton, Surrey.

== Life and career ==
Cox was born Constance Shaw in Sutton, Surrey, in 1912. She married Norman Cox, a fighter pilot, who was killed in 1942. She had been a postmistress in Shoreham-by-sea, and moved to Brighton where she took up writing full-time after the end of the war.

Cox specialised in adaptations of books by Charles Dickens and other classic literature. Her 1962 adaptation of Charles Dickens' Oliver Twist led to viewer complaints over the murder of Nancy by Bill Sikes and questions asked in Parliament about the suitability of such content for family audiences.

In 1957 she adapted the J.B. Priestley novel Angel Pavement into a BBC series of the same title. She also was a prolific playwright. She was a member of the Brighton Little Theatre from the early 1950s and directed her own and others' work there for many years.

== Selected works and adaptations ==
- The Romance of David Garrick (1942)
- Vanity Fair (1946)
- The Picture of Dorian Gray: A Play in Two Acts Adapted from Oscar Wilde's Novel (1948) (The Fortune Press)
- The Count of Monte Cristo (1950) (The Fortune Press)
- Northanger Abbey : a comedy in three acts, based upon Jane Austen's novel (1950) (The Fortune Press)
- Spring at Marino: A comedy in three acts; suggested by Turgenev's Fathers and son (1951) (Samuel French Ltd)
- Lord Arthur Savile's Crime (1952)
- Three Knaves of Normandy: Play (1958) (Evans Bros.)
- Jane Eyre: Play (1959) based on the novel by Charlotte Brontë (J Garnet Miller Ltd) ISBN 0-85343-110-8
- Bleak House: BBC television adaptation (1959)
- Caliph's Minstrel: Play (1961) (Evans Bros.) ISBN 0-237-49282-2
- Oliver Twist: BBC television adaptation (1962)
- Lord Arthur Savile's Crime: A comedy in three acts (Acting Edition S.) (1963) (from Oscar Wilde's short story) (Samuel French Ltd) ISBN 0-573-01245-8
- Miniature Beggar's Opera: Play (1964) (Evans Bros) ISBN 0-237-49283-0
- Everyman: A new version of the morality play (Acting Edition S.) (1967) (Samuel French Ltd) ISBN 0-573-06248-X
- Christmas Carol (1968) (Evans Bros.) ISBN 0-237-49495-7
- Maria Marten or Murder in the Red Barn: A Melodrama (1969) (Samuel French Ltd) ISBN 0-573-02325-5
- Miss Letitia (Acting Edition S.) (1970) (Samuel French Ltd) ISBN 0-573-01275-X
- Maria Marten (Acting Edition S.) (1970) (Samuel French Ltd) ISBN 0-573-02325-5
- Pride and Prejudice: Play (1972) (J Garnet Miller Ltd) ISBN 0-85343-528-6
- Murder Game (Acting Edition S.) (1976) (Samuel French Ltd) ISBN 0-573-01222-9
- Lady Audley's Secret (Acting Edition S.) (1976) (Samuel French Ltd) ISBN 0-573-02345-X
- Vampire, or the Bride of Death (1978) (Samuel French Ltd) ISBN 0-573-12293-8
- What Brutes Men Are: A Comedy (1980) (Samuel French Ltd) ISBN 0-573-13337-8
- Micah Clarke (1985)
- A Time for Loving (Acting Edition S.) (1986) (Samuel French Ltd) ISBN 0-573-11417-X
- Because of the Lockwoods: Play (Acting Edition S.) Constance Cox and Dorothy Whipple (1991) (Samuel French Ltd) ISBN 0-573-01722-0
- Return of the Church to an East Anglian Parish (1996) (Honeyhill Studio) ISBN 0-9529942-0-8
- Wuthering Heights (1997) (New Theatre Publications) ISBN 1-84094-002-6
- Mansfield Park Jane Austen and Constance Cox (1997) (Hub Publications) ISBN 0-905049-15-2
- The Woman in White: Play (French's Acting Editions S.) (2005) (Samuel French Ltd) ISBN 0-573-11578-8
