= Laughter in Court =

1936 play

- Written by: Hugh Mills
- Original language: English
- Genre: Comedy

Premiere
- Date premiered: 17 August 1936
- Place premiered: Grand Theatre, Blackpool

Laughter in Court is a 1936 comedy play by the British writer Hugh Mills. It premiered at the Grand Theatre, Blackpool before transferring to the Shaftesbury Theatre in London's West End where it ran for 117 performances. The West End cast included Yvonne Arnaud, Ronald Squire, Evelyn Roberts, Edmund Breon and Wilfrid Caithness. It was one of a number of plays of the era with courtroom settings.

== Bibliography ==
- Kabatchnik, Amnon. Blood on the Stage, 1925-1950: Milestone Plays of Crime, Mystery, and Detection : an Annotated Repertoire. Scarecrow Press, 2010.
- Wearing, J.P. The London Stage 1930-1939: A Calendar of Productions, Performers, and Personnel. Rowman & Littlefield, 2014.
