= Twentieth-century theatre =

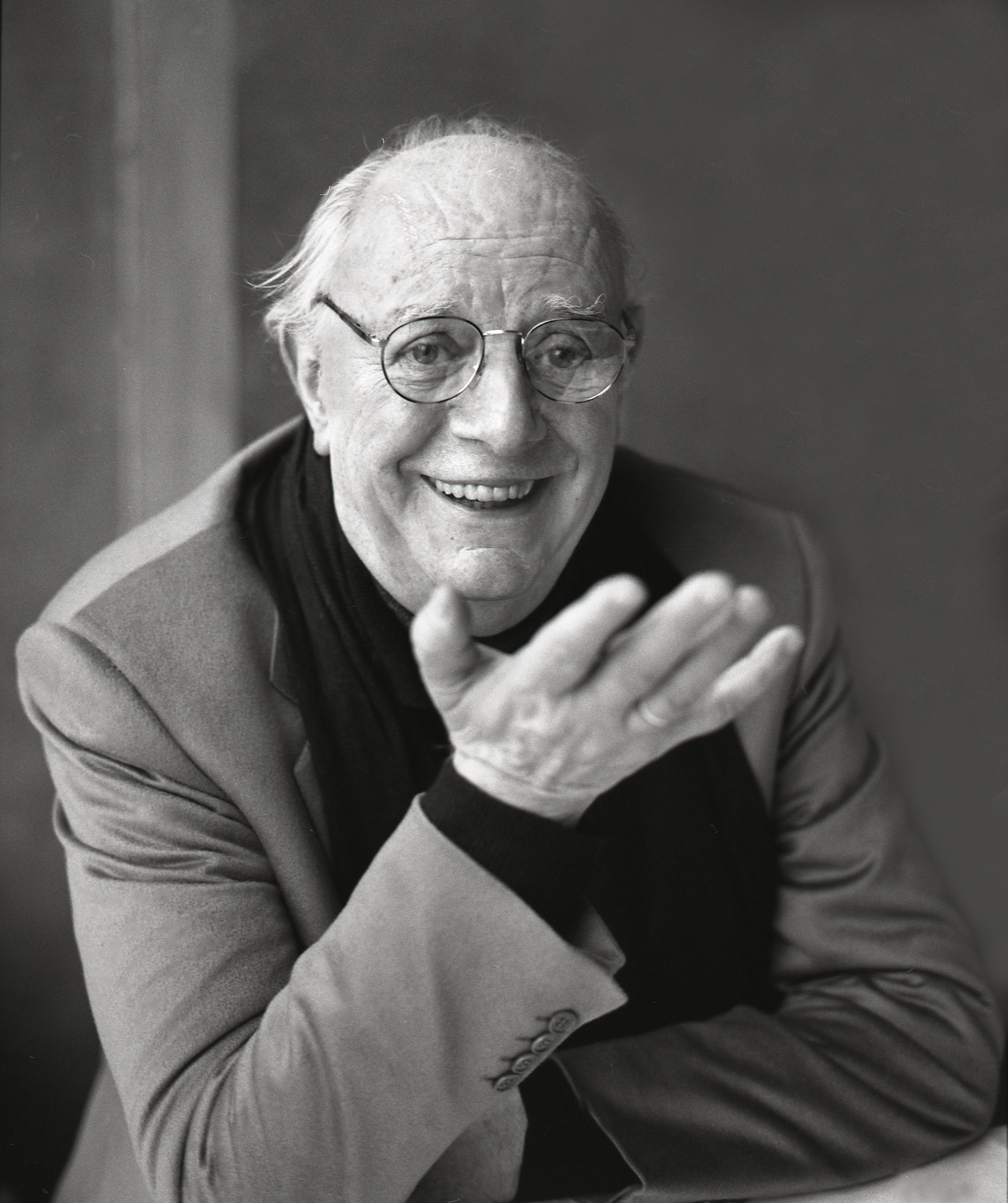
Dario Fo, one of the most widely performed playwrights in modern theatre, received international acclaim for his highly improvisational style. He was awarded the Nobel Prize for Literature in 1997.

Twentieth-century theatre describes a period of great change within the theatrical culture of the 20th century, mainly in Europe and North America. There was a widespread challenge to long-established rules surrounding theatrical representation; resulting in the development of many new forms of theatre, including modernism, expressionism, impressionism, political theatre and other forms of Experimental theatre, as well as the continuing development of already established theatrical forms like naturalism and realism.

Throughout the century, the artistic reputation of theatre improved after being derided throughout the 19th century. However, the growth of other media, especially film, has resulted in a diminished role within the culture at large. In light of this change, theatrical artists have been forced to seek new ways to engage with society. The various answers offered in response to this have prompted the transformations that make up its modern history.

Developments in areas like gender theory and postmodern philosophy identified and created subjects for the theatre to explore. These sometimes explicitly meta-theatrical performances were meant to confront the audience's perceptions and assumptions to raise questions about their society. These challenging and influential plays characterized much of the final two decades of the 20th century.

Although largely developing in Europe and North America through the beginning of the century, the next 50 years saw an embrace of non-Western theatrical forms. Influenced by the dismantling of empires and the continuing development of post-colonial theory, many new artists used elements of their own cultures and societies to create a diversified theatre.

== Realism ==
Realism focuses on the attempt to represent subject matter truthfully, without artificiality and avoiding artistic conventions or implausible, exotic and supernatural elements. For many theatre artists throughout the century, realism was meant to direct attention to the social and psychological problems of ordinary life.

Influenced by the ideas of Sigmund Freud, Charles Darwin and others, many artists began to find a psychological approach to theatre that emphasized the inner dimensions of the characters onstage. This was carried out both on the stage in acting styles, in play writing and in theatrical design. Beginning with the work Russian playwrights Ivan Turgenev, Alexander Ostrovsky and Leo Tolstoy and continued by Emile Zola in France and Henrik Ibsen in Norway in the late 19th century, realism came to dominate most of the theatrical culture of the 20th century in Britain and North America.

=== Russia ===
In Russia, the movement towards realism began earlier than anywhere else in the world. Building on the work of earlier pioneers, Constantin Stanislavski and Vladimir Nemirovich-Danchenko founded the Moscow Art Theatre in 1898, wanting to reform a Russian theatre dominated by melodrama to one in which high-quality art was available to the general public. In perhaps the most important theatrical meeting of the 20th century, the two met for an epic 18-hours, from 2 pm to 8 am the next morning, and laid the foundation for one of the most influential companies of the century. Together they would forge a professional company with an ensemble ethos that discouraged individual vanity, selecting actors from Nemirovich's class at the Philharmonic school and Stanislavsky's amateur Society of Art and Literature group, along with other professional actors; they would create a realistic theatre of international renown, with popular prices for seats, whose organically unified aesthetic would bring together the techniques of the Meiningen Ensemble and those of André Antoine's Théâtre Libre (which Stanislavsky had seen during trips to Paris).

On 29 December 1898, the theatre opened Anton Chekhov's The Seagull with Stanislavski himself playing the role of Trigorin and Vsevolod Meyerhold as Treplev in "one of the greatest events in the history of Russian theatre and one of the greatest developments in the history of world drama." Nemirovich described the applause, which came after a prolonged silence, as bursting from the audience like a dam breaking and the production received unanimous praise from the press. Later analysts attribute the production's success to the fidelity of its delicate representation of everyday life, its intimate, ensemble playing, and the resonance of its mood of despondent uncertainty with the psychological disposition of the Russian intelligentsia of the time. Productions of Ibsen, Shakespeare, and Chekhov's Uncle Vanya, The Cherry Orchard and Three Sisters were also very successful in the early days of the company.

After the success of the Moscow Art Theatre, Stanislavski set out to create a unified system of acting that would train actors and actresses to create believable characterizations for their performances. Developed mainly between 1911 and 1916 and revised throughout his life, the approach was partly based on the concept of emotional memory for which an actor focuses internally to portray a character's emotions onstage. Areas of study include concentration, voice, physical skills, emotion memory, observation, and dramatic analysis. The Stanislavsky system was widely practiced in the Soviet Union and in the United States, where experiments in its use began in the 1920s and continued in many schools and professional workshops.

In the early part of the 20th century, Russia experienced a cultural Silver Age and the theatre was no exception. By 1916, the total number of producing theatres in Moscow alone totaled close to 200. These year-round and seasonal theatres produced mainly farces, comedies, vaudevilles and even melodramas, but there were also a significant number of theatres offering realistic or naturalistic theatre. These included Aleksey Suvorin's Maly Theatre and the Moscow Dramatic Theatre (1914–19). While there were a number of actress-managers in St. Petersburg and Moscow like Vera Komissarzhevskaya and Ida Rubinstein, the course of Russian theatre in the Silver Age was largely dominated by men.

After the First World War and the Russian Revolution, many theatre artists left Russia for other countries, including Georges Pitoëff to France, Theodore Komisarjevsky to Britain, and, famously, Mikhael Chekhov to the United States, exporting the Stanislavski system and contributing to the development of a 'director's theatre' in the post-war world.

=== United States ===
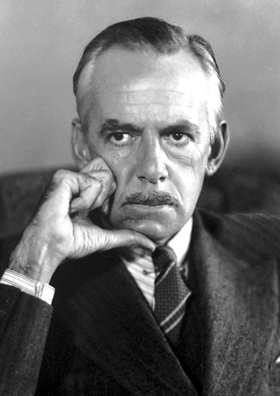
Eugene O'Neill had a huge influence on the development of modern American drama.

In the United States, William Vaughn Moody's plays The Great Divide (1906) and The Faith Healer (1909) pointed the way to a more realistic American drama in their emphasis on the emotional conflicts that lie at the heart of contemporary social conflicts. Other key playwrights signaling the move to realism in the beginning of the century include Edward Sheldon, Charles Rann Kennedy and Rachel Crothers. Onstage, the American theatre was dominated by the Barrymore family: Lionel Barrymore, Ethel Barrymore (the "First Lady of American Theater") and John Barrymore ("... the most influential and idolized actor of his day."). They were so popular that a play was even written about them: The Royal Family by George S. Kaufman and Edna Ferber, a parody of the Barrymores, with particular aim taken at John and Ethel Barrymore.

Through the early century, no American dramatist had as much influence on the development of drama as Eugene O'Neill. Born into the theatre from a young age, he spent much of his youth on trains and backstage at theatres, before developing his talent with the Provincetown Players in New York City. Between 1916 and 1920, he wrote several plays for the company before debuting his first critical hit Beyond the Horizon in 1920, which went on to win the Pulitzer Prize for Drama. He followed that with critical and commercial successes, including The Emperor Jones, Anna Christie (Pulitzer Prize 1922), Desire Under the Elms (1924), Strange Interlude (Pulitzer Prize 1928), Mourning Becomes Electra (1931), The Iceman Cometh (1939) and his only well-known comedy, Ah, Wilderness!. After his death, his magnum opus and masterwork Long Day's Journey into Night was published and is often regarded to be one of the finest American plays of the 20th century.

The economic crisis of the Great Depression led to the creation of the Federal Theatre Project (1935–39), a New Deal program which funded theatre and other live artistic performances throughout the country. National director Hallie Flanagan shaped the project into a federation of regional theatres that created relevant art, encouraged experimentation and made it possible for millions of Americans to see theatre for the first time. The project directly employed 15,000 men and women and played 1,200 productions to nearly 30 million people in 200 theatres nationwide, with 65% being presented free of charge, at a total cost of $46 million.

Key figures of the early century include George S. Kaufman, George Kelly, Langston Hughes, S. N. Behrman, Sidney Howard, Robert E. Sherwood, and a set of playwrights who followed O'Neill's path of philosophical searching, Philip Barry, Thornton Wilder and William Saroyan.

== Futurism ==
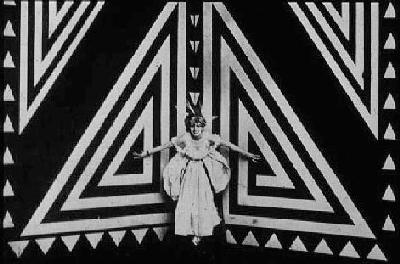
Thais by Anton Giulio Bragaglia with futurist scenographies by Enrico Prampolini

At the beginning of the century, the influences of the historical avant-gardes made themselves felt: Futurism, Dadaism and Surrealism. Especially futurism tried to change the idea of modern Italian theatre by adapting it to new ideas. Filippo Tommaso Marinetti took an interest in writing the various Futurist Manifests on his new idea of theatre. Together with Bruno Corra he created what was called synthetic theatre. Later the Futurists formed a company, directed by Rodolfo De Angelis, which was called the Teatro della sorpresa. The presence of a scenographer like Enrico Prampolini shifted the attention more to the very modern scenographies than to the often disappointing acting. Another character who attended the theatre in this period, without notable success compared to other literary and poetic productions, was Gabriele D'Annunzio. Of him there are some tragedies of a classical context, close to the Liberty style characteristic of the whole production of the warrior-poet.

== Modernism ==
Modernism was a predominantly European movement that developed as a self-conscious break from traditional art forms. It represents a significant shift in cultural sensibilities, often attributed to the fallout of World War I. At first, the modernist theatre was in large part an attempt to realize the reformed stage on naturalistic principles as advocated by Émile Zola in the 1880s. However, a simultaneous reaction against naturalism urged the theatre in a much different direction. Owing much to symbolism, the movement attempted to integrate poetry, painting, music, and dance in a harmonious fusion. Both of these seemingly conflicting movements fit under the term 'Modernism'.

== Political theatre ==
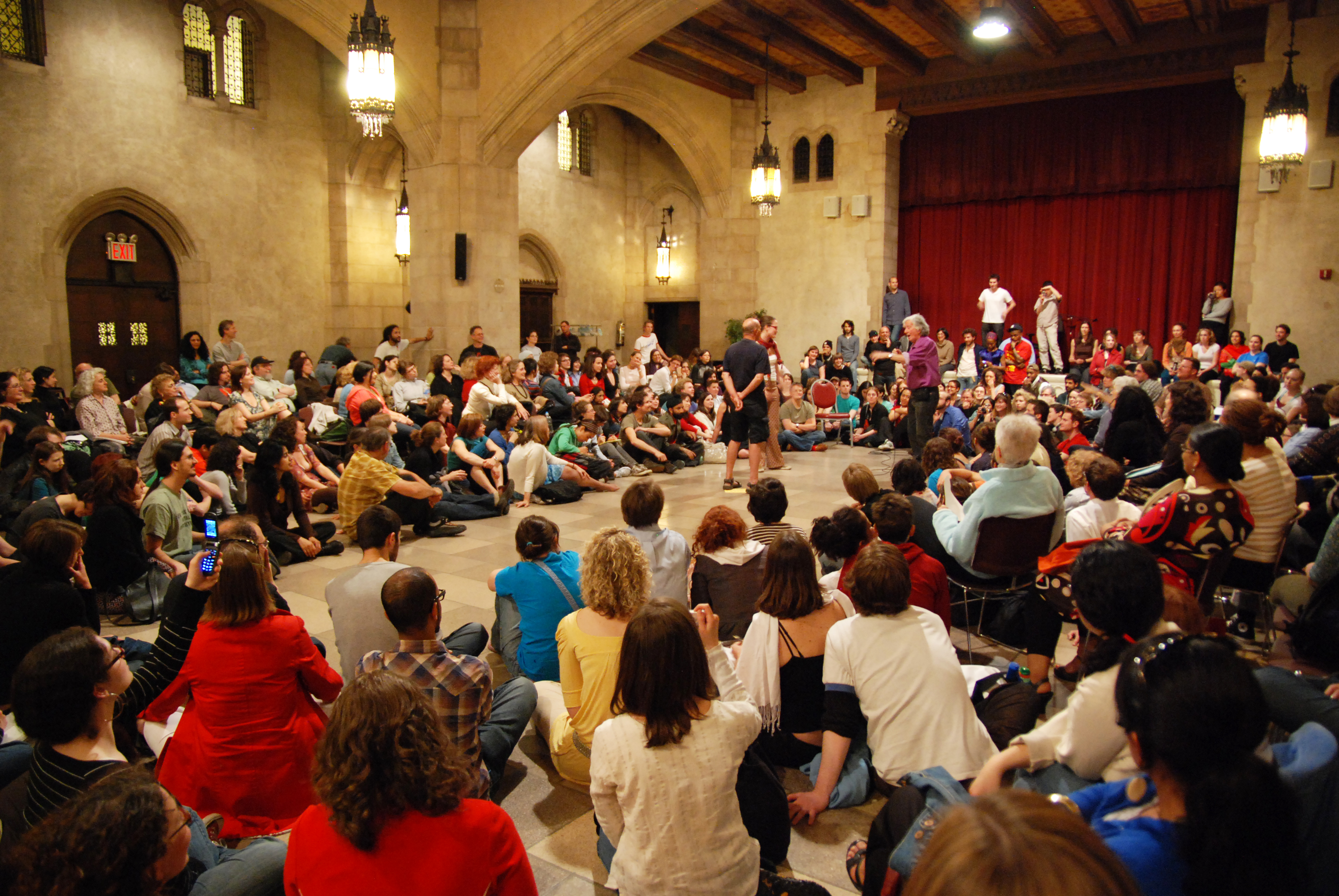
A workshop of Augusto Boal's Theatre of the Oppressed in 2008.

Political theatre is an attempt to rethink the nature and function of theatre in the light of the dynamics of the society outside it and audience involvement within it. It led to profound and original theories of acting, staging and playwriting.

== Popular theatre ==
At the beginning of the 20th century, many viewed theatre as an "all-too-popular affair." Frequently, the true reformers of the early part of the century called for increasingly smaller theatres, where their techniques could register on a select audience. Still, these same practitioners often dreamed that their art would be a true people's theatre: a theatre for the people. Inspired by an understanding of the Greek theatre and heavily influenced by Nietzsche, they sought a profound or ecstatic ritual event that involved music and movement, in a space without a proscenium arch. Later, practitioners like Vsevolod Meyerhold and Bertolt Brecht would initiate an attempt to bridge the "gulf" between modernism and the people.

=== Musical theatre ===
In popular musical theatre there have been different trends and phases of commercial success, including works of the following:

- the great popularity of the British Edwardian musical comedies (1892–1917),
- the advent of the Princess Theatre musicals in New York (1913–1923),
- the emergence of American popular musical theatre, with the works of:
  - Jerome Kern (1885–1945); Princess Theatre musicals, Ziegfeld Follies (1916, 1917), Show Boat (1927)
  - George Gershwin (1898–1937) and Ira Gershwin (1896–1983) Rhapsody in Blue (1924), An American in Paris (1928), Porgy and Bess (1935).
  - Cole Porter (1891–1964); Paris (1928), Wake Up and Dream (1929), Anything Goes (1934)
  - Rodgers and Hart; Richard Rodgers (1902–1979) and Lorenz Hart (1895–1943) Babes in Arms (1937), Pal Joey (1940)
  - Rodgers and Hammerstein; Richard Rodgers (1902–1979) and Oscar Hammerstein II (1895–1960):Oklahoma! (1943), Carousel (1945), South Pacific (1949), The King and I (1951) and The Sound of Music (1959).
- In the second half of the 20th century, new creative talents emerged and attracted large audiences, including:
  - Stephen Sondheim (1930–2021); West Side Story (1957) (lyrics), A Funny Thing Happened on the Way to the Forum (1962), A Little Night Music (1973), Sweeney Todd (1979), Into the Woods (1987).
  - Andrew Lloyd Webber (1948--); Evita (1978), Cats (1981), The Phantom of the Opera (1986)
  - Claude-Michel Schönberg (1944--) and Alain Boublil (1941--); Les Misérables (musical) (1980), and Miss Saigon (1989)

== Post-modern theatre ==
Post-modern theatre is a recent phenomenon in world theatre, coming as it does out of the postmodern philosophy that originated in Europe in the middle of the 20th century. Post-modern theatre emerged as a reaction against modernist theatre. Most post-modern productions are centered around highlighting the fallibility of definite truth, instead encouraging the audience to reach their own individual understanding. Essentially, thus, post-modern theatre raises questions rather than attempting to supply answers.

== Global theatre ==
At the beginning of the 20th century, many European audiences were exposed to the "exotic" theatrical world of Japanese and Chinese performances. This led to many Western practitioners interpreting and incorporating these styles into their own theatres: most notably Bertolt Brecht's adaptation of Chinese opera to support his 'Alienation' effect. The influence of the non-western theatre on theatrical culture in the 20th-century has often been crucial to new developments. However, the period during and after the advent of post-colonial theory in the 1960s and 1970s, has led to a tremendous amount of development in theatre practice all over the world. This has created, for the first time, a truly global theatre.

== Significant figures ==
Significant figures and some landmark theories and movements of the period include:

- Konstantin Stanislavski (1863–1938) and his system: a "naturalistic" method of drawing on the actor's own emotional memories to convey a character's thoughts and emotions
- Antonin Artaud (1896–1948) and the Theatre of Cruelty: a plan to force the audience to shed their illusions
- Bertolt Brecht (1898–1956) and Epic theatre: a reaction against Stanislavski's naturalistic method, Epic theatre makes clear that the audience is watching a play and an artifice
- Lee Strasberg (1901–1982) and Method acting: which trains actors to draw upon their own emotions and memories, to convincingly portray a part.
- Jerzy Grotowski (1933–1999), who introduced the concept of "poor theatre"
- Eugenio Barba, Grotowski's disciple and founder of the Odin Theatret, introducing the concepts of theatrical anthropology
- Samuel Beckett (1906–1989) and Theatre of the Absurd: in a modern world without meaning or purpose, a play's dialog, plot and characters give up the threads of "logic" or "message". (related to Existentialism)
- Hans-Thies Lehmann's theory of Postdramatic theatre: focused more on effect on the audience than on the original text.

=== Nobel laureates ===
During the twentieth-century the Nobel Prize in Literature was awarded to the following who were primarily dramatists:

- 1903 – Bjørnstjerne Bjørnson — Norwegian
- 1904 – José Echegaray — Spanish; El gran Galeoto
- 1910 – Paul Heyse — German
- 1911 – Maurice Maeterlinck — Belgian
- 1912 – Gerhart Hauptmann — German
- 1913 – Rabindranath Tagore — Indian
- 1915 – Romain Rolland — French
- 1922 – Jacinto Benavente — Spanish
- 1925 – George Bernard Shaw — Irish
- 1934 – Luigi Pirandello — Italian
- 1936 – Eugene O'Neill — American
- 1957 – Albert Camus — French
- 1964 – Jean-Paul Sartre — French
- 1969 – Samuel Beckett — Irish
- 1986 – Wole Soyinka — Nigerian
- 1997 – Dario Fo — Italian
- 2000 – Gao Xingjian — Chinese
- 2005 – Harold Pinter — British

== See also ==
- Timeline of twentieth-century theatre
- History of theatre
- Nineteenth-century theatre
- Avant-garde theatre

== Sources ==
- Benedetti, Jean. 1989. Stanislavski: An Introduction. Revised edition. Original edition published in 1982. London: Methuen. ISBN 0-413-50030-6.
- ---. 1991. The Moscow Art Theatre Letters. New York: Routledge.
- ---. 1999. Stanislavski: His Life and Art. Revised edition. Original edition published in 1988. London: Methuen. ISBN 0-413-52520-1.
- Braun, Edward. 1982. "Stanislavsky and Chekhov". The Director and the Stage: From Naturalism to Grotowski. London: Methuen. ISBN 0-413-46300-1. pp. 59–76.
- Esslin, Martin. Modern Theatre 1890 – 1920. In John Russell Brown. 1995. The Oxford Illustrated History of Theatre. Oxford: Oxford University Press. ISBN 0-19-212997-X.
- Golub, Spencer. 1999. "The Silver Age, 1905–1917." In Robert Leach and Victor Borovsky, eds. 1999. A History of Russian Theatre. Cambridge: Cambridge University Press.
- Rudnitsky, Konstantin. 1981. Meyerhold the Director. Trans. George Petrov. Ed. Sydney Schultze. Revised translation of Rezhisser Meierkhol'd. Moscow: Academy of Sciences, 1969. ISBN 0-88233-313-5.
