= Lean Harvest =

1931 play

- Written by: Ronald Jeans
- Original language: English
- Genre: Drama
- Setting: England, 1919-1927

Premiere
- Date premiered: 7 June 1931
- Place premiered: St Martin's Theatre, London

Lean Harvest is a 1931 play by the British writer Ronald Jeans. It portrays a married couple in the years after the First World War, with the New Statesman review concluding that the moral of the play was "too much money and too little money are equally dangerous to married happiness".

Its original run at St Martin's Theatre in London's West End ran for 123 performances between 7 June and 21 August 1931. It starred Leslie Banks, who also directed, as well as Diana Wynyard, Nigel Bruce, Douglas Jefferies, E. Vivian Reynolds, Joan Swinstead and Allan Wade. It was produced by Raymond Massey. It then transferred to the Forrest Theatre on Broadway, where it ran for 31 performances from 13 October 1931 with Banks and Bruce reprising their roles.

== Bibliography ==
- Wearing, J.P. The London Stage 1930-1939: A Calendar of Productions, Performers, and Personnel. Rowman & Littlefield, 2014.
