= Home Is Tomorrow =

1948 play

- Written by: J.B. Priestley
- Original language: English
- Genre: Drama

Premiere
- Date premiered: 11 October 1948
- Place premiered: Princes Theatre, Bradford

Home Is Tomorrow is a 1948 play by the British author J.B. Priestley. It was inspired by Priestley's experience of attending a postwar UNESCO conference. It premiered at the Princes Theatre, Bradford before transferring to the Cambridge Theatre in London's West End running for 37 performances between 4 November and 4 December 1948. The cast included Leslie Banks, Gordon Tanner, Douglas Jefferies, Alan Wheatley, Cecil Trouncer, John Ruddock and Irene Worth.

== Bibliography ==
- Fagge, Roger. The Vision of J.B. Priestley. A&C Black, 2011.
- Gale, Maggie B. J.B. Priestley. Routledge, 2008.
- Wearing, J.P. The London Stage 1940-1949: A Calendar of Productions, Performers, and Personnel. Rowman & Littlefield, 2014.
