= Ferdinand Bruckner =

Austrian-German writer and theater manager

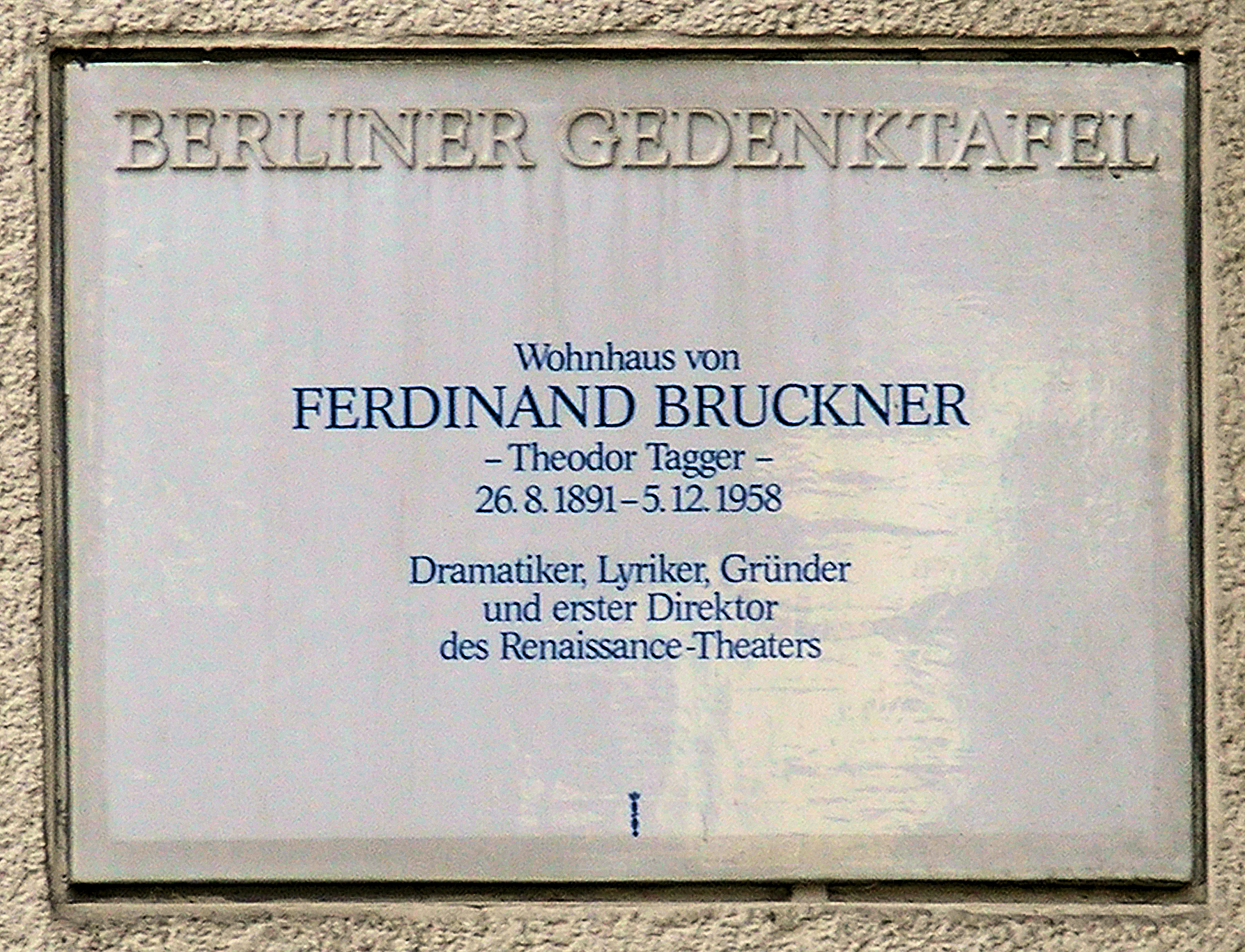
Berlin memorial plaque

Ferdinand Bruckner (born Theodor Tagger; 26 August 1891 – 5 December 1958) was an Austrian-German writer and theater manager. Although his works are relatively rarely revived, Krankheit der Jugend was put on at the Cottesloe stage of London's Royal National Theatre in 2009, under the title Pains of Youth. It was directed by Katie Mitchell and was met with very mixed reviews. Bruckner's play Die Rassen under the title Race was revived in 2001, in New York, by the Classical Stage Company. The critic John Simon called it "both scarily suspenseful and heartbreakingly elegant..." Simon concluded that the play: " comes as close as anything I know to explaining how a cultured nation hurtled into stupefying barbarity."

== Life ==
Bruckner was born in Sofia, Bulgaria. His father was an Austrian businessman and his mother a French translator. After the separation of his parents, he spent time in Vienna and Paris, and in Berlin where he began to study music. However, impressed by the expressionist literary scene in Berlin, in 1916 he moved away from music and devoted himself to poetry. In the following years, he published several poetry collections and in 1917 he began the literary magazine Marsyas with texts from authors like Alfred Döblin and Hermann Hesse. In 1922, he founded the Berlin Renaissance Theater, whose leadership he gave to Gustav Hartung in 1928.

In 1929 and 1930 he released the pieces Krankheit der Jugend (Illness of Youth) and Elisabeth von England (Elizabeth of England) using the pseudonym Ferdinand Bruckner. Bruckner reviewed some of his own plays under his real name. After the success of these works, he revealed their authorship, although he also changed his name itself in 1946.

In 1933 he emigrated to Paris and worked on the anti-fascist play Die Rassen. In 1936, he moved to the United States, although he achieved little success there. In 1953, twenty years after he left Germany, he returned to Berlin where he worked as an advisor to the Schiller Theater. He also wrote a Historische Dramen. He died in Berlin on 5 December 1958.

== Works ==
- Der Herr in den Nebeln, 1917
- Krankheit der Jugend, 1929
- Die Verbrecher, 1929
- Elisabeth von England, 1930
- Die Rassen, 1933
- Simon Bolivar, 1945
- Pyrrhus und Andromache, 1951
