= Count Your Blessings (play) =

1951 play

- Written by: Ronald Jeans
- Original language: English
- Genre: Comedy
- Setting: Brompton Road, London, present day

Premiere
- Date premiered: 12 February 1951
- Place premiered: Garrick Theatre, Southport

Count Your Blessings is a 1951 comedy play by the British writer Ronald Jeans. A married couple draw up a plan to solve their financial problems, but this soon runs into trouble.

It premiered at the Garrick Theatre, Southport before transferring to the West End where it ran for 92 performances between 7 March and 26 June 1951, initially at Wyndham's Theatre and then moving to the Westminster Theatre. The original London cast included Naunton Wayne, Patricia Dainton, Harold Lang, Eileen Way, Ambrosine Phillpotts, Joyce Redman and Viola Lyel.

== Bibliography ==
- Wearing, J.P. The London Stage 1950-1959: A Calendar of Productions, Performers, and Personnel. Rowman & Littlefield, 2014.
