= Can the Leopard...? =

1931 play

- Written by: Ronald Jeans
- Original language: English
- Genre: Comedy
- Setting: London, present day

Premiere
- Date premiered: 5 December 1931
- Place premiered: Haymarket Theatre, London

Can the Leopard...? is a 1931 comedy play by the British writer Ronald Jeans. The title refers to the expression "Can the leopard change its spots?" and features a husband forlornly attempting to reform his wife's reckless ways. The New Statesman review considered the plot to be weak, and relied for its success on the acting quality of the cast.

It ran for 164 performances at the Haymarket Theatre in London's West End between 5 December 1931 and 7 May 1932. The original cast included Ian Hunter, Gertrude Lawrence, Kay Hammond, Kim Peacock, Joan Swinstead and Kathleen Harrison.

== Bibliography ==
- Wearing, J.P. The London Stage 1930-1939: A Calendar of Productions, Performers, and Personnel. Rowman & Littlefield, 2014.
