= The Composite Man =

1935 play

- Original language: English
- Written by: Ronald Jeans
- Genre: Comedy
- Setting: London, present day

Premiere
- Date: 12 October 1935
- Place: Repertory Theatre, Birmingham

The Composite Man is a 1935 comedy play by the British writer Ronald Jeans. The lead character is a successful athlete who is assumed to be a genius in everything else, which is far from the case.

It premiered at the Birmingham Repertory Theatre before transferring to Daly's Theatre in London's West End where it ran for 70 performances between 8 September and 7 November 1936. The original London cast included Richard Bird, James Hayter, Max Adrian, Anthony Holles, Michael Dyne, Hayley Bell, Elspeth Duxbury and Diana Churchill.

== Bibliography ==
- Wearing, J.P. The London Stage 1930-1939: A Calendar of Productions, Performers, and Personnel. Rowman & Littlefield, 2014.
