= Five Finger Exercise =

Five Finger Exercise may refer to:

- Five Finger Exercise (play), 1958
- Five Finger Exercise (film), 1962
