= Vanity Fair (play) =

1946 play

- Original language: English
- Written by: Constance Cox
- Genre: Historical drama

Premiere
- Date: 14 May 1946
- Place: Q Theatre, West London

Vanity Fair is a 1946 play by the British writer Constance Cox, based on William Makepeace Thackeray's 1848 novel of the same name.

It premiered at the Q Theatre before transferring to the Comedy Theatre in London's West End where it ran for 70 performances between 29 October and 21 December 1946. A studio production of this play was broadcast live on BBC television on 3 September 1950 and again on 7 September, starring Belle Chrystall.

== Bibliography ==
- Kabatchnik, Amnon. Blood on the Stage, 1950-1975: Milestone Plays of Crime, Mystery, and Detection. Scarecrow Press, 2011.
- Wearing, J.P. The London Stage 1940-1949: A Calendar of Productions, Performers, and Personnel. Rowman & Littlefield, 2014.
