= Luisa Josefina Hernández =

Mexican writer and playwright (1928–2023)

Luisa Josefina Hernández (2 November 1928 – 16 January 2023) was a Mexican writer and playwright.

Hernández died on 16 January 2023, at the age of 94.

== Works ==
=== Plays ===
- Aguardiente de caña, 1951.
- Botica modelo, 1954.
- Los frutos caídos, 1955.
- Los huéspedes reales, 1956.
- La paz ficticia, 1960.
- El orden de los factores, 1983.
- El amigo secreto, 1986.
- Carta de Navegaciones Submarina, 1987.
- Habrá poesía, 1990.
- Las bodas, 1993.
- Zona templada, 1993.
- Los grandes muertos, 1999-2001.
- Una noche para bruno, 2007.
- La fiesta del mulato, 1966. Translated by William I. Oliver as 'The Mulatto's Orgy', Voices of Change in the Spanish American Theater, Austin: University of Texas Press, 1971, pp.219-55

=== Novels ===
- Apocalipsis cum figuris, 1951
- El lugar donde crece la hierba, 1959
- Los palacios desiertos, 1963
- La cólera secreta, 1964
- El valle que elegimos, 1965
- La memoria de Amadís, 1967
- La Cabalgata, 1969
- Nostalgia de Troya, 1970
- Apostasía, 1978

=== Other ===
- Beckett. Sentido y método de dos obras, 1997.
- Una lectura de Yerma de Federico García Lorca, 2006.
