= Safed Khoon =

Safed Khoon or Safed Khun is an Urdu play by Agha Hashar Kashmiri, based on Shakespeare's King Lear. It was published in 1907.
