= Aankh ka Nasha =

Aankh ka Nasha or Ankh ka Nasha (The Witchery of the Eyes) is an Urdu play by Agha Hashar Kashmiri. It was first published in 1924.

The play deals with themes of treachery and the evils of prostitution. It was made into a film by the same name in India in 1956, starring Anita Guha and M. Rajan in lead roles with Helen and Shammi in supporting roles. Other Indian film adaptations include a 1928 silent film by Madan Theatres and its 1933 remake in sound by J. J. Madan.
