= Sergei Tretyakov (writer) =

Russian author, poet, playwright and journalist

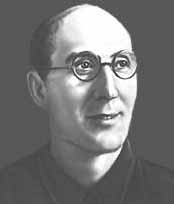
Sergey Mikhailovich Tretiakov

Sergei Mikhailovich Tretyakov (Russian: Серге́й Миха́йлович Третьяко́в; 20 June 1892, Goldingen, Courland Governorate, Russian Empire (today Kuldīga, Latvia) – September 10, 1937, Moscow, Russian SFSR, USSR) was a Soviet Russian constructivist writer, playwright, poet, and special correspondent for Pravda.

== Life and career ==
Sergei Tretyakov was born to a Russian father, Mikhail Konstantinovich Tretyakov, and a Baltic German mother, Elizaveta (Elfriede) Emmanuilovna Tretyakova (née Meller). His father was a school teacher. Tretyakov graduated in 1916 from the department of law at Moscow University. He began to publish in 1913 and just before the Russian Revolution he became associated with the ego-futurists. In 1919 he married Ol’ga Viktorovna Gomolitskaya. Soon after the publication of Iron Pause, he became heavily involved in the Siberian futurist movement known as Creation along with artists such as Nikolay Aseyev and David Burlyuk.

Tretyakov was one of the founders of the constructivist journal LEF, (1923–1925), and its successor Novyi LEF ("New LEF", 1927–1928), and of the associated artistic movement, whose main driving force was the poet Vladimir Mayakovsky. They declared war on "bourgeois" culture and claimed that the experimental avant garde works they produced were the artistic voice of the Bolshevik revolution. Boris Pasternak did not believe that any of the group actually wanted to destroy pre-revolutionary art, with one exception: "The only consistent and honest man in this group of negationists was Sergei Tretyakov, who drove his negation to its natural conclusion. Like Plato, Tretyakov considered that there was no place for art in a young socialist state."

Tretyakov's first play, Earth Rampant, also known as The World Turned Upside Down, directed by Vsevolod Meyerhold and premiered on March 4, 1923, was a commercial success that ran to 44 performances in 11 weeks, rescuing Moscow's Sohn Theatre, in which it was staged, from imminent bankruptcy. It was dedicated to "the Red Army and the first soldier of the RSFSR, Leon Trotsky". Tretyakov's next two plays, Can You Hear Me, Moscow? and Gas Masks (both 1924) were directed by the young Sergei Eisenstein. The latter was staged in the Moscow Gas Works, for maximum realism.

In 1924, Sergei Tretyakov made a lengthy visit to China, where he taught Russian literature and collected materials for some of his later publications. He wrote the poem Roar, China! (Rychi Kitai), and shortly afterwards turned into a play which predicted events similar to those which ultimately occurred during the Wanhsien Incident, had its premiere at the Meyerhold Theatre on January 23, 1926, and later went on foreign tour, and on tour of provincial theatres in the USSR. Tretyakov also wrote the controversial I Want a Baby (1926), which has seen recent performances in Europe and America. The play advocated selective breeding for the purposes of political purity. Meyerhold immediately accepted it for production, but then spent four years battling with censorship to get it put on stage. Between 1930 and 1931 Tretyakov travelled in Germany, Denmark, and Austria. Before he fell foul of the authorities he translated and popularised other European writers such as Bertolt Brecht. Brecht was also familiar with Tretyakov's literary work and indeed stayed with him in 1935. Tretyakov contributed song lyrics to the film Song of Heroes (1932), directed by Joris Ivens and set in music by Hanns Eisler.

Tretyakov was arrested on July 25, 1937, during the Great Purge and charged with espionage. He had fallen under suspicion because of his contacts with foreign writers, and because the political attitudes he had expressed in the 1920s were no longer tolerated. His play I Want a Baby was denounced in Pravda in December 1937 as "a hostile slur on the Soviet family." He was sentenced to death on September 10, 1937, though in the introduction to the English publication of I Want a Baby, Robert Leach says it seems that in a last act of defiance he threw himself to his death down the stairwell at Butyrka prison. It was standard procedure for those sentenced to death to be photographed prior to execution: the last photograph of Tretyakov, staring defiantly at the camera, is reproduced in David King's book Ordinary Citizens (2003). Tretyakov was posthumously rehabilitated in 1956.

== See also ==
- Russian avant-garde
- Soviet art

Tretyakov worked with:

- Vsevolod Meyerhold (director)
- Sergei Eisenstein (director)
- El Lissitzky (stage designer)
- Vladimir Mayakovsky (poet, playwright)
- Osip Brik (literary theorist, essayist)
- Alexander Rodchenko (artist and photographer) and his wife
- Varvara Stepanova who was a fellow constructivist and textile designer.

== Works ==
By S.M Tretyakov:

- "Roar, China!: A Drama in Seven Scenes", Rialto Service Bureau, (1930)
- "Iron Pause" Vladivostok, 1919 (book of verse)
- "I Want a Baby!" University of Birmingham, (1995), ISBN 0-7044-1620-4
- "Gas Masks" Vserossiisky Proletkult, (1924)
- "Can You Hear, Moscow?" Vserossiisky Proletkult, (1924)
- "A Chinese Testament: The Autobiography of Tan Shih-hua", Gollancz, (1934)
- "The Country Crossroad: Five Weeks in Czechoslovakia", Sovetsky Pisatel, (1937) Hardback

Other notable performances:

- Immaconcep, a parody of the creation of the Komsomol using the Christian Nativity. Vsevolod Meyerhold's students toured youth clubs and workers clubs putting on this performance. The title "Immaconcep" is a modern contraction of the phrase Immaculate Conception (see Newspeak from George Orwell's Nineteen-Eighty-Four (1949) for a similar use of this device).
- The World Turned Upside Down, an adaptation of Marcel Martinet's poem La nuit (1922), presented at the Meyerhold Theatre in Moscow on 7 November 1923 and directed by Vsevolod Meyerhold.
