= The Chalk Garden =

The Chalk Garden may refer to:

- The Chalk Garden (play), a 1955 play by Enid Bagnold
- The Chalk Garden (film), a 1964 British-American film, based on the play
