= The Likes of Her =

1923 play by Charles McEvoy

- Original language: English
- Written by: Charles McEvoy
- Genre: Drama

Premiere
- Date: 30 January 1923
- Place: Battersea Town Hall, London

The Likes of Her is a 1923 play by the British writer Charles McEvoy.

It premiered at Battersea Town Hall on 30 January 1923. It enjoyed a West End run of 229 performances at St Martin's Theatre between 15 August 1923 and 1 March 1924. The original cast included Leslie Banks, (replaced by Clifford Mollison) Ian Hunter, Ben Field, Allan Jeayes (replaced by Felix Aylmer), Ivor Barnard, Mary Clare, Olga Lindo, Barbara Gott and Hermione Baddeley.

== Film adaptation ==
The 1931 film Sally in Our Alley was loosely adapted from the play, with several of the original actors appearing including Ian Hunter. The film was designed as a vehicle for the music hall star Gracie Fields, making her screen debut, and was a major commercial success.

== Bibliography ==
- Goble, Alan. The Complete Index to Literary Sources in Film. Walter de Gruyter, 1999.
- Wearing, J.P. The London Stage 1920-1929: A Calendar of Productions, Performers, and Personnel. Rowman & Littlefield, 2014.
