= El censo =

El censo is a 1957 comedy play by Mexican dramatist Emilio Carballido.

== Plot ==
The play opens in an unregistered sewing shop in La Lagunilla in 1945. A wealthy upper-class woman, Remedios, is being fitted for a new dress by two sisters, Herlinda and Dora. The third seamstress, Concha, represents the overworked and underpaid lowest class. Concha resents her position and strikes out at the sisters by trying to undermine the economic exchange between the sisters and Remedios. Although struggling to make ends meet, Herlinda and Dora are able to survive on their profits by not registering with the government, which would require them to pay taxes on their earnings. When a census-taker arrives at the door, the sisters panic and try all sorts of methods to get rid of him. Herlinda tries to bribe the census-taker with money with the hope that the shop's information will not end up in the department of tax collection. The census-taker is frustrated with the inability to acquire the information from the sisters and we soon learn that he, too, is a victim of an economic depression and is only trying to make ends meet himself.

== Themes ==
The play's central themes are:

1. Class conflict between the various characters in the play
2. The informal economy
3. Machismo, in the drunk character Paco
