= Sita Banbas =

Urdu play by Agha Hashar Kasmiri

Sita Banbas or Sita ban bas (Sita's Exile) is an Urdu play by Agha Hashar Kashmiri. It is based on the Hindu Ramayana. Kashmiri originally sold the play to a local Raja in Allahabad and it was eventually published in 1928, and it was later published in Hindustani.
