= Hugh Mills (writer) =

British writer (1913–1971)

- Born: 1913; United Kingdom
- Died: 1971
- Occupation(s): Novelist, playwright, screenwriter

Hugh Mills (1913–1971) was a British novelist, playwright and screenwriter. His 1939 play As You Are was made into the film Turned Out Nice Again while his comedy novel Prudence and the Pill was adapted into a 1968 film of the same title. Before making his name in theatre he briefly worked in advertising.

== Selected filmography ==
- The Beloved Vagabond (1936)
- The Man in the Mirror (1936)
- Personal Property (1937)
- Blanche Fury (1948)
- So Long at the Fair (1950)
- Maria Chapdelaine (1950)
- Blackmailed (1951)
- Knave of Hearts (1954)

== Selected plays ==
- Laughter in Court (1936)
- As You Are (1939)
- Angels in Love (1953)
- The Little Glass Clock (1954)
- The House by the Lake (1956)

== Bibliography ==
- Bedford, Sybille. Aldous Huxley: 1894-1939. Chatto and Windus; Collins, 1973.
- Goble, Alan. The Complete Index to Literary Sources in Film. Walter de Gruyter, 1999.
- Wearing, J.P. The London Stage 1950–1959: A Calendar of Productions, Performers, and Personnel. Rowman & Littlefield, 2014.
