= The Romance of David Garrick =

1942 plays

- Original language: English
- Written by: Constance Cox
- Genre: Historical

Premiere
- Date: 29 December 1942
- Place: St James's Theatre, London

The Romance of David Garrick is a 1942 historical play by British writer Constance Cox.

It ran for 35 performances at St James's Theatre in London's West End. Donald Wolfit both directed and starred as the eighteenth century actor David Garrick.

== Bibliography ==
- Kabatchnik, Amnon. Blood on the Stage, 1950-1975: Milestone Plays of Crime, Mystery, and Detection. Scarecrow Press, 2011.
- Wearing, J.P. The London Stage 1940-1949: A Calendar of Productions, Performers, and Personnel. Rowman & Littlefield, 2014.
