= Color Struck =

Play by Zora Neale Hurston

- Original language: English
- Written by: Zora Neale Hurston

Premiere
- Date: 1926

Color Struck is a play by Zora Neale Hurston. It was originally published in 1926 in Fire!! magazine. Color Struck won second prize in Opportunity Magazine's literary contest for best play. Color Struck was not staged during the Harlem Renaissance.

== Plot summary ==
Color Struck opens on a train in 1900, with members of the black community from Jacksonville, Florida, going to a cakewalk competition in St. Augustine. Hurston specifies that the first scene takes place "inside a 'Jim Crow' railway coach." With much bustle, John and Emmaline arrive at the train just on time. Emmaline made John take the last coach, because she felt he was flirting with Effie, a lighter-skinned black woman.

The play's title focuses on colorism, the idea that people in the black community were judged based on the hue of their skin. Emma is terrified that John will leave her for a lighter-skinned woman, and is very jealous; Emma says, "I loves you so hard, John, and jealous love is the only kind I got."

At the dance hall, everyone eats their picnic lunches, and Effie offers John a piece of pie. He accepts, though he knows it will upset Emma. Emma refuses to dance the cakewalk with him, even though they are favoured to win the competition. John instead dances the cakewalk with Effie, and they win the prize.

Twenty years pass, and we rejoin Emma in "a one-room shack in an alley." Her daughter, who we later learn is named Lou Lillian, is in bed, feverishly ill. John knocks on the door, and tells her he missed her. He had been married, but his wife died, and he has come to marry Emma now. Emma is thrilled, but wary. John looks forward to raising Lou Lillian as his own, and having a family. Lou Lillian is very sick, and John sends Emma for a doctor. Emma will not go to a "colored doctor," and eventually goes to bring the white doctor. As she is about to leave, she comes back and sees John ministering to Lou Lillian. Emma assumes that John is only being nice to Lou Lillian because she is half-white. In a rage, Emma attacks John. John leaves, and the doctor arrives. The doctor is too late, and Emma's daughter is dead. The doctor remonstrates Emma for not having come earlier, an hour would have made all the difference. As the doctor leaves, Emma is left on stage in a rocking chair, staring at the door, "A dry sob now and then."

== Characters ==
- Emmaline (Emma): a color-obsessed and paranoid Black woman with dark skin
- John: a light-brown-skinned man (not a mulatto) who is deeply in love with Emma
- Effie: a mulatto woman who Emma is jealous of
- Other: Man, Wesley, Emmaline's Daughter, Effie, Doctor, Railway Conductor, Dance Master, Dinky, Ada, Joe Clarke, Woman, Another Man, Girl, Lizz, Clark, Master. Additional Character Info.

== Themes and Motifs ==
Colorism

Throughout the play Emma is overly and self-destructively preoccupied with skin color. Emma is plagued by colorism—intra-racial racism—which causes her to be jealous of light-skinned Black people and despise her own Blackness.

John: "(kisses her). Emma, what makes you always picking a fuss with me over some yaller girl. What makes you so jealous, nohow? I don’t do nothing." Scene I

Insecurities/Self-destruction

Emma is constantly worried that John will leave her for a light-skinned woman. Her insecurities have adverse effects including, losing John for twenty years and allowing her mulatto daughter to die.

John: "… So this the woman I’ve been wearing over my heart like rose for twenty years! She so despises her own that she can’t believe any one else could love it…. Twenty years! Twenty years of adoration, hunger, of worship! (On the verge of tears he…exits quietly…)." Scene IV

Hate/Anger/Animosity

Emma displays anger towards John any time a light-skinned woman is in their midst.

Emma: "Oh-them yaller wenches! How I hate em! They gets everything they wants." Scene II

Distorted Vision/Blindness

Emma is unable to see situations as they really are; she constantly accuses John of being more interested in light-skinned women and fails to see his sincere love for her. Also, when the doctor comes to the home in scene IV, Emma reveals she is unable to see well.

John: "Ah don’t make you! You makes yo’self mad, den blame it on me. Ah keep on tellin’ you Ah don't love nobody but you. Ah knows heaps uh half-white girls Ah could get ef Ah wanted to But (he squeezes her hand again) Ah jus’ wants you! You know what they say! De darker de berry, de sweeter de taste!" Scene II

== Additional Quotes ==
John: "It was Emmaline nearly made us get left. She says I wuz smiling at Effie on the street car and she had to get off and wait for another."Scene I

John: "I wuzn’t. I never gits a chance tuh smile at nobody--you won’t let me." Scene I

Emma: "Jes the same every time you sees a yaller face, you takes a chance." Scene I

Emma: "….Everything she do is pretty to you." Scene I

Emma: "….I can’t help mahself from being jealous. I loves you so hard, John, and jealous love is the only kind I got." Scene I

== Analysis, Critiques, and Literature on the Play ==
According to Martha Gilman Bower, Emma is an exemplar case of the "damaging consequences of an obsession with skin tone among Blacks." The consequences of being "color struck" that one sees throughout the play is escalating anger, low self-esteem, paranoia, and schizophrenia. Bower also points out, Emma does not show animosity towards segregation, but rather is angered by the intra-race hierarchy. Because of Emma's "psychotic obsession with color", she is unable to truly be happy, love, overcome oppression, and consequently is "the only miserable character." Such obsession is self-destructive, distorts vision, and has the possibility of ruining opportunities.

According to Michael North, "’Color struck’ is a term for [Emma's] obsession but also for the retreat it causes." Yet, the term "color struck" was popularized by Hurston in at a party after the 1925 Opportunity awards dinner when she comes in and "[triumphantly cries], ‘Calaaaah struuuck." North interprets such triumph that Hurston imbues in the cry as what she intended to do with the play. North also points out the historical background of the cakewalk, highlighting its minstrelsy origins; he writes "the cakewalk [is] a cliché of black life."

Faedra Chatard Carpenter offers an insightful analysis of "Color Struck" in the article, "Addressing the ‘Complex’-ities of Skin Color: Intra-Racism in the Plays of Hurston, Kennedy, and Orlandersmith. She writes:

The topical significance of Color Struck is in how it challenges assumptions associated with color-consciousness. Rather than staging the color-complex as a unilateral dynamic in which lightskinned blacks reject and separate themselves from their darker brethren (the narrative of the "uppity" light-skinned black), Hurston dramatizes the fact that color prejudice takes many forms. In effect, the dramatic twist Hurston portrays is twofold: both John and Emma are "color struck," albeit in opposing and unpredictable ways. Emma is drawn to light skin (notably, after her relationship with John fails, she presumably has a sexual relationship/encounter with a white man, resulting in the birth of a "very white girl"), while John exhibits color-consciousness in his preference for dark-skinned women (after the breakup, he consciously seeks out a darker-skinned wife that "was jus’ as much" like Emma as possible) (348).

== Further Resources ==
- Complete text of the play available online: Color Struck
- A facsimile reprint of the magazine Fire!!
- Bower, Martha Gilman. "Color Struck Under the Gaze: Ethnicity and the Pathology of Being in the Plays of Johnson, Hurston, Childress, Hansberry, and Kennedy."
- Carpenter, Faedra Chatard. "Addressing 'The Complex'-ities of Skin Color: Intra-Racism in the Plays of Hurston, Kennedy, and Orlandersmith."
- Harris, Will. "Women Playwrights and the Dual Liberation Motif."
- Heard, Matthew. "'Dancing is Dancing No Matter Who is Doing It': Zora Neale Hurston, Literacy, and Contemporary Writing Pedagogy."
- Krasner, David. "Migration, Fragmentation, and Identity: Zora Neale Hurston's Color Struck and the Geography of the Harlem Renaissance." Krasner
- North, Michael. "The Dialect of Modernism: Race, Language, and Twentieth-Century Literature."
