= Matchmaker =

A matchmaker, or marriage broker, is a person who engages in pairing single people for marriage, sometimes as a profession.

Matchmaker or The Matchmaker may also refer to:

== Films and television ==
=== Feature films ===
- The Matchmaker (1934 film), an Italian comedy film directed by Amleto Palermi
- The Matchmaker (1958 film), a film starring Shirley Booth
- The Matchmaker (1997 film), a film starring Janeane Garofalo
- The Matchmaker (2010 film), an Israeli film
- The Matchmaker (2018 film), a short drama film directed by Leonora Pitts

=== Television ===
- Matchmaker (game show), a late 1980s dating show
- Matchmaker, an English-language Canadian television series
- Svaty, a Ukrainian TV series
- "Matchmaker" (How I Met Your Mother), a 2005 episode
- "The Matchmaker" (Frasier), a 1994 episode
- The Matchmakers (TV series), a 2023 South Korean television series

== Songs, plays and paintings ==
- “Matchmaker, Matchmaker”, a 1964 song from the musical Fiddler on the Roof
- The Matchmaker (play), a 1955 play by Thornton Wilder
- The Matchmaker (Honthorst), a 1625 painting by Gerard van Honthorst
- Matchmaker, a 1975 play by John B. Keane
- "Matchmaker", a song by Hailey Blais on the 2023 album Wisecrack

== Other uses ==
- Matchmakers, an elongated confectionery snack
- Matchmakers' Union, a trade association for match factory workers

== See also ==
- Matchmaking, the process of matching two or more people together
- Matchmaker.com, an internet dating service
