= Agha Hashar Kashmiri =

Urdu poet and playwright (1879-1935)

- Born: Muhammad Shah; 3 April 1879; Banaras, India
- Died: 1 April 1935 (aged 56); Lahore, Punjab Province, British India (now in Punjab, Pakistan)
- Occupations: Dramatist, playwright, poet
- Spouse: Mukhtar Begum
- Relatives: Farida Khanum (sister-in-law)

Agha Hashar Kashmiri (Urdu: آغا حشر کاشمیری born Muhammad Shah; 3 April 1879 – 1 April 1935) was an Urdu poet, playwright and dramatist. A number of his plays were Indian Shakespearean adaptations.

== Early life ==
Muhammad Shah (Agha Hashar Kashmiri was his pen name) was born in Benares State, British India in 1879. He started to show interest in stage dramas and moved to Bombay at the age of 14 and started his career as a playwright there.

== Career ==
Agha Hashar Kashmiri's first play, Aftab-e-Muhabbat, was published in 1897. He started his professional career as a drama writer for the New Alfred Theatrical Company in Bombay, on a salary of only 15 Rs. per month. Mureed-e-Shak, his first play for the company, was an adaptation of Shakespeare's play The Winter's Tale. It proved to be a success and his wages were later raised to Rs. 40 per month due to his growing popularity. In his works, Agha had experience introducing shorter songs and dialogues with idioms and poetic virtues in plays. He then wrote several more adaptations of Shakespeare's plays, including Shaheed-e-Naaz (or Achuta Daaman in Hindi), Measure for Measure, 1902) and Shabeed-e-Havas (King John, 1907).

Yahudi Ki Ladki (The Daughter of a Jew), published in 1913, became his best known work. In the coming years, it became a classic in Parsi-Urdu theatre. It was adapted several times in the silent film and early talkies eras, notably Yahudi Ki Ladki (1933) by New Theatres, Yahudi Ki Ladki and by Bimal Roy, as Yahudi (1958) starring Dilip Kumar, Meena Kumari and Sohrab Modi.

His most popular plays are Sita Banbas, based on the Ramayana; Bilwa Mangal, a social play on the life of a poet with a passion for whores; Aankh ka Nasha (The Witchery of the Eyes) which deals with themes of treachery and the evils of prostitution; and Rustom O Sohrab, a Persian folk story and tragedy. Several of his notable Shakespeare-inspired plays are Safed Khoon (White Blood), based on King Lear and Khwab-e-Hasti (The Dream World of Existence) described as "a mutilated version of Macbeth."

== Personal life ==
Agha was married to Mukhtar Begum, a classical singer from Calcutta and elder sister of Farida Khanum - a Pakistani singer. Shortly before his death in 1935, Agha Hashar Kashmiri along with his singer wife Mukhtar Begum moved to Lahore, British India. He had a good reason to move there because Lahore was a center of Urdu language, publishing and literature at that time.

== His ghazals featured in film and television ==
- "Chori Kaheen Khule Na Naseem-e-Bahar Ki" Sung by Tina Sani, a Pakistan Television production- originally sung by Mukhtar Begum (Agha Hashar Kashmiri's wife) in 1938.
- "Ghair Ki Baaton Ka Aakhir Eitbaar Aa Hee Gaya" Sung by Naseem Begum, music by Khalil Ahmed in 1965 Pakistani film Kaneez
- Another popular ghazal by Agha Hashar Kashmiri is "Mein chaman mein khush nahin hoon, Mere aur hain iraday" that was recently paid a rich tribute by Ali Sethi.

== Death and legacy ==
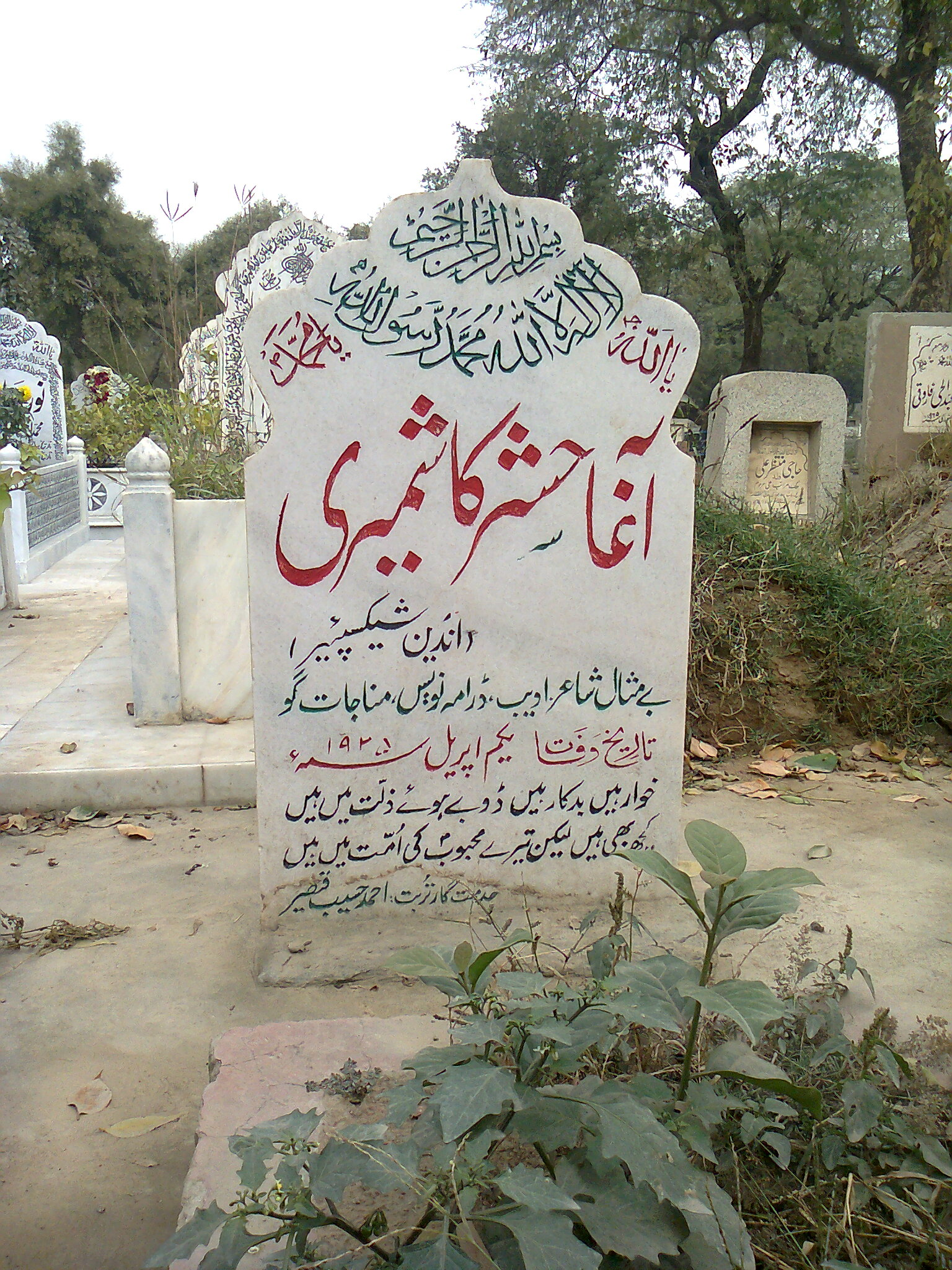
Agha Hashar's grave in Lahore

Kashmiri died on 1 April 1935 in Lahore, British India. He is mentioned in some detail in the literary memoirs of the late Hakim Ahmad Shuja, with whom he collaborated on several dramatic projects.

His 70th death anniversary was observed in Karachi in 2005 at an event organized by the National Academy of Performing Arts at the Arts Council of Pakistan in Karachi. Zia Mohyeddin, chief of the 'National Academy of Performing Arts' and other speakers paid tributes to him. Anwar Sajjad said," Whenever the history of theater in the subcontinent is written, Agha Hashar Kashmiri will certainly hold an important place in it".

== Writings ==
Kashmiri's plays include:

- Aankh ka Nasha
- Asir-e-Hirs
- Bhagirath Ganga
- Dil to Pyas
- Khwab-e-Hasti
- Madhur Murli
- Rustom O Sohrab
- Safed Khoon
- Said-e-Hawas
- Sita Banbas
- Turki Hur
- Yahudi Ki Ladki

== See also ==
- Agha Hasan Amanat
- Hakim Ahmad Shuja
