= Charles McEvoy =

British dramatist (1879–1929)

- Born: 30 June 1879; London
- Died: 16 February 1929 (aged 49); Somerset, England, United Kingdom
- Occupation: Writer
- Years active: 1907–1929

Charles McEvoy (1879–1929) was a British playwright and stage director. He was originally a journalist before switching to creative writing in 1907, becoming known for his realism. His 1923 play The Likes of Her was adapted into a 1931 film Sally in Our Alley. His brother was the artist Ambrose McEvoy.

He died of cancer in 1929, aged 49.

== Selected works ==
- David Ballard (1907)
- The Village Wedding (1910) – premiered at McEvoy's theatre in his home village of Aldbourne, Wiltshire with an amateur cast; taken to Manchester but failed in London
- All That Matters (1911, West End)
- The Likes of Her (1923, West End); the 1931 film Sally in Our Alley, starring Gracie Fields, is loosely based on the play

== Bibliography ==
- Goble, Alan. The Complete Index to Literary Sources in Film. Walter de Gruyter, 1999.
- Wearing, J.P. The London Stage 1920-1929: A Calendar of Productions, Performers, and Personnel. Rowman & Littlefield, 2014.
