= I Want a Baby =

I Want a Baby (Russian: Хочу ребёнка) is a 1926 play by a Russian playwright Sergei Tretyakov.

== Plot ==
Milda, a cultural education worker, decides that she wants to have a baby — without a father or a family, bred from best proletarian stock of her choice. The child is to be raised by the communal child-rearing organizations that Milda herself is helping to establish as part of the Bolshevik’s effort to construct the ideal socialist state. Doing her best to ignore the meddling and scorn of the unruly co-tenants in her crowded Moscow apartment block, Milda sets out to complete her mission. Eventually she fulfills her dream after a laborious, comic, melodramatic, and tragic journey.

== Comments ==
Divided into 14 episodes, the play is constructed following the principles of “the Montage of Attraction.” Prismatic or kaleidoscopic in structure, it centers on an overcrowded apartment complex in urgent need of renovation. Conceived as a “discussion play”, the planned productions in Moscow and Leningrad were censored, re-censored, and finally indefinitely postponed due primarily to the graphic depiction of violence and unrest in Soviet society, as well as the play’s sexual explicitness.
