= Angels in Love =

1953 play

- Written by: Hugh Mills
- Original language: English
- Genre: Comedy
- Setting: Lord Fauntleroy's country estate, outside London

Premiere
- Date premiered: 24 August 1953
- Place premiered: Royal Court Theatre, Liverpool

Angels in Love is a 1953 comedy play by the British writer Hugh Mills. It premiered at the Royal Court Theatre in Liverpool. It later transferred to the Savoy Theatre in London's West End where it ran for 203 performances between 11 February and 17 August 1954. The West End cast featured Peter Hammond, Barbara Kelly, Peter Reynolds, Kynaston Reeves, Henry Kendall, Christopher Morahan, Myles Rudge and Maxine Audley. It portrays the life of the now grown-up Little Lord Fauntleroy.

== Bibliography ==
- Wearing, J.P. The London Stage 1950–1959: A Calendar of Productions, Performers, and Personnel. Rowman & Littlefield, 2014.
