= The Little Glass Clock =

1954 play

- Original language: English
- Written by: Hugh Mills
- Genre: Historical comedy
- Setting: France, mid-Eighteenth century

Premiere
- Date: 12 October 1954
- Place: King's Theatre, Edinburgh

The Little Glass Clock is a 1954 historical comedy play by the British author Hugh Mills. It premiered at the King's Theatre, Edinburgh before transferring to the Aldwych Theatre in London's West End where it ran for 138 performances 3 December 1954 and 2 April 1955. The West End cast featured John Clements, Kay Hammond, George Curzon, Basil Sydney and George Relph.

== Bibliography ==
- Spencer, Charles. Cecil Beaton, Stage and Film Designs. Academy Editions, 1975.
- Wearing, J.P. The London Stage 1950–1959: A Calendar of Productions, Performers, and Personnel. Rowman & Littlefield, 2014.
