= The House by the Lake =

1956 British stage thriller by Hugh Mills

- Original language: English
- Written by: Hugh Mills
- Genre: Thriller
- Setting: Country house outside London, present day

Premiere
- Date: 30 April 1956
- Place: Prince of Wales Theatre, Cardiff

The House by the Lake is a 1956 British stage thriller in three acts, by Hugh Mills. The main characters are Maurice and Stella, a brother and sister who plot to murder their unlikeable brother, Colin. The other characters include Maurice's wife, Janet, Colin's long-suffering wife, Iris, and Colonel Forbes, a neighbour.

It premiered at the Prince of Wales Theatre, Cardiff before transferring to London's West End, where it ran for two years, starring Flora Robson and Andrew Cruickshank; and has since become a staple of amateur dramatics.

== Original production ==
The play, directed by John Fernald, opened at the Duke of York's Theatre on 9 May 1956, with the following cast:

- Brenda - Doreen Morton
- Colin - Paul Lee
- Colonel Forbes - Andrew Laurence
- Colonel Forbes - Frank Royde
- Iris - Sylvia Coleridge
- Janet Holt - Flora Robson
- Maurice Holt - Andrew Cruickshank
- Mr Howard - Alan McNaughtan
- Mr. Howard - Richard Warner
- Nurse Thomson - Annette Kerr
- Stella - Jenny Laird

The production was designed by Fanny Taylor.

== Bibliography ==
- Wearing, J.P. The London Stage 1950–1959: A Calendar of Productions, Performers, and Personnel. Rowman & Littlefield, 2014.
