= All That Matters (play) =

1911 play by Charles McEvoy

- Written by: Charles McEvoy
- Original language: English
- Genre: Comedy

Premiere
- Date premiered: 8 February 1911
- Place premiered: Haymarket Theatre, London

All That Matters is a comedy play by the British writer Charles McEvoy.

It ran for 45 performances between 8 February and 18 March 1911 at the Haymarket Theatre in London's West End. The original cast included Phyllis Neilson-Terry, Norman Trevor, C.V. France, J. Fisher White, Norman Page, Clare Greet, Helen Haye and Sydney Fairbrother.

== Bibliography ==
- Wearing, J.P. The London Stage 1910-1919: A Calendar of Productions, Performers, and Personnel. Scarecrow Press, 2013.
