= Ronald Jeans =

British playwright (1887–1973)

Ronald Jeans (10 May 1887 – 16 May 1973) was a British playwright with a career spanning nearly 50 years.

== Early life ==
Ronald Jeans was born in Oxton, Merseyside, the younger son of Sir Alexander Grigor Jeans (1849–1924), the founder and managing editor of the Liverpool Post and Mercury, and his wife, Ellen Gallon (d. 1889).

== Career ==
According to his entry in the Oxford Dictionary of National Biography, "Between the 1930s and 1955 he was one of the West End's most reliable sources of undemanding, expertly crafted social comedy."

Jeans wrote the 1916 short revue "Oh, Law!" produced by Fred Karno, which was a revue version of Karno's most famous sketch "Mumming Birds." The plot of "Oh, Law!" centered on a dispute between rival revue producers in a copyright battle over the fictional show "Have a Banana!". It starred Vernon Watson as lead comic, impersonating music hall stars of the day.

== Selected plays ==
- Hullo, Repertory! (1915)
- No Reflection on the Wife (1915)
- Higgledy-Piggledy (1915)
- Oh, Law! (1916)
- Tabs (1918)
- Buzz Buzz (1918)
- Can the Leopard...? (1931)
- Lean Harvest (1931)
- The Composite Man (1935)
- Young Wives' Tale (1949)
- Count Your Blessings (1951)
- Grace and Favour (1954)

== Personal life ==
On 6 June 1917, he married Margaret Evelyn Wise. They had a son and a daughter, Angela Jeans, an actress and model. She married Henry "Sam" Ainley, a merchant seaman, journalist and restaurateur, but they divorced. Their daughter Clarissa Dalrymple is an art curator.

Jeans died at 14 Eaton Gardens, Hove, on 16 May 1973.
