= Quiet Weekend =

1946 British film by Harold French

- Directed by: Harold French
- Written by: Victor Skutezky; Stephen Black; T. J. Morrison; Warwick Ward
- Based on: the play Quiet Weekend by Esther McCracken
- Produced by: Warwick Ward
- Starring: Derek Farr; Frank Cellier; Marjorie Fielding; George Thorpe; Barbara White
- Cinematography: Eric Cross
- Edited by: Flora Newton
- Music by: Charles Williams
- Production company: ABPC
- Distributed by: Pathe Pictures Ltd
- Release date: 29 July 1946
- Running time: 83 minutes
- Country: United Kingdom
- Language: English
- Box office: £184,082 (UK)

Quiet Weekend (also known as Quiet Week End) is a 1946 British comedy film directed by Harold French and starring Derek Farr, Frank Cellier, Marjorie Fielding, George Thorpe and Barbara White. It was written by Victor Skutezky, Stephen Black, T. J. Morrison and Warwick Ward based on the long running 1941 West End play Quiet Weekend by Esther McCracken, and was made at Welwyn Studios, Welwyn Garden City and Berkshire.

A family try to relax during a weekend holiday in the country. It was a sequel to the 1941 film Quiet Wedding, with several of the actors reprising their roles.

Director Harold French called it "pleasant enough in its silly way".

== Plot ==
The Royds drive down to their spacious cottage in the country. Denys informs his mother Mildred, the matriarch of the family, that he has invited Rowena Hyde. She shows up in a chauffeur-driven car. Also making an appearance is patriarch Arthur Royd's friend Adrian Barrasford. The pair go fishing. When Adrian reveals he is very fond of Mary Jarrow, Arthur invites him to supper, as Mary will be there. Miranda Bute, nearly eighteen years old, is another surprise guest. Mildred becomes a bit concerned, as she knows that Miranda, her niece, is attached to Denys (though he himself is oblivious), making for an awkward situation.

When Miranda discovers that Denys has turned down an attractive job offer because there was "just no money in it", she is sure there is "something behind this". Then she encounters Rowena, who informs her that Denys has accepted a well-paying job in Hollywood as a private secretary, rather than pursuing a career as a scenic designer. She eventually quarrels with Denys over his decision.

Adrian takes Arthur and Mildred's advice to make his intentions known, only to have Mary misconstrue his proposal as an offer to sell her his house. He, on the other hand, thinks she has turned down his offer of marriage.

Denys and Rowena go to a party of her upper-class friends. He becomes annoyed when she chooses Paul Perry (Denys's future employer) instead of him as her partner in a game.

Meanwhile, Arthur, Adrian and Sam sneak off to do some poaching; Miranda joins them, and after much searching, they catch a large salmon. However, they are spotted and chased by the authorities. Miranda flags down a passing car, which turns out to be driven by Denys. He lies to a policeman to keep her out of trouble and takes her home, where she changes down to her smalls and keeps herself warm in Denys' dressing gown. Arthur and Adrian eventually show up, but Sam is caught and taken into custody. Arthur has to get Adrian, in his official capacity as the local justice of the peace, to allow him to bail out their fellow poacher.

The next morning, Miranda is delighted to learn that Denys has changed his mind and declined the Hollywood job. It soon becomes apparent that he has also drastically changed his view of Miranda as well. Adrian, emboldened by his experience the night before, proposes to and is accepted by Mary. The Royds depart.

== Cast ==
- Derek Farr as Denys Royd
- Frank Cellier as Adrian Barrasford
- Marjorie Fielding as Mildred Royd
- George Thorpe as Arthur Royd
- Barbara White as Miranda Bute
- Helen Shingler as Rowena Hyde
- Edward Rigby as Sam Pecker
- Josephine Wilson as Mary Jarrow
- Gwynne Whitby as Marcia Brent
- Ballard Berkeley as Jim Brent
- Judith Furse as Ella Spender
- Pat Field as Sally Spender
- Hélène Burls as Bella
- George Merritt as Police Sergeant
- Christopher Steele as vicar
- Mary Martlew as Elena
- Conway Palmer as Paul Perry
- Richard George as lorry driver
- Brian Weske as Johnnie

== Critical reception ==
The Monthly Film Bulletin wrote: "Unhappily direction and dialogue are both too flat and uninspired to render this film's trivialities humorous or interesting, and the whole thing is quite unreal. The best acting comes from Marjorie Fielding as Mrs. Royd."

Kine Weekly wrote: "Well-mannered and, at the same time, warm and friendly domestic comedy ... There is very little plot, but the interplay of character and gags is both amusing and touching, while the exteriors are charming. Of the family and for the family, it more than lives up to its ready-made box-office reputation."

The Radio Times wrote, "as anyone familiar with Anthony Asquith's classic comedy of manners Quiet Wedding will know, the title of this disappointing sequel is ironic in the extreme. Although also based on an Esther McCracken play, the screenplay lacks the crisp chaos of the original co-written by Terence Rattigan. Consequently, the romantic tangles of Derek Farr and the poaching misadventures of George Thorpe and magistrate Frank Cellier fail to deliver the laughs deserving of such whole-hearted playing."

TV Guide wrote, "another successful adaptation of a popular Esther McCracken play... Funny and well performed".
