= Cry Liberty =

1950 play by Esther McCracken

Cry Liberty is a play by the British writer Esther McCracken. After a premiere at the Theatre Royal, Newcastle, the work's West End at the Vaudeville Theatre lasted for 26 performances from 21 April to 13 May 1950. It was considerably less successful than McCracken's pre-war and wartime hits such as Quiet Wedding and No Medals. The original cast included Irene Handl, Joyce Barbour, Edwin Styles and Anthony Sharp.

== Original cast ==
- Colonel Colin Craven - Edwin Styles
- Geraldine Craven - Judith Tatham
- Martin Woodhouse - Dan Cunningham
- Mr Blott - Michael Godley
- Mr Clements - Michael Gover
- Mr Horder - Ian Jarvis
- Mrs Daggett - Joyce Barbour
- Mrs Horder - Elizabeth Bird
- Mrs Thripp - Irene Handl
- Penelope Woodhouse - Julia Braddock
- Removal Man - Frank Sieman
- Thripp - Douglas Jefferies
- William Hampton - Anthony Sharp

== Bibliography ==
- Wearing, J.P. The London Stage 1950-1959: A Calendar of Productions, Performers, and Personnel. Rowman & Littlefield, 2014.
