= The Chiltern Hundreds =

The Chiltern Hundreds may refer to:

- Chiltern Hundreds, an ancient administrative area in Buckinghamshire, England
  - Crown Steward and Bailiff of the Chiltern Hundreds, a position used as a procedural device to allow resignation from the House of Commons
- The Chiltern Hundreds (play), a 1947 play
  - The Chiltern Hundreds (film), a 1949 film adaptation of the play
