= Gladys Boot =

British actress (1890–1964)

- Born: 28 March 1890; Darlington, County Durham, England
- Died: 16 October 1964 (aged 73–74); Chelsea, London, England
- Occupation: Actress
- Years active: 1940-1963

Gladys Boot (28 March 1890 – 16 October 1964), was a British actress.

She studied acting privately with Elsie Fogerty, and made her stage debut in Newcastle in 1940 in Quiet Wedding; and in London at Wyndham's Theatre the following year in Quiet Weekend. In this, she appeared in over 1,000 performances, including overseas tours and for the forces, 1943–44. After the war, theatre work included as leading lady with the Liverpool Playhouse, and on tour and on Broadway in Yes M'Lord (1949); and again on tour as Mrs Higgins in Shaw's Pygmalion in 1951.

She died on 16 October 1964, in Chelsea, London.

== Selected filmography ==
- Murder Reported (1957) as Dorothy
- Harry Black (1958), as Mrs. Tanner
- Virgin Island (1958), as Mrs. Carruthers
- Your Money or Your Wife (1960), as Mrs. Compton Chamberlain
