= Living Room (1943 play) =

1943 play by Esther McCracken

Living Room is a play by the British writer Esther McCracken. The play's original West End run at the Garrick Theatre lasted for 142 performances between 9 June and 9 October 1943, after a premiere at Richmond Theatre under the working title White Elephants. Its plot concerns slum clearance and the effect it has on various people. The original cast included Lloyd Pearson, Fred Groves, Louise Hampton and Jane Baxter.

McCracken followed it the next year with one of her biggest hits No Medals. Both plays tackled more serious subjects than the light comedies she had made her name with.

== Bibliography ==
- Wearing, J.P. The London Stage 1940-1949: A Calendar of Productions, Performers, and Personnel. Rowman & Littlefield, 2014.
