= Raymond Burr =

Canadian actor (1917–1993)

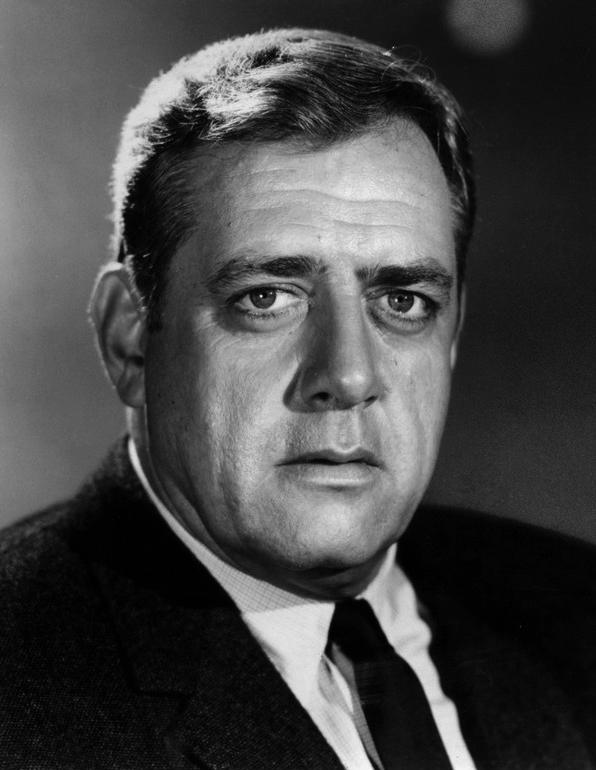
- Burr in 1968
- Born: Raymond William Stacy Burr; May 21, 1917; New Westminster, British Columbia, Canada
- Died: September 12, 1993 (aged 76); Healdsburg, California, U.S.
- Resting place: Fraser Cemetery
- Occupation: Actor
- Years active: 1934–1993
- Spouse: Isabella Ward (m. 1948; div. 1952)
- Partner: Robert Benevides (1960–1993)

Raymond William Stacy Burr (May 21, 1917 – September 12, 1993) was a Canadian actor who had a lengthy Hollywood film career and portrayed the title roles in the television dramas Perry Mason and Ironside.

Burr's early acting career included roles on Broadway, radio, television, and film, usually as the villain. He portrayed the suspected murderer in the Alfred Hitchcock thriller Rear Window (1954), and he also had a role in the 1956 film Godzilla, King of the Monsters!, which he reprised in the 1985 film Godzilla 1985. He won Emmy Awards for acting in 1959 and 1961 for the role of Perry Mason, which he played for nine seasons (1957–1966) and reprised in a series of 26 Perry Mason TV movies (1985–1993). His second TV series, Ironside, earned him six Emmy and two Golden Globe nominations.

Burr died from liver cancer in 1993, and his personal life came into question, as many details of his biography appeared to be unverifiable.

== Early life ==
Raymond William Stacy Burr was born May 21, 1917, in New Westminster, British Columbia. His father, William Johnston Burr (1889–1985), was a hardware salesman; his mother, Minerva Annette (née Smith, 1892–1974), was a pianist and music teacher.

When Burr was six, his parents divorced. He moved to Vallejo, California, with his mother and younger siblings Geraldine and James, while his father remained in New Westminster. Burr briefly attended San Rafael Military Academy in San Rafael, California, and graduated from Berkeley High School.

In 1986, he told journalist Jane Ardmore that, when he was 12 years old, his mother sent him to New Mexico for a year to work as a ranch hand. According to Burr's story, he was already his full adult height and rather large and "had fallen in with a group of college-aged kids who didn't realize how young Raymond was, and they let him tag along with them in activities and situations far too sophisticated for him to handle." In the same article, Burr also stated he developed a passion for growing things and joined the Civilian Conservation Corps for a year in his teens. He made his stage debut at age 12 in a Vancouver stock company, and did some acting in his teens. The experiences Burr described when he was the age of 12 (working in radio in San Francisco, spending a year in New Mexico, appearing in Vancouver theatre, working for the Civilian Conservation Corps) are sometimes mutually contradictory; this would be a pattern that would recur in Burr's autobiographical reminiscences about his pre-Perry Mason personal life.

== Acting career ==
=== Theatre ===
Burr grew up during the Great Depression and hoped to study acting at the Pasadena Playhouse, but he was unable to afford the tuition. By his own account, in 1934 he joined a repertory theatre company in Toronto that toured throughout Canada, then joined another company that toured India, Australia, and England. He briefly attended Long Beach Junior College and taught for a semester at San Jose Junior College, working nights as a radio actor and singer. Burr began his association with the Pasadena Playhouse in 1937.

Burr moved to New York in 1940 and made his first Broadway appearance in Crazy With the Heat, a two-act musical revue produced by Kurt Kasznar. Despite the veteran cast of stars Willie Howard, Luella Gear, and Gracie Barrie, the show folded after three months. Burr's first starring role on the stage came in November 1942 when he was an emergency replacement in a Pasadena Playhouse production of Quiet Wedding. He became a member of the Pasadena Playhouse drama faculty for 18 months, and he performed in some 30 plays over the years. He returned to Broadway for Patrick Hamilton's The Duke in Darkness (1944), a psychological drama set during the French Wars of Religion. His performance as the loyal friend of the imprisoned protagonist led to a contract with RKO Radio Pictures. In 1944, he performed in multiple plays during his summer residency at Elitch Gardens Theater in Denver Colorado.

=== Film ===
Lars Thorwald realizes that he is being watched across the courtyard by telephoto lens in Alfred Hitchcock's Rear Window (1954), which offered Burr his most notable film role.

Burr appeared in more than 50 feature films between 1946 and 1957, creating an array of villains that established him as an icon of film noir. Film historian Alain Silver concluded that Burr's most significant work in the genre is in ten films: Desperate (1947), Sleep, My Love (1948), Raw Deal (1948), Pitfall (1948), Abandoned (1949), Red Light (1949), M (1951), His Kind of Woman (1951), The Blue Gardenia (1953), and Crime of Passion (1957). Silver described Burr's private detective in Pitfall as "both reprehensible and pathetic," a characterization also cited by film historian Richard Schickel as a prototype of film noir, in contrast with the appealing television characters for which Burr later became famous. "He tried to make you see the psychosis below the surface, even when the parts weren't huge," said film historian James Ursini. "He was able to bring such complexity and different levels to those characters, and create sympathy for his characters even though they were doing reprehensible things."

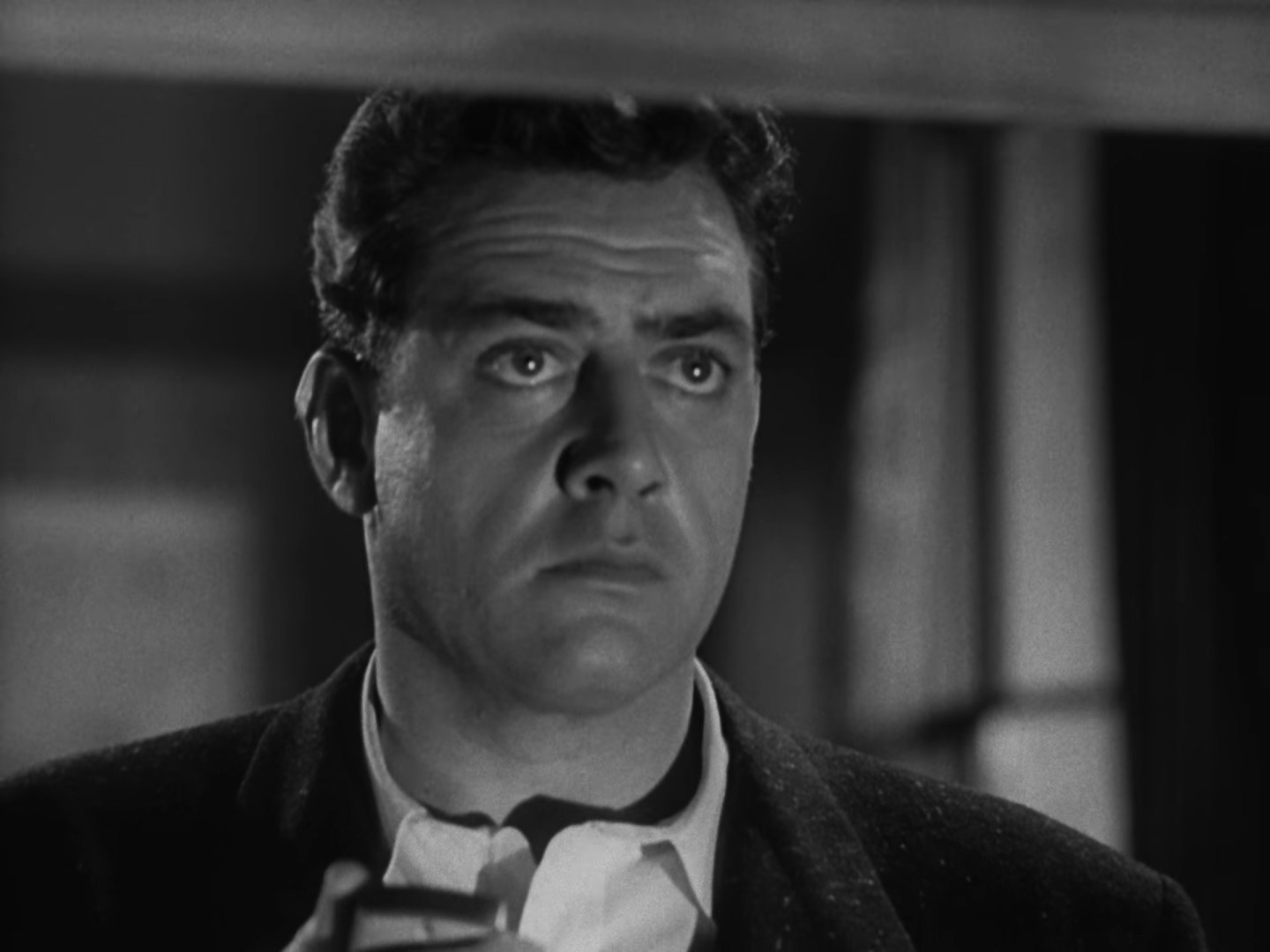
Burr in Godzilla, King of the Monsters! (1956)

Other titles in Burr's film noir legacy include Walk a Crooked Mile (1948), Borderline (1950), Unmasked (1950), The Whip Hand (1951), FBI Girl (1951), Meet Danny Wilson (1952), Rear Window (1954), They Were So Young (1954), A Cry in the Night (1956), and Affair in Havana (1957). His villains were also seen in Westerns, period dramas, horror films, and adventure films.

"I was just a fat heavy," Burr told journalist James Bawden. "I split the heavy parts with Bill Conrad. We were both in our twenties playing much older men. I never got the girl but I once got the gorilla in a 3-D picture called Gorilla at Large. I menaced Claudette Colbert, Lizabeth Scott, Paulette Goddard, Anne Baxter, Barbara Stanwyck. Those girls would take one look at me and scream and can you blame them? I was drowned, beaten, stabbed and all for my art. But I knew I was horribly overweight. I lacked any kind of self esteem. At 25 I was playing the fathers of people older than me."

Burr's occasional roles on the right side of the law include the aggressive prosecutor in A Place in the Sun (1951). His courtroom performance in that film made an impression on Gail Patrick and her husband Cornwell Jackson, who had Burr in mind when they began casting the role of Los Angeles district attorney Hamilton Burger in the CBS-TV series Perry Mason.

=== Radio ===
By the age of 12, Burr was appearing in national radio dramas broadcasting in nearby San Francisco.

As a young man Burr weighed more than 300 pounds (140 kg), which limited his on-screen roles. "But in radio this presented no problems, given the magnificent quality of his voice", reported The Globe and Mail. "He played romantic leads and menacing villains with equal authority, and he earned a steady and comfortable income."

Working steadily in radio since the 1940s, often uncredited, Burr was a leading player on the West Coast. He had a regular role in Jack Webb's first radio show, Pat Novak for Hire (1949), and in Dragnet (1949–50) he played Joe Friday's boss, Ed Backstrand, chief of detectives. Burr worked on other Los Angeles-based series including Suspense, Screen Directors Playhouse, Yours Truly, Johnny Dollar, Family Theater, Hallmark Playhouse and Hallmark Hall of Fame. He performed in five episodes of the experimental dramatic radio anthology series CBS Radio Workshop, and had what is arguably his best radio role in "The Silent Witness" (1957), in which his is the only voice.

From March 1951 through June 1952 Burr used the name of Ray Hartman approximately 30 times when appearing on radio, mostly on Dangerous Assignment, The Lineup and Yours Truly, Johnny Dollar. This was verified by perusing the scripts for both series.

In 1956, Burr was the star of CBS Radio's Fort Laramie, an adult Western drama produced, written and directed by the creators of Gunsmoke. He played the role of Lee Quince, captain of the cavalry, in the series set at a post-Civil War military post where disease, boredom, the elements and the uncharted terrain were the greatest enemies of "ordinary men who lived in extraordinary times". The half-hour transcribed program aired Sundays at 5:30 pm. ET January 22 – October 28, 1956. Burr told columnist Sheilah Graham that he had received 1,500 fan letters after the first broadcasts, and he continued to receive letters praising the show's authenticity and presentation of human dignity.

In August 1956, CBS announced that Burr would star in the television series Perry Mason. Although the network wanted Burr to continue work on Fort Laramie as well, the TV series required an extraordinary commitment and the radio show ended.

Known for his loyalty and consciousness of history, Burr went out of his way to employ his radio colleagues in his television programs. Some 180 radio celebrities appeared on Perry Mason during the first season alone.

=== Television ===
Burr emerged as a prolific television character actor in the 1950s. He made his television debut in 1951, appearing in episodes of Stars Over Hollywood, The Bigelow Theatre, Family Theater and the debut episode of Dragnet. He went on to appear in such programs as Gruen Playhouse, Four Star Playhouse, Ford Theatre, Lux Video Theatre, Mr. and Mrs. North, Schlitz Playhouse of Stars and Playhouse 90.

=== Perry Mason ===
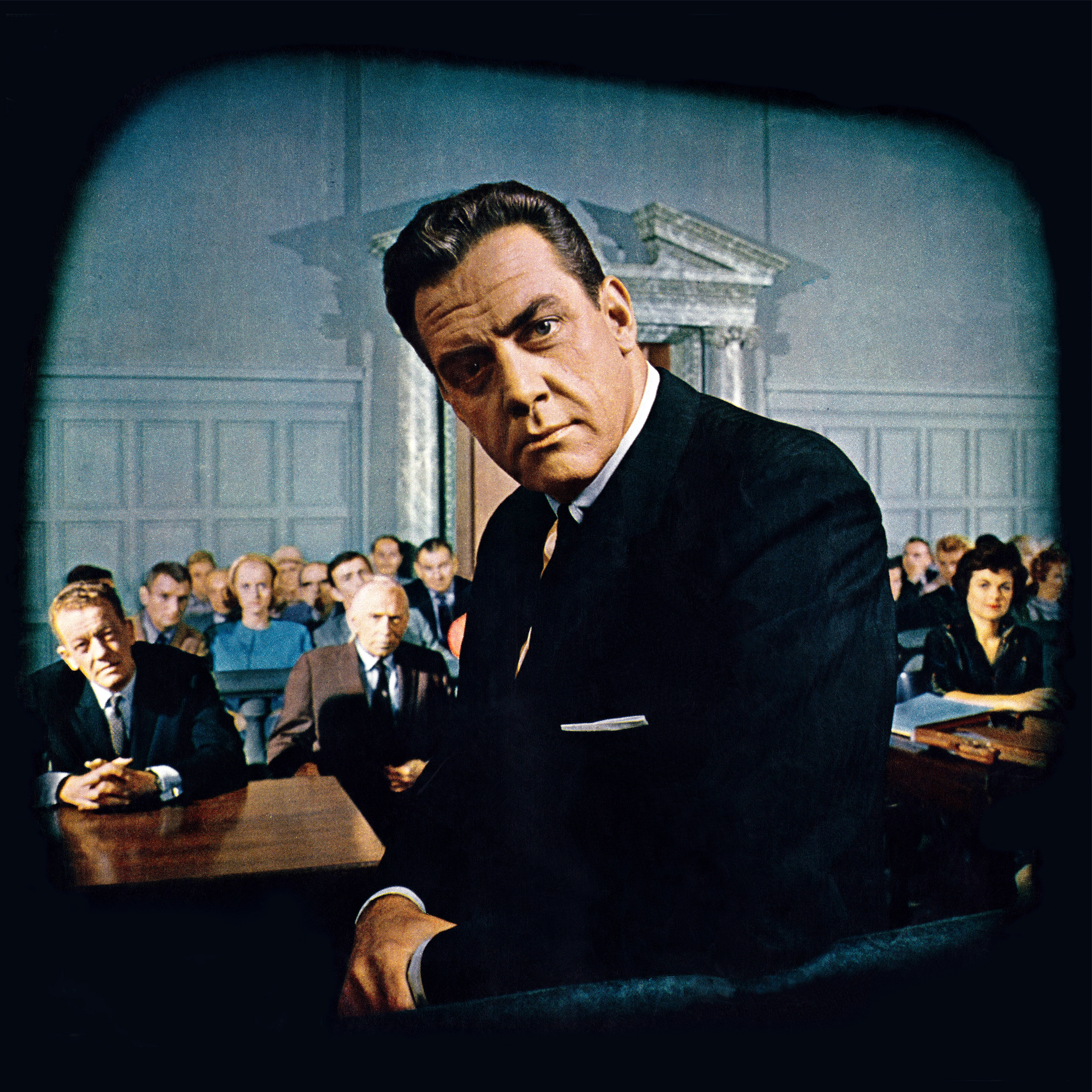
Raymond Burr and (front row, from left) William Talman, Ray Collins and Barbara Hale on the set of Perry Mason, from the front cover of Look magazine (October 10, 1961)

In 1956, Burr auditioned for Perry Mason, a new CBS-TV courtroom drama based on the highly successful novels by Erle Stanley Gardner. Efrem Zimbalist, Jr. had already been tentatively cast as Perry Mason. Burr told associate producer Sam White, "If you don't like me as Perry Mason, then I'll go along and play the part of the district attorney, Hamilton Burger." Executive producer Gail Patrick Jackson had been impressed with Burr's courtroom performance in A Place in the Sun (1951), and she told Burr that he was perfect for Perry Mason but at least 60 pounds (27 kg; 4.3 st) overweight. He went on a crash diet over the following month; he then tested as Perry Mason and was cast in the role. While Burr's test was running, Gardner reportedly stood up, pointed at the screen, and said, "That's Perry Mason." William Hopper also auditioned as Mason, but he was cast instead as private detective Paul Drake. The series also starred Barbara Hale as Della Street, Mason's secretary, William Talman as Hamilton Burger, the district attorney who loses nearly every case to Mason, and Ray Collins as homicide detective Lieutenant Arthur Tragg.

The series ran from 1957 to 1966 and made Burr a star. In the early 1960s, the show had 30 million viewers every Saturday night and Burr received 3,000 fan letters a week. Burr received three consecutive Emmy Award nominations and won the award in 1959 and 1961 for his performance as Perry Mason. The series has been rerun in syndication ever since, and was released on DVD between 2006 and 2013. Burr's character is often said never to have lost a case, although he did lose two murder cases off-screen in early episodes of the series.

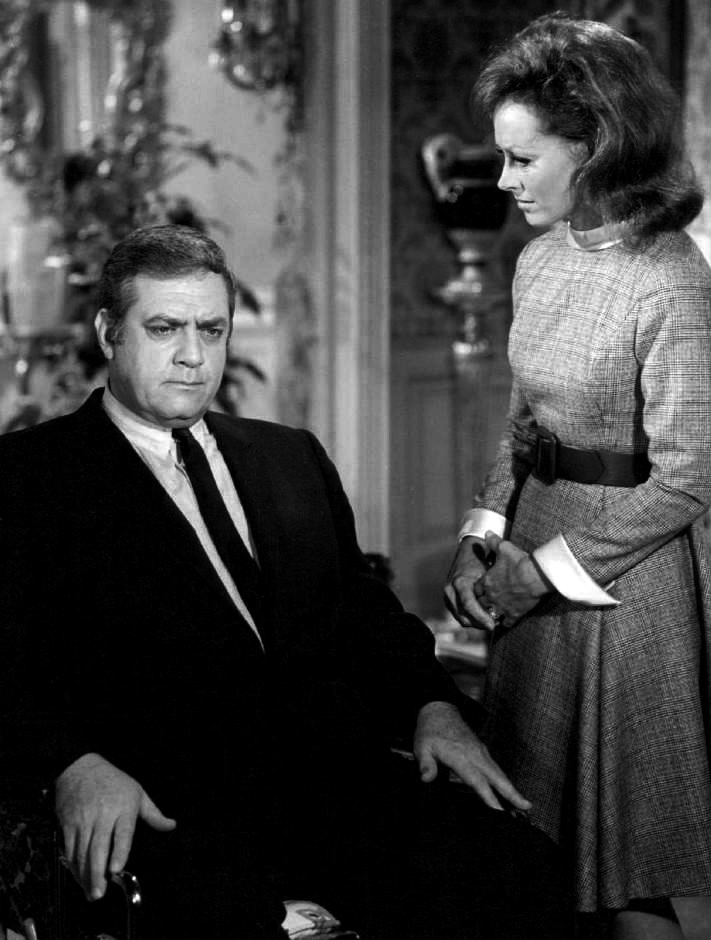
Burr and Victoria Shaw in Ironside (1969)

=== Ironside ===
Burr moved from CBS to Universal Studios, where he played the title role in the television drama Ironside, which ran on NBC from 1967 to 1975. In the pilot episode, San Francisco Chief of Detectives Robert T. Ironside is paralyzed by a sniper during an attempt on his life and, after his recovery, uses a wheelchair for mobility, in the first crime drama show to star a policeman with a disability. The show earned Burr six Emmy nominations—one for the pilot and five for his work in the series—and two Golden Globe nominations.

=== Other series ===
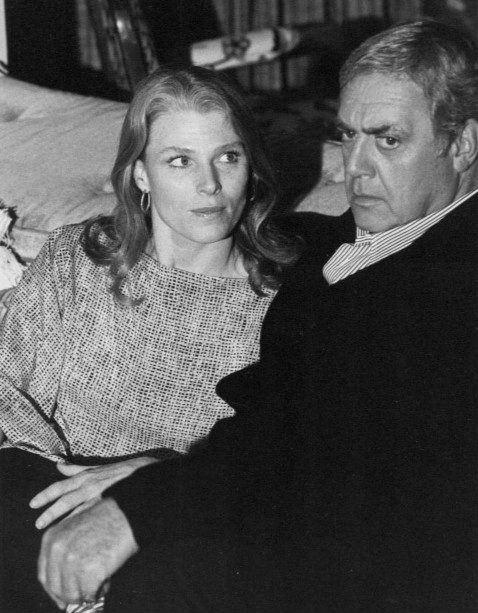
Mariette Hartley and Burr in Kingston: Confidential (1977)

After Ironside went off the air, NBC failed in two attempts to launch Burr as the star of a new series. In a two-hour television movie format, Mallory: Circumstantial Evidence aired in February 1976 with Burr again in the role of the lawyer who outwits the district attorney. Despite good reviews for Burr, the critical reception was poor, and NBC decided against developing it into a series.

In 1977, Burr starred in the short-lived TV series Kingston: Confidential as R.B. Kingston, a publishing magnate similar to William Randolph Hearst, owner of numerous newspapers and TV stations, who, in his spare time, solved crimes along with a group of employees. It was a critical failure that was scheduled opposite the extraordinarily popular Charlie's Angels. It was cancelled after 13 weeks.

Burr took on a shorter project next, playing an underworld boss in a six-hour miniseries, 79 Park Avenue.

One last attempt to launch a series followed on CBS. The two-hour premiere of The Jordan Chance aroused little interest.

On January 20, 1987, Burr hosted the television special that later served as the pilot for the long-running series Unsolved Mysteries.

=== Television films ===
In 1985, Burr was approached by producers Dean Hargrove and Fred Silverman to star in a made-for-TV movie, Perry Mason Returns. The same week, Burr recalled, he was asked to reprise the role he played in Godzilla, King of the Monsters! (1956), in a low-budget film that would be titled Godzilla 1985.

"When they asked me to do it a second time, I said, 'Certainly,' and everybody thought I was out of my mind," Burr told Tom Shales of The Washington Post. "But it wasn't the large sum of money. It was the fact that, first of all, I kind of liked 'Godzilla,' and where do you get the opportunity to play yourself 30 years later? So I said yes to both of them." Although Burr is best remembered for his role as Perry Mason, a devoted following continues to appreciate him as the actor that brought the Godzilla series to America.

He agreed to appear in the Mason movie if Barbara Hale returned to reprise her role as Della Street. Hale agreed, and when Perry Mason Returns aired in December 1985, her character became the defendant. The rest of the principal cast had died, but Hale's real-life son William Katt played the role of Paul Drake Jr. The movie was so successful that Burr made a total of 26 Perry Mason television movies before his death. Many were filmed in and around Denver, Colorado.

After several of the TV movies, Burr's age and health issues forced him to use a cane onscreen, which was jokingly explained as a "skiing accident". By 1993, when Burr signed with NBC for another season of Mason films, he was using a wheelchair full-time because of his failing health. In his final Perry Mason movie, The Case of the Killer Kiss, he was shown either sitting or standing while leaning on a table, but only once standing unsupported for a few seconds. Twelve more Mason movies were scheduled before Burr's death, including one scheduled to film the month he died.

As he had with the Perry Mason TV movies, Burr decided to do an Ironside reunion movie. The Return of Ironside aired in May 1993, reuniting the entire original cast of the 1967–75 series. Like many of the Mason movies, it was set and filmed in Denver.

== Personal life ==
=== Physical characteristics ===
Burr said that he weighed 12.75 pounds (5.8 kg) at birth, and was chubby throughout his childhood. "When you're a little fat boy in public school, or any kind of school, you're just persecuted something awful," he said. His weight was always an issue for him in getting roles, and it became a public relations problem when Johnny Carson began making jokes about him during his Tonight Show monologues. Burr refused to appear as Carson's guest from then on, and told Us Weekly years later: "I have been asked a number of times to do his show and I won't do it. Because I like NBC. He's doing an NBC show. If I went on I'd have some things to say, not just about the bad jokes he's done about me, but bad jokes he does about everybody who can't fight back because they aren't there. And that wouldn't be good for NBC."

=== Family life ===
Burr married actress Isabella Ward (1919–2004) on January 10, 1948. They met in 1943 while she was a student at the Pasadena Playhouse where Burr was teaching. They met again in 1947 when she was in California with a theater company. They were married shortly before Burr began work on the 1948 film noir Pitfall. In May 1948, they appeared on stage together in a Pasadena Playhouse production based on the life of Paul Gauguin. They lived in the basement apartment of a large house in Hollywood that Burr shared with his mother and grandparents. The marriage ended within months, and Ward returned to her native Delaware. They divorced in 1952, and neither remarried.

In 1960, Burr met actor Robert Benevides on the set of Perry Mason. Benevides gave up acting in 1963, and became a production consultant for 21 of the Perry Mason TV movies. They owned and operated an orchid business and then a vineyard in California's Dry Creek Valley. They were domestic partners until Burr's death in 1993. Burr bequeathed his entire estate to Benevides, and Benevides renamed the Dry Creek property Raymond Burr Vineyards (reportedly against Burr's wishes) and managed it as a commercial enterprise. In 2017, the property was sold.

Although Burr had not revealed that he was homosexual during his lifetime, it was reported in the press upon his death.

=== Biographical contradictions ===
At various times in his career, Burr and his managers and publicists offered spurious or unverifiable biographical details to the press and public. Burr's obituary in The New York Times states that he entered the U.S. Navy in 1944, after The Duke in Darkness, and left in 1946, weighing almost 350 pounds (160 kg). Although Burr may have served in the Coast Guard, reports of his service in the U.S. Navy are false, as apparently are his statements that he sustained battle injuries at Okinawa. (Note: In response to an inquiry by biographer Michael Starr, the National Personnel Records Center wrote that after an extensive search "we have been unable to locate any information that would help us verify this veteran's service.")

Other false biographical details include years of college education at a variety of institutions, being widowed twice, a son who died young, world travel, and success in high school athletics. Most of these claims were apparently accepted as fact by the press during Burr's lifetime, up until his death and by his first biographer, Ona Hill. (Note: Burr said that he never attended high school, but took courses at Long Beach Junior College, Stanford, and the University of California, Berkeley.)

Burr reportedly was married at the beginning of World War II to an actress named Annette Sutherland—killed, Burr said, in the same 1943 plane crash that claimed the life of actor Leslie Howard. However, multiple sources have reported that no one by that name appears on any of the published passenger manifests from the flight. A son supposedly born during this marriage, Michael Evan, was said to have died of leukemia in 1953 at the age of ten. Another marriage purportedly took place in the early 1950s to a Laura Andrina Morgan—who died of cancer, Burr said, in 1955. Yet no evidence exists of either marriage, nor of a son's birth, other than Burr's own claims. As late as 1991, Burr stood by the account of this son's life and death. He told Parade that when he realized Michael was dying, he took him on a one-year tour of the United States. "Before my boy left, before his time was gone," he said, "I wanted him to see the beauty of his country and its people." After Burr's death, his publicist confirmed that Burr worked steadily in Hollywood throughout 1952, the year that he was supposedly touring the country with his son.

In the late 1950s, Burr was rumored to be romantically involved with the much younger Natalie Wood. Wood's agent sent her on such public dates so she could be noticed by directors and producers, and so the men she dated could present themselves in public as heterosexuals. The dates also helped to disguise Wood's relationship with Robert Wagner, whom she later married. Burr reportedly resented Warner Bros.' decision to promote her attachment to another gay actor, Tab Hunter, rather than him. Robert Benevides later said, "He was a little bitter about it. He was really in love with her, I guess." (Note: Someone who worked on the set with Burr and Wood thought they had a certain chemistry, but later said, "I think everybody knew about his sexual preferences, but that was just something that was in the motion picture business.")

Later accounts of Burr's life say that he hid his homosexuality to protect his career. "That was a time in Hollywood history when homosexuality was not countenanced", Associated Press reporter Bob Thomas recalled in a 2000 episode of Biography. "Ray was not a romantic star by any means, but he was a very popular figure ... If it was revealed at that time in Hollywood history it would have been very difficult for him to continue." (Note: Hedda Hopper received information from an informant in 1963 and wrote to Burr, "Dear Ray, What the hell did you do in Phoenix? If the enclosed letter is correct, this is the first intimation I've had of it." She did not repeat the enclosure's charges, but reassured Burr that if trouble developed, he need only "call on the mother of Paul Drake and I will stand up and swear anything for you". Her son, William Hopper, had played detective Paul Drake on Perry Mason.)

Arthur Marks, a producer of Perry Mason, recalled Burr's talk of wives and children: "I know he was just putting on a show. ... That was my gut feeling. I think the wives and the loving women, the Natalie Wood thing, were a bit of a cover." Dean Hargrove, executive producer of the Perry Mason TV films, said in 2006, "I had always assumed that Raymond was gay, because he had a relationship with Robert Benevides for a very long time. Whether or not he had relationships with women, I had no idea. I did know that I had trouble keeping track of whether he was married or not in these stories. Raymond had the ability to mythologize himself, to some extent, and some of his stories about his past ... tended to grow as time went by."

=== Hobbies and businesses ===
Burr had many hobbies over the course of his life: cultivating orchids and collecting wine, art, stamps, and seashells. He was very fond of cooking. He was interested in flying, sailing, and fishing. According to A&E Biography, Burr was an avid reader with a retentive memory. He was also among the earliest importers and breeders of Portuguese Water Dogs in the United States.

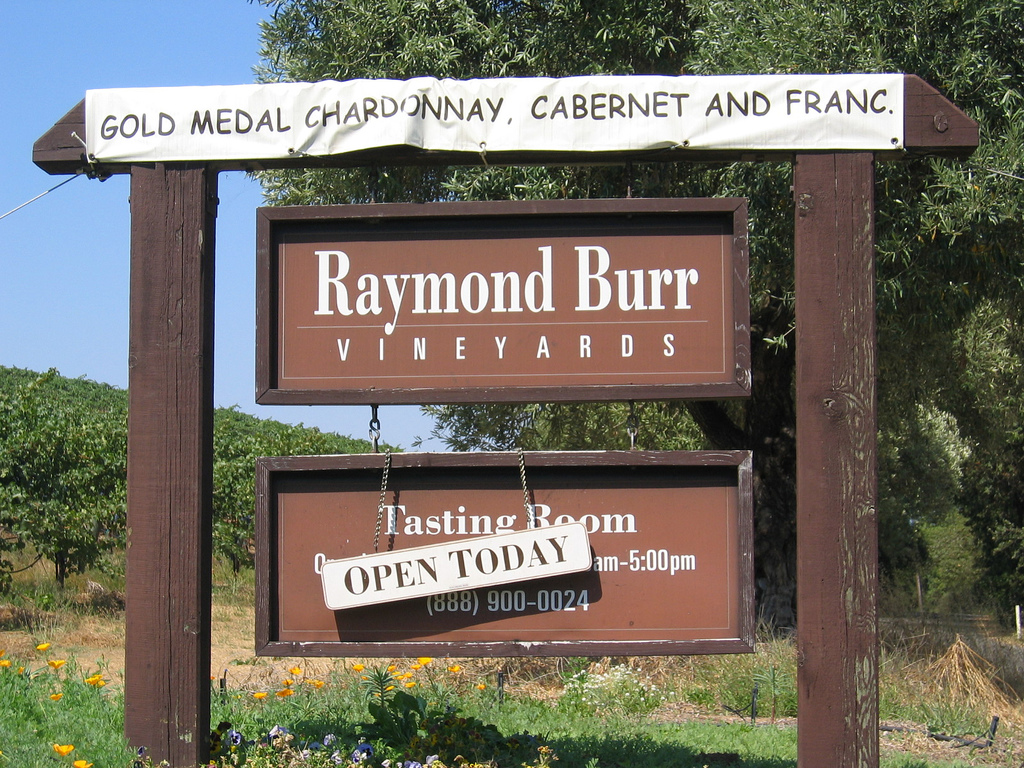
Raymond Burr Vineyards

Burr developed his interest in cultivating and hybridizing orchids into a business with Benevides. Over 20 years, their company, Sea God Nurseries, had nurseries in Fiji, Hawaii, the Azores, and California, and was responsible for adding more than 1,500 new orchids to the worldwide catalog. Burr named one of them the "Barbara Hale Orchid" after his Perry Mason costar. Burr and Benevides cultivated Cabernet Sauvignon, Chardonnay, and grapes for Port wine, as well as orchids, at Burr's farm/estate in Sonoma County, California.

In 1965, Burr purchased Naitauba, a 4,000-acre (16 km^{2}) island in Fiji, rich in seashells. There, he and Benevides oversaw the raising of copra (coconut meat) and cattle, as well as orchids. Burr planned to retire there permanently. However, medical problems made that impossible and he sold the property in 1983.

=== Philanthropy ===
Burr was a well-known philanthropist. He gave enormous sums of money, including his salaries from the Perry Mason movies, to charity. He was also known for sharing his wealth with friends. He sponsored 26 foster children through the Foster Parents' Plan or Save the Children, many with the greatest medical needs. He gave money and some of his Perry Mason scripts to the McGeorge School of Law in Sacramento, California.

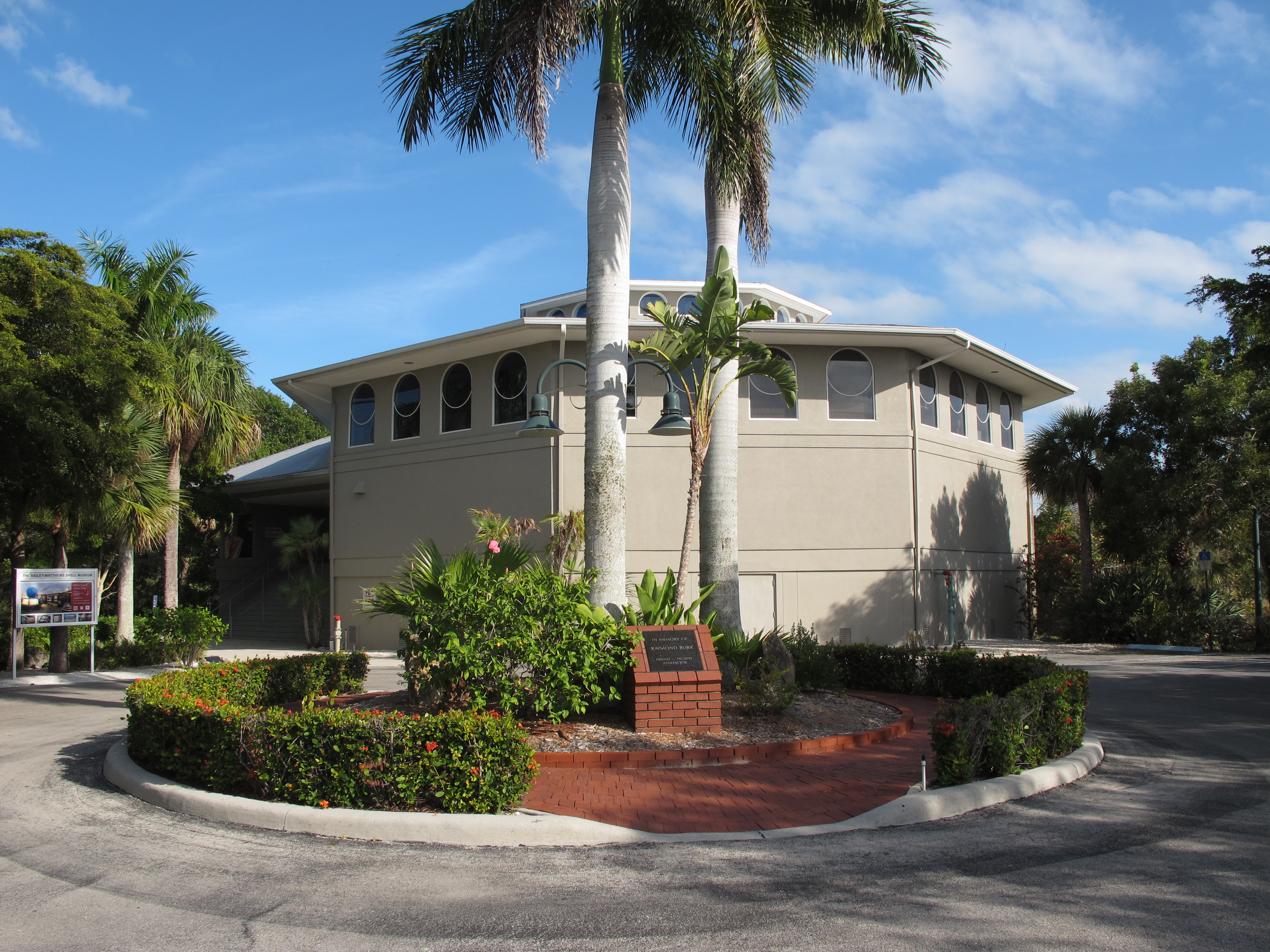
A view of the Bailey-Matthews National Shell Museum in Sanibel, Florida, with the Raymond Burr Memorial Garden in the foreground, December 2011

Burr was an early supporter of the Bailey-Matthews National Shell Museum in Sanibel, Florida, raising funds and chairing its first capital campaign. He also donated to the museum a large collection of Fijian cowries and cones from his island in Fiji.

In 1993, Sonoma State University awarded Burr an honorary doctorate. He supported medical and educational institutions in Denver, and in 1993, the University of Colorado awarded him an honorary doctorate for his acting work. Burr also founded and financed the American Fijian Foundation that funded academic research, including efforts to develop a dictionary of the language.

Burr made repeated trips on behalf of the United Service Organizations (USO). He toured both Korea and Vietnam during wartime and once spent six months touring Korea, Japan, and the Philippines. He sometimes organized his own troupe and toured bases both in the U.S. and overseas, often small installations that the USO did not serve, like one tour of Greenland, Baffin Island, Newfoundland and Labrador. Returning from Vietnam in 1965, he made a speaking tour of the U.S. to advocate an intensified war effort. As the war became more controversial, he modified his tone, called for more attention to the sacrifice of the troops, and said, "My only position on the war is that I wish it were over." In October 1967, NBC aired Raymond Burr Visits Vietnam, a documentary of one of his visits. The reception was mixed. "The impressions he came up with are neither weighty nor particularly revealing", wrote the Chicago Tribune; the Los Angeles Times said Burr's questions were "intelligent and elicited some interesting replies".

Burr had a reputation in Hollywood as a thoughtful, generous man years before much of his more-visible philanthropic work. In 1960, Ray Collins, who portrayed Lt. Arthur Tragg on the original Perry Mason series, and who was by that time often ill and unable to remember all the lines he was supposed to speak, stated, "There is nothing but kindness from our star, Ray Burr. Part of his life is dedicated to us, and that's no bull. If there's anything the matter with any of us, he comes around before anyone else and does what he can to help. He's a great star—in the old tradition."

=== Illness and death ===
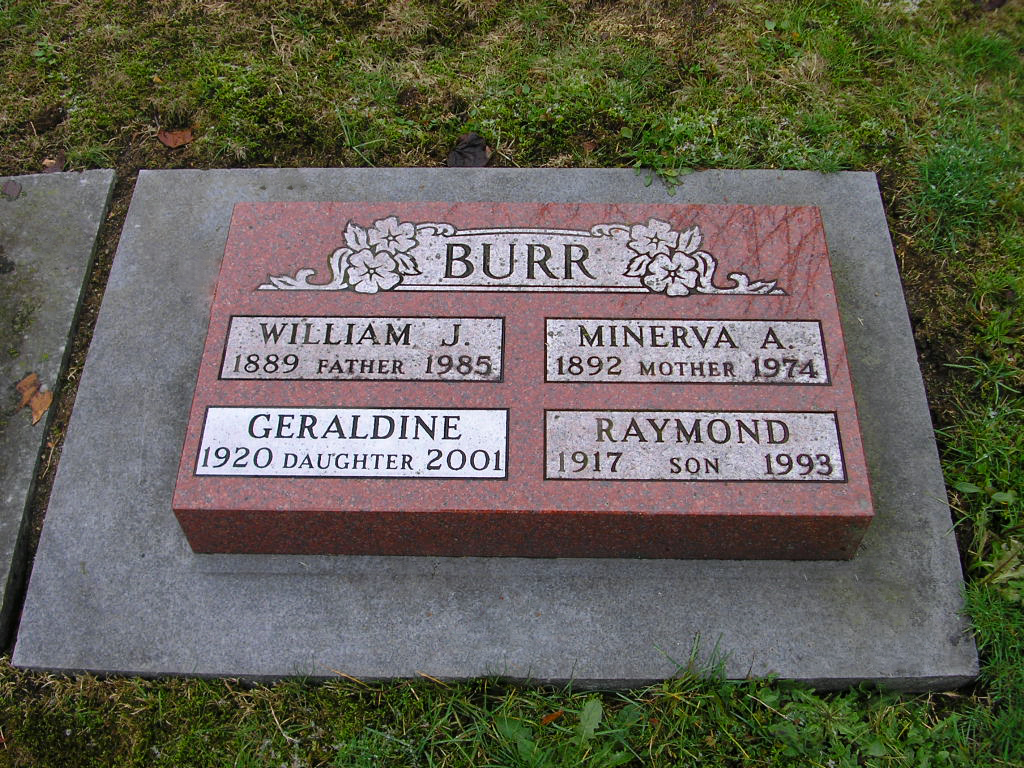
Raymond Burr's grave marker with his family in New Westminster, Canada.

During the filming of his last Perry Mason movie in the spring of 1993, Burr became ill. A Viacom spokesman told the media that the illness might have been related to the renal cell carcinoma (malignant kidney tumour) that had been removed from Burr that February. It was later determined that the cancer had spread to his liver and was, by that point inoperable. Burr held several "goodbye parties" before his death on September 12, 1993, at his Sonoma County ranch near Healdsburg. He was 76 years old.

The day after Burr's death, American Bar Association President R. William Ide III released a statement: "Raymond Burr's portrayals of Perry Mason represented lawyers in a professional and dignified manner. ... Mr. Burr strove for such authenticity in his courtroom characterizations that we regard his passing as though we lost one of our own." The New York Times reported that Perry Mason had been named second—after F. Lee Bailey, and before Abraham Lincoln, Thurgood Marshall, Janet Reno, Ben Matlock and Hillary Clinton—in a 1993 National Law Journal poll that asked Americans to name the attorney, fictional or not, they most admired.

Burr was interred with his parents and sister Geraldine (1920-2001) at Fraser Cemetery, New Westminster, British Columbia. On October 1, about 600 family members and friends paid tribute to Burr at a private memorial service at the Pasadena Playhouse.

Burr bequeathed his estate to Robert Benevides, and excluded all relatives, including a sister, nieces, and nephews. His will was challenged, without success, by two of the ten children of his late brother, James E. Burr. Benevides' attorney said that tabloid reports of an estate worth $32 million were an overestimate.

== Accolades ==
For his work in the TV series Perry Mason, Burr received the Emmy Award for Best Actor in a Leading Role (Continuing Character) in a Dramatic Series at the 11th Primetime Emmy Awards in 1959. Nominated again in 1960, he received his second Emmy Award for Outstanding Performance by an Actor in a Series (Lead) at the 13th Primetime Emmy Awards in 1961. Burr was named Favorite Male Performer, for Perry Mason, in TV Guide magazine's inaugural TV Guide Award readers poll in 1960. He also received the second annual award in 1961.

In 1960, Burr was awarded a star on the Hollywood Walk of Fame at 6656 Hollywood Boulevard. Burr received six Emmy nominations (1968–72) for his work in the TV series Ironside. He was nominated twice, in 1969 and 1972, for the Golden Globe Award for Best Actor – Television Series Drama. A benefactor of legal education, Burr was principal speaker at the founders' banquet of the Thomas M. Cooley Law School in Lansing, Michigan, in June 1973. The Raymond Burr Award for Excellence in Criminal Law was established in his honor.

Burr was ranked No. 44 on TV Guide's 50 Greatest TV Stars of All Time in 1996. Completed in 1996, a circular garden at the entrance to the Bailey-Matthews National Shell Museum in Sanibel, Florida, honored Burr for his role in establishing the museum. Burr was a trustee and an early supporter who chaired the museum's first capital campaign, and made direct contributions from his own shell collection. A display about Burr as an actor, benefactor and collector opened in the museum's Great Hall of Shells in 2012.

From 2000 to 2006, the Raymond Burr Performing Arts Society leased the historic Columbia Theatre from the city of New Westminster, and renamed it the Raymond Burr Performing Arts Centre. Although the nonprofit organization hoped to raise funds to renovate and expand the venue, its contract was not renewed. The group was a failed bidder when the theater was sold in 2011.

In 2008, Canada Post issued a postage stamp in its "Canadians in Hollywood" series featuring Burr. Burr received the 2009 Canadian Legends Award and a star on Canada's Walk of Fame in Toronto. The induction ceremony was held on September 12, 2009. A 2014 article in The Atlantic that examined how Netflix categorized nearly 77,000 different personalized genres found that Burr was rated as the favorite actor by Netflix users, with the greatest number of dedicated microgenres.

== Acting credits ==
=== Theatre ===
Date	Title	Role	Notes
December 26, 1940	Crazy With the Heat		Boston
January 14–18, 1941	Crazy With the Heat		44th Street Theatre, New York City
November 11–22, 1942	Quiet Wedding	Dallas Chaytor	Pasadena Playhouse, directed by Lenore Shanewise
December 23, 1942 – January 3, 1943	Charley's Aunt		Pasadena Playhouse
February – February 21, 1943	Arsenic and Old Lace	Jonathan Brewster	Pasadena Playhouse
March–April 1943	Jason	Mike Ambler	Pasadena Playhouse, directed by Onslow Stevens
July 1943	The Intimate Strangers	Mr. Ames	Pasadena Playhouse, directed by Lenore Shanewise
July–August 1943	Monsieur Beaucaire		Pasadena Playhouse
January 24 – February 12, 1944	The Duke in Darkness	Voulain	Playhouse Theatre, New York City
May - August 1944	Multiple productions	Various	Elitch Gardens Theater, Denver, Colorado, Additional Citation:
June 12–23, 1946	While the Sun Shines		Pasadena Playhouse
December 1, 1946 –	Murder Without Crime		Pasadena Playhouse, directed by Raymond Burr (also actor)
January 21 – February 15, 1947	Miss Julie	Jean	Forrest Theatre, Philadelphia; Plymouth Theatre, Boston; Shubert Theatre, New Haven, Connecticut
May 26, 1948 –	Gauguin	Paul Gauguin	Pasadena Playhouse, directed by Catherine Turney
June 11 – July 15, 1962	Critic's Choice		Suburbs of Detroit and Chicago
1983	Underground		Tour including Royal Alexandra Theatre, Toronto, Theatre Royal, York and Prince of Wales Theatre, London

=== Film ===
Year	Title	Role	Notes
1940	Earl of Puddlestone	Mrs. Millicent Potter's chauffeur	Uncredited
1946	Without Reservations	Paul Gill	Uncredited
1946	San Quentin	Jeff Torrance	
1947	Code of the West	Boyd Carter	
1947	Desperate	Walt Radak	
1948	I Love Trouble	Herb	
1948	Sleep, My Love	Sgt. Strake	
1948	Ruthless	Peter Vendig	
1948	Fighting Father Dunne	Prosecuting attorney	Uncredited
1948	Raw Deal	Rick Coyle	
1948	Pitfall	J. B. MacDonald	
1948	Station West	Mark Bristow	
1948	Walk a Crooked Mile	Krebs	
1948	Adventures of Don Juan	Captain Alvarez	
1949	Bride of Vengeance	Michelotto	
1949	Black Magic	Dumas, Jr.	
1949	Red Light	Nick Cherney	
1949	Abandoned	Kerric	
1949	Love Happy	Alphonse Zoto	
1950	Unmasked	Roger Lewis	
1950	Key to the City	Les Taggart	
1950	Borderline	Pete Richie	
1951	M	Pottsy	
1951	A Place in the Sun	District Attorney R. Frank Marlowe	
1951	New Mexico	Pvt. Anderson	
1951	His Kind of Woman	Nick Ferraro	
1951	The Whip Hand	Steve Loomis	
1951	Bride of the Gorilla	Barney Chavez	
1951	The Magic Carpet	Grand Vizier Boreg al Buzzar	
1951	FBI Girl	Blake	
1952	Meet Danny Wilson	Nick Driscoll	
1952	Mara Maru	Brock Benedict	
1952	Horizons West	Cord Hardin	
1953	The Bandits of Corsica	Baron Cesare Jonatto	
1953	The Blue Gardenia	Harry Prebble	
1953	Serpent of the Nile	Marc Antony	
1953	Tarzan and the She-Devil	Vargo	
1953	Fort Algiers	Amir	
1954	Casanova's Big Night	Minister Bragadin	
1954	The Immortal City	Narrator	Documentary
1954	Gorilla at Large	Cyrus Miller	
1954	Rear Window	Lars Thorwald	
1954	Khyber Patrol	Capt. Ahmed Shir	
1954	Thunder Pass	Tulsa	
1954	Passion	Capt. Rodriguez	
1954	They Were So Young	Jaime Coltos	
1955	You're Never Too Young	Noonan	
1955	Count Three and Pray	Yancy Huggins	
1955	A Man Alone	Stanley	
1956	Please Murder Me	Craig Carlson	
1956	Godzilla, King of the Monsters!	Steve Martin	
1956	Great Day in the Morning	Jumbo Means	
1956	Secret of Treasure Mountain	Cash Larsen	
1956	A Cry in the Night	Harold Loftus	
1956	Ride the High Iron	Ziggy Moline	
1956	The Brass Legend	Tris Hatten	
1957	Crime of Passion	Tony Pope	
1957	Affair in Havana	Mal Mallabee	
1960	Desire in the Dust	Col. Ben Marquand	
1961	Interrupted Morning	Himself (introduction)	Short film
1962	When Sally Fell	Himself (introduction, conclusion)	Short film
1962	Look Alive	Himself	Short film
1962	Midsummer's Nightmare	Himself	Short film
1962	Giant Steps	Himself	Short film
1962	Why Daddy?	Himself	Short film
1962	No Defense	Himself	Short film
1968	P. J.	William Orbison	
1968	The Small Boat Navy	Presenter	Short film
1978	Tomorrow Never Comes	Burke	
1980	Out of the Blue	Dr. Brean	
1980	The Return	Dr. Kramer	
1982	Airplane II: The Sequel	The Judge	
1985	Godzilla 1985	Steve Martin	Nominee, Golden Raspberry Award for Worst Supporting Actor
1991	The Legend of Kootenai Brown	Judge Webster	
1991	Delirious	Carter Hedison	

=== Radio ===
Date	Title	Role	Notes
May 14, 1934-August 10, 1934	Tarzan and the Diamond Of Asher	Akaru	approximately 15 of 39 episodes
December 30, 1947	Favorite Story		"The Suicide Club"
October 18, 1948	The New Adventures of Michael Shayne		"The Case of the Eager Victim"
October 26, 1948	Favorite Story		"The Jest of Hahalaba"
November 4, 1948	Suspense		"Death Sentence"
December 25, 1948	Wrigley Christmas Party		
January 23, 1949	Screen Directors Playhouse		"The Exile"
February 13 – June 26, 1949	Pat Novak, for Hire	Inspector Hellman	
February 17, 1949	Suspense		"Catch Me If You Can"
April 21, 1949	Suspense		"The Copper Tea Strainer"
May 15, 1949	Screen Directors Playhouse		"Hold Back the Dawn"
June 17, 1949 – August 24, 1950	Dragnet	Ed Backstrand	
July 16, 1949	Dangerous Assignment		"Sunken Ships"
August 24, 1949	Family Theater		"Robert of Sicily"
September 21, 1949	The Amazing Mr. Malone	Paul Conrad	"The Paul Conrad Case"
September 27, 1949 –	Dr. Kildare	Repertory cast	Eight transcribed episodes
October 17, 1949	Screen Directors Playhouse	MacDonald	"Pitfall"
November 23, 1949	Family Theater		"The Courtship of Miles Standish"
January 25, 1950	Family Theater		"Lodging for the Night"
February 19, 1950	The Amazing Mr. Malone	Alan Walsh	"When the Cat's Away the Mice Will Play"
March 8, 1950	Family Theater		"The Prince and the Pauper"
March 24, 1950	Screen Directors Playhouse		"Chicago Deadline"
April 7, 1950	Screen Directors Playhouse		"The Fighting O'Flynn"
April 11, 1950	Yours Truly, Johnny Dollar		"The Dead First Helpers"
May 9, 1950	Yours Truly, Johnny Dollar		"The Harold Trandem Matter"
June 28, 1950	Family Theater		"Lancelot of the Lake"
July 20, 1950	Yours Truly, Johnny Dollar		"The Henry J. Unger Matter"
July 26, 1950	Family Theater		"Julius Caesar"
August 10, 1950	Yours Truly, Johnny Dollar		"The Hartford Alliance Matter"
September 21, 1950	Presenting Charles Boyer		"The Adventure of Painting 137"
October 7, 1950	Yours Truly, Johnny Dollar		"The Richard Splain Matter"
October 16, 1950	Lux Radio Theatre		"House of Strangers"
October 28, 1950	Yours Truly, Johnny Dollar		"The Joan Sebastian Matter"
November 11, 1950	Yours Truly, Johnny Dollar		"The Adam Kegg Matter"
November 15, 1950	Family Theater		"The Story of Peter Zenger"
November 16, 1950	The Lineup		"The Candy Store Murder"
December 6, 1950	Family Theater		"Robert of Sicily"
December 21, 1950	The Lineup		"The Holstedter Case"
December 28, 1950	Screen Directors Playhouse		"Alias Nick Beal"
1950	This Is the Story		"Hometown U.S.A.: Seattle, Washington"
January 4, 1951	Screen Directors Playhouse		"Prince of Foxes"
January 11, 1951	The Lineup		"The Mad Bomber"
March 24, 1951	Dangerous Assignment		"Loaded Dynamite with a Lit Fuse"
April 19, 1951	The Pendleton Story		"The Declaration"
April 24, 1951	The Lineup		"The Brommel and Bellows Bloody Bullet Case"
June 15, 1951	The Pendleton Story		"The Warning"
July 18, 1951	Escape		"Macao"
October 28, 1951	The Silent Men		"The Case of the Rubber Gloves"
November 8, 1951	Hallmark Playhouse		"Twenty-Thousand Leagues Under the Sea"
1951	The Pendleton Story		"The Mischianza"
February 24, 1952	The Whistler		"A Matter of Time"
March 9, 1952	The Whistler		"Breakaway"
April 4, 1952	Richard Diamond, Private Detective		"The Enigma of Big Ed"
April 7, 1952	The Pendleton Story		"The Homecoming"
April 16, 1952	The Pendleton Story		"The Child"
May 1, 1952	Hallmark Playhouse		"Lorna Doone"
May 15, 1952	Hallmark Playhouse		"The Marquis de Lafayette"
May 22, 1952	Hallmark Playhouse		"Marcia Burns"
May 26, 1952	The Railroad Hour		"My Maryland"
June 10, 1952	The Lineup		"Lobdell's Poodle-Cut Tomato Case"
July 17, 1952	Night Beat		"Taste of Peaches"
July 22, 1952	The Lineup		"The Drinkler Kidnapping Case"
August 25, 1952	Dangerous Assignment		"Port Said"
September 7, 1952	The Whistler		"The Secret of Chalk Point"
October 8, 1952	The Lineup		"The Teacher's Pet"
November 23, 1952	Errand of Mercy		"Jimmy is for Luck"
January 30, 1953	Yours Truly, Johnny Dollar		"The Kay Bellamy Matter"
August 10, 1953	The Railroad Hour		"Trilby"
August 23, 1953	Richard Diamond, Private Detective		"The Hollywood Story"
September 20, 1953	Hallmark Hall of Fame		"George Gershwin"
September 26, 1953	Romance		"Treadmill"
September 30, 1953	Family Theater		"Journey of the Pegasus"
October 18, 1953	Hallmark Hall of Fame		"Joseph McCoy"
November 22, 1953	Hallmark Hall of Fame		"Squanto, The Cockney Indian"
December 6, 1953	Hallmark Hall of Fame		"Major Charles Yeager"
March 2, 1954	Rocky Fortune		"Honor Among Thieves"
March 24, 1954	Family Theater		"Night Caller"
October 27, 1954	Family Theater	Narrator	"The Hound of Heaven"
January 12, 1955	Family Theater		"Stranger in Town"
January 22 – October 28, 1956	Fort Laramie	Lee Quince	
March 9, 1956	CBS Radio Workshop		"Report on ESP"
May 25, 1956	CBS Radio Workshop	Narrator	"The Little Prince"
December 30, 1956	Yours Truly, Johnny Dollar		"The Ellen Deer Matter"
March 10, 1957	Suspense		"The Paralta Map"
April 21, 1957	CBS Radio Workshop	Narrator	"The Son of Man"
June 30, 1957	CBS Radio Workshop		"Battle of Gettysburg"
July 14, 1957	CBS Radio Workshop		"The Silent Witness"
July 28, 1957	Suspense		"Murder On Mike"
August 28, 1957	Family Theater	Host	"Sylvia"
October 27, 1957	Suspense		"The Country of the Blind"
October 12, 1958	Suspense		"The Treasure Chest of Don Jose"
December 21, 1958	Suspense		"Out for Christmas"
June 7, 1959	Suspense		"The Pit and the Pendulum"
1968	An American Gallery	Narrator	"Portrait of a Photographer"
August 24, 1969	Special Delivery: Vietnam		"History's First Nationwide Radiothon"

=== Television ===
Date	Title	Role	Notes
March 14, 1951	Stars Over Hollywood		"Prison Doctor"
April 4, 1951	Stars Over Hollywood		"Pearls from Paris"
April 23, 1951	The Bigelow Theatre		"The Big Hello"
December 16, 1951	Dragnet		"The Human Bomb" (series debut)
November 21, 1951	Family Theater	Simon the Cyrenean	"That I May See"
March 21, 1952	Rebound		"Joker's Wild"
April 11, 1952	Rebound	Gomez	"The Wreck"
April 24, 1952	Gruen Playhouse		"The Tiger"
July 2, 1952	The Unexpected	Doctor	"The Magnificent Lie"
September 9, 1952	Gruen Playhouse		"The Leather Coat"
September 23, 1952	Gruen Playhouse		"Face Value"
1952	Family Theater	Balthazar	"A Star Shall Rise"
January 2, 1953	Tales of Tomorrow		"The Mask of Medusa"
January 16, 1953	Your Favorite Story		"How Much Land Does a Man Need?"
April 28, 1953	Chevron Theatre		"No Escape"
December 10, 1953	Four Star Playhouse		"The Room"
January 7, 1954	Ford Theatre	Red Letwick	"The Fugitives"
January 28, 1954	Lux Video Theatre		"A Place in the Sun"
February 11, 1954	Lux Video Theatre	Major Blakestone	"Shall Not Perish"
April 20, 1954	Mr. and Mrs. North		"Murder for Sale"
July 1, 1955	Schlitz Playhouse of Stars	Dr. Sutton	"The Ordeal of Dr. Sutton"
October 7, 1955	The Star and the Story		"The Force of Circumstance"
November 2, 1955	The 20th Century Fox Hour	Major Tetley	"The Ox-Bow Incident"
December 1, 1955	Lux Video Theatre		"The Web"
March 1, 1956	Climax!	Lieutenant Shea	"The Sound of Silence"
March 1, 1956	Ford Theatre	Robert Drayton	"Man Without a Fear"
May 24, 1956	Climax!	Philip Moran	"The Shadow of Evil"
October 18, 1956	Lux Video Theatre	Dan Reynolds	"Tobacco Road"
December 6, 1956	Climax!	Sergeant Ben Gurnick	"Savage Portrait"
1956	Chevron Hall of Stars	Jud	"The Lone Hand"
January 31, 1957	Playhouse 90	Lester Friedman	"The Greer Case"
March 12, 1957	Celebrity Playhouse	George	"No Escape"
September 21, 1957 – May 22, 1966	Perry Mason	Perry Mason	271 episodes Winner, Primetime Emmy Award, Outstanding Lead Actor in a Drama Series, 1959 and 1961; nominee in 1960
December 26, 1957	Playhouse 90	Charles Bent	"The Lone Woman"
June 5, 1958	Playhouse 90	Host	"The Innocent Sleep"
May 6, 1959	11th Emmy Awards	Host	
November 5, 1961	The Jack Benny Program	Perry Mason	"Jack On Trial for Murder"
June 3, 1962	What's My Line?	Mystery guest	
March 28, 1967	Ironside	Robert T. Ironside	World premiere television film Nominee, Primetime Emmy Award, Outstanding Single Performance by an Actor in a Leading Role in a Drama (1968)
September 14, 1967 – January 16, 1975	Ironside	Robert T. Ironside	194 episodes Nominee, Primetime Emmy Award, Outstanding Lead Actor in a Drama Series, 1968, 1969, 1970, 1971 and 1972; Nominee, Golden Globe Award for Best Actor – Television Series Drama, 1969 and 1972
October 6, 1967	Raymond Burr in Vietnam	Himself	One-hour NBC News documentary
January 9, 1968	It Takes a Thief		"A Thief Is a Thief" (series premiere)
September 19, 1972	The Bold Ones: The New Doctors	Robert T. Ironside	"Five Days in the Death of Sgt. Brown"
April 22, 1973	Portrait: A Man Whose Name Was John	Pope John XXIII	
February 8, 1976	Mallory: Circumstantial Evidence	Arthur Mallory	
July 3, 1976	The Inventing of America	Co-host	NBC–BBC co-production for the U.S. Bicentennial, co-hosted by James Burke
September 15, 1976	Kingston: The Power Play	R. B. Kingston	
March 23 – August 10, 1977	Kingston: Confidential	R. B. Kingston	13 episodes
October 16–18, 1977	79 Park Avenue	Armand Perfido	Miniseries
December 12, 1978	The Jordan Chance	Frank Jordan	
October 1, 1978 –	Centennial	Herman Bockweiss	Miniseries
February 3, 1979	The Love Boat	Malcolm Dwyer	"Alas, Poor Dwyer"
May 20, 1979	Love's Savage Fury		
September 21 + 28, 1979	Eischied	Police Commissioner	"Only the Pretty Girls Die"
October 23, 1979	The Misadventures of Sheriff Lobo		
October 28, 1979	Disaster on the Coastliner	Estes Hill	
November 18, 1979	The 13th Day: The Story of Esther	Narrator	
May 8 + 9, 1980	The Curse of King Tut's Tomb	Jonash Sebastian	
December 18, 1980	The Night the City Screamed	Mayor	
April 12 + 14, 1981	Peter and Paul	Herod Agrippa	
December 1, 1985	Perry Mason Returns	Perry Mason	First of 26 television films
May 25, 1986	Perry Mason: The Case of the Notorious Nun	Perry Mason	
November 9, 1986	Perry Mason: The Case of the Shooting Star	Perry Mason	
January 20, 1987	Unsolved Mysteries	Host	Special that launched the series
February 23, 1987	Perry Mason: The Case of the Lost Love	Perry Mason	
May 24, 1987	Perry Mason: The Case of the Sinister Spirit	Perry Mason	
October 4, 1987	Perry Mason: The Case of the Murdered Madam	Perry Mason	
November 15, 1987	Perry Mason: The Case of the Scandalous Scoundrel	Perry Mason	
February 28, 1988	Perry Mason: The Case of the Avenging Ace	Perry Mason	
May 15, 1988	Perry Mason: The Case of the Lady in the Lake	Perry Mason	
February 12, 1989	Perry Mason: The Case of the Lethal Lesson	Perry Mason	
April 9, 1989	Perry Mason: The Case of the Musical Murder	Perry Mason	
November 19, 1989	Perry Mason: The Case of the All-Star Assassin	Perry Mason	
1989–91	Trial by Jury	Judge Gordon Duane	Syndicated series
January 21, 1990	Perry Mason: The Case of the Poisoned Pen	Perry Mason	
March 11, 1990	Perry Mason: The Case of the Desperate Deception	Perry Mason	
May 20, 1990	Perry Mason: The Case of the Silenced Singer	Perry Mason	
September 30, 1990	Perry Mason: The Case of the Defiant Daughter	Perry Mason	
January 6, 1991	Perry Mason: The Case of the Ruthless Reporter	Perry Mason	
February 11, 1991	Perry Mason: The Case of the Maligned Mobster	Perry Mason	
May 14, 1991	Perry Mason: The Case of the Glass Coffin	Perry Mason	
September 24, 1991	Perry Mason: The Case of the Fatal Fashion	Perry Mason	
March 1, 1992	Perry Mason: The Case of the Fatal Framing	Perry Mason	
May 5, 1992	Perry Mason: The Case of the Reckless Romeo	Perry Mason	
October 30, 1992	Perry Mason: The Case of the Heartbroken Bride	Perry Mason	
February 19, 1993	Perry Mason: The Case of the Skin-Deep Scandal	Perry Mason	
May 4, 1993	The Return of Ironside	Robert T. Ironside	
May 21, 1993	Perry Mason: The Case of the Telltale Talk Show Host	Perry Mason	
November 29, 1993	Perry Mason: The Case of the Killer Kiss	Perry Mason	Released posthumously; features an in-memory notice at the end of film.

== See also ==
- List of celebrities who own wineries and vineyards
