= High Treason (1951 film) =

1951 British film by Roy Boulting

- Original British quad poster
- Directed by: Roy Boulting
- Written by: Roy Boulting; Frank Harvey
- Produced by: Paul Soskin
- Starring: Liam Redmond; Anthony Bushell; André Morell
- Cinematography: Gilbert Taylor
- Edited by: Max Benedict
- Music by: John Addison
- Production company: Conqueror Films
- Distributed by: General Film Distributors; Peacemaker Pictures (US)
- Release dates: 13 November 1951; (UK); May 1952 (US)
- Running time: 90 minutes
- Country: United Kingdom
- Language: English
- Budget: £168,325
- Box office: £88,000

High Treason is a 1951 British spy thriller film directed by Roy Boulting and starring Liam Redmond, Anthony Bushell and André Morell. It was written by Boulting and Frank Harvey. It is a sequel to Seven Days to Noon (1950), co-directed by Boulting and John Boulting.

The Guardian called the film "the only real British equivalent of the Red Scare movies then being turned out in Hollywood."

== Plot ==
Enemy saboteurs infiltrate the industrial suburbs of London, intending to disable three power stations in London and five other stations elsewhere, all strategically located throughout the UK. Their motive is to cripple the British economy and to enable subversive forces to insinuate themselves into government. The saboteurs are thwarted, not by counterintelligence agents, but by workaday London police officers, and finally by a repentant betrayer from their own ranks.

== Cast ==
- Liam Redmond as Commander Robert Brennan
- André Morell as Superintendent Folland
- Anthony Bushell as Major Elliott
- Kenneth Griffith as Jimmy Ellis (Soviet agent)
- Patric Doonan as George Ellis
- Joan Hickson as Mrs Ellis
- Anthony Nicholls as Sir Grant Mansfield, M.P.
- Mary Morris as Anna Braun (Soviet agent)
- Geoffrey Keen as Morgan Williams (Soviet agent)
- Stuart Lindsell as Commissioner
- John Bailey as Stringer
- Dora Bryan as Mrs Bowers
- Charles Lloyd-Pack as Percy Ward
- Laurence Naismith as Reginald Gordon-Wells
- Michael Ward as music club member (uncredited)
- Dandy Nichols as doorstep cleaner (uncredited)
- Alfie Bass as Albert Brewer (uncredited)
- Jean Anderson as woman in street (uncredited)
- Glyn Houston as railway shunter (uncredited)
- Peter Jones announcer at music club (uncredited)
- Moultrie Kelsall as ship's captain (uncredited)
- Howard Lang as policeman (uncredited)
- Harry Locke as Andy, telephone engineer (uncredited)
- Victor Maddern as anarchist (uncredited)
- Tony Quinn as chemistry lecturer (uncredited)
- Marianne Stone as Alfie's mother (uncredited)
- Bruce Seton (uncredited)

== Production ==
The film was based on an idea of producer Paul Soskin, who owned Conqueror Films. According to Roy Boutling the film was originally called First Spy, Second Front. Soskin approached Roy Boulting who said he "pointed out that the war was over, that a more topical ‘thriller’ could be taken from the headlines of any newspaper any day of the week. He solemnly picked up a morning daily. I, with equal solemnity, seized on a headline. He agreed. And, together with Frank Harvey, I went away and wrote the screenplay of High Treason — not, by the way, our title. Cast with then largely unknowns, of its genre it was a pretty good example."

The story was inspired by a real incident in July 1950 where ammunition barges bound for Korea blew up in Portsmouth, allegedly as a result of sabotage.

The movie was part financed with a loan from the National Film Finance Corporation.

Other titles for the film were I Spy Strangers, Secret Plan X23 and Sabotage.

Filming started 15 January 1951 at Pinewood Studios, with three weeks on location at Battersea Power Station. There was a great deal of secrecy about the story during production.

Frank Harvey Jnr, who wrote the script, played a small role.

An unsuccessful lawsuit was taken out against the filmmakers by the author of a book titled High Treason seeking an injunction to stop use of the title.

== Release ==
The film was originally set to be released on 18 October 1951; however the Rank Organisation delayed release until 23 October, immediately after polling day for the 1951 election, because the film was seen to be anti-Communist and thus political. It was distributed in the US by Pacemaker Pictures.

== Reception ==
=== Critical ===
The Monthly Film Bulletin wrote: "As a successor to Seven Days to Noon, High Treason is extremely disappointing. The action lacks coherence and unity, the plot devices which are used to carry it forward rely too largely on coincidence, and the story never gathers momentum satisfactorily, so that its excitements are unconvincing. A tendency, present in the earlier film, to build every small part into a piece of character playing, is here indulged to excess ... High Treason has been poorly served by its advance publicity; the much stressed secrecy in which it was made and the decision to hold up its showing until after the election, suggested something far more serious in intention than the film has to offer."

The Evening Standard wrote that the film was "so potted with yawning illogical gaps in its story that it fails to convince on any but the most immature bang bang level."

Variety wrote: "With the production of High Treason British studios make their first entry into the political film derby. Devoid of name values, picture is a natural for special ext ploitation on its strong sabotage angle. It should cash in on the current cycle of such yarns. Skillful handling may put the film in the big money bracket, at least here."

The Observer called it "a very exciting thriller."

The Daily Telegraph wrote that the film was "highly entertaining" but "could have been better."

Filmink called it "flat".

The New York Times wrote, "it is worthy to note that High Treason travels at a more leisurely pace than Seven Days, but Roy Boulting, who also directed, achieves an equally intelligent handling of the many pieces needed to fit his intricate jigsaw of a plot," and remarked that, "deft direction, crisp dialogue and a generally excellent cast gives High Treason a high polish," concluding that the film is "a taut tale and a pleasure".

=== Box office ===
The film did not perform well at the box office in England, although it was one of the most popular 1951 films in Scotland. It performed reasonably well in the US, grossing $100,000 at a time when British films struggled in America.
