= Robert Benevides =

American actor (1930–2024)

- Born: Robert Leal Benevides; 9 February 1930; Visalia, California, U.S.
- Died: 9 April 2024 (aged 94); Turlock, California, U.S.
- Other names: Robert Beneveds; Robert Harrow; Bob Benevedes
- Education: University of California, Berkeley
- Occupations: Actor; Producer; Composer
- Years active: 1957–2024
- Partner: Raymond Burr (1960–1993, his death)

Robert Benevides (February 9, 1930 – April 9, 2024) was an American actor and production consultant. He was best known as the long-time domestic partner of actor Raymond Burr, with whom he operated a successful orchid business and a vineyard.

== Early life and education ==
Robert Leal Benevides was born on February 9, 1930, in Visalia, California. He was a Korean War veteran before beginning his career as an actor. He graduated from the University of California, Berkeley.

== Career ==
Benevides met actor Raymond Burr on the set of the TV series Perry Mason in 1960. They became domestic partners and remained together for 33 years, until Burr's death in 1993.

Benevides had several acting credits, appearing in television shows such as The Outer Limits, Ironside, The Lineup, and Death Valley Days. He sometimes used the screen name Robert Harrow.

In 1963, Benevides gave up acting to work behind the scenes. He became a production executive for 140 episodes of the TV series Ironside from 1969 to 1975, and a production consultant for 21 of the later Perry Mason TV movies. He also served as an executive producer for The Return of Ironside (1993).

== Personal life ==
Throughout Burr's life, their relationship was kept private from the general public due to industry norms regarding homosexuality at the time. After Burr's death, Benevides became more open about their life together, helping to clarify aspects of Burr's personal history which had previously been obscured by studio-driven narratives.

== Death ==
Benevides died on April 9, 2024, in Turlock, California, at the age of 94.

== Filmography ==
=== Television series ===
| Year | Title | Role | Notes |
|---|---|---|---|
| 1957 | West Point | Cadet Tom Garber / Cadet Dan Cooper | Episode: Dangerous Area & The Deep End |
| 1957 | Official Detective | Jackson | Episode: The Night It Rained Bullets |
| 1957 | The Restless Gun | Evan Case | Episode: Trail To Sunset |
| 1957 | Death Valley Days | Dave Chapman | Episode: The Calico Dog |
| 1957 | Navy Log | Larry Hilton | Episode: The Beach Pounders |
| 1957 | The Loretta Young Show | Bob Anderson | Episode: Power Play |
| 1958 | Dick Powell's Zane Grey Theatre | Dave Bechdolt | Episode: The Doctor Keeps a Promise |
| 1958 | The Real McCoys | Volunteer | Episode: The Volunteer Fire Department |
| 1958 | The Lineup | Wilbur Beldon | Episode: The G.I. Shoe Case |
| 1960 | Goodyear Theatre | Martin Buell | Episode: The Glorious Fourth |
| 1960 | Alcoa Theatre | Martin Buell | Episode: The Glorious Fourth |
| 1961 | Perry Mason | Young Man | Episode: The Case of the Violent Vest |
| 1963 | The Outer Limits | Capt. James Harrison | Episode: O.B.I.T |

=== Film ===
| Year | Title | Role | Notes |
|---|---|---|---|
| 1957 | The Monster That Challenged the World | Seaman Morty Beatty | Debut |

== Joint ventures ==
Benevides and Burr shared a passion for horticulture and winemaking. Their company, Sea God Nurseries, had nurseries in Fiji, Hawaii, the Azores, and California, and was responsible for developing over 1,500 new orchid hybrids, one of which Benevides named the "Barbara Hale Orchid" after Burr's Perry Mason co-star. They were also among the earliest importers and breeders of Portuguese Water Dogs in the United States.

Later, they established a vineyard in California's Dry Creek Valley, where they cultivated Cabernet Sauvignon, Chardonnay, and grapes for Port wine. After Burr's death in 1993, Benevides continued to manage the property, renaming it the Raymond Burr Vineyards in his partner's memory (reportedly against Burr's initial wishes). The property was sold in 2017.
