= Marjorie Fielding =

British actress (1890–1956)

Publicity still of Marjorie Fielding

Doris Marjorie Fielding (known as Marjorie) (17 February 1890, in Gloucester, Gloucestershire – 28 December 1956, in London) was a British stage and film actress.

Marjorie Fielding was the second daughter of John & Ellen Fielding (née Miles). She was born on 17 February 1890 in Gloucester. The family were well to do and her father was a partner in the engineering firm Fielding and Platt.

She attended Cheltenham Ladies College and then obtained a place as an actor in the Liverpool Playhouse as part of the Liverpool Repertory Company. She then went on to play in West End productions such as Quiet Wedding, Quiet Weekend and Modern Triangle. She lived in London during the 1940s and '50s acting in a number of British films. Most of her roles were as elderly women with an aristocratic demeanour.

Marjorie Fielding never married.

She was friends with the young Laurence Olivier and John Gielgud who attended her memorial service.

She died of cancer on 28 December 1956 at St Martin in the Fields.

== Selected filmography ==
- Second Thoughts (1938)
- Quiet Wedding (1941)
- Jeannie (1941)
- Easy Money (1948)
- Spring in Park Lane (1948)
- Conspirator (1949)
- The Chiltern Hundreds (1949)
- The Mudlark (1950)
- Portrait of Clare (1950)
- The Lavender Hill Mob (1951)
- The Magic Box (1951)
- The Franchise Affair (1951)
- Mandy (1952)
- The Woman's Angle (1952)
- Laughing in the Sunshine (1956)

== Selected stage credits ==
- Toad of Toad Hall by A.A. Milne (1929)
- The Shining Hour by Keith Winter (1934)
- Quiet Wedding by Esther McCracken (1938)
- Quiet Weekend by Esther McCracken (1941)
- The Chiltern Hundreds by William Douglas Home (1947)
- The River Line by Charles Langbridge Morgan (1952)
