= Interlude (1968 film) =

1968 British film by Kevin Billington

- Directed by: Kevin Billington
- Screenplay by: Lee Langley; Hugh Leonard
- Produced by: David Deutsch; Jack Hanbury
- Starring: Oskar Werner; Barbara Ferris; Virginia Maskell
- Cinematography: Gerry Fisher
- Edited by: Bert Bates
- Music by: Georges Delerue
- Color process: Technicolor
- Production company: Domino Films
- Distributed by: Columbia Pictures
- Release dates: May 1968 (UK); 2 July 1968 (NYC); 15 July 1968 (USA)
- Running time: 113 minutes
- Country: United Kingdom
- Language: English
- Box office: $1.6 million (US/Canada)

Interlude is a 1968 British drama film directed by Kevin Billington and starring Oskar Werner, Barbara Ferris and Virginia Maskell. It was written by Lee Langley and Hugh Leonard.

The film is a loose remake of the 1957 American film Interlude directed by Douglas Sirk, set against the backdrop of Swinging London. It was Maskell's final film as she died in January 1968, five months before its release.

== Plot ==
A famous male conductor gives an interview to an attractive young female reporter. He speaks a bit too frankly and ends up being given an unwanted sabbatical from conducting. He begins an affair with the young reporter during his interlude, and the accumulation of differences in their ages and background begins to mount.

== Cast ==
- Oskar Werner as Stefan Zelter
- Barbara Ferris as Sally
- Virginia Maskell as Antonia
- Donald Sutherland as Lawrence
- Nora Swinburne as Mary
- Alan Webb as Andrew
- Bernard Kay as George Selworth
- Geraldine Sherman as Natalie Selworth
- John Cleese as PR Man
- Humphrey Burton as TV Director
- Gino Melvazzi as Mario
- Muguette De Braie as Mario's Wife
- Robert Lang as Humphrey Turnbull
- Roslyn De Winter as Humphrey's Secretary
- Janet Davies as Nanny
- Sarah Jane Stratton as Sarah Jane
- Simon Davis as Simon
- Steve Plytas as Frederico
- Roselie Westwater as Hotel Receptionist
- Gay Cameron as Andrew's Girlfriend
- Anjula Harman as Lawrence's Pupil
- Ernest Fleishmann as Orchestra Manager
- Derek Jacobi as Paul
- Richard Pescud as Ernest

== Production ==
The film was shot at Shepperton Studios and on location around London including the Royal Albert Hall in Kensington, Fountain Court in Temple, Chelsea, and the Royal Festival Hall. The Zelter family home was shot at Binfield Manor in Berkshire, and Bodiam Castle and The Mermaid Inn, Rye in East Sussex were used for filming. The film's sets were designed by art director Tony Woollard.

Singer Timi Yuro performed the title song "Interlude". Another version by Yuro was released commercially. The song was covered in 1994 as duet by Morrissey and Siouxsie Sioux.

== Reception ==
Penelope Houston wrote in The Monthly Film Bulletin wrote: "The attempt, clearly, was to play within romantic conventions, which Billington obviously enjoys (the film is set in a light, leafy, summery, non-swinging London), and at the same time to take the characters out of cliché and into an area of real choices and non-confected attitudes. ... Oskar Werner gives one of his effective, slightly abstracted performances, while Barbara Ferris pushes rather hard at gay or hurt girlishness. The girl reporter role becomes less plausible as the film continues – and in terms of what one feels Interlude is trying to do, if not those of conventional romance, a sense of consistent accuracy about people's jobs and habits is important. Still, the film is always attractive and dexterous (characters read the right books, eat in recognisable and right restaurants): a notably unflurried transition to the larger screen."

Variety wrote: "All the excitement and ecstacy [sic], as well as the bittersweet, foredoomed disenchantment of extra-marital romance are contained in the original screenplay. Strong writing, superior acting and firstrate direction make this a powerful, personal drama."

Time Out said, "Billington mercifully avoids the excesses of 'Swinging London', and his observant delineation of the discrepancy between the characters' would-be sophistication and their actual stock responses is, on the whole, well supported by the performances."

TV Guide wrote the film does not capture the level of films like Intermezzo and Brief Encounter, but praised the chemistry between Werner and Ferris.

Renata Adler of The New York Times criticized Interlude, saying its narrative could not support the film. However, she added, "There are two remarkable supporting performances: one, by Donald Sutherland, as a lisping, bumbling, thoroughly decent family friend; the other by the late Virginia Maskell, as the beautiful, intelligent wife in pain."

== See also ==
- List of British films of 1968
- Interlude (1957)
