= Murder Reported =

1957 British film by Charles Saunders

- Directed by: Charles Saunders
- Screenplay by: Doreen Montgomery
- Produced by: Guido Coen
- Starring: Paul Carpenter; Melissa Stribling; John Laurie
- Cinematography: Brendan J. Stafford
- Edited by: Jerry Levy
- Music by: Reg Owen
- Production company: Fortress Productions
- Release date: 6 May 1957
- Running time: 56 minutes
- Country: United Kingdom
- Language: English

Murder Reported is a 1957 British second feature ('B') film directed by Charles Saunders and starring Paul Carpenter, Melissa Stribling and John Laurie. It was written by Doreen Montgomery based on the 1953 novel Murder for the Million by Robert Chapman.

== Plot ==
Following a tip-off from their newspaper's informant Mr. Hatter, reporters Jeff Holly and Amanda North are assigned to cover a murder case where a body has been found in a suitcase. A woman identifies the body as that of her late aunt, who has already been buried. When her coffin is opened it is found to contain the body of Councillor Hollond, a local politician. Holly and North discover that Hatter murdered Hollond and switched the bodies.

== Cast ==
- Paul Carpenter as Jeff Holly
- Melissa Stribling as Amanda North
- John Laurie as Mac
- Peter Swanwick as Hatter
- Patrick Holt as Bill Stevens
- Maurice Durant as Carmady
- Georgia Brown as Myra
- Yvonne Warren as Betty
- Gladys Boot as Dorothy

== Reception ==
The Monthly Film Bulletin wrote: "Superficial in its approach and weak in construction, this innocuous thriller loses any opportunities its sordid crime subject might have offered. Nevertheless one must acknowledge in its favour good location photography, crisp dialogue and efficient acting."

Kine Weekly wrote: "The picture attempts the inconsequential approach to crime, but sadly lacks essential pep and polish. Paul Carpenter is a manly Jeff, and Melissa Stribling displays a certain amount of charm as Amanda, but Peter Swanwick has to show his hand much too early as killer Hatter, and the rest mean little."

Picture Show wrote: "Well-made crime film starring Paul Carpenter as newspaper reporter who solves several crimes with the aid of his boss's daughter, Amanda, a part which is attractively played by Melissa Stribling. Supporting roles are competently acted and newcomer Yvonne Warren does well as a glamorous barmaid."

Picturegoer wrote: "By relegating the men in blue to a back seat, the film – despite tolerably good acting – sacrifices credulity and creates more unintentional laughs than intentional thrills. Skip it!"

Variety wrote: "It's pretty old hat in conception, and there isn't much diverting about its variations. It stacks up as just another feature for double-bill filler and mild even in that classification. ... Performances are adequate although nothing much can be done with the frequently tiresome characters. The picture is exceptionally short (less than an hour), and this, possibly, will be its greatest asset in booking."

In British Sound Films: The Studio Years 1928–1959 David Quinlan rated the film as "mediocre", writing: "Breezily acted but crime drama evokes more laughs than thrills."
