= Virgin Island (film) =

1958 British film by Pat Jackson

- 1959 theatrical poster
- Directed by: Pat Jackson
- Written by: Ring Lardner Jr.
- Produced by: Leon Clore
- Starring: John Cassavetes; Virginia Maskell; Sidney Poitier
- Cinematography: Freddie Francis
- Edited by: Gordon Pilkinton
- Music by: Clifton Parker
- Distributed by: British Lion Film Corporation
- Release date: October 1958; (UK)
- Running time: 94 minutes
- Country: United Kingdom
- Language: English

Virgin Island (U.S. title: Our Virgin Island ) is a 1958 British drama film directed by Pat Jackson and starring John Cassavetes, Virginia Maskell and Sidney Poitier. It was adapted by Ring Lardner Jr. from the 1953 memoir Our Virgin Island by Robb White.

== Premise ==
A British woman marries an American writer in spite of her family's disapproval and goes to live with him on a tropical island.

== Cast ==
- John Cassavetes as Evan
- Virginia Maskell as Tina
- Sidney Poitier as Marcus
- Isabel Dean as Mrs. Lomax
- Colin Gordon as commissioner
- Ruby Dee as Ruth
- Howard Marion-Crawford as Prescott
- Arnold Bell as Heath
- Gladys Boot as Mrs. Carruthers
- Alonzo Bozan as Grant
- Edric Connor as Captain Jason
- Reginald Hearne as doctor
- Julian Mayfield as band leader
- Nancy E. Roy as baby

== Production ==
It was filmed on the British Virgin Islands.

Freddie Francis said he was "pressured" into doing the film by producer Leon Clore.

I don't think Pat Jackson particularly wanted me to do it. But Leon wanted me to do it. Not that there was any bad feeling between dear old Pat and myself but once again Pat was the wrong guy I think for the picture because the two stars were John Cassavetes and Sidney Poitier. And let's face it, those two guys with dear old Pat whose such a nice bloke and basically a documentary director, he was way off... I remember one night I was having dinner in the yacht club in one of the Virgin Islands and Sidney Poitier and Cassavetes came over and said would I take the picture over. I said listen I can't do that, you better go and speak to Leon. So anyway they went to Leon and obviously Leon said no you can't do that. So it was a very unhappy picture from that point of view.

== Critical reception ==
The Monthly Film Bulletin wrote: "So long as this film makes no effort to create a dramatic scene or to talk seriously to the audience it is gaily and romantically successful; the comedy is unforced and the high spirits infectious. But when John Cassavetes, always too intense, begins to sermonise on independence, Virginia Maskell to preach about the tribulations of writers, and Isabel Dean to speak an uncomfortable monologue about being cut off from life, the film discloses an unnerving capacity to raise a squirm among the more worldly audiences. Sidney Poitier's outrageous caricature of the laughing West Indian hovers constantly on the verge of the sinister, but his ebullience, and the crisp, clean-living appeal of Miss Maskell in her less serious moods, are the film's two undeniable assets."

Picture Show wrote: "John Cassavetes and Virginia Maskell make a good team in this delightful romantic comedy. The story of how they meet, marry and set up home on an uninhabited island is lightweight but charms nevertheless. The island settings are beautiful and are photographed excellently. A most appealing and enjoyable film."

In The Radio Times Guide to Films Adrian Turner gave the film 2/5 stars, writing: "Cassavetes, an inwardly seething Method actor, is hardly romantic leading man material. Nothing more than a travelogue with silly dialogue, it's bland."

In British Sound Films: The Studio Years 1928–1959 David Quinlan rated the film as "good", writing: "Warm, happy film that occasionally gets a bit preachy."

A review in Variety (November 5, 1958) criticized the editing, but noted: "Nevertheless, 'Virgin Island' provides pleasant, leisurely entertainment."
