= The Weaker Sex (1948 film) =

British drama

- Original film poster
- Directed by: Roy Ward Baker
- Written by: Esther McCracken; Paul Soskin; Val Valentine (additional scenes)
- Based on: the play No Medals by Esther McCracken
- Produced by: Paul Soskin
- Starring: Ursula Jeans; Cecil Parker; Joan Hopkins
- Cinematography: Erwin Hillier
- Edited by: Michael C. Chorlton; Joseph Sterling
- Music by: Arthur Wilkinson
- Production company: Two Cities Films
- Distributed by: General Film Distributors
- Release date: 22 September 1948
- Running time: 84 minutes
- Country: United Kingdom
- Language: English
- Budget: £175,200
- Box office: £105,800

The Weaker Sex is a 1948 British drama film directed by Roy Ward Baker and starring Ursula Jeans, Cecil Parker and Joan Hopkins. It was written by Esther McCracken, Paul Soskin and Val Valentine based on McCracken's 1944 play No Medals.

It was one of the most popular films at the British box office in 1948. The film's subject was what The New York Times described as the "heroics of that valiant legion of women who stood, but did not wait, through the long war years and the now dreary post war years."

== Plot ==
Set near Portsmouth, one of the main bases for the D-Day invasion fleet, the film portrays life on the British home front during World War II.

During the run up to D-Day in 1944, widowed Martha Dacre tries to keep house and home together for her two daughters and two servicemen billeted on her, including Geoffrey, a naval officer who was a friend of her deceased husband. Although her two daughters serve as Wrens, and her son is away in the Navy, she has chosen to stay at home as a housewife, but she also participates in fire-watching and works in a canteen for the armed forces. When she learns that her son's ship was damaged during the landings, she experiences regrets about not taking a more active role in the war.

Using occasional footage of actual events and with frequent reference to contemporary newspaper and wireless reports, the story moves forward from D-Day to VE-Day, the 1945 general election and on to 1948 when the film was made. Martha eventually re-marries to Geoffrey who has by now become a father-figure to her son and daughters.

== Cast ==
- Ursula Jeans as Martha Dacre
- Cecil Parker as Geoffrey Radcliffe
- Joan Hopkins as Helen
- Derek Bond as Nigel
- Lana Morris as Lolly
- John Stone as Roddy
- Digby Wolfe as Benjie
- Thora Hird as Mrs. Gaye
- Bill Owen as soldier
- Marian Spencer as Harriet Lessing
- Kynaston Reeves as Captain Dishart
- Eleanor Summerfield as clippie
- Dorothy Bramhall as Mrs. Maling
- Gladys Henson as woman in fish queue
- Merle Tottenham as woman in fish queue
- Vi Kaley as old woman on sea front
- Marjorie Gresley as shop supervisor

== Production ==
The film was shot at Denham Studios with location shooting taking place in Margate, Portchester Castle and the village of Denham in Buckinghamshire. The film's sets were designed by the art director Alex Vetchinsky.

== Reception ==
=== Box office ===
The film was popular at the British box office. According to Kinematograph Weekly it was a runner-up for 'biggest winner' at the box office in 1948. The film earned producer's receipts of £92,700 in the UK and £13,100 overseas.

According to Rank's own records the film had made a loss of £69,400 for the company by December 1949.

=== Critical ===
Critical reception was lukewarm, but the film had some defenders. A critic for The News of the World wrote, "I see that according to my fellow critics The Weaker Sex ... is riddled with faults. Therefore I ask your indulgence for being incapable of detailing these grave weaknesses. I must have missed them because I was enjoying myself so much".

The Monthly Film Bulletin wrote: "Cecil Parker is the kindly Commander, Ursula Jeans the mother and general confidant, Joan Hopkins the affectionate elder daughter, supported by a reasonably adequate cast. Thora Hird, however, steals the picture as Mrs. Gaye, the "daily", with her extremely dry sense of humour, and creates the laughs in an otherwise fairly serious film."

The New York Times wrote, "a thoroughly professional cast and an adult script make the drama genuine and trenchant. Ursula Jeans is excellent as the beleaguered mother who minimizes her work and sacrifices by remarking "one is given no choice — just a little extra strength from somewhere." Cecil Parker is equally adept in his restrained portrayal of the commander she eventually marries. The wonderful Thora Hird contributes a superbly droll bit as a Yorkshire servant and Joan Hopkins, Lana Morris, Digby Wolfe, Derek Bond and John Stone add solid characterizations as the children and sons-in-law."

Variety wrote: "It's difficult to determine the motives which prompted Paul Soskin to make The Weaker Sex because it possesses very little in story values, and devotes a large part of its footage to recalling the war days without saying anything new. ... Pic's main weakness, however, is its lack of action; it's almost the stage play transferred to celluloid and brought up to date by the authoress herself. As Mrs. Dacre, Ursula Jeans has a part which she handles with utmost ease; Cecil Parker is nicely cast as the naval officer whom she marries, and Lana Morris makes a satisfying starring debut as one of the Wrens. Major supporting roles are played with competence by an experienced cast but they are unable to redeem a subject which, while abounding in sincerity, is devoid of vitality."

Leslie Halliwell said: "Mild suburban comedy which sparkled more on stage, with such curtain lines as 'Quick, the fishmonger's got fish!'."

Sky Movies wrote, "the best reviews of the period were saved for Thora Hird as Mrs Gage [sic], the 'daily' with a dry sense of humour", and concluded, "good, solid drama told convincingly – if a trifle over-sentimental today."

In British Sound Films: The Studio Years 1928–1959 David Quinlan rated the film as "very good", writing: "Nicely human story, well handled: sentimental but convincingly so."

The Radio Times Guide to Films gave the film 2/5 stars, writing: "A marvellous British cast plays out this nostalgic and very human story of the latter war years, leading up to D-Day."
