= Quiet Weekend (play) =

1941 play by Esther McCracken

Original theatre programme

Quiet Weekend is a 1941 play by the British writer Esther McCracken. It opened on 2 July 1941 at Wyndham's Theatre in London's West End, where it enjoyed a successful run of 1,059 performances, closing on 29 January 1944. The production was directed by Richard Bird and designed by Michael Relph. It was a sequel to the 1938 play Quiet Wedding.

== Plot ==
Mildred and Arthur Royd own a "quiet" weekend country cottage. Their daughter, Marcia and her husband arrive not on the best of terms. Denys, the Royds' young son, arrives with the glamorous Rowena Marriott but Miranda, a young guest, remains embrassingly devoted to him.

Mildred has to cope with the complications which develop as everything goes wrong.

Arthur keeps company with Adrian Barasford. Bachelor Adrian's interest is divided between discussing fishing with Arthur and his devotion to the charming middle-aged Mary Jarrow. Arthur and Adrian become involved in a salmon-poaching with matters straightened out the next day but all leave hurriedly to escape the consequences and to evade a visit from the vicar looking for money.

== Original West End cast ==
- Adrian Barrasford - Frank Cellier
- Arthur Royd - George Thorpe
- Bella Hitchins - Helene Burls
- Denys Royd - Michael Wilding
- Ella Spender - Dorothy Batley
- Jim Brent - Geoffrey Denys
- Marcia Brent - Gwynne Whitby
- Mary Jerrow - Gladys Boot
- Mildred Royd - Marjorie Fielding
- Miranda Bute - Glynis Johns
- Rowena Marriott - Jeanne Stuart
- Sally Spender - Gabrielle Blunt
- Sam Pecker - Basil Mitchell

== Adaptation ==
In 1946 it was turned into a film Quiet Weekend directed by Harold French.

== Bibliography ==
- Chambers, Colin. Continuum Companion to Twentieth Century Theatre. Continuum, 2002.
- Wearing, J.P. The London Stage 1940-1949: A Calendar of Productions, Performers, and Personnel. Rowman & Littlefield, 2014.
