= Melissa Stribling =

Scottish actress (1926–1992)

- Born: Melissa Stribling Smith; 7 November 1926; Gourock, Renfrewshire, Scotland
- Died: 22 March 1992 (aged 65); Watford, Hertfordshire, England
- Occupation: Actress
- Spouse: Basil Dearden
- Children: James Dearden

Melissa Stribling (7 November 1926 – 22 March 1992) was a Scottish film and television actress. She began her professional career in a repertory company, presenting a different play each week at the Grand Theatre, Croydon in 1948. She remains best known for playing the role of Mina Holmwood in the horror film Dracula (1958).

== Career ==
Born in Gourock, Scotland as Melissa Stribling Smith, she started out in 1945 as a member of the Ealing Studios Amateur Dramatic Society, turning professional in 1948 and appearing that year with repertory companies at Croydon, Worthing and Windsor. Her screen career began with a small role in the film The First Gentleman, also in 1948.

In the 1960s and 1970s, she guest-starred in the TV series Benny Hill (1963), ITV Play of the Week, The Avengers, The Persuaders!, The Dick Emery Show, Crown Court (TV series) ('Safe as Houses'), and The New Avengers. Her last appearance was in the film Paris by Night (1988) with Charlotte Rampling.

Stribling is best known for playing the role of Mina Holmwood in the Hammer Films production Dracula (1958), starring Peter Cushing and, in the title role, Christopher Lee. In the film, her character is the victim of a vampire in what has been seen as an erotically charged performance. Dracula and Mina showing sexual pleasure in this way has often been described as a first in British cinema. The film's director, Terence Fisher, remembered her asking him how to play the scene. He replied by saying that she should imagine that she'd had "one whale of a sexual night" and that it should show on her face. Fisher said that she produced a satisfied little facial expression that spoke volumes.Jonathan Rigby complimented her performance in his book English Gothic: A Century of Horror Cinema, saying that she is "a terrific female lead throughout" the film.

== Family ==
She was married to the film director Basil Dearden; their sons are James Dearden, also a director, and Torquil Dearden, a London-based editor at a company specialising in commercials and corporate videos. After Basil Dearden's death in 1971, she was briefly married to film producer Richard du Vivier.

== Filmography ==
Year	Title	Role	Notes
1948	The First Gentleman	Lady Conyngham	
1952	Wide Boy	Caroline	
1952	Crow Hollow	Diana Wilson	
1952	Ghost Ship	Party Girl (Vera)	
1953	Decameron Nights	Girl in Villa	
1953	Noose for a Lady	Vanessa Lane	
1954	Thought to Kill	Mary	
1955	Out of the Clouds	Jean Osmond	
1956	Behind the Headlines	Mary Carrick	
1956	Destination Death (Scotland Yard)	Helen Challoner	Episode: Destination Death
1957	Murder Reported	Amanda North	
1958	The Safecracker	Angela	
1958	Dracula	Mina Holmwood	
1959	The Four Just Men	Mrs Bannion	Episode: The Deserter
1959	The Adventures of William Tell	Countess Von Markhein	Episode: The Young Widow
1960	The League of Gentlemen	Peggy	
1961	The Secret Partner	Helen Standish	
1963	24-Hour Call	Jackie Harwood	Episode: Man Alone
1968	Only When I Larf	Diana	
1968	Journey into Darkness	Helen Ames	Episode: The New People
1970	The Persuaders!	Lisa Koestler	Episode: Powerswitch
1971	Crucible of Terror	Joanna Brent	
1971	The Passenger	Evelyn Walker	All three episodes
1974	Confessions of a Window Cleaner	Mrs. Villiers	
1976	Feelings	Charlotte Randall	
1979	Sherlock Holmes and Doctor Watson	Dora Langley	Episode: The Case of the Speckled Band
1988	Paris by Night	Lady Boeing	(final film role)
