= Man on the Run =

1949 British film noir by Lawrence Huntington

- Directed by: Lawrence Huntington
- Written by: Lawrence Huntington
- Produced by: Lawrence Huntington
- Starring: Derek Farr
- Cinematography: Wilkie Cooper
- Edited by: Monica Kimick
- Music by: Philip Green
- Production company: Associated British Picture Corporation
- Distributed by: Associated British-Pathe
- Release dates: 20 May 1949 (London); 5 June 1949 (United Kingdom); 29 August 1951 (United States)
- Running time: 82 minutes
- Country: United Kingdom
- Language: English
- Budget: £110,090
- Box office: £104,920 (UK)

Man on the Run is a 1949 British film noir directed, written and produced by Lawrence Huntington, and starring Derek Farr, Joan Hopkins, Edward Chapman, Kenneth More and Laurence Harvey.

== Plot ==
Peter Burden, an army deserter, still a fugitive in post-war Britain, wanders into a pawn shop robbery and finds himself mistakenly wanted for murder. Forced to go on the run while attempting to prove his innocence, he meets a war widow who helps him to elude the police while he looks for the real criminals.

== Cast ==
- Derek Farr as Sergeant Peter Burden, alias Brown
- Joan Hopkins as Jean Adams
- Edward Chapman as Chief Inspector Mitchell
- Laurence Harvey as Detective Sergeant Lawson
- Howard Marion-Crawford as 1st paratrooper
- Alfie Bass as Bert the barge mate
- John Bailey as Dan Underwood, burglar
- John Stuart as Detective Inspector Jim McBane
- Edward Underdown as Slim Elfey, burglar missing fingers
- Leslie Perrins as Charlie the fence
- Kenneth More as Corporal Newman the blackmailer
- Martin Miller as Tony, cafe proprietor
- Cameron Hall as Reg Hawkins
- Eleanor Summerfield as May Baker, Anchor Hotel
- Anthony Nicholls as station Inspector (Wapping)
- Valentine Dyall as Army Judge advocate
- Howard Douglas as Sweeny (the bargee)
- Laurence Ray as Andy
- Bruce Belfrage as BBC announcer
- Robert Adair as Morgan
- Charles Paton as 2nd hand clothes shop proprietor
- Basil Cunard as 2nd pub type (Soho pub)
- Jack McNaughton as 1st pub type (Soho pub)
- Virginia Winter as 1st barmaid (Soho pub)
- Margaret Goodman as Rosa
- La lage Lewis as Lily
- Patrick Barr as plain clothes man (cab scene)
- Gerald Case as policeman (Waterloo Bridge)
- John Boxer as radio control officer
- Roy Russell as Mobile Police Sergeant
- R Stuart Lindsell as Elliott
- Arthur Mullard as man standing at the bar (uncredited)

== Reception ==
=== Box office ===
As of 1 April 1950 the film earned distributor's gross receipts of £64,453 in the UK, of which £35,947 went to the producer. The film made a loss of £74,142.

=== Critical ===
The Monthly Film Bulletin wrote: "Although this film has good atmosphere provided by the authentic setting in Soho, it is singularly lacking in enterprise and originality, and fails to maintain the suspense and excitement of the opening sequence. This might have been a swift exciting chase film if lengthy moralising on the highly controversial subject of clemency for deserters had been avoided, and tasteful subtlety shewn by leaving the hero's reason for deserting to our imagination, instead of explaining his behaviour with maudlin sentimental excuses. The unnecessary inclusion of the court-martial after the climax of the film results in pure bathos."

Kine Weekly wrote: "Obviously inspired by the Antiquis murder, it leans somewhat heavily on the long arm of coincidence, but smooth acting and direction enable it to put up a good case for the harassed hero and underline its point with well-timed thrills."

Picture Show wrote: "Vigorously acted and directed, this is a topical melodrama of an Army deserter. It is exciting and romantic, even if at times a little far-fetched."

In British Sound Films: The Studio Years 1928–1959 David Quinlan rated the film as "average", writing: "Pacy thrills and spills if not much credibility."
