= Paul Soskin =

British screenwriter (1905–1975)

- Born: 23 February 1905; Kerch, Crimea; Russian Empire
- Died: 15 July 1975 (aged 70); Westminster, England
- Occupations: Producer, Screenwriter
- Years active: 1935 - 1958 (film)

Paul Soskin (23 February 1905 – 15 July 1975) was a Russian-born British screenwriter and film producer. Soskin was born in the Crimea, which was then part of the Russian Empire. His first few films in Britain were low-budget quota quickies, but his breakthrough came with the 1941 comedy Quiet Wedding starring Margaret Lockwood. In 1948, he produced director Roy Ward Baker's drama The Weaker Sex for Two Cities Films.

His daughter Tatiana married Roddy Llewellyn.

== Filmography ==
- Ten Minute Alibi (1935)
- While Parents Sleep (1935)
- Two's Company (1936)
- Quiet Wedding (1941)
- The Day Will Dawn (1942)
- The Weaker Sex (1948)
- Waterfront (1950)
- High Treason (1951)
- Top of the Form (1953)
- All for Mary (1955)
- Happy Is the Bride (1958)
- Law and Disorder (1958)

== Bibliography ==
- Mayer, Geoff. Roy Ward Baker. Manchester University Press, 2004.
