= Double Confession =

1950 British film by Ken Annakin

- Directed by: Ken Annakin
- Screenplay by: William Templeton
- Based on: All on a Summer's Day by John Garden
- Produced by: Harry Reynolds
- Starring: Derek Farr; Joan Hopkins; Peter Lorre; William Hartnell; Naunton Wayne; Ronald Howard; Leslie Dwyer; Kathleen Harrison
- Cinematography: Geoffrey Unsworth
- Edited by: Carmen Belaieff
- Music by: Benjamin Frankel
- Production company: Harry Reynolds Productions
- Distributed by: Associated British
- Release date: 1 May 1950
- Running time: 81 minutes
- Country: United Kingdom
- Language: English
- Box office: £102,299 (UK)

Double Confession is a 1950 British crime film directed by Ken Annakin and starring Derek Farr, Joan Hopkins, William Hartnell and Peter Lorre. The screenplay by William Templeton is based on the 1949 novel All On A Summer's Day by H.L.V. Fletcher (under the pen name John Garden).

== Plot ==
Arriving late at night in the (fictional) seaside town of Seagate, Jim Medway heads for his estranged wife Lorna's isolated coastal cottage. As he arrives, he sees prominent local businessman Charlie Durham coming out of the house. Knowing that Lorna had been having an affair with Charlie, did Jim Medway kill her, or was it Charlie – or someone else entirely?

The next day Jim meets Ann Corday, a young woman with a big decision to make in her life: whether to keep her baby daughter or give her up for adoption. Jim enjoys her company and wants to spend time with her, but she overhears him telling Charlie that he killed Lorna but plans to tell the police Charlie did so. This makes her decide to leave; but later, when they meet up again, she agrees to spend the day with him, having come to believe that he killed Lorna in a moment of madness.

She finally tells him that she knows about Lorna, and that she realises that because of her death there is no future for her and Jim, but that she wanted them both to have a day to remember. However, she does not approve of his exacting revenge on Charlie by attempting to get the wealthy entrepreneur arrested for murdering Lorna, although he assures her he will not let Charlie take the blame: he only wants to make him suffer for a time.

However, Charlie's sinister homicidal sidekick Paynter is out to protect his friend by arranging a little "accident" for Jim. As Inspector Tenby slowly gathers clues to solve the mystery, he begins to suspect there is a less obvious culprit.

== Cast ==
- Derek Farr as Jim Medway
- Joan Hopkins as Ann Corday
- William Hartnell as Charlie Durham
- Peter Lorre as Paynter
- Naunton Wayne as Inspector Tenby
- Ronald Howard as Hilary Boscombe
- Kathleen Harrison as Kate
- Leslie Dwyer as Leonard
- Edward Rigby as the fisherman
- George Woodbridge as Sergeant Swanton
- Henry Edwards as man in the shelter
- Mona Washbourne as fussy mother
- Vida Hope as Madam Zilia
- Esma Cannon as Madame Cleo
- Andrew Leigh as the reserved man
- Fred Griffiths as the spiv
- Jane Griffith as first girl
- Diana Connell as second girl
- Hal Osmond as gallery attendant
- Norman Astridge as Selby
- Roy Plomley as ticket collector
- Jennifer Cross as fussy mother's child
- Betty Nelson as girl at shooting gallery
- Sidney Vivian as ring stall attendant
- Grace Denbeigh-Russell as nosey woman

== Production ==
The film was made at the Teddington Studios of Warner Brothers in London with extensive location shooting in Bexhill-on-Sea and nearby Hastings in East Sussex. The film's sets were designed by the art director Bernard Robinson.

It was one of two films Ken Annakin made on loan out from Gainsborough Pictures to Associated British, the other being Landfall (1949). Annakin wrote "Neither had very good scripts, nor exciting casting... except for Peter Lorre" who was in Double Confession. Annakin admired Lorre so much he allowed "him to play his role in an offbeat, unconventional way" but "the result was that the film was pulled completely out of joint. Lorre stole every scene and acted like the boss of the casino instead of the henchman!" Annakin says Bill Hartnell, who played Lorre's character Paynter's boss Charlie Durham, "was driven, quite justifiably, to bitter anger and even blows. I learned the hard way that a director must guard against allowing a gimmicky actor to add so much 'shtick' that he throws the balance of the whole film."

== Releases ==
Double Confession is missing from the BFI National Archive, and is included on the British Film Institute's list of "75 Most Wanted". A complete 35mm print does exist in an independent archive in the UK. In February 2013, a restored edition was released on DVD by Renown Pictures in the UK.

== Critical reception ==
In contemporary reviews Kine Weekly said "The film has a very involved story and to make matters worse it keeps breaking off to tour the popular seaside resorts where it was shot. This, together with its colourless 'tarnished lady' love interest, takes much of the sting out of many an intended thrill."

Monthly Film Bulletin wrote "Melodrama with an extremely confused plot involving two murders at a seaside resort. ... The film does not even remain true to its melodramatic plot, but breaks off into touches of stereotyped humour from Kathleen Harrison, and prolonged tours of the various entertainments of the seaside town."

In British Sound Films: The Studio Years 1928–1959 David Quinlan rated the film as "mediocre", writing: "Thriller seems to have bewildered most reviewers: one remarked that it told him more about Bexhill and Hastings than its own plot."

Leslie Halliwell said: "Confused and unlikely melodrama which signally lacks the ancient mariner's eye."

In The New York Times, Bosley Crowther commented, "it rambles around in maddening fashion for what seems interminable hours while Naunton Wayne as a deadpanned detective tries to figure out who killed whom...It is all very odd and disconnected, especially when Peter Lorre pops in from time to time to behave like a degenerate and offer to kill anybody in the house"; while more recently AllMovie wrote, "The presence of Peter Lorre assured a modicum of American business for the British meller Double Confession...Lorre's role is largely peripheral, but he does supply a few moments of genuine menace".

Sky Movies wrote, "Director Ken Annakin showed in an earlier film, Holiday Camp [1947], that he liked to be beside the seaside. But, in this superior crime drama, he makes the resort of 'Seagate' appear a very sinister place indeed. The whodunnit plot benefits enormously from Peter Lorre's almost apologetic menace"; and The Digital Fix concluded, "it's an excellent piece of work. Tightly constructed, exceptionally well-performed and with a wonderful sense of place, Double Confession deserves to find an enthusiastic audience."
