= Two's Company (film) =

- Directed by: Tim Whelan
- Written by: John Paddy Carstairs; Thomas J. Geraghty; Sydney Horler (novel); J.B. Morton; Roland Pertwee; Tim Whelan
- Produced by: Paul Soskin
- Starring: Ned Sparks; Gordon Harker; Mary Brian
- Cinematography: Freddie Young
- Production company: British and Dominions
- Distributed by: United Artists
- Release date: 12 October 1936
- Running time: 64 minutes
- Country: United Kingdom
- Language: English

Two's Company is a 1936 British comedy film directed by Tim Whelan and starring Ned Sparks, Gordon Harker and Mary Brian.

It was made at British and Dominions Elstree Studios.

== Plot ==
An American millionaire rents a country house from an English aristocrat and the two constantly fight. However, their children have secretly fallen in love.

== Cast ==
- Ned Sparks as Al
- Gordon Harker as Muggridge
- Mary Brian as Julia Madison
- Patric Knowles as Lord Jerry Wendower
- Henry Holman as B. G. Madison
- Olive Blakeney as Mrs. Madison
- Morton Selten as Earl of Warke
- Robb Wilton as Mr. Muddlecombe
- Gibb McLaughlin as Toombs
- H. F. Maltby as Otto Stump
- Syd Crossley as Ives
- Robert Nainby as Assistant J.P.

== Bibliography ==
- Low, Rachael. Filmmaking in 1930s Britain. George Allen & Unwin, 1985.
- Wood, Linda. British Films, 1927-1939. British Film Institute, 1986.
