= Happy Is the Bride =

1958 British film by Roy Boulting

- British theatrical poster
- Directed by: Roy Boulting
- Screenplay by: Roy Boulting; Jeffrey Dell
- Based on: play Quiet Wedding by Esther McCracken.
- Produced by: Paul Soskin
- Starring: Ian Carmichael; Janette Scott; Cecil Parker
- Cinematography: Edward Scaife
- Edited by: Anthony Harvey
- Music by: Benjamin Frankel
- Production company: Paul Soskin Productions (as Panther)
- Distributed by: British Lion Films (UK)
- Release date: 4 March 1958
- Running time: 84 minutes
- Country: United Kingdom
- Language: English

Happy Is the Bride is a 1958 black and white British comedy film written and directed by Roy Boulting and starring Ian Carmichael, Janette Scott, Cecil Parker, Terry-Thomas and Joyce Grenfell. It is based on the 1938 play Quiet Wedding by Esther McCracken, previously filmed in 1941.

== Plot ==
In a quiet summer corner of Wiltshire that is forever England, David and Janet decide to tie the knot. However, this serves as the signal for everyone else to assume control of the situation, much to the couple's dismay and the father of Janet's growing despondency. One way or another the wedding – if there is one – is going to be an unforgettable occasion.

== Cast ==
- Ian Carmichael as David Chaytor
- Janette Scott as Janet Royd
- Cecil Parker as Arthur Royd
- Terry-Thomas as policeman
- Joyce Grenfell as Aunt Florence
- Eric Barker as vicar
- Edith Sharpe as Mildred Royd
- Elvi Hale as Petula
- Miles Malleson as 1st magistrate
- Athene Seyler as Aunt Harriet
- Irene Handl as Mme. Edna
- John Le Mesurier as Chaytor
- Thorley Walters as Jim
- Nicholas Parsons as John Royd
- Virginia Maskell as Marcia
- Brian Oulton as 2nd magistrate
- Joan Hickson as Mrs. Bowles
- Cardew Robinson as George the verger
- Sam Kydd as foreman
- Arthur Mullard as house redecorator (uncredited)

== Production ==
Sylvia Syms was originally meant to play the female lead but pulled out. Filming started May 1957.

== Reception ==
=== Critical ===
The Monthly Film Bulletin wrote: "Anthony Asquith's pre-war version of Quiet Wedding had a slight but friendly charm.This frantic remake has only a fraction of the earlier film's virtues; it is altogether a badly managed affair, lacking real wit, style or grace. An exaggerated comedy of absurdities, most of them are pushed too stridently for success. Miles Malleson and Terry-Thomas, as a deaf magistrate and a rural policeman respectively, have their moments, however."

Leonard Maltin called the film a "mild farce".

Bosley Crowther in The New York Times wrote, "Mr. Boulting has assembled and directed a typically fine British cast, which plays the farcical proceedings with skill and apparent enjoyment...all the characters are amusing. That's usually the way in a Boulting film."

=== Box office ===
Kinematograph Weekly listed it as being "in the money" at the British box office in 1958. It was one of the twelve most popular films of the year in Britain.
