= John Stone (actor) =

Welsh actor (1924–2007)

- Stone in The Avengers 1964
- Born: John Hailstone
- Occupation: Actor

John Stone (born John Hailstone; 26 May 1924 – 2007) was a Welsh actor.

== Early life ==
Born in Cardiff, Glamorgan, Wales, Stone was educated at Brighton College. He served in the Royal Air Force and began his career as a journalist.

== Career ==
Stone soon switched to acting and only appeared on the stage until 1945, when he joined the BBC Repertory Company. He made his first West End appearance in One Wild Oat by Vernon Sylvaine, 1948. Subsequent appearances include the London premiere of Arthur Miller's A View from the Bridge, Comedy Theatre, 1956; And Suddenly it's Spring, Duke of York's Theatre, 1959; Signpost to Murder, Cambridge Theatre, 1962; and the role of Crestwell, the laconic butler, in Noël Coward's Relative Values, Westminster Theatre, 1973.

Stone was under contract to Rank as one of the Sydney Box Company of Youth ("Charm School") in the late 1940s. Film credits include The Weaker Sex (dir. Roy Baker), 1948; The Frightened City, 1961; Masque of the Red Death (dir. Roger Corman), 1964; Deadlier Than the Male (1967); and You Only Live Twice (1967).

Stone was a familiar face on British television from the 1950s-1980s, and featured as Captain John Dillon in Quatermass II (1955). In 1957, he starred as special agent, Mike Anson, in an early ITV thriller series, Destination Downing Street (Associated Rediffusion), which ran for 26 weeks. His 1964 appearance in The Avengers was followed in 1967 when he appeared in the series' episode entitled "the Joker" as Major John Fancy. From 1971 to 1974 Stone played Dr Ian Moody in the Yorkshire Television series, Justice, opposite Margaret Lockwood, his offscreen partner of seventeen years. Subsequently, he appeared in the BBC series, Flesh and Blood (1980–82) and Strike it Rich (1986/87).

Under his birth name of John Hailstone, Stone wrote A Present for the Past, a play premiered at the Royal Lyceum Theatre, Edinburgh, as part of the Edinburgh International Festival of 1966. It starred Wendy Hiller, Renee Asherson, and Gwen Ffrangcon-Davies, and was produced by Michael Codron.

== Personal life ==
Stone married the actress Lian-Shin Yang in 1958. She died in 1970.

== Filmography ==
Year	Title	Role	Notes
1945	Johnny Frenchman	Sam Harvey	
1946	Night Boat to Dublin	Young Newlywed	Uncredited
1947	The Upturned Glass	Male Student	Uncredited
1947	Holiday Camp	Detective #2	
1948	My Brother's Keeper	Wainwright's Assistant	Uncredited
1948	Colonel Bogey	Wilfred Barriteau	
1948	The Weaker Sex	Sgt. Roddy McIntyre	
1948	The Blind Goddess	Sir John's Junior	
1949	The Bad Lord Byron	Lord Clark	
1956	Reach for the Sky	Limping Officer	Uncredited
1956	X the Unknown	Jerry	Uncredited
1957	Operation Murder	Inspector Price	
1958	Moment of Indiscretion	Eric	
1961	The Frightened City	Hood	
1964	Masque of the Red Death	Guard	Uncredited
1967	Deadlier Than the Male	Wyngarde	
1967	You Only Live Twice	Submarine Captain	
1968	A Testing Job ( Educational Short Film )	Driving Instructor	Uncredited
1969	Doppelgänger	London Delegate	
1971	Assault	Fire Chief	
1993	Merlin	Mordred	
