= No Medals =

1944 play by Esther McCracken

Fay Compton, Pauline Tennant & Valerie White in the original London production

No Medals is a play by the British writer Esther McCracken first staged in 1944. Its West End run at the Vaudeville Theatre lasted for 740 performances between 4 October 1944 and 19 July 1946. It depicts the struggles of a middle-class British housewife during the war years. The original cast included Fay Compton and Frederick Leister while Thora Hird appeared in a comic relief role as servant in her first London performance.

== Film adaptation ==
In 1948 it was turned into a film The Weaker Sex with McCracken working on the adaptation herself. Directed by Roy Ward Baker, it starred Ursula Jeans, Cecil Parker and Joan Hopkins. Only Thora Hird reprised her role from the original production.

== Bibliography ==
- Wearing, J. P. The London Stage 1940–1949: A Calendar of Productions, Performers, and Personnel. Rowman & Littlefield, 2014.
