= The Chiltern Hundreds (film) =

1949 British film by John Paddy Carstairs

- Theatrical release poster
- Directed by: John Paddy Carstairs
- Screenplay by: William Douglas-Home; Patrick Kirwan
- Based on: the play The Chiltern Hundreds by William Douglas-Home
- Produced by: George H. Brown
- Starring: Cecil Parker; A. E. Matthews; David Tomlinson; Lana Morris
- Cinematography: Jack Hildyard
- Edited by: George Clark
- Music by: Benjamin Frankel; Muir Mathieson
- Production company: George H. Brown Productions (for) Two Cities Films
- Distributed by: General Film Distributors (UK)
- Release date: 27 September 1949; (London) (UK)
- Running time: 84 minutes
- Country: United Kingdom
- Language: English

The Chiltern Hundreds (released in the U.S. as The Amazing Mr. Beecham) is a 1949 British politically-themed comedy film directed by John Paddy Carstairs and starring Lana Morris, David Tomlinson and Cecil Parker. It was written by William Douglas-Home and Patrick Kirwan, adapted from Douglas-Home's 1947 play of the same name.

== Synopsis ==
Viscount Pym, whilst on National Service, gets leave from the British Army on the pretext of standing for Parliament as a Conservative Party candidate in his home constituency, held by his family for generations. The request is a ruse to enable Pym to marry his wealthy American fiancée June Farrell while she is still in England and before she has to return home to America. His master plan backfires when he finds himself swept into the election campaign and beaten by the more politically experienced Mr Cleghorn, the Labour Party candidate.

After losing the election, his family take the news calmly, but his fiancée is mortified, and he must now devise a plan to win her back. When Cleghorn is made a peer, Viscount Pym stands again for the newly vacant seat, however this time he fights the campaign as a Socialist candidate but is beaten once again, this time by the family butler Beecham – a steadfast Conservative.

The title of the original play and the British title of this film refers to a Parliamentary convention which applies when a Member of Parliament wishes to stand down. Since MPs cannot technically resign, they may apply for the office of Crown Steward and Bailiff of the Chiltern Hundreds instead, which is an 'office of profit under the Crown': holding such a position disqualifies them from serving as an MP.

== Cast ==
- Cecil Parker as Beecham (the butler)
- A. E. Matthews as Earl of Lister
- David Tomlinson as Tony, Viscount Pym
- Lana Morris as Bessie Sykes (the maid)
- Marjorie Fielding as The Countess of Lister
- Tom Macaulay as Cleghorn
- Joyce Carey as Lady Caroline (Lord Lister's sister)
- Helen Backlin as June Farrell
- Gerald Anderson as Mr. Brown
- Michael Brennan as Sergeant
- Robert Cawdron as Sergeant
- Cyril Chamberlain as sentry
- Peggy Ann Clifford as mother
- Charles Cullum as Colonel
- Richard Dunn as Labour agent
- Ambrosine Phillpotts as Lady Fielding
- Bill Shine as reporter
- Joan Hopkins as flower show attendee
- Anthony Steel as Adjutant
- Dervis Ward as driver

== Production ==
The film was made for £109,000.

== Critical reception ==
The Monthly Film Bulletin wrote: "An entertaining and well-paced adaptation of the successful stage comedy about politics and the landed gentry."

Picture Show wrote: "Hilarious comedy.... Witty and amusing dialogue is perfectly delivered by a chosen cast, in which Cecil Parker, as the butler, gives a magnificent performance, and is run close by A.E. Matthews, whose portrayal of Lord Lister is a joy."

Variety wrote: "Although bearing obvious resemblance to its stage origin ... it is a smooth production, relying more on characterization than story, and told with a neat turn of comedy. ... At times, the action moves slowly, but the dialog is full of punch, the casting is first-rate, and the lensing and editing are up to standard."

Bosley Crowther in The New York Times noted "a somewhat slapdash lot of fooling. It rambles all over the place and is perilously uneven in its humorous attack. But it does offer several stinging sideswipes at the "plutocrats, peers and parasites," and kids class distinctions and traditions in a pleasantly good-natured way. In the title role of the butler, Cecil Parker – he who played the pompous colonel in the last episode of Quartet – is delightfully foolish and mannered, but A. E. Matthews as the butler's ranking boss, a beautifully addle-brained old codger, runs away with the show. Mr. Matthews' illustration of the complacence of an impoverished earl may not be wholly consistent but it glistens brightly in spots. David Tomlinson also does nicely as the thoroughly light-weight young lord and Lana Morris, Tom Macaulay and Marjorie Fielding are amusing in other roles."
