= Quiet Wedding =

1941 British film by Anthony Asquith

- Directed by: Anthony Asquith
- Written by: Anatole de Grunwald; Terence Rattigan
- Based on: Quiet Wedding by Esther McCracken
- Produced by: Paul Soskin
- Starring: Margaret Lockwood; Derek Farr; Marjorie Fielding; David Tomlinson
- Cinematography: Bernard Knowles
- Edited by: Reginald Beck
- Music by: Nicholas Brodzsky
- Production company: Conqueror Productions
- Distributed by: Paramount British Pictures; Universal Pictures
- Release date: 19 April 1941
- Running time: 80 minutes
- Country: United Kingdom
- Language: English

Quiet Wedding is a 1941 British romantic comedy film directed by Anthony Asquith and starring Margaret Lockwood, Derek Farr and Marjorie Fielding. The screenplay was written by Terence Rattigan and Anatole de Grunwald based on the play Quiet Wedding by Esther McCracken. The film was remade in 1958 as Happy Is the Bride.

== Plot ==
A young couple become engaged, but undergo a number of misadventures before their wedding ceremony.

== Cast ==
- Margaret Lockwood as Janet Royd
- Derek Farr as Dallas Chaytor
- Marjorie Fielding as Mildred Royd
- A. E. Matthews as Arthur Royd
- Athene Seyler as Aunt Mary
- Jean Cadell as Aunt Florence
- Margaretta Scott as Marcia
- David Tomlinson as John Royd
- Sidney King as Denys
- Peggy Ashcroft as Flower Lisle
- Frank Cellier as Mr. Clayton
- Roland Culver as Boofy Ponsonby
- Michael Shepley as Marcia's husband
- Muriel Pavlow as Miranda
- Margaret Halstan as Lady Yeldham
- Roddy Hughes as vicar
- O. B. Clarence as first magistrate
- Margaret Rutherford as second magistrate
- Wally Patch as third magistrate
- Martita Hunt as Madame Mirelle, the dressmaker
- Charles Carson as Johnson
- Bernard Miles as constable
- Terry-Thomas (uncredited) as extra

== Production ==
It was Lockwood's first film following a series of films with Carol Reed.

== Critical reception ==
The Monthly Film Bulletin wrote: "Advantage has rightly been taken of war-time conditions to gather more actors and actresses generally acknowledged to be great artists than would have been financially possible in peace-time, and to that number has been added a sprinkling of lesser known players who, from their performance in this film, will soon join the ranks of their more famous colleagues. The photography, sound-recording, and décor leaves nothing for the fault-finder, and the producer has welded his material into something worth while. But over and above material and individual, there is the inspired direction of Anthony Asquith. No subtlety of glance, movement or dialogue has been missed, no possible highlight omitted."

The New York Times wrote, "a foreword to the film states that its production was interrupted five times when Nazi bombs exploded on the studio, but all their destructive fury has left no visible mark on the quiet humor and the atmosphere of hearthside warmth that permeate this wisp of a tale about a young couple on the eve of their marriage...Anthony Asquith has directed with tender appreciation of his material this completely unpretentious and charming film, the component parts of which are as delicately balanced as the mechanism of a watch."

Leslie Halliwell wrote: "A semi-classic British stage comedy is admirably filmed with a splendid cast."
