= Joan Hopkins =

British actress (1915–2002)

- Born: Phyllis Joan Hopkins; 31 August 1915; Wandsworth, London, England
- Died: 27 December 2002 (aged 87); Greenwich, London, England
- Education: Royal Academy of Dramatic Art
- Occupation: Actress
- Years active: 1943–1954 (film & TV)
- Spouse: Henry Cass

Joan Hopkins (31 August 1915 – 27 December 2002) was a British stage and film actress. During the late 1940s, she appeared in starring roles in several productions, including as Princess Charlotte in The First Gentleman and as Helen in the box office success The Weaker Sex (both in 1948). Her final appearance was in the 1950 thriller Double Confession. After this, she appeared on television for several years. She was married to the film director, Henry Cass.

== Filmography ==
- We Dive at Dawn (1943)
- Temptation Harbour (1947)
- The First Gentleman (1948)
- The Affairs of a Rogue (1948)
- The Weaker Sex (1948)
- Man on the Run (1949)
- The Chiltern Hundreds (1949)
- Double Confession (1950)

== Bibliography ==
- Brian McFarlane & Anthony Slide. The Encyclopedia of British Film: Fourth Edition. Oxford University Press, 2013.
- Philip Gillett. Forgotten British Film: Value and the Ephemeral in Postwar Cinema. Cambridge Scholars Publishing, 2017.
