= Virginia Maskell =

English actress (1936–1968)

- Born: Virginia Elizabeth Maskell; 27 February 1936; Shepherd's Bush, London, England
- Died: 25 January 1968 (aged 31); Aylesbury, Buckinghamshire, England
- Occupation: Actress
- Years active: 1957–68
- Spouse: Geoffrey Shakerley (m. 1962–1968) (her death)
- Children: 2

Virginia Elizabeth Maskell (27 February 1936 – 25 January 1968), was an English actress.

== Early life and education ==
Virginia Maskell was born in Shepherd's Bush, London, daughter of William Eric Brands Maskell, of Little Down, Duncton, Sussex. After the outbreak of the Second World War, Maskell's family was evacuated to South Africa. After the war she returned to London and entered a convent school, where she developed an interest in acting.

== Career ==
After attending drama school she featured in television roles, mainly playing demure young women in action series such as The Buccaneers and The Adventures of Robin Hood.

Her film debut was a minor role for director Roy Boulting in Happy Is the Bride (1957), and then began switching between the theatre and the screen. In director Pat Jackson's comedy Virgin Island (US: Our Virgin Island, 1958), she appeared with John Cassavetes and Sidney Poitier. She gained a British Lion contract and appeared in The Man Upstairs (1958) and as an air hostess in Jet Storm (1959).

She made an impact on the stage in Ronald Duncan's The Catalyst, a play that initially the Lord Chamberlain's office had found troubling. There were distinguished appearances in live TV drama. Soon she starred in Doctor in Love (1960), and as Peter Sellers's wife in Only Two Can Play (1962); Sellers was unconvinced she could manage a credible Welsh accent and asked for her dismissal, though it was suspected that his ulterior motive was to replace Maskell with Welsh-born actress Siân Phillips.

She took a break from acting from 1962 to concentrate on her family, acted occasionally in TV series as Danger Man and The Prisoner, and returned after the birth of her second son to shoot Interlude (1968) in the summer of 1967. Interlude was released after she died, and she won a posthumous National Board of Review award and a BAFTA nomination for her work in the film.

Maskell was also a poet and an artist.

== Personal life ==
Maskell married Sir Geoffrey Adam Shakerley, 6th Baronet on 3 July 1962. The couple had two sons.

== Death ==
After the birth of her second son in February 1966, Maskell showed signs of post-natal depression. Following the shooting of Interlude in the summer of 1967, she suffered a severe nervous breakdown and was hospitalised at Stoke Mandeville Hospital for six weeks.

On Wednesday, 24 January 1968, she left home in her car and, six hours later, her husband reported her missing. Police searched woods 700 feet up in the Chiltern Hills after her car was found a mile from her home. Maskell apparently had wandered through the woods for hours before collapsing where the police eventually found her. She was taken to hospital and given emergency treatment for an overdose of barbiturates but, although doctors revived her, she died the following day.

== Quotations ==
- "I love acting, but I also want to be alive. Publicity is like a prison. If you're not careful, you begin to live according to everyone's idea of how you ought to live. Ambition? To be a big, big star...on the stage."

== Filmography ==
- Carve Her Name with Pride (1958) – Wren
- Happy Is the Bride (1958) – Marcia
- The Man Upstairs (1958) – Helen Grey
- Virgin Island (1958) – Tina
- Jet Storm (1959) – Pam Leyton
- Doctor in Love (1960) – Dr. Nicola Barrington
- Suspect (1960) – Dr. Lucy Byrne
- Only Two Can Play (1962) – Jean Lewis
- The Wild and the Willing (1962) – Virginia Chown
- Danger Man – "The Colonel's Daughter" – Joanna Blakeley (1964)
- Gideon's Way (1965) – "The White Rat" – Rose
- The Prisoner (1967) – Episode One, "Arrival"
- Interlude (1968) – Antonia
