= Esther McCracken =

British actress and playwright (1902–1971)

- Photo by John Gay, 1949
- Born: Esther Helen Armstrong; 25 June 1902; Newcastle upon Tyne, England
- Died: 9 August 1971 (aged 69); London, England
- Occupations: Playwright; actress

Esther Helen McCracken (née Armstrong; 25 June 1902 – 9 August 1971) was a British actress and playwright.

== Biography ==
She was born Esther Helen Armstrong in Newcastle upon Tyne on 25 June 1902 and was educated at the Central Newcastle High School, where she won the cricket-ball throwing competition every year.

From 1929, she acted with the Newcastle Repertory Company. Her first play The Willing Spirit was produced in 1936. It was her second play, Quiet Wedding, in 1938, which made her reputation as a writer of domestic comedy and took her to London. It was later filmed by Anthony Asquith in 1941, and by Roy Boulting in 1958, as Happy Is the Bride.

Her next plays, The Willing Spirit in 1936, Counter Attraction in 1938, and White Elephants in 1940, were less successful, but Quiet Weekend, in 1941, surpassed her earlier success and ran for over a thousand performances. It was filmed in 1946.

She married Angus McCracken, a famous northern rugby player and accountant in 1936, but he was killed in action in Naples, Italy in 1943. In the following year, she married Mungo Campbell, the shipping magnate. She went on to introduce the BBC radio variety programme Wot Cheor Geordie, which ran from 1940 to 1956. The signature tune was the very popular "Wherever ye gaan, you're sure to meet a Geordie". She also wrote more serious plays in her later career, including Living Room in 1943, No Medals in 1944 (filmed as The Weaker Sex), and Cry Liberty in 1950.

The initials of McCracken, her husband and a friend are included in the name of MEA House in Ellison Place, Newcastle, which was set up through their efforts. This is the first British building purpose-built to house a range of voluntary services.

She died in August 1971. The actress Imogen Stubbs is her granddaughter.
