= The Chiltern Hundreds (play) =

1947 stage comedy by William Douglas-Home

Programme for original production

The Chiltern Hundreds is a 1947 English-language stage comedy by William Douglas-Home, which ran for 651 performances at London's Vaudeville Theatre. It was adapted as a film in 1949, under the same title. Revivals of the play have included a 1999 production, also at the Vaudeville, starring Edward Fox.

A sequel The Manor of Northstead followed in 1954.

== Original cast ==
- Beecham - Michael Shepley
- Bessie - Diane Hart
- June Farrell - Leora Dana
- June Farrell (Replacement) - Joan Winmill
- Lady Caroline Smith - Edith Savile
- Lord Pym - Peter Coke
- Mr Cleghorn - Tom Macaulay
- The Countess of Lister - Marjorie Fielding
- The Earl of Lister - A E Matthews
