= Quiet Wedding (play) =

1938 play by Esther McCracken

Frank Lawton and Elizabeth Allan in the original London production

Quiet Wedding is a 1938 comedy play in three acts by the British writer Esther McCracken. A young couple's plans for their wedding are undermined by the constant interruptions of their relatives. A sequel Quiet Weekend was written in 1941 and proved to be even more successful.

== Film adaptations ==
In 1941 a film adaptation Quiet Wedding was directed by Anthony Asquith, starring Margaret Lockwood, Derek Farr and Marjorie Fielding. A further version appeared in 1958 as Happy Is the Bride, directed by Roy Boulting.

== Radio adaptation ==
Quiet Wedding was presented on Theatre Guild on the Air 3 May 1953. The one-hour adaptation starred Diana Lynn, John Dall, and Jessie Royce Landis.
