= Angel Pavement (1957 TV series) =

1957 British TV drama series

- Genre: Drama
- Based on: Angel Pavement by J.B. Priestley
- Written by: Constance Cox
- Directed by: John Jacobs
- Starring: Maurice Denham; Sydney Tafler
- Country of origin: United Kingdom
- Original language: English
- No. of series: 1
- No. of episodes: 4 (all missing)

Production
- Producer: John Jacobs
- Running time: 30 minutes
- Production company: BBC

Original release
- Network: BBC Television Service
- Release: 27 December 1957 – 17 January 1958

Angel Pavement is a British television drama series which first aired on BBC Television Service between 27 December 1957 and 17 January 1958. It is an adaptation of the 1930 novel Angel Pavement by J.B. Priestley. It follows the fortunes of a small London-based company just before the outbreak of the Great Depression.

A second television adaptation of the novel was produced by the BBC in 1967. Both adaptations are considered completely lost.

== Main cast ==
- Maurice Denham as Mr. Smeeth
- Sydney Tafler as Mr. Golspie
- Catherine Feller as Lena Golspie
- Margaret Tyzack as Miss Matfield
- Anthony Sharp as Mr. Dersingham
- Alec McCowen as Turgis
- Maureen Pryor as Mrs. Smeeth
- Robert Vahey as George Smeeth
- Irene Handl as Mrs. Mitty
- Robert Scroggins as Stanley Poole
- Edwina Rendell as Poppy Sellars
- Ursula Jenkins as Edna Smeeth
- Hilda Barry as Mrs. Pelumpton
- Colin Douglas as Fred Mitty
- Thomas Gallagher as Captain
- Nan Marriott-Watson as Charwoman
- Derek Nimmo as Young Man

== Bibliography ==
- Ellen Baskin. Serials on British Television, 1950-1994. Scolar Press, 1996.
