= Angel Pavement (1967 TV series) =

British TV series

- Genre: Drama
- Based on: Angel Pavement by J. B. Priestley
- Written by: David Turner
- Directed by: Paddy Russell
- Starring: Anthony Bate; Murray Melvin; Cyril Luckham
- Country of origin: United Kingdom
- Original language: English
- No. of series: 1
- No. of episodes: 4 (all missing)

Production
- Producer: David Conroy
- Running time: 45 minutes
- Production company: BBC

Original release
- Network: BBC Two
- Release: 19 August – 9 September 1967

Angel Pavement is a British television drama series which first aired on BBC 2 between 19 August and 9 September 1967. It is an adaptation of the 1930 novel Angel Pavement by J. B. Priestley, about a small London firm struggling in the early 1930s until the arrival of the mysterious Mr. Golspie revives the fortunes of the company.

Both this and a previous 1957 BBC adaptation are considered completely lost.

== Cast ==
- Anthony Bate as Mr. Golspie
- Murray Melvin as Turgis
- Cyril Luckham as Mr. Smeeth
- Hilda Braid as Mrs. Smeeth
- Tina Martin as Edna Smeeth
- Tony Steedman as Dersingham
- Judy Parfitt as Lilian Matfield
- Jane Bond as Lena Golspie
- Christopher Cooper as Stanley Poole
- Anna Cropper as Miss Cadnam
- Jean Muir as Poppy Sellers
- Erik Chitty as Benenden
- Jan Conrad as Captain
- Faith Kent as Mrs. Dersingham
- Beryl Cooke as Mrs. Pearson
- John Wentworth as Mr. Pearson
- George A. Cooper as Fred Mitty
- Ann Tirard as Miss Verever
- Rita Merkelis as Dot Mitty
- Norah Blaney as Mrs. Mitty
- Cynthia Etherington as Caretaker
- Rose Howlett as Mrs. Cross
- Desmond Jordan as Norman Birtley
- Stephen Rea as Second Mate
- Paula Topham as Miss Ansdell
- Philip Ray as Major Trape

== Bibliography ==
- Ellen Baskin. Serials on British Television, 1950-1994. Scolar Press, 1996.
