= The Desperate Bicycles =

English punk band

- Origin: London, England
- Genre: Punk rock
- Years active: 1977–1980
- Label: Refill
- Past members: Dan Wigley; Nicky Stephens; Roger Stephens; Mel Oxer; Paul LeClerc; David Papworth; Dan Driscoll; Jeff Titley

The Desperate Bicycles were an English punk band from London formed in 1977. They released a series of independent recordings through their own label Refill Records in the late 1970s, encouraging and inspiring many other bands to do likewise. The Desperate Bicycles pioneered the do-it-yourself ethic of punk, adopting a proselytising role exemplified by their ardent exhortation: "it was easy, it was cheap – go and do it!". The group have been described as "DIY's most fervent evangelists".

== History ==
The Desperate Bicycles formed in March 1977 "specifically for the purpose of recording and releasing a single on their own label". The band initially consisted of Nicky Stephens (keyboards), Roger Stephens (bass), Danny Wigley (vocals), Mel Oxer, (drums) and Paul LeClerc (guitar). The band's name derives from a passage in J. B. Priestley’s 1930 novel Angel Pavement:

Turning into Angel Pavement from that crazy jumble of buses, lorries, drays, private cars, and desperate bicycles…

In October 1978 vocalist Danny Wigley expressed the motivation driving the Desperate Bicycles' independent stance: "The biggest hurdle is just believing you’ve still got some control over your life, that you can go out and do it".

=== First single ===
In March 1977 the Desperate Bicycles booked a studio at Dalston in East London to record their first single. The band possessed only an amp and a bass-guitar and the studio supplied the other instruments and equipment; "with a lot of courage and a little rehearsal" they recorded two songs, "Smokescreen" and "Handlebars". The first record was released in August 1977 as an edition of 500 pressings on the band's own Refill Records label. The records cost £153 to produce, which comprised the three hours studio time, the price of pressing and the sleeves. The record was unusual in that it featured the same tracks on both sides and was a mono recording. The song "Handlebars" ends with the Desperate Bicycles' strident DIY rallying cry "it was easy, it was cheap - go and do it!". Roger Stephens and Danny Wrigley hawked the "Smokescreen" single around the small independent record shops, and distributors such as Virgin and Rough Trade. The first pressing sold out within four months resulting in a profit to the band of £210. Using this money a second pressing of 1,000 was made, which sold out in a fortnight. The profit from that was used to finance the pressings of the Desperate Bicycles' second single.

=== Second single ===
The drummer and guitarist had left the band soon after the recording of the "Smokescreen" single, with the drummer being replaced by Dave Papworth, then aged 14 years. The new line-up went back to the studio in June 1977 and recorded another two songs, "The Medium was Tedium" and "Don't Back the Front". The second single was released in February 1978 in a pressing of 1,000 and sold out in a week. "The Medium was Tedium" incorporates "it was easy, it was cheap - go and do it!" as a refrain, urging others to follow the band's example. "Don't Back the Front" contains the lines: "cut it, press it, distribute it / Xerox music's here at last". For the Desperate Bicycles 'do-it-yourself' "meant the overthrow of the establishment music industry through people seizing the means of production, making their own entertainment, and selling it to other creative and autonomous spirits". With the profit from their second single the group pressed a further 2,500 copies of each of their singles, and also purchased some more equipment.

=== Early gigs and subsequent recordings ===
In the second half of 1977, with a single in the market-place, the Desperate Bicycles were invited to perform at Eric's Club in Liverpool. The band were unprepared for a live gig – "Our first purpose was just to make and sell records". But with characteristic enthusiasm and persistence they re-learnt the songs they had recorded and wrote a batch of new ones. They set up a rehearsal room at 106 Erlanger Rd, New Cross in South London in order to practice the new material. This was in the basement and sound proofed with cardboard eggboxes. On New Year's Eve 1977 the Desperate Bicycles hired a van and drove to Liverpool for their first gig at Eric's Club. The New Cross, New Cross EP, consisting of six of the additional songs they had written, was released in May 1978.

The Desperate Bicycles performed sporadically in 1978, including a Rock Against Racism benefit with Sham 69. In July that year they released another single.

By October 1979 Roger Stephens and Dave Papworth were replaced by Dan 'Electro'/Driscoll (guitar) and Geoff Titley (drums), with Nicky Stephens taking up the bass-guitar. The Remorse Code album was released in February 1980, reaching number 10 on the UK Indie Chart. The Desperate Bicycles disbanded in 1981.

In 1981 Danny Wigley and Jeff Titley, with Dennis Burns and Cameron Allan formed a new band Lusty Ghosts, releasing a cassette on the Refill label.

=== Music and legacy ===
The music of the Desperate Bicycles has been described as: "Spindly, fuzzy, guttural guitars through puny amplifiers, reedy, wheezy organs, out of tune electric pianos, cardboard box drums and monotonous declamatory yet somehow utterly reasonable sounding vocals". Another reviewer described them as "a shambling wreck of a psychedelic post-punk band". The writer Simon Reynolds states that the group's music "was almost puritan in its unadorned simplicity, its guitar sound frugal to the point of emaciation".

For the Desperate Bicycles, it was as though sloppiness and scrawniness became signs of membership in the true punk elect. The very deficiency of traditional rock virtues (tightness, feel) stood as tokens of the group's authenticity and purity of intent.

The Desperate Bicycles were a group of amateur musicians who remained determinedly independent. Their enjoyment of the creative and technical processes of making music is revealed in their recordings. The example they set, their energy and enthusiasm and the simple message of "go and do it!", inspired a generation of punk and post-punk bands to follow in their footsteps, in both the UK and further afield. In the years since their dissolution, the bandmembers have remained true to their principles, declining offers for interviews and having their music re-issued.

== Discography ==
- Smokescreen 7-inch single (Refill Records RR-1; August 1977) - "Smokescreen" / "Handlebars".
- The Medium was Tedium 7-inch single (Refill Records RR-2; February 1978) - "The Medium was Tedium" / "Don't Back the Front".
- New Cross, New Cross 7-inch EP (Refill Records RR-3; May 1978) - "(I Make the) Product" / "Paradise Lost" / "Advice on Arrest" / "Holidays" / "The Housewife Song" / "Cars".
- Occupied Territory 7-inch single (Refill Records RR-4; July 1978) - "Occupied Territory" / "Skill".
- John Peel session (July 1978) – "Smokescreen" / "Skill" / "Sarcasm" / "Teacher's Prayer".
- Remorse Code LP (Refill Records RR-6; February 1980) – "I Am Nine" / "Walking the Talking Channel" / "A Can of Lemonade" / "Pretty Little Analyse" / "Acting" / "It’s Somebody’s Birthday Today" / "Sarcasm" / "Trendy Feelings" / "Natural History" / "Blasting Radio".
- Grief is Very Private EP (Refill Records RR-7; 1980) – "Grief is Very Private" / Obstructive" / "Conundrum".
