= Conditioning House =

Defunct public institution in Britain

Coordinates: 53.8011°N 1.7514°W

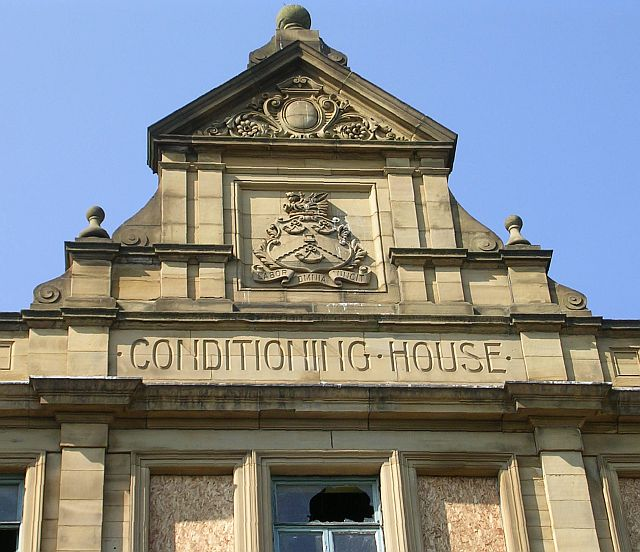
Signage in 2007

The Conditioning House was a public institution in Bradford, Yorkshire, England, which provided independent quality control of wool. It was established by Bradford Corporation in 1887 and in its heyday assessed nearly 70% of the wool in the United Kingdom, in particular its staple length and water content. It closed in the 1980s and stood empty for some 30 years until its conversion into offices and flats was completed in 2024.

== History ==
The Conditioning House was a unique public institution which provided independent quality control of wool. It was established under the Bradford Corporation (Various Powers) Act 1887 (50 & 51 Vict. c. cxxxii), which was entitled:

An Act to enable the mayor aldermen and burgesses of the borough of Bradford to establish and maintain a "Conditioning House" for ascertaining and certifying on behalf of persons so desiring the weight length quality and condition of articles of merchandise used in the Bradford worsted trade and the true weight character quality and condition of wools; to authorize the transfer of the Bradford Fever Hospital to the said mayor aldermen and burgesses; and for other purposes.

The Conditioning House wasn't an isolated case. Around the same time, wool traders across Europe began standardizing how they tested fibre: calibrated equipment, certified results, and shared reference materials all became common. Similar efforts appeared outside the main industrial centres too.

In the early 20th century Bradford was regarded as the world's wool capital, and the Conditioning House examined and certified nearly 70% of the UK's wool production. However, Britain's pre-eminence in textiles declined, and by the 1980s financial losses obliged the council to close the institution, and the building stood empty for three decades. Then between 2016 and 2024 the building was renovated to provide 153 loft-style flats and 19 office suites. The conversion benefitted from a grant of £1.5 million from the Bradford Heritage Building Fund managed by the West Yorkshire Combined Authority.

== The building ==
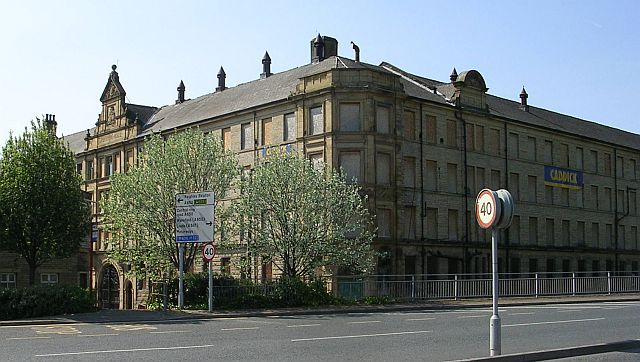
Conditioning House in 2007

To house the institution, Bradford Corporation built an impressive building, which opened in 1902. It stands at the corner of Canal Road with Cape Street, 0.4 miles north of Forster Square station. It was Grade II listed in 1983.

The U-shaped building measures approximately 70 metres by 60 metres, and has four storeys and a basement arranged around three sides of a courtyard (now with a glazed roof). It is built of yellow sandstone to a Queen Anne design by F. Wild, adapted by city architect F. E. P. Edwards.

== In literature ==
Bradford-born author J. B. Priestley refers to the Conditioning House in his 1946 novel Bright Day.

== See also ==
Bradford Count
