= List of Patrick Troughton performances =

Patrick Troughton, c. 1984

Patrick Troughton (1920–1987) was an English actor who worked in the mediums of film, television, stage.

Although best known to modern audiences for portraying the second incarnation of the Doctor in the BBC science fiction series Doctor Who from 1966 to 1969—a role he reprised three times between 1972 and 1985—he was also widely recognised for his work as a character actor in television.

Classically trained, Troughton's early work included appearances in Laurence Olivier's Shakespeare film adaptations Hamlet (1948) and Richard III (1955). He voiced Winston Smith in a 1965 BBC Home Service radio adaptation of Nineteen Eighty-Four.

Prior to Doctor Who, he appeared in numerous TV shows, including The Count of Monte Cristo, Ivanhoe, Dial 999, Danger Man, Maigret, Compact, The Third Man, Crane, Detective, Sherlock Holmes, No Hiding Place, The Saint, Armchair Theatre, The Wednesday Play, Z-Cars, Adam Adamant Lives! and Softly, Softly.

He later appeared in genre films including Jason and the Argonauts (1963), The Gorgon (1964), Scars of Dracula (1970) and The Omen (1976), as well as the fantasy television series The Box of Delights (1984).

== Film ==
| Year | Title | Role | Notes | Ref. |
|---|---|---|---|---|
| 1948 | Escape | Jim the Shepherd | | |
| 1948 | Hamlet | Player King | | |
| 1948 | The Red Shoes | BBC Radio Announcer | voice, uncredited | |
| 1949 | Badger's Green | Jim Carter | | |
| 1949 | Cardboard Cavalier | Executed Man | uncredited | |
| 1950 | Chance of a Lifetime | William Kettle | | |
| 1950 | Treasure Island | Roach | | |
| 1950 | Waterfront | Sam | uncredited | |
| 1950 | The Woman with No Name | Colin | | |
| 1951 | The Franchise Affair | Bill Brough | | |
| 1951 | White Corridors | Sailor | | |
| 1954 | The Black Knight | King Mark | | |
| 1955 | Richard III | Tyrell | | |
| 1956 | 1984 | Man on Telescreen | uncredited | |
| 1957 | The Curse of Frankenstein | Mortuary attendant | uncredited (deleted scenes) | |
| 1958 | The Moonraker | Captain Wilcox | | |
| 1962 | The Phantom of the Opera | The Rat Catcher | | |
| 1963 | Jason and the Argonauts | Phineus | | |
| 1964 | The Gorgon | Inspector Kanof | | |
| 1964 | The Black Torment | Ostler – Regis | | |
| 1967 | The Viking Queen | Tristram | | |
| 1970 | Scars of Dracula | Klove | | |
| 1974 | Frankenstein and the Monster from Hell | Bodysnatcher | | |
| 1976 | The Omen | Father Brennan | | |
| 1977 | Sinbad and the Eye of the Tiger | Melanthius | | |
| 1978 | A Hitch in Time | Professor Wagstaff | | |

== Television ==
| Year | Title | Role | Notes |
|---|---|---|---|
| 1947 | Hamlet | Horatio | TV film |
| 1947 | Edward II | Baldock | TV film |
| 1948 | King Lear | Edmund | TV film |
| 1948 | R.U.R. | Radius, a robot | TV film |
| 1949 | Macbeth | Seyton | TV film |
| 1950 | The Whole World Over | Nicolai Nekin | TV film |
| 1950–1959 | BBC Sunday-Night Theatre | Various | 8 episodes |
| 1952 | Kidnapped | Alan Breck | 5 episodes |
| 1953 | Robin Hood | Robin Hood | 6 episodes |
| 1954 | Misalliance | Gunner | TV film |
| 1954 | Clementina | Charles Wogan | 6 episodes |
| 1955–1960 | The Adventures of Robin Hood | Various | 9 episodes |
| 1956 | Kidnapped | Alan Breck | 5 episodes |
| 1956 | The Count of Monte Cristo | The Ferret Branza Marcel | 3 episodes |
| 1956 | The Scarlet Pimpernel | Sir Andrew Ffoulkes | 15 episodes |
| 1956 | One Family | The Tarman | 2 episodes |
| 1956 | Nom-de-Plume | Korzeniowski | "The Man from the Sea" |
| 1956 | Theatre Royal | Tailor | Episode: "The Ends of Justice" |
| 1956 | The Buccaneers | Doorman at Doctor's House | Episode: "The Surgeon at San Rojo" (uncredited) |
| 1957 | Ordeal by Fire | La Hire | TV film |
| 1957 | Precious Bane | Gideon Sarn | 6 episodes |
| 1957 | Assignment Foreign Legion | Nadeau | Episode: "The Conquering Hero" |
| 1957–1958 | Sword of Freedom | Various | 4 episodes |
| 1957–1961 | ITV Television Playhouse | Various | 3 episodes |
| 1958 | The Adventures of William Tell | Hanzler | Episode: "The Golden Wheel" |
| 1958 | The Rebel Heiress | Roger Trevanion | TV film |
| 1958 | Queen's Champion | Don Alonzo | Episode: "The Edge of Defeat" |
| 1958 | Ivanhoe | Vignole | Episode: "The Kidnapping" |
| 1958 | The Dangerous Game | Philip Baker | Episode: "Pawns in the Game" |
| 1958 | The New Adventures of Charlie Chan | Pete Wilson | Episode: "Something Old, Something New" |
| 1958, 1966 | Armchair Theatre | Ragnar Brovik/Pete | 2 episodes |
| 1959 | Three Golden Nobles | Mad Peter | Episode: "The Painter" |
| 1959 | The History of Mr. Polly | Uncle Jim | 2 episodes |
| 1959 | H.G.Wells' Invisible Man | Vickers – Currie's Business Partner | Episode: "Strange Partners" |
| 1959 | Interpol Calling | Sukru | Episode: "The Thirteen Innocents" |
| 1959 | The Moonstone | Dark Stranger | 1 episode |
| 1959 | The Naked Lady | Bob Dyson | 2 episodes |
| 1959 | The Hill | Jesus | TV film (voice) |
| 1959 | The Scarf | Edward Collins | 3 episodes |
| 1959 | The Cabin in the Clearing | Simon Kenton | 4 episodes |
| 1959 | Dial 999 | Bill Mace Tramp George | 3 episodes |
| 1959 | The Flying Doctor | Ernie | Episode: "A Stranger in Distress" |
| 1959 | The Four Just Men | Inspector Nardi | Episode: "The Night of the Precious Stones" |
| 1959 | No Hiding Place | Blakey | Episode: "The Stalag Story" |
| 1960 | International Detective | Silversmith | Episode: "The Marino Case" |
| 1960 | Danger Man | "Bart" Bartello /Brenner | 2 episodes |
| 1960 | Paul of Tarsus | Saul Paul | 10 episodes |
| 1960 | The Four Just Men | Vito | Episode: "The Moment of Truth" |
| 1960 | The True Mystery of the Passion | Judas | TV film |
| 1960 | The Splendid Spur | Captain Luke Settle | 6 episodes |
| 1960 | The Terrible Choice | Lucifer | 2 episodes |
| 1960 | No Hiding Place | Percy Clarke | Episode: "Two Blind Mice" |
| 1960–1962 | BBC Sunday-Night Play | Various | 3 episodes |
| 1961 | Maigret | Gaston Meurant | Episode: "Raise Your Right Hand" |
| 1961 | International Detective | Bela Davos | Episode: "The Martos Case" |
| 1961 | No Hiding Place | Denger Wells | Episode: "Process of Elimination" |
| 1961–1966 | ITV Play of the Week | Various | 6 episodes |
| 1962 | The Sword in the Web | Tournay | Episode: "The Alibi" |
| 1962 | Harpers West One | Notril | 1 episode |
| 1962 | Man of the World | Thiboeuf | Episode: "Death of a Conference" |
| 1962 | Wuthering Heights | Hindley | TV film |
| 1962 | Compact | Eddie Eddie Goldsmith | Episode: "Musical Evening" Episode: "Efficiency Expert" |
| 1962 | Sir Francis Drake | Gazio | Episode: "The Bridge" |
| 1962 | Dr. Finlay's Casebook | Alex Dean | Episode: "Snap Diagnosis" |
| 1962–63 | The Old Curiosity Shop | Daniel Quilp | 11 episodes |
| 1963 | The Sentimental Agent | Sheikh | Episode: "The Scroll of Islam" |
| 1963 | Espionage | John MacBride | Episode: "He Rises on Sunday and We on Monday" |
| 1963 | No Cloak – No Dagger | Trev | |
| 1963 | Lorna Doone | Judge Jeffreys | Episode: "A Summons to London" |
| 1963, 1966 | The Saint | Police Inspector/Inspector Guido Gambetti | 2 episodes |
| 1964 | The Indian Tales of Rudyard Kipling | Mr. Bronckhurst | Episode: "The Bronckhurst Divorce Case11" |
| 1964 | Artists' Notebooks | William Hogarth | Episode: "William Hogarth (1697–1764)" |
| 1964 | HMS Paradise | Capt. Ahab Rudlow | Episode: "Thar's Gold in Them Thar Holes" |
| 1964 | Thorndyke | Frank Belfield | Episode: "The Old Lag" |
| 1964 | Smuggler's Bay | Ratsey | 5 episodes |
| 1964 | The Third Man | Luigi Carvossa | Episode: "A Question in Ice" |
| 1964 | Detective | Jasper Shrig | Episode: "The Loring Mystery" |
| 1964 | The Midnight Men | Skoder | Episode: "The Man from Miditz" |
| 1964 | Crane | Hugo Krantz | Episode: "Man Without a Past" |
| 1964–66 | Dr. Finlay's Casebook | Miller/Mr. Miller | 5 episodes |
| 1964–1975 | Z-Cars | Various | 4 episodes |
| 1965 | No Hiding Place | Old Starr | Episode: "The Street" |
| 1965 | A Tale of Two Cities | Dr. Manette | 10 episodes |
| 1965 | The Wednesday Play | Lord Fountain | Episode: "And Did Those Feet?" |
| 1965 | Sherlock Holmes | Mortimer Tregennis | Episode: "Episode: The Devil's Foot" |
| 1965 | ITV Play of the Week | Manservant Tomazo | Episode: "The Misunderstanding" Episode: "The Challenging" |
| 1965 | Thirty-Minute Theatre | Stuart Pendleton | Episode: "Give the Clown His Supper" |
| 1966 | Adam Adamant Lives! | General Mongerson | Episode: "D for Destruction" |
| 1966 | Softly Softly | Bellamy | Episode: "Best Out of Three" |
| 1966 | David Copperfield | Pawnbroker | Episode: "The Long Journey" |
| 1966 | This Man Craig | Alec MacGregor | Episode: "A Wise Father" |
| 1966 | The Liars | Pipe Smoker | 1 episode |
| 1966–69, 1972–73, 1983, 1985 | Doctor Who | Second Doctor | 128 episodes |
| 1967–68 | Doctor Who | Ramón Salamander | Serial: The Enemy of the World |
| 1970 | Little Women | Mr. March | 4 episodes |
| 1970 | Dr. Finlay's Casebook | Jack Baird | Episode: "Dust" |
| 1970 | ITV Playhouse | Mr. Fidler | Episode: "Don't Touch Him, He Might Resent It" |
| 1970 | Paul Temple | Colonel Harp | Episode: "Swan Song for Colonel Harp" |
| 1970 | The Six Wives of Henry VIII | Duke of Norfolk | 5 episodes |
| 1970–72 | A Family at War | Harry Porter | 9 episodes |
| 1971 | Softly, Softly: Task Force | Ernie Johnson | Episode: "Better Than Doing Porridge" |
| 1971 | The Persuaders! | Count Marceau | Episode: "The Old, the New, and the Deadly" |
| 1971 | ITV Sunday Night Theatre | Reilly | Episode: "Square One" |
| 1971 | Out of the Unknown | Jimmy Reed | Episode: "The Chopper" |
| 1971 | Thirty-Minute Theatre | Justley | Episode: "Jilly" |
| 1971 | On the House | Doctor Stanley | 2 episodes |
| 1971 | Doomwatch | Lyon McArthur / Alan McArthur | Episode: "In the Dark" |
| 1971 | Owen, M.D. | Charlie Lynch | 2 Episodes: "Where There's Smoke" |
| 1972 | Colditz | Padre | Episode: "The Traitor" |
| 1972 | The Protectors | Bela Karoleon | Episode: "Brother Hood" |
| 1972 | The Main Chance | Frederick Owen | Episode: "Acting for Self" |
| 1972 | The Befrienders | Jim Goody | Episode: "Fallen Star" |
| 1972 | Jason King | Bennett | Episode: "That Isn't Me, It's Somebody Else" |
| 1972 | The Goodies | Dr. Petal | Episode: "The Baddies" |
| 1973 | Hawkeye, the Pathfinder | Uncle Cap | 5 episodes |
| 1973 | Ego Hugo | Lahorie / Biard | TV film |
| 1973 | Owen, M.D. | Victor Darlington | Episode: "You Don't Get Me" |
| 1973 | Whoops Baghdad! | Tambalane the Tartar | Episode: "Ali and the Thieves" |
| 1973 | Jackanory | Storyteller | Episode: "The Three Toymakers" |
| 1974 | Charles Dickens' World of Christmas | ? | TV film |
| 1974 | Jennie: Lady Randolph Churchill | Benjamin Disraeli | Episodes: "Lady Randolph" & "Recovery" |
| 1974 | Coronation Street | George Barton | 4 episodes |
| 1974 | Sutherland's Law | Fergusson | Episode: "Who Cares" |
| 1974 | Village Hall | Bill Lester | Episode: "The Magic Sponge" |
| 1974 | Special Branch | Professor Frederick Denny | Episode: "Alien" |
| 1974–1975 | Crown Court | John Fisher/Joseph Molloy | 2 serials |
| 1975 | The Sweeney | Reg Crofts | Episode: "Hit and Run" |
| 1975 | Churchill's People | Hainault | Episode: "Silver Giant, Wooden Dwarf" |
| 1975 | Thriller | Lyall | Episode: "Nurse Will Make It Better" |
| 1976 | Lorna Doone | Counsellor Doone | 5 episodes |
| 1976 | Angels | George Moore | Episode: "Decision" |
| 1976 | Survivors | John Millen | Episodes: "Parasites" |
| 1976 | Our Mutual Friend | Rogue Riderhood | 1 episode |
| 1976–78 | The Feathered Serpent | Nasca | 12 episodes |
| 1976–1983 | Play for Today | Various | 4 episodes |
| 1977 | The Dick Emery Christmas Show: The Texas Connection | Potter | TV film |
| 1977 | Space: 1999 | Archon | Episode: "The Dorcons" |
| 1977 | Treasure Island | Israel Hands | 4 episodes |
| 1977 | BBC2 Play of the Week | Rear Admiral Markham | Episode: "The Sinking of HMS Victoria" |
| 1977 | Van der Valk | Father Bosch | Episode: "Accidental" |
| 1977 | Yanks Go Home | Lubbock | Episode: "The Game of the Name" |
| 1977 | Warship | Robertson | Episode: "Robertson Crusoe" |
| 1978 | Edward & Mrs. Simpson | Clement Attlee | 3 episodes |
| 1978 | The Devil's Crown | William Marshal | 5 episodes |
| 1978 | Horizon | Commentator | Episode: "Light of the 21st Century" |
| 1979 | Suez 1956 | Sir Walter Monckton | TV film |
| 1979 | The Onedin Line | Uncredited | Episode: "The Suitor" |
| 1979 | The Famous Five | Mr. Stick | Episode: "Five Run Away Together"" |
| 1980 | Only When I Laugh | Brian Perkins | Episode: "Where There's a Will" |
| 1980 | All Creatures Great and Small | Roddy | Episode: "Hair of the Dog" |
| 1981 | John Diamond | Joseph K'Nee | TV film |
| 1981 | Bognor | Xavier | 6 episodes |
| 1981 | Tales from the Thousand and One Nights | The Swindler | TV film |
| 1981–82 | Nanny | Mr. Jessop | 5 episodes |
| 1982 | Foxy Lady | J.P. Schofield | 2 episodes |
| 1982 | Shine on Harvey Moon | Wilf | Episode: "The Course of True Love" |
| 1982 | BBC2 Playhouse | William Pierce | Episode: "The Pigman's Protege" |
| 1982 | King's Royal | Father Campbell | 2 episodes |
| 1983 | Dramarama | The Instructor | Episode: "The Young Person's Guide to Getting Their Ball Back" |
| 1983 | Jury | James | Episode: "Ann" |
| 1983 | The Cleopatras | Sextus | Episode: "100 BC" |
| 1984 | The Two Ronnies | Mileaway Villager The Judge | 2 episodes |
| 1984 | The Box of Delights | Cole Hawlings | 3 episodes |
| 1984 | Swallows and Amazons Forever!: The Big Six | Harry Bangate | TV film |
| 1984 | Minder | Joe Mancini | Episode: "Windows" |
| 1984 | Amy | Lord Rothermere | TV film |
| 1985 | Summer Season | Gerald | Episode: "Long Term Memory" |
| 1986 | The Two of Us | Perce | 5 episodes |
| 1987 | Inspector Morse | George Jackson | Episode: "The Dead of Jericho" |
| 1987 | Yesterday's Dreams | Jack | 4 episodes |
| 1987 | Super Gran | Great Sporran of the Isles | Episode: "Supergran and the Heir Apparent" |
| 1987 | Knights of God | Arthur | 13 episodes, (final appearance) |

== Theatre ==
| Year | Title | Role | Notes |
|---|---|---|---|
| 1945–46 | Macbeth | | Bristol Old Vic |
| 1945–46 | The Seagull | | Bristol Old Vic |
| 1945–46 | Twelfth Night | | Bristol Old Vic |
| 1945–46 | Keep in a Cool Place | | Bristol Old Vic |
| 1945–46 | Jenny Villiers | | Bristol Old Vic |
| 1946 | Weep For the Cyclops | | Bristol Old Vic Company, and Old Vic & Sadlers Wells Trust Ltd |
| 1946 | Much Ado About Nothing | | Aldwych Theatre |
| 1950 | Eva Braun | Adolf Hitler | Gateway Theatre Club, London |
| 1950 | Hitler’s Mistress | Adolf Hitler | Grand Theatre, Brighton |
| 1963 | Night Conspirators | The Old Visitor | Wimbledon Theatre and Saville Theatre, London |

== Video games ==
| Year | Title | Role | Notes |
|---|---|---|---|
| 2015 | Lego Dimensions | Second Doctor | Archive audio |
