= Alec McCowen =

English actor (1925–2017)

Alec McCowen CBE
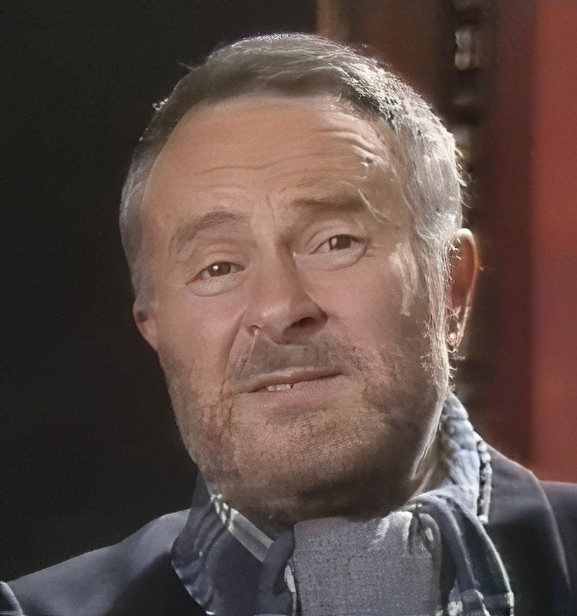
- Alec McCowen performing in The Green Tie on the Little Yellow Dog
- Born: Alexander Duncan McCowen; 26 May 1925; Tunbridge Wells, Kent, England
- Died: 6 February 2017 (aged 91); London, England
- Other name: Alex McCowen
- Education: Skinners' School
- Alma mater: Royal Academy of Dramatic Art
- Occupation: Actor
- Years active: 1942–2002
- Partner(s): Geoffrey Burridge (– 1987; his death)

Alexander Duncan McCowen, CBE (26 May 1925 – 6 February 2017) was an English actor. He was known for his work in numerous film and stage productions.

== Early life ==
McCowen was born in Tunbridge Wells, Kent, the son of Mary (née Walkden), a dancer, and Duncan McCowen, a shopkeeper. He attended The Skinners' School in Tunbridge Wells – he was known as "Squeaker" McCowen by his friends – and the Royal Academy of Dramatic Art.

== Career ==
=== Early theatre work ===
McCowen first appeared on stage at the Macclesfield repertory theatre in August 1942 as Micky in Paddy the Next Best Thing. He appeared in repertory in York and Birmingham 1943–45, and toured India and Burma in a production of Kenneth Horne's West End comedy Love in a Mist during 1945 with the Entertainments National Service Association (ENSA). He continued in repertory 1946–49, during which time he played a season at St John's, Newfoundland, Canada.

McCowen made his London debut on 20 April 1950, at the Arts Theatre as Maxim in Anton Chekhov's Ivanov, and made his first appearances on the New York City stage at the Ziegfeld Theatre on 19 December 1951, as an Egyptian Guard in Caesar and Cleopatra, and on 20 December 1951, as the Messenger in Antony and Cleopatra. Following a series of roles at the Arts and with the Repertory Players, he had rising success as Henri de Toulouse-Lautrec in Moulin Rouge at the then New Theatre, Bromley, and appeared as Barnaby Tucker in The Matchmaker at the Theatre Royal Haymarket, both 1954.

After appearances as Dr Bird in The Caine Mutiny Court Martial at the London Hippodrome in 1956, and Michael Claverton-Ferry in T. S. Eliot's The Elder Statesman, first at the Edinburgh Festival in 1958, then at the Cambridge Theatre, he joined the Old Vic Company for its 1959–60 season, among several parts taking the title role in Richard II, then stayed on for the 1960–61 season to play Mercutio in Romeo and Juliet, Oberon in A Midsummer Night's Dream and Malvolio in Twelfth Night.

McCowen joined the Royal Shakespeare Company in September 1962, appearing at Stratford-upon-Avon playing Antipholus of Syracuse in The Comedy of Errors and the Fool to Paul Scofield's King Lear, subsequently appearing in both plays at the Aldwych Theatre in December 1962 – performing these roles again for a British Council tour of the Soviet Union, Europe and the United States from February to June 1964. With the RSC he also played "the gruelling role" of Father Riccardo Fontana in Rolf Hochhuth's controversial play The Representative at the Aldwych in December 1963.

=== Later theatre work ===
McCowen enjoyed a career breakthrough at the Mermaid Theatre in April 1968 as Fr. William Rolfe in Hadrian the Seventh, winning his first Evening Standard Award as Best Actor for the London production and a Tony nomination after the transfer to Broadway.

At the Royal Court in August 1970, McCowen was cast to play the title role in Christopher Hampton's sophisticated comedy, The Philanthropist. If a philanthropist is literally someone who likes people, McCowen's Philip was a philologist with a compulsive urge not to hurt people's feelings – the inverse of Molière's The Misanthrope. Following enthusiastic reviews the production played to packed houses and transferred to the Mayfair Theatre where it ran for a further three years, making it the Royal Court's most successful straight play. McCowen and his co-star Jane Asher went with it to Broadway in March 1971 where he won the 1971 Drama Desk Award for Outstanding Performance.

McCowen's next big successes were in National Theatre Company productions at the Old Vic. In February 1973 he co-starred with Diana Rigg in Molière's The Misanthrope for which he won his second Evening Standard award; followed in July 1973 by the role of psychiatrist Martin Dysart ("played on a knife edge of professional skill and personal disgust by McCowen", according to Irving Wardle reviewing for The Times) in the world premiere of Peter Shaffer's Equus. McCowen took part in the first professional UK staging of Weill's Street Scene, at the Palace Theatre, London on 26 April 1987 (as Harry Easter), a charity performance in aid of London Lighthouse conducted by John Owen Edwards.

McCowen devised and directed his own solo performance of the complete text of the St. Mark's Gospel, for which he received international acclaim and another Tony nomination. It opened first at the Riverside Studios in January 1978 before beginning a long West End season at the Mermaid Theatre then at the Comedy Theatre. Taking the production to New York, he appeared at the Marymount Manhattan and Playhouse theatres.

Christopher Hampton's stage adaptation of George Steiner's novel The Portage to San Cristobal of A.H. at the Mermaid in 1982 gave McCowen a great final speech, an attempted vindication of racial extermination delivered by Adolf Hitler, which for Guardian critic Michael Billington was "one of the greatest pieces of acting I have ever seen: a shuffling, grizzled, hunched, baggy figure, yet suggesting the monomaniac power of the Nuremberg Rallies, inhabiting the frail vessel of this old man's body." It was a performance that also won him his third Evening Standard Best Actor award, a record equalled only by Laurence Olivier and Paul Scofield.

Two years later, again at the Mermaid, McCowen gave a portrayal of the British poet Rudyard Kipling in a one-man play by Brian Clark, performed in a setting that exactly matched Kipling's own study at Bateman's (his Jacobean rustic haven in Sussex) "and turning", as Michael Billington wrote, "an essentially private man into a performer." McCowen appeared in the play on Broadway and on television for Channel 4.

=== Directing ===
While preparing to co-star as Vladimir to John Alderton's Estragon in Michael Rudman's acclaimed production of Waiting for Godot at the National Theatre in November 1987, McCowen also spent a busy autumn staging Martin Crimp's trilogy of short plays Definitely the Bahamas at the Orange Tree Theatre in Richmond upon Thames, having previously enjoyed Crimp's style of writing in a BBC radio version of Three Attempted Acts. As Charles Spencer wrote in The Daily Telegraph: "As a director McCowen captures both the subtlety and the richness of these three original and beautifully written plays."

At the Hampstead Theatre in December 1972 he directed a revival of Terence Rattigan's wartime London comedy While the Sun Shines.

=== Film and television ===
McCowen made his film debut in The Cruel Sea released in 1953. His other film credits include roles in Town on Trial (1957), A Night to Remember (1958), The Loneliness of the Long Distance Runner (1962), The Witches (1966), Alfred Hitchcock's Frenzy (1972), Travels with My Aunt (1972, for which he received a Golden Globe nomination), the James Bond film Never Say Never Again (1983) in which he played the opinionated secret service quartermaster, "Q", named Algynon, Personal Services (1987) and Henry V (1989).

McCowen's television roles included the BBC's four-part adaptation of J. B. Priestley's Angel Pavement (1958), and his one-man stage performance of The Gospel According to Saint Mark, transferred to television by Thames for Easter 1979.

McCowen appeared alongside Maureen Lipman and Arthur Askey performing comic monologues in The Green Tie on the Little Yellow Dog, which was recorded 1982, and broadcast by Channel 4 in 1983.

McCowen appeared in the BBC Television Shakespeare series as Malvolio in Twelfth Night and as Chorus in Henry V. In 1984 and 1985 McCowen starred in the ten episodes of the short-lived television series Mr Palfrey of Westminster as a "spy catcher" working for British intelligence under the direction of a female boss (played by Caroline Blakiston).

McCowen's one-man performance as Rudyard Kipling was broadcast on television in 1984. His later appearances included playing Albert Speer and Rudolf Hess in the BBC docudramas The World Walk in 1984 and 1985, and as astronomer Sir Frank Dyson in Longitude in 2000. He was the subject of This Is Your Life in 1989, when he was surprised by Michael Aspel at the Strand Theatre in London. He was annoyed when no mention was made of his long-term male partner, fellow actor Geoffrey Burridge and threatened to stop the show from being broadcast. The dispute was resolved by the host, Michael Aspel, adding a voiceover over the final credits acknowledging the relationship.

McCowen was the narrator in a recording of Gerhard's cantata (after Camus) The Plague, with the Washington National Symphony Orchestra conducted by Antal Doráti in 1973, and also took the part of the Narrator in Stravinsky's Oedipus Rex, with Peter Pears, Kerstin Meyer and the London Philharmonic Orchestra conducted by Georg Solti; the music for this was recorded in March 1976, his spoken part later and the first issue was in February 1978.

=== Literature ===
McCowen published his first volume of autobiography, Young Gemini in 1979, followed a year later by Double Bill (Elm Tree Books).

== Personal life ==
McCowen's partner, the actor Geoffrey Burridge, died from AIDS complications in 1987.

== Death ==
McCowen died, aged 91, on 6 February 2017, and was cremated at Golders Green Crematorium.

== Filmography ==
- The Cruel Sea (1953) – Tonbridge
- The Divided Heart (1954) – Reporter
- The Deep Blue Sea (1955) – Ken Thompson
- Private's Progress (1956) – 2nd Medical Orderly (uncredited)
- The Long Arm (1956) – House Surgeon (credited as Alec McOwen)
- Town on Trial (1957) – Peter Crowley
- Time Without Pity (1957) – Alec Graham
- The Good Companions (1957) – Albert Oakroyd
- The One That Got Away (1957) – Duty Officer, Hucknall
- The Silent Enemy (1958) – Able Seaman Morgan
- A Night to Remember (1958) – Wireless Operator Harold Thomas Cottam – Carpathia
- The Doctor's Dilemma (1958) – Redpenny
- A Midsummer Night's Dream (1959) – Bottom (voice)
- The Loneliness of the Long Distance Runner (1962) – Brown
- In the Cool of the Day (1963) – Dickie Bayliss
- The Agony and the Ecstasy (1965) – (uncredited)
- The Witches (1966) – Alan Bax
- The Hawaiians (1970) – Micah Hale
- Frenzy (1972) – Chief Inspector Oxford
- Travels with My Aunt (1972) – Henry Pulling
- Stevie (1978) – Freddy
- Hanover Street (1979) – Major Trumbo
- Twelfth Night (1980) – Malvolio
- Forever Young (1983) – Father Vincent
- Never Say Never Again (1983) – 'Q' Algy
- The Young Visiters (1984) – J.M. Barrie
- The Assam Garden (1985) – Mr. Philpott
- Personal Services (1987) – Wing Commander Morten
- Cry Freedom (1987) – Acting High Commissioner
- The Importance of Being Earnest (1988) – Dr. Chasuble
- Henry V (1989) – Bishop of Ely
- The Age of Innocence (1993) – Sillerton Jackson
- Gangs of New York (2002) – Reverend Raleigh (final film role)

== List of theatre roles ==
- Sir Henry Harcourt-Reilly in The Cocktail Party, Phoenix Theatre, July 1986;
- Nikolai in Brian Friel's Turgenev adaptation Fathers and Sons, National Theatre, July 1987;
- Vladimir in Waiting for Godot, National Theatre, November 1987;
- Harry Rivers in Jeffrey Archer's Exclusive, Strand Theatre, September 1989,
- George in A Single Man, Greenwich Theatre, June 1990;
- Jack in Brian Friel's Dancing at Lughnasa, Abbey Theatre, Dublin and National Theatre, October 1990; Phoenix Theatre, March 1991; and Garrick Theatre, December 1991;
- Caesar in Bernard Shaw's Caesar and Cleopatra, Greenwich Theatre, February 1992,
- Michael in Someone Who'll Watch Over Me, Hampstead Theatre, July 1992; Vaudeville Theatre, September 1992; the Booth Theatre, New York, November 1992 to June 1993;
- Edward Elgar in David Pownall's Elgar's Rondo, RSC The Pit, May 1994;
- Prospero in The Tempest RSC Barbican Theatre, July 1994;
- Reginald Pager (a retired opera singer) in Ronald Harwood's Quartet, Yvonne Arnaud Theatre and Albery Theatre, September 1999 – January 2000.

== Honours ==
He was appointed Officer of the Order of the British Empire (OBE) in the 1972 New Year Honours and promoted to Commander of the Order of the British Empire (CBE) in the 1986 New Year Honours.

On 2 May 2017, McCowen was accorded a memorial service at St. Paul's Church in Covent Garden (known as "the actors' church"), conducted by the Reverend Simon Grigg. McCowen's nephew, Reverend Nigel Mumford, read an affectionate remembrance from McCowen's sister Jean Mumford's memoirs titled "Childhood memories of Pantos". The tribute was read by Dame Penelope Wilton, followed by a tribute from the playwright Christopher Hampton. Rebecca Trehearn sang "Bill" from Show Boat, which was followed by a tribute from the theatre critic Michael Billington and a tribute by the actor Malcolm Sinclair. After final prayers a plaque to McCowen was dedicated by Grigg to the left of the altar.

== Bibliography ==
- Theatre Record and its annual Indexes
- Who's Who in the Theatre, 17th edition, ed Ian Herbert, Gale (1981) ISBN 0-8103-0234-9.
- Double Bill (autobiography) by Alec McCowen, Elm Tree Books (1980) ISBN 0-241-10395-9.
- The National: The Theatre and its Work 1963–1997 by Simon Callow, Nick Hern Books/NT (1997) ISBN 1-85459-323-4.
- Halliwell's Who's Who in the Movies, 4th (and final) edition, ed John Walker, HarperCollins 2006 ISBN 978-0-00-716957-3
- Halliwell's Television Companion, 3rd edition, Grafton (1986) ISBN 0-246-12838-0.
- Memorial service notes added by Bryan Hewitt

== See also ==
- Tale Spinners for Children
