= Jenny Villiers =

1947 novel by J. B. Priestley

Jenny Villiers: A Story of the Theatre
- First edition
- Author: J. B. Priestley
- Illustrator: M. Elaine Hancock
- Language: English
- Genre: Ghost story
- Publisher: William Heinemann
- Publication date: 3 January 1947
- Publication place: United Kingdom
- Media type: Print (Hardcover)
- Pages: IV + 190pp
- OCLC: 8306303

Jenny Villiers: A Story of the Theatre is a short novel by J. B. Priestley, first published in 1947.

A successful but dispirited playwright is supervising the rehearsals of his new play, The Glass Door, at an old theatre in North England. The actors are irritated by his cynical attitude, but when left alone in the darkened green room he experiences visions of a 19th-century tragedy which alter his outlook on his profession.

In 1978 it was reprinted by Stein and Day, in a collection of works by Priestley entitled My Three Favorite Novels. The others were Angel Pavement and Bright Day.

== Main characters ==
=== 1946 ===
- Martin Cheveril, a 50-year-old playwright
- Pauline Fraser, a 45-year-old actress
- Mr Otley, the manager
- Ann Seward, an aspiring 23-year-old actress

=== 1846 ===
- Jenny Villiers, a 24-year-old actress
- Julian Napier, a young actor
- Walter Kettle, a stagehand

Priestley's play of the same title was performed by the Bristol Old Vic in 1946.

ol
