= The Other Place (collection) =

- First edition (UK)
- Author: J. B. Priestley
- Language: English
- Genre: Science fiction, fantasy
- Publisher: Heinemann (UK); Harper & Brothers (US)
- Publication date: 1953
- Publication place: United States
- Media type: Print (hardback)
- Pages: 265 pp

The Other Place, subtitled "And Other Stories of the Same Sort", is a collection of science fiction and fantasy stories by J. B. Priestley published in hardcover by Harper & Brothers and Heinemann in 1953. The title story, original to the collection, was adapted as an episode of the television series Westinghouse Studio One in 1958, starring Cedric Hardwicke as "a sorcerer with chin whiskers"

== Contents ==
- "The Other Place" (original)
- "The Grey Ones" (Lilliput 1953)
- "Uncle Phil on TV" (Lilliput 1953)
- "Guest of Honor" (original)
- "Look After the Strange Girl" (Collier's 1953)
- "The Statues" (original)
- "The Leadington Incident" (original)
- "Mr. Strenberry’s Tale" (The London Magazine 1930)
- "Night Sequence" (original)

"Mr. Strenberry’s Tale" was originally published as “Doomsday”.

== Reception ==
New York Times reviewer William Peden reviewed the collection favorably, describing it as "a series of very competent stories depicting the effect of the supernatural on the lives of ordinary English people . . . combin[ing] time-proven narrative methods and meaningful, if frequently obvious, social commentary." Reviewing for a genre audience, P. Schuyler Miller praised the science fiction stories for their "quality of thrown-away understatement" but found the other pieces marked by "the old familiar themes of fantasy, smoothly and competently but not very originally handled."
