= Remorse Code =

Studio album by Desperate Bicycles
- Released: 1979
- Label: Refill

Remorse Code is the sole studio album by English band Desperate Bicycles, released in 1979 by record label. It reached number 10 in the UK Independent Albums chart.

== Reception ==
Professional ratings
Review scores
Source	Rating
Smash Hits	negative
Trouser Press	favourable

Trouser Press called the album "an LP of ten pop gems", while Smash Hits called it "awful. And I do mean awful".

== Legacy ==
Steven Malkmus cited the album in his list "The Records That Changed My Life" for Spin magazine.
