= Sylvia Goaman =

British graphic designer (1924–2006)

Sylvia Nancy Goaman
- Born: 30 April 1924
- Died: 3 August 2006 (aged 82)
- Known for: Graphic design
- Parents: J. B. Priestley (father); Emily "Pat" Tempest (mother)

Sylvia Nancy Goaman (née Priestley; 30 April 1924 – 3 August 2006) was a British graphic designer, specialising in textile, postage stamp, and stained glass window design. In collaboration with her husband, Michael Goaman, she is known for designing a range of commemorative postage stamps: her husband was often given sole credit for what were mainly her design.
