= Mary Priestley =

British music therapist (1925–2015)

- Born: 4 March 1925; London, England
- Died: 11 June 2017 (aged 92); London, England
- Occupation: Music therapist
- Known for: Development of Analytic Music Therapy
- Notable work: Music Therapy in Action

Mary Priestley (4 March 1925 – 11 June 2017) was a British music therapist. She has been credited for development of analytical music therapy (AMT), one of five models recognized by the World Congress of Music Therapy in 1999. AMT draws on the psychoanalytic theories of Carl Jung, Sigmund Freud, and Melanie Klein to interpret unconscious processes through musical improvisation.

== Life ==
Born 4 March 1925 in England, she was the premarital child of English playwright and author, J. B. Priestley, and mother Jane Wyndham-Lewis. Her father was a vocalist skilled at playing by ear while her mother was a trained pianist. Priestley studied piano, violin, and composition in her youth. Her battle with bipolar disorder resulted in psychiatric hospitalizations throughout her life and may be said to have given her insights into psychoanalysis through the combination of verbal processing and nonverbal expression found in improvised music with a structured, purposeful framework. Her interest in music therapy was sparked upon hearing a lecture by music therapist Juliette Alvin.

In the early 1970s, Priestley met weekly with colleagues Marjorie Wardle and Peter Wright to experiment with therapeutic techniques using improvised music. They practiced the experimental techniques on one another, basing the work on their own emotional issues and on the issues of institutionalized adult psychiatric patients they were working with at St Bernard's Hospital, Hanwell. Their aim was to better understand and meet the therapeutic needs of patients by experiencing music therapy themselves. Their sessions led to the development of the improvisational approach to music psychotherapy called Analytical Music Therapy.

Priestley continued to refine and develop her approach. In 1975 she published Music Therapy in Action, subsequently lecturing and educating others in her method. Temple University (Philadelphia) has created an archive of Priestley's published writings, along with those of others on the topic of Analytical Music Therapy. Also included are her personal/clinical diaries and audiotapes of clinical work with approximately 75 clients, spanning the period of 1971 to 1990.

== Publications ==
- Music therapy in action. London: Constable, 1975; new ed. St. Louis, MO: MMB Music, 1985. ISBN 0-918-81232-1.
- The meaning of music. Nordic Journal of Music Therapy, 4(1). 1983/1995
- Essays on analytical music therapy. Gilsum, NH: Barcelona.5, 1994. ISBN 0-962-40802-6
- with Eschen, J. T. (2002). Analytical music therapy: Origin and development. In J. T. Eschen (Ed.), Analytical music therapy (pp. 11–16). London: Jessica Kingsley Publishers.

=== About ===
- Bunt, L. (2004). Mary Priestley interviewed by Leslie Bunt. Voices: A World Forum for Music Therapy, 4(2). doi:10.15845/voices.v4i2.180
