= Michael Goaman =

- Born: Geoffrey Michael Goaman; 14 February 1921; East Grinstead, West Sussex, England
- Died: 13 May 2009 (aged 88)
- Education: Hereford Cathedral School; Reading School; Reading University School of Art; Central School of Arts
- Occupations: Graphic designer; Illustrator
- Known for: Postage stamp design
- Spouse: Sylvia, née Priestley
- Children: 3

Geoffrey Michael Goaman (14 February 1921 – 13 May 2009) was a graphic designer and illustrator, who designed a number of British commemorative postage stamps starting with the 4d stamp in the set for the Coronation of Elizabeth II in 1953, and then many in the 1960s. He also designed record sleeves, logos and posters, and illustrated books. In the 1950s, he designed the logo of the European Conference of Postal and Telecommunications Administrations (CEPT), which later featured on one of his stamp designs.

== Personal life ==
Goaman was born on 14 February 1921 in East Grinstead, West Sussex, England. He was educated at attended Hereford Cathedral School and Reading School, and then served in the Royal Navy during World War II, captaining a destroyer in the Mediterranean and Atlantic theatres. After the war, he studied at Reading University's school of art, then at the Central School of Arts in London.

He met fellow designer Sylvia Priestley (1924–2006), daughter of the writer J. B. Priestley, at the Central School; they married in 1950. They had three daughters, and often worked together.

In retirement, Sylvia and Michael worked together to design a stained glass window, to commemorate the Millennium, for St Peter's Church, at Bramshaw.

He died on 13 May 2009.

== Stamps ==
Along with Faith Jacques, Goaman was critical of the Wilding design of monarch's head used on British postage stamps in the 1950s. Their complaint led in part to the Machin design which replaced it.

His own stamp designs include these for the United Kingdom's General Post Office:

- Coronation (3 June 1953; 4d)
- Centenary of Post Office Savings Bank (28 August 1961; Growth of Savings; 3d and Thrift Plant; 1s6d)
- European Postal and Telecommunications (CEPT) Conference (18 September 1961; C.E.P.T. Emblem; 2d)
- Freedom from Hunger Campaign (21 March 1963)
- National Nature Week (16 May 1963; Woodland Life; 4½d)
- Tenth International Botanical Congress, Edinburgh (5 August 1964; jointly with S. Goaman)
- Sir Francis Chichester's World Voyage (24 July 1967; with S. Goaman)
- First Flight of Concorde (3 March 1969; Concorde in Flight; 4d.)

He also designed stamps, often working with Sylvia, for forty or more other countries and territories, including Nigeria, Saint Vincent, Sierra Leone, the British Antarctic Territory, and Herm.

== Recognition ==
Michael and Sylvia's work was the subject of a 1968 Look at Life cinema documentary. An exhibition of their work was held at the Design Museum, London, in 1995.

Following his death, obituaries were published in The Guardian, The Telegraph and The Times.

A number of Goaman's original design drafts and preliminary sketches are held by The Postal Museum in London, and the Museum of New Zealand Te Papa Tongarewa.

== Publications ==
Goaman wrote magazine articles, including:

- "Special problems of designing British stamps". Linn's Stamp Weekly. January–June 1964.
