= English Journey =

1934 travelogue by J.B. Priestley

First edition (publ. Heinemann)

English Journey is an account by J. B. Priestley of his travels in England which was published in 1934.

Commissioned by publisher Victor Gollancz to write a study of contemporary England, Priestley recounts his travels around England in 1933. He shares his observations on the social problems he witnesses and appeals for democratic socialist change. English Journey was an influential work, inspiring George Orwell's The Road to Wigan Pier, and "has even been credited with winning the 1945 election for the Labour Party".

In the work, Priestley also expresses a prejudice against Irish immigrants in England: "A great many speeches have been made and books written on the subject of what England has done to Ireland... I should be interested to hear a speech and read a book or two on the subject of what Ireland has done to England... if we do have an Irish Republic as our neighbour, and it is found possible to return her exiled citizens, what a grand clearance there will be in all the western ports, from the Clyde to Cardiff, what a fine exit of ignorance and dirt and drunkenness and disease."

In a 1983 book of the same title, Beryl Bainbridge retraces Priestley's steps to capture the changes that half a century has brought to their shared native land.
