= Found, Lost, Found =

1976 novel

- First edition
- Author: J. B. Priestley
- Language: English
- Genre: Comedy
- Publisher: Heinemann
- Publication date: 1976
- Publication place: United Kingdom
- Media type: Print

Found, Lost, Found is a 1976 comedy novel by the British writer J.B. Priestley. It was Priestley's final novel, after a lengthy career.

== Synopsis ==
A civil servant floating through life encounters a beautiful writer and falls in love. She then announces she is going to the country and challenges him to find her to prove they are meant to be together.

== Bibliography ==
- Klein, Holger. J.B. Priestley's Fiction. Peter Lang, 2002.
