= Catherine Feller =

British actress and educator (born 1939)

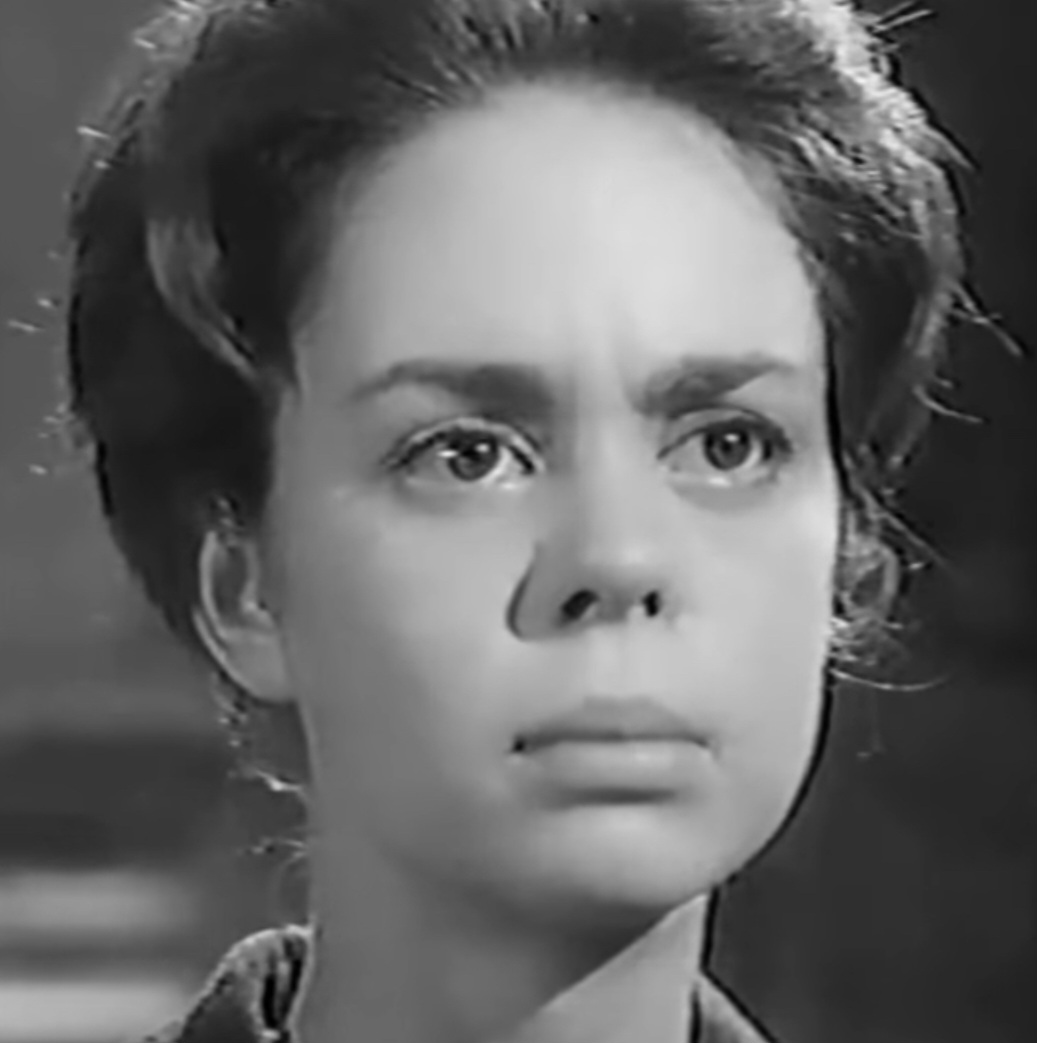
- Feller in an episode of One Step Beyond (1961)
- Born: 1939 (age 86–87); UK
- Occupations: Actress, educator
- Years active: 1954–2008
- Spouse: Claudio Giombi

Catherine Feller (born 1939) is a British actress and educator. She is perhaps best known for her role as Oliver Reed's love interest in the Hammer Film Productions' The Curse of the Werewolf (1961). She appeared in Waltz of the Toreadors (1962) with Peter Sellers, and in the first colour episode "The Queen's Ransom" of The Saint TV show.

== Career ==
In 1955, as a sixteen-year-old, Feller appeared in a production of The Lark at the Lyric, Hammersmith. The same year, she was featured in the Tatler modelling beachwear.

Feller has experience as an actress in several theatre performances, films and TV series in Italy and the United Kingdom, working for the BBC, the RAI and many other theatres and broadcasting companies. She has collaborated with several public and private schools as a lecturer on expressiveness and conversation courses addressed to teachers and students. She has performed her shows and laboratory activities sponsored by L’Astrolabio throughout Italian schools. Fluent in Italian, she also works as a translator for the magazine Vogue Gioiello, the Italian magazine for gems jewels, diamonds ornamental, and fashion trend.

== Filmography ==
Year	Title	Role	Notes
1954	The Belles of St Trinian's	Fourth Former	Uncredited
1957	Angel Pavement	Lena Golspie	TV series, 4 episodes
1958	The Gypsy and the Gentleman	Hattie	
1958	Bachelor of Hearts	Helene	
1959	Friends and Neighbours	Susan Grimshaw	
1960	The Malpas Mystery	Jinette	Edgar Wallace Mystery
1961	The Curse of the Werewolf	Cristina	
1961	Murder in Eden	Geneviève Beaujean	
1962	Waltz of the Toreadors	Rosemary, the young maid	
1965	San Ferry Ann	Lover Girl	
1966	Doctor in Clover	Catherine - Wife in French Movie	Uncredited
1968	The Girl with the Pistol	Rosina	Uncredited
1978	Lillie	Dominique	TV Mini-Series, 11 episodes
1981	The Little World of Don Camillo	Peppone's Wife	8 episodes
