= Bright Day =

1946 novel by J.B. Priestley

- First edition
- Author: J. B. Priestley
- Language: English
- Publisher: William Heinemann Ltd
- Publication date: 1946
- Publication place: United Kingdom
- Media type: Print (hardback)

Bright Day is a novel by J. B. Priestley, first published in 1946. One of his better-known works, it combines nostalgia for the northern England that existed before the First World War with an optimism inspired by the conclusion of the Second.

The book tells the story of a contemporary English screenwriter, Gregory Dawson, who goes to a seaside hotel in Cornwall to finish a screenplay. An accidental meeting with two people from his distant past prompts him to explore his memories of his youth in 'Bruddersford' (a fictional town conflating Bradford and Huddersfield) between October 1912 and June 1914.

== Plot ==
=== Chapters 1–6 ===
Gregory Dawson is an English screenwriter in his fifties, who fought in the First World War, and who has spent most of the Second World War in Britain after ten years in Hollywood. He has retreated in the spring of 1946 to the Cornish village of Tralorna to finish the screenplay for a film called The Lady Hits Back. An oldish couple staying at his hotel, the Royal Ocean, seem strangely familiar. They are identified to him as "Lord and Lady Harndean". In the hotel's restaurant Dawson is condescending to the musicians, who attempt to impress him by playing the slow movement of Schubert's B flat trio. The music triggers Dawson's memory, and he realises that the couple are Mr and Mrs Nixey, whom he has not seen since 1914. He approaches and introduces himself.

Back in his hotel room he recalls the Bruddersford of his youth, where he moved after the death of his parents to live with his maternal uncle. Lonely and missing his family, he finds himself charmed by a certain prosperous family he often sees on the tram and at concerts. He obtains a job at Hawes and Company, a wool firm, under the stentorian Joe Ackworth, and on the first day he is surprised to find that he recognises Ackworth's co-worker, Mr Alington, as the head of that happy family.

In December, Mr Alington's daughter Joan stops by at the office, looking for him. She talks to Greg and invites him to a concert at Gladstone Hall. After the concert he is delighted to find himself accepted without question as one of their social circle: the Alington children, Joan, Eva, Bridget, Oliver and David, and their friends Ben Kerry and Jock Barniston.

Ackworth quarrels with the cashier Croxton for sending samples away without his permission. Gregory enjoys Christmas 1912, which includes many visits, and a trip to the pantomime Cinderella; in May 1913, Greg accompanies the Alingtons to the village of Bulsden, on the edge of Broadstone Moor, for a picnic and a game of cricket. He meets the old painter Stanley Mervin. On arriving back home, the Schubert trio is played, but it is interrupted by the first arrival of the Nixeys.

(Dawson's reminiscing is interrupted by the arrival of Elizabeth Earl, the English actress who is to be the star of the movie he is writing. She is injured by his cool reception. On going downstairs to the bar, he talks to the publicist, Jake West, and the movie's European director, George Adony. Adony believes that she is romantically involved with Dawson, and he tries to persuade him she is not.)

In late summer 1913, Nixey takes Dawson out to the Market Grill and the Imperial Music Hall, and asks him about Ackworth and Croxton. Dawson goes on holiday to Silverdale with the Blackshaws, and meets their child Laura. In mid-September, he goes with Oliver and Bridget to a musical evening at the Leatons'. Nixey's monopolisation of a visiting customer, Albert Harfner, leads to a confrontation between him and Ackworth. Dawson guesses that Eleanor Nixey is having an affair with Ben Kerry, who is supposed to be "half-engaged" to Eva Alington. Dorothy Barniston tells Dawson's fortune. Joan demands that he tell her what is going on at the office that is upsetting her father; he quarrels with Ben Kerry at a showbiz party at the Crown.

=== Chapters 7–12 ===
(Dawson explains to Elizabeth Earl that he is feeling troubled by his past.) He recollects 31 December 1913, the last party at the Alington residence, when the family played charades. The arrival of the Nixeys shortly before midnight ruins the atmosphere, and the New Year has, he feels "an ill-omened beginning."

(The next morning, George Adony brings him breakfast in his room to talk about the script. He has lunch with Elizabeth Earl, who tells him that her agent Leo Blatt is coming this evening. After working for a few hours on the script, Dawson comes down and, during a conversation with Blatt, comes to the decision not to return to Hollywood.)

In the late spring of 1914, Ackworth quarrels with Croxton, and soon afterwards decides to leave the company. In June, the Alingtons go for a picnic at Pikeley Scar, a limestone cliff, in the company of Dawson, Jock Barniston, and the 10-year-old Laura Blackshaw. Jock Barniston is to deliver a letter to Eva from Ben Kerry, and is worried that it may herald a break-up. They meet the artist Stanley Mervin again, and Dawson is chatting with Bridget by a river when they hear a scream. Eva has fallen to her death from the cliff, an event witnessed by Laura. It is ruled to be an accident. The day after the funeral, Mr Alington collapses at work, and a fortnight later the Nixeys call at his house, where they are confronted by Bridget, who blames them for what has happened.

(Dawson again refuses Blatt's offer of work. Elizabeth Earl plans lunch at a certain seaside hotel, but by the time they arrive it is pouring with rain.) Dawson's last meeting with Joan is in early spring 1919, when they bump into each other at Victoria Station. He accompanies her to her flat and helps her carry her luggage up the stairs. She tells him that her mother has moved to Dorset, and Bridget has married an Irishman named Michael Connally. They go out to a revue, and then to a club, but on returning to the flat he makes the mistake of asking about Eva's death, and Joan becomes hysterical. (Elizabeth Earl's manner towards Dawson has cooled suddenly, because she has concluded that he is still besotted with Bridget Alington and not with her, as she had assumed. She tells him she has met David Alington—now Sir David and a famous physicist. Back at the Royal Ocean Hotel, Dawson talks to Malcolm Nixey, who is leaving the next day, and perplexes him by demanding to know what he has "got out of it all", that is, out of the "successful" life he has lived. Later, Eleanor Nixey dumbfounds Dawson by informing him that she was indeed in love with Ben Kerry.)

Having done with reminiscing, Dawson finishes the screenplay, and while chatting with the restaurant trio he hears them mention a fellow musician named Sheila Connally. When he arrives back in London, Elizabeth Earl organises a surprise meeting with Bridget Alington, whom he has not seen for decades. He learns that Joan is dead. Their talk is uninspiring and leaves them both disgruntled.

At a party at Claridges, Dawson encounters Lord Harndean again, who asks him to phone someone called Mrs Childs, who is involved with a film-making youth group. It turns out, to his amazement, that Mrs Childs is in fact Laura Blackshaw. They talk about Bruddersford, and she tells him that she saw Joan push Eva from the cliff. This is the last piece of the puzzle. He agrees to help the youth group, and the book ends with the implication that one part of his life is finally over and that another has begun.

== Characters ==
=== 1946 ===
- Gregory Dawson
- Brent, the film's producer
- George Adony, the European director
- Lord and Lady Harndean (= Malcolm and Eleanor Nixey)
- Horncastle (ch.1,5) and the Lincings, other guests at the hotel
- Zenek, Susan and Cynthia, musicians who play in the restaurant
- Elizabeth Earl, the English film-star
- Jake West, their publicist
- Melfoy, Mertz and Sam Gruman, more film people
- Terry Bleck, Elizabeth Earl's first husband, and Ethel Ferryman
- Leo Blatt, Elizabeth Earl's agent (ch.8,10)
- Sheila Connally, Bridget's daughter
- Mrs Childs
- Hinchcliff, leader of the youth group

=== 1912–14 ===
- Uncle Miles Lofthouse and Aunt Hilda
- Alice and Mrs Spellman, their servants (ch.2)
- Miss Singletons (ch.2) and Mrs Rankin, acquaintances
- Hawes and Company
  - Joe Ackworth
  - Bernard, Bertha, and Harold Ellis, other employees
  - Croxton, a bossy cashier
  - Old Sam Haley
  - Malcolm Nixey (nephew of Buckner) and Eleanor Nixey
- The Alington family
  - John Alington and Mrs Alington
  - Joan (dark), Eva (fair), Bridget (green eyes)
  - Oliver (Givenchy May 1915) and David
- Family friends
  - Ben Kerry (Somme 1916)
  - Jock Barniston (Somme 1916)
  - Dorothy Sawley, a cellist, and Miss Wilson
  - Fred Knott, a Socialist councillor, and Mrs Knott
  - The Peckels, Warkwoods, Dunsters, Blackshaws, Lucketts, and Puckrups
  - Mrs Ackworth, Herbert Leaton, a pianist, and Annie Leaton
  - Stanley Mervin, and his wife
- Albert Harfner and his father Julius, customers of Hawes & Co.
- Michael Connally, Bridget's husband

== Reception ==
W. J. Hurlow, writing for The Ottawa Citizen, felt that the book was a vast improvement on Priestley's wartime work, such as Three Men in New Suits and Daylight on Saturday. He felt that the book showed Priestley in the "full flower of his maturity" as an artist, concluding by calling it "Mr. Priestley's magnum opus". Similarly, David M. White, of the Richmond Times-Dispatch, thought that Bright Day was "a work of art that show[ed] Priestley at his best."

== Adaptation ==
The novel was adapted for radio as part of BBC Radio 4's Classic Serial series and broadcast in two parts on 30 May and 6 June 2010. The cast included David Hargreaves as Gregory Dawson/Narrator, Liza Sadovy as Elizabeth Earl, Dean Smith as Young Gregory, Sarah Smart as Joan Alington, Sarah Churm as Bridget Alington, Lowri Evans as Eva Alington, Conrad Nelson as Jock/Harfner, Fred Ridgeway as Malcolm Nixey, Janice McKenzie as Eleanor Nixey, David Fleeshman as Mr Alington, Fine Time Fontayne as Mr Ackworth, Seamus O'Neill as Brent/Stanley Mervin and Steve Marsh as Ben Kerry. The production was dramatised by Diana Griffiths and produced/directed by Pauline Harris.
