= Angel Pavement =

1930 novel by J. B. Priestley

- First edition
- Author: J. B. Priestley
- Cover artist: Pinder Davis
- Language: English
- Publisher: William Heinemann Ltd
- Publication date: August 1930
- Publication place: United Kingdom
- Media type: Print (hardcover)

Angel Pavement is a novel by J. B. Priestley, published in 1930 after the enormous success of The Good Companions (1929).

It is a social panorama of the city of London, seen largely through the eyes of the employees of the firm Twigg & Dersingham, at No. 8, Angel Pavement. Their lives are changed after the arrival of a mysterious Mr Golspie, who assures the future of their veneer-and-inlay company through imports from the Baltic. The story has as backdrop the high levels of unemployment and economic insecurity of late 1920s London, immediately before the Great Depression.

Dedicated to C. S. Evans, Priestley's editor at Heinemann, it was begun in October 1929 and completed in April 1930. It sold nearly as well as its predecessor.

== Characters ==
- James Golspie, and his daughter Lena, of 4a Carrington Villas, Maida Vale, W9
- The Dersinghams, of 34a Barkfield Gardens, SW5
  - Howard Bromport Dersingham, nephew of the original owner
  - Mrs Dersingham, his wife
- Friends of the Dersinghams
  - Mr and Mrs Pearson, retired from Singapore (ch. 3 and 11)
  - Miss Verever, a distant relation of Mrs Dersingham (ch. 3 and 11)
  - Major Trape and Mrs Trape, an estate agent and his wife (ch. 3)
  - Agnes, a servant of the Dersinghams (ch. 3)
  - The cook employed by the Dersinghams (ch. 3)
- The Smeeths, of 17 Chaucer Road, Stoke Newington, N16
  - Herbert Norman Smeeth, the cashier
  - Edie Smeeth, his wife
  - George (20) and Edna (17), their children
- Friends of the Smeeths
  - Fred Mitty, a cousin of Edie who lives in a Northern city
  - Mrs Mitty, and the daughter, Dot
  - Mr and Mrs Dalby, neighbours from no. 11 (ch. 6)
- Harold Turgis, the young clerk, of 9 Nathaniel Street
- Mr and Mrs Pelumpton, his landlords
- Park, a fellow lodger with socialist views (ch. 4)
- The foreign landlady at Carrington Villas (ch. 7 and 10)
- Stanley Poole, the office boy
- Gregory Thorpe, his replacement (ch. 11)
- Miss Matfield's circle
  - Lilian Matfield, the 29-year-old typist, who lives at the Burpenfield Club
  - Miss Tattersby, the Secretary at Burpenfield
  - Evelyn Ansdell, a friend of Miss Matfield (ch. 5)
  - Miss Morrison and Miss Cadnam, other friends who live at Burpenfield
  - Miss Kersey, a dreary Burpenfield resident
  - Mr Norman Birtley, a young man who goes on dates with Miss Matfield (ch. 5)
- Poppy Sellers, a new typist
- T. Benenden, a tobacconist in Angel Pavement
- Mrs Cross, the cleaner (ch. 1)
- Mr Goath, the salesman (ch. 1)

== Plot summary ==
The prologue depicts the arrival in London of Mr Golspie, who has come by steamship from an unnamed Baltic country. He discusses his immediate plans with the crew.

The first chapter contains a detailed description of a fictional street in the EC postcode area called Angel Pavement, and the employees at Twigg & Dersingham. Business has not been good, and Mr Dersingham is trying to decide whom to sack. Mr Golspie arrives with a dispatch case containing a sample book of veneers and inlays, and asks to see Mr Dersingham. After a short delay, he is admitted to Mr Dersingham's office, and there is a long discussion, after which both men leave mysteriously. Mr Smeeth is baffled, especially when Mr Dersingham rings up and tells him to sack their senior traveller, Mr Goath.

The second chapter introduces the tobacconist T. Benenden, and shows Mr Smeeth's family and home life. The next morning, Dersingham still has not returned to the office, and during lunch Mr Smeeth hears an unpleasant story about the failure of an umbrella firm called Claridge & Molton. He wonders if Mr Dersingham's absence indicates that they are all about to lose their jobs. But at five, Mr Dersingham returns and informs Mr Smeeth that the newcomer has offered a cheap supply of veneers from the Baltic, and their immediate future is assured. The next evening, Mr Golspie takes Mr Smeeth out for a drink at the White Horse, and tells him he ought to ask for a rise.

A new typist is employed, Poppy Sellers, and Mr Dersingham invites Mr Golspie to a black tie dinner party at his home. The party is not a success, firstly because of the incompetence of the servants and secondly because of the unexpected arrival of the daughter, Lena Golspie, who quarrels with Miss Verever and Mrs Dersingham.

The fourth chapter depicts one of the miserable weekends of the lonely young clerk, Mr Turgis, who wanders around London taking in any amusements he can afford. On the Monday after, he sees Lena Golspie for the first time, and is smitten. The fifth chapter depicts the narrow world of the typist, Miss Matfield, and her disastrous date with Norman Birtley, which is enlivened only by an accidental meeting with Mr Golspie, who gives her a box of chocolates on a whim. Later on Mr Golspie seems even more glamorous, when, shortly before leaving for a short trip, he asks her to take down letters on board the moored steamship Lemmala, and pours her some vodka.

Mr Smeeth obtains a rise in salary, and after talking to Benenden, he celebrates by going to a concert at Queen's Hall, where he enjoys Brahms's First Symphony. On returning home he finds out that his daughter Edna has been sacked, but he is not terribly dismayed; he admits to his wife that he has been given a rise, something which he had been planning to keep secret. On Saturday night his wife's cousin, Fred Mitty, and his family, arrive for a party, and Mr Smeeth quickly comes to loathe them after they wreck the parlour and damage some of his clothes.

Mr. Turgis has become obsessed with Lena Golspie, and jumps at a chance to see her again when he delivers some money from her father. She is bored, and takes him out to the cinema, flirting with him afterwards. They go on a second date, but she does not turn up to a third date, and he is devastated. Mr Golspie returns shortly before Christmas, goes away again on Christmas Eve, and returns again in time for New Year's Eve, on which he contrives to take Miss Matfield out for the evening. They begin to go on dates secretly.

Mr. Smeeth falls out with his wife, and is later disturbed by the departure of the office boy Stanley and a road accident involving the tobacconist Benenden. His son George seems to be employed by crooks, and Mr Golspie makes an arrangement with Mr Dersingham which strikes Smeeth as suspicious. He goes to visit Benenden at the hospital.

Mr Turgis is consumed with jealousy, and one Friday night he turns up unannounced at Lena's home and fights with her. Thinking he has strangled her, he wanders at random through London before arriving at Twigg & Dersingham, where Mr Golspie and Miss Matfield are "working late". He admits everything in despair, and they drive to Carrington Villas, but Lena is not there – she has run off. Mr Golspie sacks Mr Turgis. He returns to his rented room and considers suicide. The next morning, Poppy Sellers arrives to deliver his last pay packet, and they have a long talk which reconciles him to the idea of spending time with her.

In Chapter 11, Mr. Dersingham breaks the news to Mr Smeeth that Mr. Golspie has swindled them all and fled; the firm faces imminent bankruptcy. Mr. Dersingham returns home, obviously tipsy in front of their friends, and his wife is infuriated. But when she is fully informed of what has happened she feels a surge of energy. Mr. Smeeth returns home, and finding the Mittys there, throws them out, an action which restores his energy, as does unexpected sympathy from Mrs Smeeth.

The epilogue depicts the unabashed Golspies shipping out from London, on their way to South America: "A string of barges passed them...a gull dropped, wheeled, flashed, was gone...the gleam faded from the face of the river; a chill wind stirred; the distant banks...retreated; and even the smoky haze of London city slipped away from them..."

== Reception ==
George Orwell reviewed Angel Pavement in The Adelphi in 1930. Orwell, writing under his real name E. A. Blair, argued that Priestley's prose fails to "touch the level at which memorable fiction begins", lacking beauty, profundity and humour, and that "Mr Priestley's work is written altogether too easily, is not laboured upon as good fiction must be—not, in the good sense of the phrase, worked out." Dismissing comparisons between Priestley and Charles Dickens as absurd, Orwell suggested that rejecting such blandishments would make possible an appreciation of Angel Pavement as "an excellent holiday novel, genuinely gay and pleasant, which supplies a good bulk of reading matter for ten and sixpence." Responding to Orwell in The Guardian in 2012, D. J. Taylor reads the novel as a study of "detachment, the absolute conviction expressed by most of its characters that their lives would be better lived out elsewhere, doing other things and in the company of other people" and concluded that Angel Pavement "is a terrific example of the mainstream novel's occasional habit of noticing some of the features of ordinary life that so-called highbrow productions routinely ignore".

== Adaptations ==
In December 1957 the BBC produced a television adaptation of the novel, featuring the following cast:

- Maurice Denham – Mr. Smeeth
- Catherine Feller – Lena Golspie
- Thomas Gallagher – Captain
- Ursula Jenkins – Edna Smeeth
- Alec McCowen – Turgis
- Maureen Pryor – Mrs. Smeeth
- Robert Scroggins – Stanley Poole
- Anthony Sharp – Mr. Dersingham
- Sydney Tafler – Mr. Golspie
- Margaret Tyzack – Miss Matfield
- Robert Vahey – George Smeeth

Another television adaptation aired in Britain in 1967.

In May 2013, a two-episode dramatisation of the novel was aired on BBC Radio 4, directed and produced by Chris Wallis.
