= Robert Vahey =

British actor (1932–2013)

- Born: 1932
- Died: 29 October 2013 (aged 81); Brighton, East Sussex, England
- Occupation: Actor
- Spouse: Valerie Griffiths

Robert Vahey (1932 – 29 October 2013) was a British actor, known for his supporting roles in Samson and Delilah (1959), Z-Cars (1972), Secret Army (1978), Only Fools and Horses (1983 & 1986), Mapp and Lucia (1985), Wycliffe (1996), The League of Extraordinary Gentlemen (2003), and the Ricky Gervais comedy Derek (2013), amongst many others. He is, however, probably best remembered for his role as boat builder Bill Sayers, in 75 episodes of the 1980s television series Howards' Way.

He was married to actress Valerie Griffiths from 1964 until his death.

Robert Vahey died in 2013, aged 81, in Brighton, England.
