= J. B. Priestley =

English writer (1894–1984)

J. B. Priestley OM
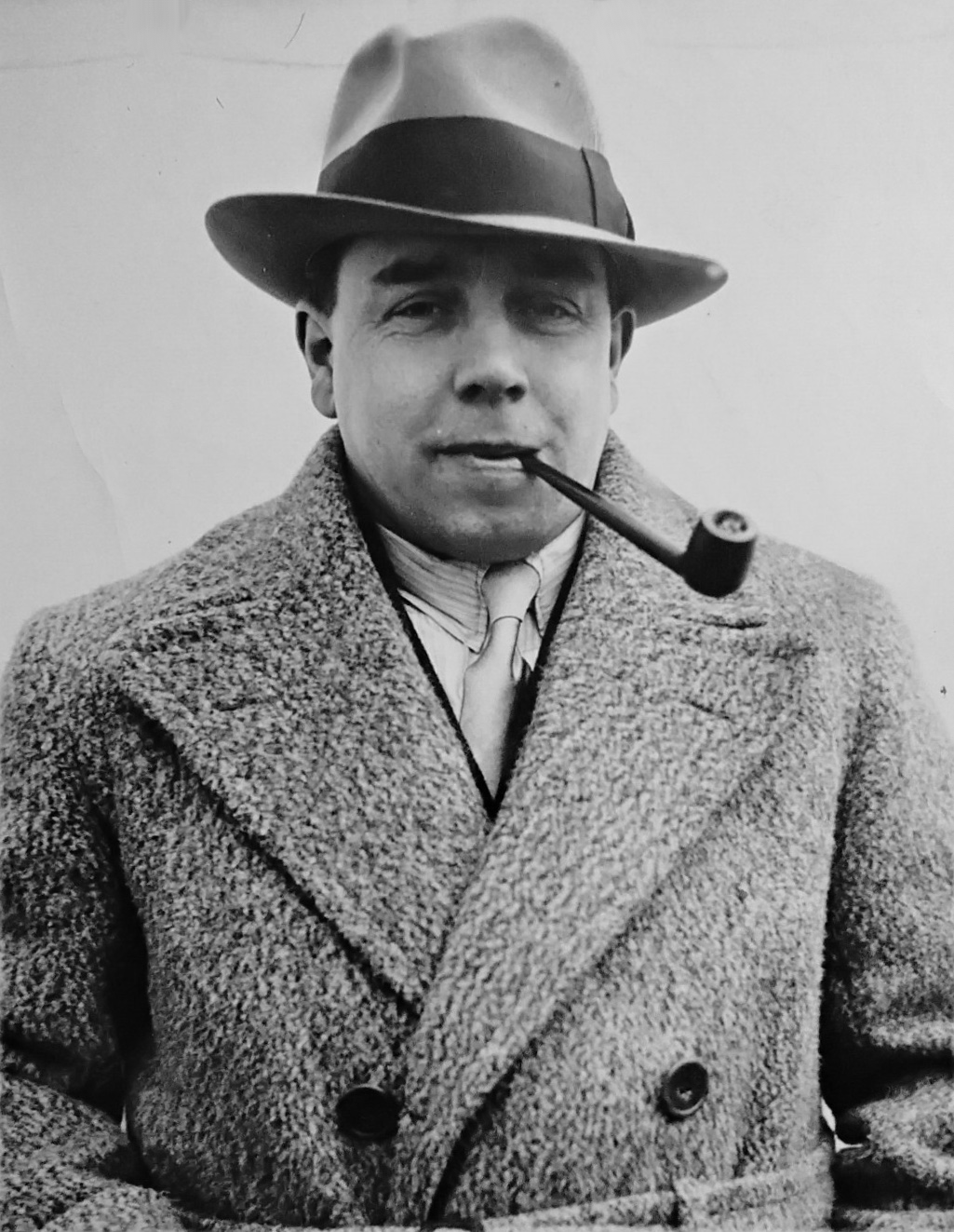
- Priestley in 1931
- Born: John Priestley; 13 September 1894; Manningham, West Riding of Yorkshire, England
- Died: 14 August 1984 (aged 89); Alveston, Warwickshire, England
- Education: Trinity Hall, Cambridge
- Occupations: Novelist; playwright; screenwriter; broadcaster; commentator
- Spouses: Pat Tempest (m. 1921; died 1925) Jane Wyndham-Lewis (m. 1925; div. 1953) Jacquetta Hawkes (m. 1953)
- Children: 5, including Sylvia, Mary and Tom
- Writing career
- Pen name: J.B. Priestley
- Period: 20th century
- Website: jbpriestley.co.uk

John Priestley(/ˈpriːstli/; 13 September 1894 – 14 August 1984) later John Boynton Priestley was an English novelist, playwright, screenwriter, broadcaster and social commentator.

His Yorkshire background is reflected in much of his fiction, notably in The Good Companions (1929), which first brought him to wide public notice. Many of his plays are structured around a time slip, and he went on to develop a new theory of time, with different dimensions that link past, present and future.

In 1940, he broadcast a series of short propaganda radio talks, which were credited with strengthening civilian morale during the Battle of Britain. In the following years his left-wing beliefs brought him into conflict with the government and influenced the development of the welfare state. He wrote a number of plays during this period, including An Inspector Calls (1945).

== Early life ==
Priestley was born on 13 September 1894 at 34 Mannheim Road, Manningham, which he described as an "extremely respectable" suburb of Bradford. His father, Jonathan Priestley (1868–1924), was a headmaster. His mother, Emma (née Holt; 1865–1896), was a mill girl. She died when Priestley was just two years old and his father remarried four years later. Priestley was educated at Belle Vue Grammar School, which he left at 16 to work as a junior clerk at Helm & Co. in the Swan Arcade.

During his years at Helm & Co. (1910–1914) he started writing at night and had articles published in local and London newspapers. He was to draw on memories of Bradford in many of the works he wrote after he had moved south, including his novel Bright Day and play When We Are Married. As an old man he deplored the destruction by developers of Victorian buildings in Bradford such as the Swan Arcade, where he had his first job.

== Military service ==
Priestley served in the British Army during the First World War, volunteering for the Duke of Wellington's Regiment in September 1914 and being posted to the 10th Battalion in France as a Lance-Corporal on 26 August 1915.

He was badly wounded in June 1916 when he was buried alive by a trench mortar. He spent many months in military hospitals and convalescent establishments. On 26 January 1918 he was commissioned as an officer in the Devonshire Regiment and posted back to France in the late summer. As he describes in his literary reminiscences, Margin Released, he suffered from the effects of poison gas and then supervised German prisoners of war before being demobilised in early 1919.

After his military service Priestley received a university education at Trinity Hall, Cambridge, where he was among the first cohort of students to study the newly-founded English Tripos; transferring to History for Part II, he was awarded an upper-second class degree in 1921. By the age of 30 he had established a reputation as an essayist and critic. His novel Benighted (1927) was adapted into the James Whale film The Old Dark House (1932); the novel was published under the film's name in the United States.

== Career ==
Priestley's first major success came with a novel, The Good Companions (1929), which earned him the James Tait Black Memorial Prize for fiction and made him a national figure. His next novel, Angel Pavement (1930), further established him as a successful novelist. However some critics were less than complimentary about his work and Priestley threatened legal action against Graham Greene for what he took to be a defamatory portrait of him in the novel Stamboul Train (1932).

In 1934, he published the travelogue English Journey, an account of what he saw and heard while travelling through the country in the depths of the Great Depression.

Priestley has been considered prejudiced against the Irish, as shown in English Journey: "A great many speeches have been made and books written on the subject of what England has done to Ireland... I should be interested to hear a speech and read a book or two on the subject of what Ireland has done to England... if we do have an Irish Republic as our neighbour, and it is found possible to return her exiled citizens, what a grand clearance there will be in all the western ports, from the Clyde to Cardiff, what a fine exit of ignorance and dirt and drunkenness and disease."

He moved into a new genre and became equally well known as a dramatist. Dangerous Corner (1932) was the first of many plays that would enthral West End theatre audiences. His best-known play is An Inspector Calls (1945). His plays are more varied in tone than the novels, several being influenced by J. W. Dunne's theory of time, which plays a part in the plots of Dangerous Corner (1932) and Time and the Conways.

In 1940, Priestley wrote an essay for Horizon magazine in which he criticised George Bernard Shaw for his support of Stalin: "Shaw presumes that his friend Stalin has everything under control. Well, Stalin may have made special arrangements to see that Shaw comes to no harm, but the rest of us in Western Europe do not feel quite so sure of our fate, especially those of us who do not share Shaw's curious admiration for dictators."

During the Second World War he was a regular broadcaster on the BBC. The Postscript, broadcast on Sunday night in 1940 and again in 1941, drew peak audiences of 16 million; only Churchill was more popular with listeners. Graham Greene wrote that Priestley "became in the months after Dunkirk a leader second only in importance to Mr Churchill. And he gave us what our other leaders have always failed to give us—an ideology." But his talks were cancelled. It was thought that this was the effect of complaints from Churchill that they were too left-wing; however in 2015 Priestley's son said in a talk on the latest book being published about his father's life that it was in fact Churchill's Cabinet that brought about the cancellation by supplying negative reports on the broadcasts to Churchill.

Priestley chaired the 1941 Committee and in 1942 he was a cofounder of the socialist Common Wealth Party. The political content of his broadcasts and his hopes of a new and different Britain after the war influenced the politics of the period and helped the Labour Party gain its landslide victory in the 1945 general election. Priestley himself, however, was distrustful of the state and dogma, though he did stand for the Cambridge University constituency in 1945.

Priestley's name was on Orwell's list, a list of people that George Orwell prepared in March 1949 for the Information Research Department (IRD), a propaganda unit set up at the Foreign Office by the Labour government. Orwell considered or suspected these people to have pro-communist leanings and therefore to be unsuitable to write for the IRD.

Priestley was a founding member of the Campaign for Nuclear Disarmament in 1958.

In 1960, Priestley published Literature and Western Man, a 500-page survey of Western literature in all its genres from the second half of the 15th century to the middle of the 20th century. (The last author discussed was Thomas Wolfe.)

In 1964 Priestley joined the Who Killed Kennedy? Committee set up by Bertrand Russell.

His interest in the problem of time led him to publish an extended essay in 1964 under the title of Man and Time. (Aldus published this as a companion to Carl Jung's Man and His Symbols.) In the book he explored in depth various theories and beliefs about time as well as his own research and unique conclusions, including an analysis of the phenomenon of precognitive dreaming, based in part on a broad sampling of experiences gathered from the British public, who responded enthusiastically to a televised appeal he made while being interviewed in 1963 on the BBC programme Monitor.

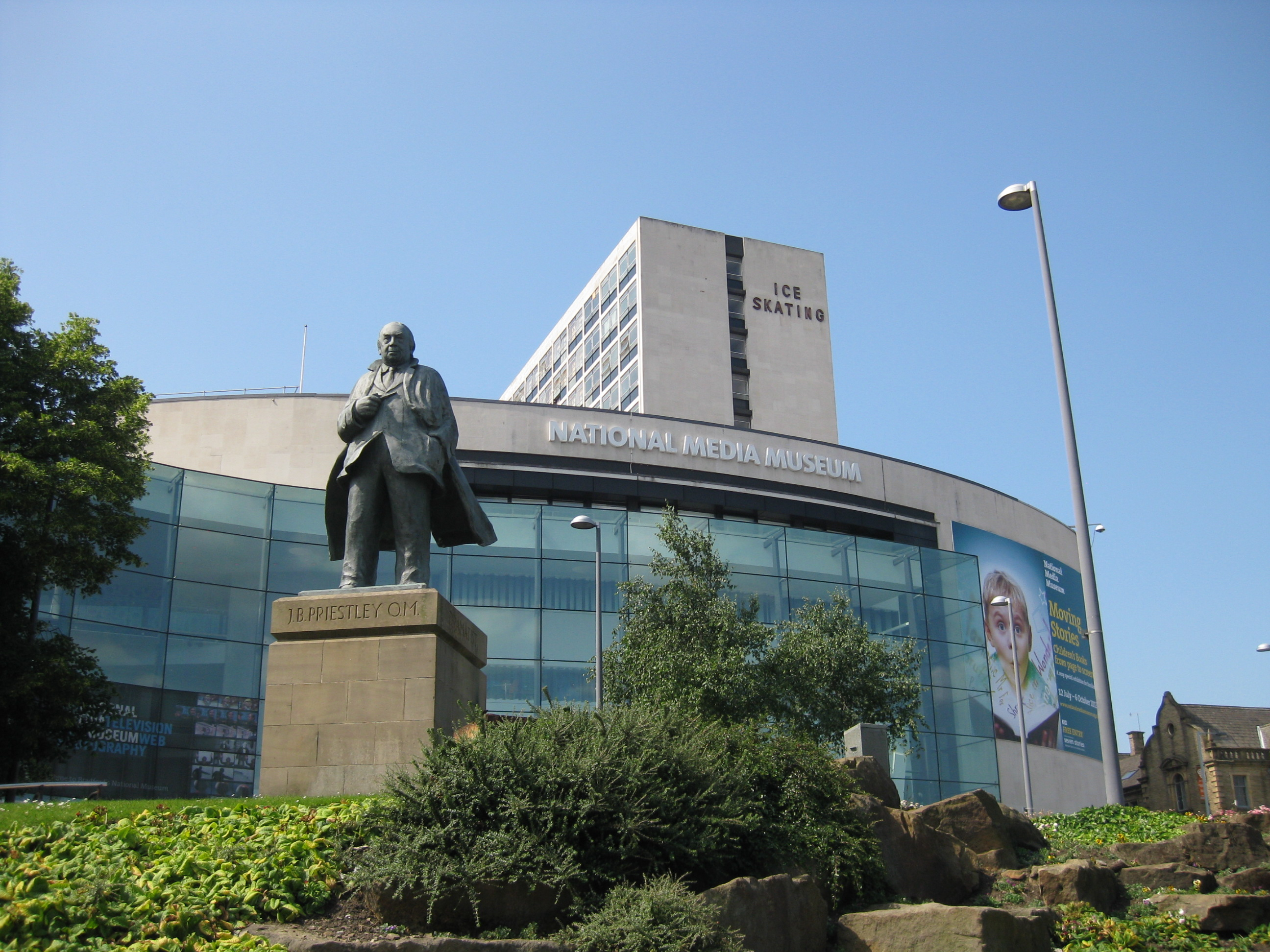
Statue outside the National Science and Media Museum in Bradford

The University of Bradford awarded Priestley the title of honorary Doctor of Letters in 1970 and he was awarded the Freedom of the City of Bradford in 1973. His connections with the city were also marked by the naming of the J. B. Priestley Library at the University of Bradford, which he officially opened in 1975, and by the larger-than-life statue of him, commissioned by the Bradford City Council after his death and which stands in front of the National Science and Media Museum.

== Personal life ==
Priestley had a deep love for classical music, especially chamber music. This love is reflected in a number of Priestley's works, notably his own favourite novel, Bright Day (Heinemann, 1946). His book Trumpets Over the Sea is subtitled "a rambling and egotistical account of the London Symphony Orchestra's engagement at Daytona Beach, Florida, in July–August 1967".

In 1941, he played an important part in organising and supporting a fund-raising campaign on behalf of the London Philharmonic Orchestra, which was struggling to establish itself as a self-governing body after the withdrawal of Sir Thomas Beecham. In 1949 the opera The Olympians by Arthur Bliss, to a libretto by Priestley, was premiered.

Priestley declined an offer to become a life peer in 1965 and declined appointment as a Companion of Honour in 1969. But he did become a member of the Order of Merit in 1977. He also served as a British delegate to UNESCO conferences.

=== Marriages ===
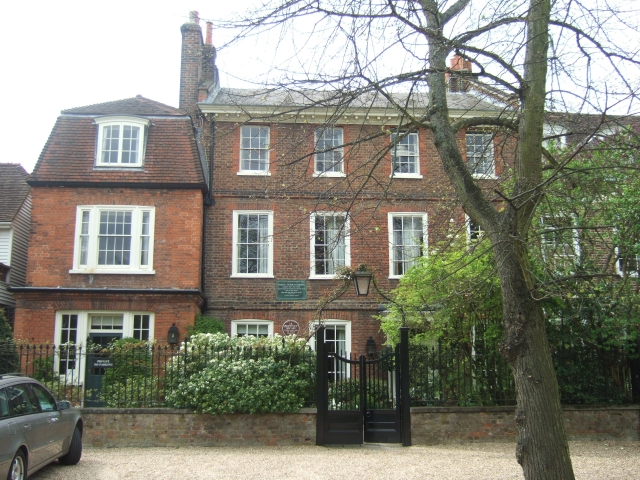
3, The Grove, Highgate

Priestley was married three times. He also had a number of affairs, including a serious relationship with the actress Peggy Ashcroft. Writing in 1972, Priestley described himself as "lusty" and as one who has "enjoyed the physical relations with the sexes [...] without the feelings of guilt which seems to disturb some of my distinguished colleagues".

In 1921, Priestley married Emily "Pat" Tempest, a music-loving Bradford librarian. Two daughters were born: Barbara (later known as the architect Barbara Wykeham) in 1923 and Sylvia (a designer known as Sylvia Goaman following her marriage to Michael Goaman) in 1924. In 1925, his wife died of cancer.

In September 1926, Priestley married Jane Wyndham-Lewis (ex-wife of the one-time 'Beachcomber' columnist D. B. Wyndham Lewis, no relation to the artist Wyndham Lewis); they had two daughters (including music therapist Mary Priestley, conceived in 1924 while Jane was still married to D. B. Wyndham-Lewis) and one son, the film editor Tom Priestley. During the Second World War Jane ran several residential nurseries for evacuated mothers and their children, many of whom had come from poor districts. For much of their married life they lived at 3, The Grove in Highgate, formerly the home of the poet Samuel Taylor Coleridge.

In 1953, Priestley was divorced by his second wife and then married the archaeologist and writer Jacquetta Hawkes, with whom he collaborated on the play Dragon's Mouth. The couple lived at Alveston, Warwickshire, near Stratford-upon-Avon, later in his life.

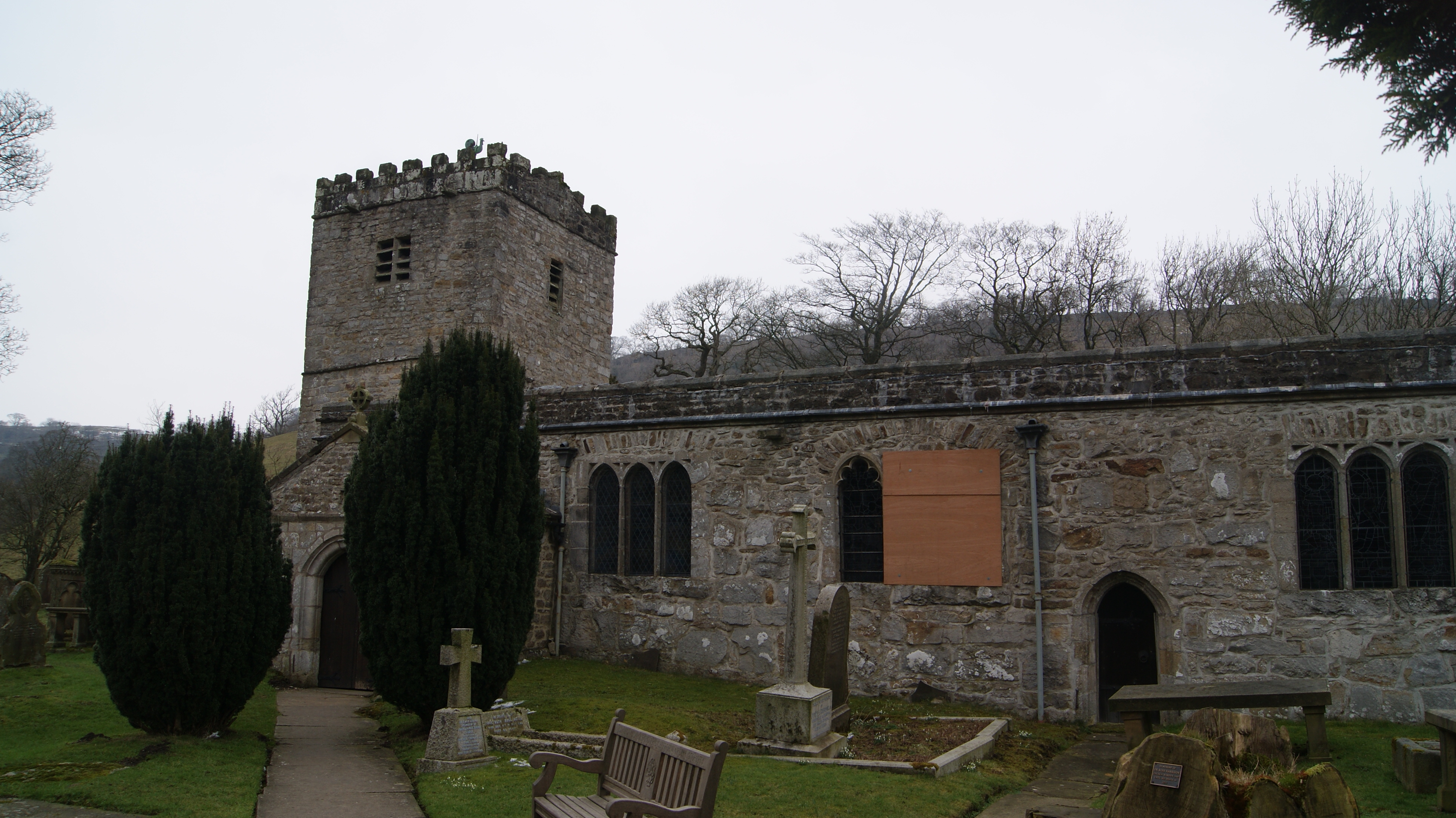
Priestley's ashes were buried in the churchyard of the Church of St Michael and All Angels in Hubberholme in the Yorkshire Dales National Park.

=== Death ===
Priestley died of pneumonia on 14 August 1984, a month short of his ninetieth birthday. His ashes were buried in the churchyard of the Church of St Michael and All Angels, Hubberholme at the head of Wharfedale in Yorkshire. The exact location of his ashes has never been made public and is known only to the three people who were present for the burial.

A plaque in the church just states that his ashes are buried 'nearby'. Three photographs exist showing the ashes being interred, taken by Dr Brian Hoyle Thompson. He and his wife were two of the three people present. The brass plate on the box containing the ashes reads J. B. Priestley and can be seen clearly in one of the pictures.

== Archives ==
Priestley began placing his papers at the Harry Ransom Center at the University of Texas at Austin in 1960, with additions being made throughout his lifetime. The center has continued to add to the collection through gifts and purchases when possible. The collection comprises 23 boxes as of 2016, including original manuscripts for many of his works and an extensive series of correspondence.

The University of Bradford Library holds the J. B. Priestley Archive as part of their Special Collections. The collection includes scripts, journal articles, lectures, press cuttings, correspondence, photographs and objects such as Priestley's iconic pipe. Most of the material in this collection was donated by the Priestley Estate.

== Bibliography ==
=== Novels ===
- Adam in Moonshine (1927)
- Benighted (1927) (filmed as The Old Dark House)
- The Good Companions (1929)
- Angel Pavement (1930)
- Faraway (1932)
- Wonder Hero (1933)
- Albert Goes Through (1933)
- They Walk in the City (1936)
- The Doomsday Men (1937)
- Let the People Sing (1939)
- Blackout in Gretley (1942)
- Daylight on Saturday (1943)
- Three Men in New Suits (1945)
- Bright Day (1946)
- Jenny Villiers (1947)
- Festival at Farbridge (1951)
- Low Notes on a High Level (1954)
- The Magicians (1954)
- Saturn over the Water (1961)
- The Thirty-First of June (1961)
- Salt Is Leaving (1961)
- The Shapes of Sleep (1962)
- Sir Michael and Sir George (1964)
- Lost Empires (1965)
- It's an Old Country (1967)
- The Image Men Vol. 1: Out of Town (1968)
- The Image Men Vol. 2: London End (1968)
- Found, Lost, Found (1976)

=== Other fiction ===
- Brief Diversions: Being Tales, Travesties and Epigrams (1922)
- Farthing Hall (1929) (novel written in collaboration with Hugh Walpole)
- The Town Major of Miraucourt (1930) (short story published in a limited edition of 525 copies)
- I'll Tell You Everything (1932) (novel written in collaboration with Gerald Bullett)
- The Other Place (1953) (short stories)
- Snoggle (1971) (novel for children)
- The Carfitt Crisis (1975) (two novellas and a short story)
- Novelizations by Ruth Mitchell (author of the wartime novel The Lost Generation and Priestley's sister-in-law by way of his second marriage):
  - Dangerous Corner (1933), based on the later Broadway draft of the play, with a foreword by Priestley (paperback)
  - Laburnum Grove (1936), based on the play and subsequent screenplay, published as a hardcover tie-in edition to the film

=== Selected plays ===
- The Good Companions (1931)
- Dangerous Corner (1932)
- Laburnum Grove (1933)
- Eden End (1934)
- Cornelius (1935)
- People at Sea (1936)
- Bees on the Boat Deck (1936)
- Time and the Conways (1937)
- I Have Been Here Before (1937)
- When We Are Married (1938)
- Mystery at Greenfingers (1938)
- Johnson Over Jordan (1939)
- The Long Mirror (1940)
- They Came to a City (1943)
- Desert Highway (1944)
- How Are They at Home? (1944)
- The Golden Fleece (1944)
- An Inspector Calls (1945)
- Ever Since Paradise (1946)
- The Linden Tree (1947)
- The Rose and Crown (1947)
- Home Is Tomorrow (1948)
- Summer Day's Dream (1949)
- Mother's Day (1950)
- Treasure on Pelican (1952)
- The White Countess (1954)
- Mr. Kettle and Mrs. Moon (1955)
- The Glass Cage (1957)
- The Pavilion of Masks (1963)
- The Thirty-first of June: A Tale of True Love, Enterprise and Progress in the Arthurian and AD-Atomic Ages
  - Novel. December 1961: hardback; ISBN 0-434-60326-0 / ISBN 978-0-434-60326-8 (UK edition); William Heinemann Ltd
  - BBC radio dramatisation; one and a half hours
  - Novel. 1996: paperback; ISBN 0-7493-2281-0 / ISBN 978-0-7493-2281-6 (UK edition); Mandarin
  - 31 June (1978) (TV) Soviet film
- Benighted (2016, adapted from his 1928 novel by Duncan Gates)
- The Roundabout (1931)

=== Films ===
- Sing As We Go (1934) (screenplay with Gordon Wellesley)
- Look Up and Laugh (1935) (screenplay)
- We Live in Two Worlds (1937) (a documentary short subject, written and presented by Priestley)
- Jamaica Inn (1939) (additional dialogue)
- Britain at Bay (1940) (a documentary short subject, written and presented by Priestley)
- They Came to a City (1944) (screenplay with Basil Dearden and Sidney Cole, based on his play; Priestley also appears as the story's narrator)
- Last Holiday (1950) (screenplay and producer)

=== Television work ===
- You Know What People Are (1955)
- Armchair Theatre: Now Let Him Go (ABC – 15 September 1957)
- Doomsday for Dyson (Granada – 10 March 1958)
- Out of the Unknown: Level Seven (BBC2 – 27 October 1966, adaptation of a story by Mordecai Roshwald)
- The Wednesday Play: Anyone for Tennis? (BBC1 – 25 September 1968)
- Shadows: The Other Window (Thames – 15 October 1975, co-written with Jacquetta Hawkes)
- An Inspector Calls (several versions including BBC – 2015)

=== Literary criticism ===
- The English Comic Characters (1925)
- The English Novel (1927)
- English humour (1929, revised 1976)
- Literature and Western Man (1960)
- Charles Dickens and his world (1969)

=== Social and political works ===
- English Journey (1934)
- Out of the people (1941)
- British Women Go to War (1943)
- The Secret Dream: an essay on Britain, America and Russia (1946)
- The Arts under Socialism (1947)
- The Prince of Pleasure and his Regency (1969)
- The Edwardians (1970)
- Victoria's Heyday (1972)
- The English (1973)
- A Visit to New Zealand (1974)

=== Autobiography and essays ===
- Essays of To-day and Yesterday (1926)
- Apes and Angels (1928)
- The Balconinny (1931)
- Midnight on the Desert (1937)
- Rain Upon Godshill: A Further Chapter of Autobiography (1939)
- Postscripts (1940)
- Delight (1949)
- Journey Down a Rainbow (co-authored with Jacquetta Hawkes, 1955)
- Thoughts in the wilderness (1957)
- Margin Released (1962)
- Man and Time (1964)
- The Moments and Other Pieces (1966)
- Over the Long High Wall (1972)
- The Happy Dream (limited edition, 1976)
- Instead of the Trees (1977)

Political offices
Preceded by New post	Chairman of the Common Wealth Party; 1942	Succeeded by Richard Acland
