= Farjeon =

Farjeon is a surname that may refer to:

- Annabel Farjeon (1919–2004), British ballerina and author
- Benjamin Farjeon (1838–1903), British novelist, playwright, printer and journalist
- Eleanor Farjeon (1881–1965), English author of children's stories and plays, poetry, biography, history and satire
- Gervase Farjeon (1920–2001), English theatre producer, director, manager and designer
- Harry Farjeon (1878–1948), British composer
- Herbert Farjeon (1887–1945), English theatre critic, lyricist, librettist, playwright, theatre manager and researcher
- Joan Jefferson Farjeon (1913–2006), English scenographer and scenic designer
- Joseph Jefferson Farjeon (1883–1955), English crime and mystery novelist, playwright and screenwriter
- Violetta Farjeon (1923–2015), actress

== See also ==
Farjeon family
