= Gervase Farjeon =

English theatre producer, director, manager and designer

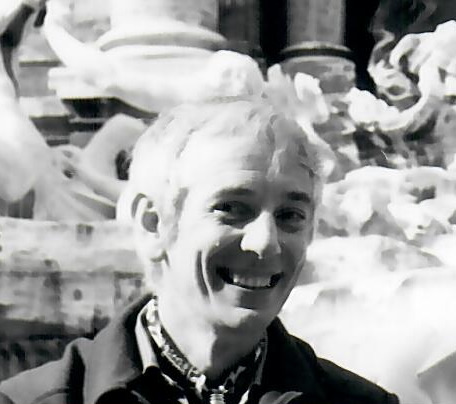
- Farjeon at the Trevi Fountain, Rome, 1971
- Born: 23 October 1920; Bucklebury, Berkshire, England
- Died: 6 August 2001 (aged 80); London, England
- Education: Bedales School
- Occupations: Theatre producer, director, manager and designer
- Spouse: Violetta à Beckett Williams
- Partner: Anne Harvey
- Parents: Herbert Farjeon (father); Joan Thornycroft (mother)
- Relatives: Benjamin Farjeon (grandfather); Hamo Thornycroft (grandfather); Harry Farjeon (uncle); Joseph Jefferson Farjeon (uncle); Eleanor Farjeon (aunt); Annabel Farjeon (sister)

Gervase Laurence Farjeon (23 October 1920 - 6 August 2001) was an English theatre producer, director, manager and designer. Born into a theatrical and artistic family he became director of productions at the Players' Theatre in London and co-commissioned and produced The Boy Friend, a British musical of the 1950s. He nursed it through its record-breaking five-year run in London's West End and in the 1960s produced further shows in London and elsewhere in the United Kingdom. Later he was in demand as a producer and set designer for pioneering companies who used theatrical techniques for corporate conferences, product launches, and cabarets. An animal lover, in later life he worked voluntarily with the Born Free Foundation inspecting zoos around Europe for the European Community. From 1965 he was the literary executor of his aunt, the English author and poet Eleanor Farjeon and allowed her hymn Morning Has Broken to be recorded by the pop singer Cat Stevens. It became an international hit.

== Early life ==
Farjeon was born in Bucklebury, Berkshire, England on 23 October 1920. He was the third child and only son of Herbert Farjeon (1887-1945), a presenter of revues, lyricist, playwright and theatre manager, whose father had been a novelist and playwright and a friend of Charles Dickens and whose mother was descended from the Jefferson acting dynasty of the United States.

Farjeon's mother was Joan Farjeon (1888–1989), née Thornycroft, the daughter of the sculptor Sir Hamo Thornycroft RA. She was a first cousin of the poet Siegfried Sassoon.

Farjeon's wider family was almost exclusively artistic: an uncle, Harry Farjeon, was a composer, another uncle, Joseph Jefferson Farjeon, was a novelist and playwright, and his aunt, Eleanor Farjeon, was an author of children's stories and plays, poetry, biography, history and satire.

Farjeon grew up surrounded by musicians, actors, artists and writers and listened to stories and gossip about many of the artistic figures of the late 19th and early 20th centuries. He was entranced by the theatre. His father often took him to first nights and encouraged him from an early age to criticise shows and their performances and staging. Farjeon longed to be an actor. Outside the artistic milieu of his family, in early childhood he also developed a love of animals.

After unhappy experiences at an English preparatory school, he was educated at the small and progressively liberal Bedales School at Petersfield in Hampshire, England where he was put in charge of the school's theatre. From Bedales, even though he still harboured ambitions to be an actor and had an intensifying interest in the theatre, he started training as an architect at the Architectural Association School of Architecture in Bedford Square, London.

The outbreak of World War II in 1939 brought Farjeon's studies to an abrupt end. Like his father, he had been a pacifist from childhood, and when called up under the National Service (Armed Forces) Act 1939 he declared himself to be a conscientious objector. Expecting a prison sentence, he faced a tribunal chaired by a judge, but being able to prove a lifelong pacifism he was granted exemption and began work on the home front with evacuees.

Farjeon's father, being the son of a Jew and a prominent figure in Britain, was at risk of detention and possible deportation should Nazi forces invade the United Kingdom. When invasion seemed likely in June 1940 his father sought reassurance from his cousin Harry, who lived in the United States, that the family, including his children, would be able to find safety with him in New York. In the event, the Farjeons did not need to leave Britain.

Released from his architectural studies and exempted from service, Farjeon was able to pursue his passion for the theatre, starting as a stage manager, and playing small parts in the many shows touring wartime Britain. Several productions in which he appeared were produced under the auspices of the Council for the Encouragement of Music and the Arts, the forerunner of the Arts Council of Great Britain, where Farjeon was noticed by Sybil Thorndike and Lewis Casson and invited to work for the Council in the theatrical field as part of its duties to promote and maintain British culture.

== The Players' Theatre and The Boy Friend ==
In 1946, Farjeon was invited by Leonard Sachs, its director, to become stage director at the Players' Theatre in London's West End. In this role he took over the control of the nightly Victorian-type music hall productions staged by the company, with the programme changing every two weeks. Under his direction were many performers who in the post-war years were to achieve fame. Among them were Ian Carmichael, Maria Charles, Clive Dunn, Patricia Hayes, Robin Hunter, Hattie Jacques, James Robertson Justice, John Le Mesurier, Bernard Miles, Maggie Smith, Eleanor Summerfield, and Peter Ustinov.

Sachs left the Players' in 1947 and Farjeon, now Director of Productions, was joined by the stage designer Reginald Woolley and his partner, actor-producer Don Gemmell, to form the new board of directors. By the early 1950s the Players' Theatre Club had over 3000 members and had achieved "world-wide fame".

In 1952 Farjeon and his colleagues decided to commission their own musical to take the stage at the Players' as a filler for part of the variety programme and it was Farjeon who telephoned an actor and writer of revues, Sandy Wilson, to invite him to discuss writing a musical.

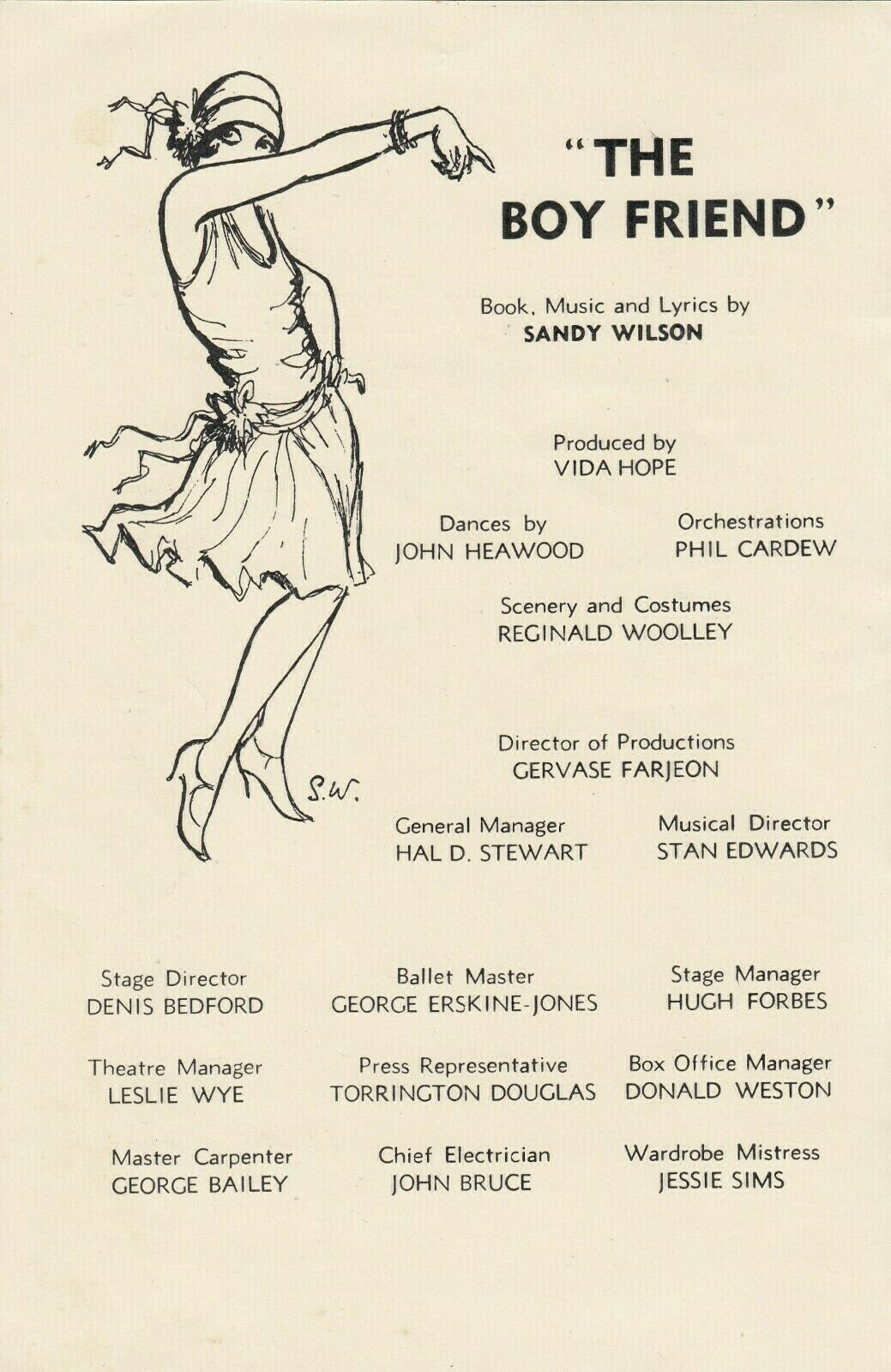
Page from the theatre programme of the 1000th production of The Boy Friend, 22 June 1956

In his autobiography, I Could Be Happy, Wilson recalls that at the first meeting with Farjeon and Woolley, when he suggested doing a musical in the period of the 1920s, Farjeon quickly replied: "That would be fine". Wilson was commissioned to write a one-hour show, called The Boy Friend, to be staged in a three-week run at the Players'. It opened to good reviews in the spring of 1953. In the autumn of that year it was lengthened and opened for a season at the Embassy Theatre in Swiss Cottage, London. Following that success, as Director of Productions Farjeon was instrumental through family theatrical connections in opening The Boy Friend at Wyndham's Theatre in the West End on 14 January 1954.

With Farjeon remaining at the production helm it ran for a then record-breaking five years and 2,048 performances, taking £650,000 at the box office and playing to 1,250,000 people.

With the money-spinning success of The Boy Friend, Farjeon and his fellow directors of the Players' Theatre nursed ambitions to produce more shows that might succeed in the West End. They set up a production company, Players' Ventures Limited, with Farjeon as Managing Director. Their first attempt, Twenty Minutes South, a musical by Maurice Browning and Peter Greenwell, opened at the Players' Theatre in May 1955 and after restaging in Birmingham and a week in Nottingham it opened at St Martin's Theatre in the West End in July 1955 and ran for 101 performances, closing in October 1955.

A considerably less successful venture followed: an "implausible Oxonian farce", Commemoration Ball by Stanley Parker. After a try-out in Worthing in September 1955 it opened at the Piccadilly Theatre in the West End in April 1956 where it ran for only six performances, the gallery booing the opening night.

After a couple of years Farjeon and his fellow directors staged another musical. This was The Crooked Mile by Peter Greenwell and Peter Wildeblood. After two weeks in Manchester and two in Liverpool, it opened at the Cambridge Theatre in the West End in September 1959. This show was welcomed enthusiastically by the first night audience and brought stardom for the performer Millicent Martin but it ran for only 164 performances and closed in January 1960, having lost £15,000.

Another musical, Johnny the Priest by Antony Hopkins and Peter Powell was in production at this point (it was destined to run in the West End for only eleven performances and lost the Players' Theatre £25,000) but Farjeon, by now setting up as a producer, had decided to break away from the Players' Theatre and Players' Ventures, resigning his directorships in March 1960.

== Producer ==
While at Wyndham's with The Boy Friend Farjeon had met Richard O'Donoghue, a former actor working as Wyndham's manager, and together in 1959, they set up a theatrical production partnership. They produced a number of shows during the following six years.

The first was The Doctor and the Devils, an adaptation of a screenplay by the Welsh poet and writer Dylan Thomas. It was based on the true story of William Burke and William Hare, who in 1828 in Edinburgh, Scotland, murdered at least 16 people and sold their bodies for anatomical dissection. After being first seen in Glasgow in 1961 it took to the stage at the Edinburgh Festival to some "considerable controversy" in 1962.

A children's play, New Clothes for the Emperor by Nicholas Stuart Gray, followed in 1963, and then a comedy, Domino by Marcel Achard with Denholm Elliott and Judy Campbell in the cast. There was a run of this show in Brighton and it was booked to open in the West End at the Savoy Theatre but Farjeon and O'Donoghue decided at the last minute not to bring it in to London at that stage, "because they were not satisfied that they had achieved its true potential". It toured provincial theatres while work continued on it, but its final appearance was at the Lyric Hammersmith in the summer of 1963.

Subsequently, another comedy, Every Other Evening, an adaptation of a French play with mother and daughter leads, Margaret and Julia Lockwood, toured the UK for eight weeks in 1964 before having a respectable run at the Phoenix Theatre in the West End.

April 1965 saw the opening at the New Arts Theatre in London of a first play, Kindly Monkeys, by Milton Hood Ward, to generally poor reviews.

In the six years of their producing partnership Farjeon and O'Donoghue also produced a variety of concerts and cabarets in the West End of London, in Dublin and in the English provinces.

Farjeon and O'Donoghue's final production was An Evening of Music Hall opening at the Chichester Festival Theatre in 1965, with the comedian Cyril Fletcher, the actor and musical star Jessie Matthews, and members of the Players' Theatre.

== Corporate theatre ==
Farjeon and O'Donogue's partnership ended by mutual agreement in 1965, with O'Donoghue becoming Registrar of the Royal Academy of Dramatic Art and Farjeon joining the actors John Hewer and Mike Hall in their newly-established and pioneering London production company which was set up to use the talents and techniques of show business to stage corporate conferences, product launches, cabarets, shows and films. For many years Farjeon was responsible for the design of all of Hewer-Hall's many productions throughout the UK and much of Western Europe and found himself in demand to create stage designs for other new companies entering the same field. His obituarist noted in The Independent that "his designs were ingenious, painstakingly crafted and planned, combining all he knew of art, architecture and theatre". He was remembered for "working all night to perfect models, create effects and tiny intricate details".

== Born Free Foundation ==
Throughout his life Farjeon had cared deeply for animals, in particular those kept in captivity in appalling conditions, and for three years in the early 1990s he was able to exercise his compassion and concern for them by working with a friend, Bill Travers of the Born Free Foundation. Farjeon accompanied him on many inspection trips to "slum" zoos in Europe, sharing their interests, their convictions, and their unhappiness at what they saw of the disturbed behaviour of thousands of wild animals held in deprived and pitiful conditions.

In 1992 Farjeon and Travers made a comprehensive study of European zoos as part of a delegation on behalf of the European Economic Community. "It was dire," reported Farjeon about one of the zoos they visited. "We gagged at the stench from the prison-like cages. Many animals were sick and undernourished. The vet with the delegation said euthanasia would be kinder for some." The Born Free Foundation holds films and photographs documenting Farjeon's and Travers' investigations abroad.

== Literary archivist ==
Farjeon's family life had brought him close to his aunt, the author and poet Eleanor Farjeon, for whose estate he became executor. As well as managing her estate and being her literary executor (a duty which took on new and unexpected responsibilities in 1972 when her hymn Morning Has Broken became an international hit when recorded by Cat Stevens) he was the curator of a large archive of her literary papers, letters and photographs and of many papers concerning her close friend the British poet Edward Thomas.

Farjeon was also the "meticulous cataloguer" of other literary and artistic archives passed down to him from both his father and mother and their families. As a result he was often consulted by writers, researchers, programme makers, curators of national museums and the producers of literary festivals. In the 1980s and 1990s he became increasingly involved as an éminence grise in literary biography and memorialization and was able to assist with the biographies of A. A. Milne, Edmund Gosse, John Gielgud, Joseph Jefferson, Edward Thomas and Eleanor Farjeon.

== Personal life ==
Farjeon married the musical comedy actor Violetta à Beckett Williams early in 1949. They lived in a Georgian house in Gospel Oak in North London, in a country home known as "Newfoundout" with acres of garden and woodland near Horsham in West Sussex, and at a farmhouse in the French Pyrénées. There were no children.

In later life, for twenty years until his death, Farjeon shared his life with the actor, broadcaster and poetry and literary anthologist Anne Harvey, though he and his wife remained married. Both women survived him.

Harvey recorded that Farjeon was "a man of many talents who remained modestly self-effacing, never convinced he had met the successes of better-known members of his family".

Bill Travers' wife, and partner in the Born Free Foundation, Dame Virginia McKenna, described him as a "gentle, modest man" who never forced his opinions on others, and remembered him for "his kindness, his loyalty and his generosity but, above all, his friendship".

Sandy Wilson wrote affectionately that he had "a charmingly shy manner which bordered at times on incoherence".

Farjeon died from prostate cancer in London at the age of 80 on 6 August 2001. He was cremated at Golders Green Crematorium in North London and his ashes were scattered at his request at his and his wife's property in West Sussex, "under the copper beech tree".

== See also ==
Farjeon family
