= Joan Jefferson Farjeon =

English scenographer and costume designer (1913–2006)

- Born: 26 May 1913; West End Lane, London, England
- Died: 8 August 2006 (aged 93); Northwood, Middlesex
- Occupations: Costume designer; Illustrator; Scenograper
- Years active: 1939–1990s

Joan Jefferson Farjeon (26 May 1913 – 8 August 2006) was an English scenographer and costume designer. Born into a literary family, she began illustrating in 1939 and began working as a sceneographer and costume designer in 1941, working in theatre productions from the 1940s to the 1990s.

== Biography ==
Farjeon was born in London's West End Lane on 26 May 1913 into a literary family. Her father, the dramatist and novelist Joseph Jefferson Farjeon, was the third child of Margaret Jefferson (daughter of Joseph Jefferson), and the novelist Benjamin Farjeon. Her American mother, Frances Wood, was friendly with the Jefferson family. Farjeon's birth was recorded in the poem Nursery Rhymes of London Town by her aunt Eleanor Farjeon in 1916. She moved to Billingshurst, Sussex during the First World War before returning to London after the war ended. In 1925, Farjeon won a solo dancing contest at the Lyric Theatre. A collection of poems, Joan's Play, was named after her in 1926, and inspired by her life in Sussex. Farjeon was educated at Lindores School in Bexhill-on-Sea, and after two years of formal education left school at age 16, enrolling at the Westminster School of Art.

After remaining homebound in her early 20s, in 1939, Farjeon illustrated a collection of plays entitled Granny Gray for Eleanor Farjeon. She gained experience painting scenery for the Little Revues of Herbert Farjeon, leading the writer and friend Nicholas Stuart Gray and her aunt to persuade her to leave home and become independent. Farjeon began working as a scenic and costume designer in 1941, and lodged with members of the Theatre Royal, Windsor. Two years later, Tyrone Guthrie invited Farjeon to design for him at Liverpool Playhouse until callup papers meant she worked on land in Ditchling, Sussex. After producing designs for the musical Song of Norway in 1946, she worked on Vernon Sylvaine's comedy Will Any Gentleman? in 1950. Later West End plays Farjeon was an illustrator were Beauty and the Beast in 1950, Agatha Christie's The Hollow in 1951, The Princess and the Swineherd in 1952, the puppet play Rapunzel in 1953, Peter Hall's 1953 production of Henry IV at the Arts Theatre, 1954's The Hunters and the Henwife and The Marvellous Story of Puss in Boots, The Imperial Nightingale and New Clothes for the Emperor adapted from Hans Christian Andersen in 1957, The Other Cinderella in 1958, Christie's Verdict that same year at the Strand Theatre and Lock Up Your Daughters at the Mermaid Theatre in 1959.

Farjeon worked with James Roose-Evans as resident designer at the Pitlochry Festival Theatre in 1960. In 1962, she illustrated on The Seventh Swan, The Wrong Side of the Moon in 1966, Lights Up in 1967 and New Lamps for Old in 1968. In 1968, Farjeon was made resident designer at the Webber Douglas School of Dramatic Art, producing productions in the Chanticleer Theatre through the 1990s. Outside of designing she became amanuensis "manager" for the television cooks Johnnie Cradock and Fanny Cradock sometime after 1955.

== Personal life ==
In 2003 Farjeon moved to Denville Hall, the actor's retirement home in Northwood, Middlesex. A collection of her works dispatched to the University of Bristol's Theatre Department for observation for students. She died on 8 August 2006, aged 93, the last of the Farjeon dynesty.

== Reception and collections ==
Anne Harvey of The Independent wrote of Farjeon, "She was recognised throughout her working life as an exceptional craftswoman, with a sharp, true eye for fine detail and accuracy and an enviable gift for draughtsmanship." She noted the designer's works "were so precise that they could be sent to a theatre abroad, and recreated for another production." Along with a collection of her costume and set designs and notebooks relating to her work in Nicolas Stuart Gray productions contained in the University of Bristol, the Harvard Depository of the Harvard Library holds some of Farjeon's personal papers and objects connected to her.

== See also ==
Farjeon family
