= Richard O'Donoghue (actor) =

Actor, theatrical entrepreneur and administrator

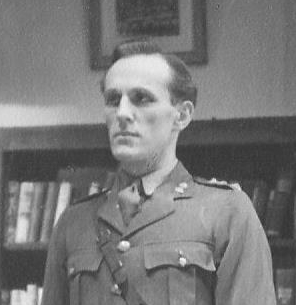
- On stage, in character, 1949
- Born: 13 September 1920; Epsom, Surrey, England
- Died: 4 January 2002 (aged 81); London, England
- Education: Guildhall School of Music and Drama, London, England
- Occupations: Actor, theatrical entrepreneur and administrator
- Known for: Registrar-Administrator, RADA

John Christopher Richard O'Donoghue (13 September 1920 – 4 January 2002) was an English actor, theatrical entrepreneur and administrator. After training as an actor he performed in repertoire before his call-up in World War II. He served in the British Indian Army and by the end of hostilities had risen to the rank of major. After demobilisation he briefly returned to acting before working for 15 years in management and production in the West End theatre in London, firstly with theatrical entrepreneurs Sir Bronson Albery and his son Sir Donald Albery and then in partnership with Gervase Farjeon. In 1967 he became Registrar and Administrator of RADA (Royal Academy of Dramatic Art), a position of influence over generations of acting and theatre production students which he held for 20 years until his retirement.

== Early life ==
O'Donoghue was born on 13 September 1920 in Epsom, Surrey, the son of Rupert John Gordon O'Donoghue, a chartered architect and Fellow of the Royal Institute of British Architects (FRIBA), and Nellie May O'Donoghue, née Barnes. From the age of 18 O'Donoghue studied acting at the Guildhall School of Music and Drama in the City of London.

== Early stage career ==
On leaving acting school, and awaiting call-up into the services in the first year of World War II in Europe, in 1940 O'Donoghue joined the Hull Repertory Company at the Hull New Theatre in Kingston upon Hull, East Riding of Yorkshire. He was to act in a four-month season of regularly changing drama running from July to October. By the end of the season O'Donoghue had garnered a series of good reviews in the local press: "Richard O'Donoghue ... playing with magnificent emotional strength" read one. The engagement coincided with the start of the Hull Blitz; German bombing raids on the city began in June 1940. O'Donoghue recalled performing "with German bombs falling nightly". After his engagement in Hull O'Donoghue briefly joined a national Shakespeare tour before being called up into the services.

== Army service ==
O'Donoghue was enlisted early in 1941 in the British Indian Army. He served briefly in the ranks as a gunner before an emergency commission as a 2nd Lieutenant in the Royal Indian Army Service Corps on 17 August 1941. In October 1943 he was listed as Captain and by October 1945 as Major. At the time he was recognised not as the youngest but certainly as one of the youngest majors in the British Indian Army. He later described his war experiences as "part grim", but he found occasions to organise entertainments and was able frequently to broadcast his poetry on All India Radio. He was demobilised in 1947.

== Post-war acting career ==
After demobilisation O'Donoghue returned to the stage and acting, finding work at first with the repertory company Aurora Productions Limited, then resident at the Little Theatre in Great Yarmouth, Norfolk. In the summer of 1949 he moved on to the Palace Theatre, Westcliff-on-Sea, Essex to join the Harry Hanson Court Players repertory company. He continued as a lead actor with this company when they moved on for a winter season at the Royal Hippodrome Theatre in Eastbourne, East Sussex, with O'Donoghue taking the lead role of Garry Essendine in Noël Coward's Present Laughter. January saw the end of the season at Eastbourne and a return to the Palace at Westcliff-on-Sea for a further long season, ending in November. 1951 found O'Donoghue in a farce at the Pavilion Theatre, Torquay, Devon and in a thriller at the Opera House in Cheltenham, Gloucestershire.

== Theatrical management ==
O'Donoghue gave up acting at the end of 1951 to take up theatrical management. He joined the Albery family theatrical management company in London. Sir Bronson Albery and his son Donald, both theatre entrepreneurs, owned and ran two almost back-to-back West End theatres, Wyndham's Theatre in Charing Cross Road and the New Theatre (now the Noël Coward Theatre) in St Martin's Lane. They also leased the Criterion Theatre in Piccadilly Circus. The Alberys were the producers and managers of many new and revived plays and musicals at their theatres and other venues and O'Donoghue was well-placed to learn from them the business of production and management, running theatres, choosing and financing shows, organising publicity for them and getting the right casts together. He stayed with the Albery company until 1959.

== Theatrical entrepreneur ==
For a number of years while O'Donoghue was working with the Alberys, Sandy Wilson's pastiche 1920s musical The Boy Friend had been playing to full houses for a then record-breaking five years at Wyndham's Theatre. The show's Director of Production was Gervase Farjeon and when The Boy Friend finally closed in 1959 he and O'Donoghue, having worked together at Wyndham's for some years, joined forces as business partners to form their own production company, Farjeon & O'Donoghue Ltd.

From their offices at 30 St George Street in Mayfair, London, O'Donoghue and Farjeon produced and presented plays and shows for the next eight years with the intention being to present productions of merit.

The first was The Doctor and the Devils, an adaptation of a screenplay by the Welsh poet and writer Dylan Thomas. It was based on the true story of William Burke and William Hare, who in 1828 in Edinburgh, Scotland, murdered at least 16 people and sold their bodies for anatomical dissection. After being first seen in Glasgow in 1961 it took to the stage at the Edinburgh Festival to some "considerable controversy" in 1962. It then played at the Sunderland Empire Theatre, Sunderland, County Durham.

A national tour and a short season at the Duchess Theatre in the West End in April 1963, named Savagery and Delights, in which Agnes Bernelle presented the songs and poems of German satirists from Frank Wedekind to Bertolt Brecht was not much appreciated. It achieved some controversy – and welcome publicity – when Bernelle's husband, Desmond Leslie, physically attacked the critic Bernard Levin live on television in protest at his review of the show.

A children's play, New Clothes for the Emperor by Nicholas Stuart Gray, at The Royal, Stratford, followed in 1963, and then a comedy, Domino by Marcel Achard with Denholm Elliott and Judy Campbell in the cast. There was a run of this show in Brighton and it was booked to open in the West End at the Savoy Theatre but O'Donoghue and Farjeon decided at the last minute not to bring it in to London at that stage, "because they were not satisfied that they had achieved its true potential". It toured provincial theatres while work continued on it, but its final appearance was at the Lyric Hammersmith in the summer of 1963.

Subsequently, another comedy, Every Other Evening, an adaptation of a French play commissioned by O'Donoghue and Farjeon, with mother and daughter leads, Margaret and Julia Lockwood, toured the UK for eight weeks in 1964 before having a respectable run at the Phoenix Theatre in the West End.

April 1965 saw the opening at the New Arts Theatre in London of Kindly Monkeys, the first play by Milton Hood Ward, to generally poor reviews.

In the six years of their producing partnership O'Donoghue and Farjeon also produced a variety of concerts and cabarets in the West End of London, in Dublin and in the English provinces.

O'Donoghue and Farjeon's final production together was An Evening of Music Hall opening at the Chichester Festival Theatre in 1965, with the comedian Cyril Fletcher, the actor and musical star Jessie Matthews, and members of the Players' Theatre, London.

O'Donoghue and Farjeon's partnership ended by mutual agreement in 1966, though O'Donoghue went on to produce two further shows. After a short appearance at the Forum Theatre, Billingham, County Durham, Molière's The Imaginary Invalid opened at the Vaudeville Theatre in the West End in April 1968 to a poor reception.

Finally, in October 1969 O'Donoghue himself appeared with his future wife, the actor Ann King, in Dear Mr Kenyon! at the Leeds Institute Gallery. The show, devised by O'Donoghue, was a narrative reading from the letters of Robert Browning and Elizabeth Barrett, presenting the story of their courtship and marriage in their own words. It was reprised with the same cast in aid of the Save The Children Fund at Hartwell Manor, Northampton, England in February 1970.

== RADA Registrar-Administrator ==
At the beginning of 1967 O'Donoghue answered an advertisement for a new senior management position at RADA (Royal Academy of Dramatic Art), one of the leading drama schools in London. On the basis of his experience in the theatre as actor, manager and producer, O'Donoghue was appointed the Academy's Administrator-Registrar on 1 March 1967. This was a novel post at the Academy; previously, administration had been carried out by the Principal in addition to his primary duties. Lack of money had made the appointment of an Administrator impossible until the 1960s when the Academy began to benefit from funds arising from the will of the playwright George Bernard Shaw.

O'Donoghue occupied a ground floor office off the entrance hall of RADA's building at 62–64 Gower Street, London W1. He reported to the Principal, at that time Hugh Cruttwell, on the running of the Academy generally and to the Academy's Council on matters pertaining to its conduct and business.

O'Donoghue's rôles within the Academy were various. Primarily he supported RADA's main function by arranging the admission of student actors and stage managers, supporting them through their time at the Academy and organising the academic services which supported teaching and learning. Falling within his purview was the administration of courses, timetabling, and organising student records and assessment. He ensured students' fees were received, provided grant support and visa negotiation when necessary, and administered the awarding of scholarships. The discipline of students and their health and welfare were also his responsibility, and counselling when required.

O'Donoghue supported the Principal and the academic faculty of about 25 teachers who were augmented by a number of visiting specialist teachers and directors and theatre practice staff, such as the production manager, resident stage manager and chief stage electrician. His other duties included the financial management of the Academy and the running of the Academy's estate which consisted of the eight-floor building on Gower Street and a similar-sized building, with a theatre, backing onto it on Malet Street. He employed the staff necessary within it, such as those involved in security, maintenance, and catering.

O'Donoghue was Clerk to RADA's Council where he was responsible for ensuring the effective operation of the Academy's overall governance, and advising the Council on RADA's Royal Charter and Rules and the councillors' legal responsibilities.

In addition, O'Donoghue managed the Academy's two theatres: the 500-seat Vanbrugh Theatre on Malet Street and the 120-seat Little Theatre (renamed the GBS in 1978) in the basement of the Gower Street building. In 1986 he supervised the conversion of a rehearsal and teaching room into a small studio theatre providing experience of open stage and in-the-round production.

He was also Secretary of the Vanbrugh Theatre Club which facilitated audiences for 20 major student productions a year playing to an average of 92% of capacity at evening performances.

O'Donoghue was not involved in teaching, though he followed the progress of the students with interest and often dropped in to watch classes and rehearsals. He met all new students early, as one of his most important tasks was to oversee the regular audition process for the thousand or so aspiring young actors every year who applied to train at RADA, every one of whom was auditioned. Of that huge number of hopefuls RADA had the capacity for at most only 20 twice a year, all of whom would have to show sufficient talent be offered a place. "Some of the unsuccessful candidates are indignant and angry; some of them are hurt. After auditions I have had applicants crying on my shoulder", O'Donoghue told The Sunday Telegraph in 1984. "There are still a lot of Mrs Worthingtons", O'Donoghue went on, referring to Noël Coward's imploring song Don't put your daughter on the stage, Mrs Worthington. O'Donoghue and the Academy's Principal were described by the newspaper as "humane men who love the theatre and wish to encourage its eager young acolytes, yet it is their duty to preside over what must be one of the most rigorously exclusive institutions in the land."

The actor Kenneth Branagh remembered being greeted at his RADA audition by O'Donoghue in 1979: "Richard O'Donoghue, the registrar, welcomed a group of about ten of us and promptly learned and remembered all our names. Very impressive." Branagh graduated in 1981. Earlier, another student, an American, recalled that his acceptance into the Academy by O'Donoghue in 1971 was an important foundation stone for racial diversity at RADA: Doyle Richmond was auditioned by O'Donoghue and became "the first Black [actor] ... to be accepted into the internationally famous academy". Richmond graduated in 1973. In 1976 another actor, Michael Simkins, met O'Donoghue for the first time when being accepted for the acting course. He later described him as "a tall, lean man wearing a smart blazer, Garrick Club tie and Jermyn Street suede slip-ons ... A smell of polished leather and old books hangs in the air around him. He extends a bony hand, his fingers immaculately manicured, shirt cuffs fastened by solid silver links extending just the right length below the cuff of his blazer." Simkins graduated in 1978.

O'Donoghue also kept track through the Academy's archives of those who had graduated long before he arrived. A 1982 BBC Television documentary about the playwright Joe Orton, who had been an acting student at the Academy thirty years before, saw O'Donoghue delving into RADA's admission books to find the name John Orton (his name when a student) and talking to the interviewer about how Orton's acting abilities had been viewed by the Academy's then Principal.

O'Donoghue worked in close cooperation with the RADA Principal, Hugh Cruttwell, who had arrived at the Academy a year before him. The pair worked together for 16 years, before Cruttwell left at the end of 1983, to be replaced by Oliver Neville. Together they worked to improve the Academy's offering. Within a few months of O'Donoghue's arrival he oversaw the start of the first new course since the 1962 formal establishment of stage management training, with the foundation of a course for student directors in 1967. O'Donoghue organised the establishment of further diploma courses in the following years, mostly in technical theatre disciplines, including property making, scenic painting and design, and stage carpentry. A course in stage electrics was added later. Refresher courses for acting professionals were also organised by O'Donoghue for two or three weeks every summer. He was additionally largely responsible for the establishment of an American Summer School to bring American acting students to the Academy during the long summer vacations.

It fell to O'Donoghue to organise two royal events at the Academy. Queen Elizabeth The Queen Mother visited RADA on 5 March 1970 and Elizabeth II and her husband Prince Philip, Duke of Edinburgh visited on 19 November 1980 as part of the Academy's 75th anniversary celebrations.

Another responsibility which came to O'Donoghue was negotiation with the George Bernard Shaw estate. As a one-third residuary beneficiary (with the British Museum and the National Gallery of Ireland) of Shaw's will, RADA benefitted financially (particularly after the success of My Fair Lady, the stage and subsequent film musical adaptation of Shaw's play Pygmalion, the royalties from which had already been donated by Shaw to the Academy in 1912) and O'Donoghue was much involved with the administration of RADA's substantial benefit from the playwright's legacy. He additionally aided Michael Holroyd in the research for his 4-volume biography of Shaw which was published between 1988 and 1992. Shaw had been on the Council of RADA from 1912, soon after the Academy's establishment, until his death in 1950. He also helped to finance the 1927 building on Gower Street with a gift of £5000, and in the 1950s there had been considerable legal wrangling and controversy, in which RADA was deeply involved, over the settling of Shaw's estate. O'Donoghue was able to provide much information for Holroyd on all these matters from the Academy's extensive archives.

Towards the end of O'Donoghue's tenure at RADA plans began to be laid for the rebuilding and modernisation of a large part of the Academy's buildings on Gower Street and Malet Street. In 1984 Sir Richard Attenborough, at that time President of RADA, suggested to the architect Bryan Avery that he might "look at" the Academy. He asked Avery if he thought improvements could be made to the "labyrinthine warren of disconnected spaces". O'Donoghue necessarily became involved with Avery in the investigations into possible redevelopment. Some initial proposals of "tweaks" for the interior were made, which O'Donoghue saw were carried out. It was clear, however, that only a major architectural intervention could unlock the potential of the Gower Street/Malet Street site, or the Academy would have to move its premises elsewhere. O'Donoghue was aware either option would take years to fund and achieve. Despite the fact that he knew he would be long retired before a redevelopment or a move could be completed, O'Donoghue was heavily involved in the setting up of the necessary working party and in the laying of plans for the future.

In its obituary of O'Donoghue the RADA Magazine remarked of his time as Administrator-Registrar that "he loved every moment of dealing with the ups and downs of his job, from running the theatre and dealing with the domestic and other staff to coping with the flooded cellars and broken boilers, to setting up auditions for prospective students and dealing with their grants and welfare."

Among many well known actors who graduated from RADA during O'Donoghue's time in office were Stephanie Beacham, Richard Beckinsale, Sir Kenneth Branagh, Ralph Fiennes, Jane Horrocks, Robert Lindsay, Sir Jonathan Pryce, Alan Rickman, Sir Mark Rylance, Fiona Shaw, Dame Imelda Staunton and James Wilby.

O'Donoghue retired from RADA in the summer of 1986, to be replaced by a Burser/Registrar who, following administrative reorganisation, would be expected to have comprehensive financial and managerial experience rather than the wide experience of theatre which O'Donoghue had brought to the position.

== Retirement ==
In retirement O'Donoghue contributed to Dictionary of Theatre, edited by David Pickering and published in 1988.

In 1990 O'Donoghue was appointed Honorary Secretary of the Society of Designer-Craftsmen which had represented professional designer-makers across various craft disciplines, including wood, metal, glass and textiles, since 1887. He enjoyed continuing to deal with creative people and encouraging young talent while at the same time organising the Society into efficient working order. After ten years illness forced him to give up this position.

== Poetry ==
O'Donoghue was a lover of poetry and wrote poems throughout his life. He published two collections of his work: Poems for a Princess was brought out by The Mitre Press in 1975 and Verses on the Way to the Pub by Merlin Books in 1993.

== Personal life ==
O'Donoghue married twice. His first wife was Enid Williams. They married in Westminster, London in April 1957. His second wife was Dorothy King, the actor working as Ann King. They married in Kensington, London, in July 1971. She survived him.

O'Donoghue died in London on 4 January 2002.
