= After Dark (1932 film) =

1932 British film by Albert Parker

- Opening titles
- Directed by: Albert Parker
- Written by: John Barrow
- Based on: After Dark by Joseph Jefferson Farjeon
- Produced by: Hugh Perceval
- Starring: Horace Hodges; Hugh Williams; Grethe Hansen
- Cinematography: Geoffrey Faithfull
- Edited by: Ann Cullingworth
- Production company: Fox Film Company
- Distributed by: Fox Film Company
- Release date: October 1932
- Running time: 45 minutes
- Country: United Kingdom
- Language: English

After Dark is a 1932 British crime film directed by Albert Parker and starring Horace Hodges, Hugh Williams and Grethe Hansen. It was written by John Barrow based on the 1926 play of the same title by J. Jefferson Farjeon, and made at Walton Studios as a quota quickie.

== Plot ==
Richard Morton, returning to England with famous emeralds, is drugged and robbed on a train by thief Henry Lea. With the assistance of Alva, Lea's niece, who was unaware of her uncle's criminal activities, Morton discovers that the stolen gems have been hidden inside an antique clock recently sold to a collector. Morton, Alva, Lea, and Lea's criminal partner Harvey all arrive at the collector's house in pursuit of the emeralds. Following a chase during which Alva proves to the collector that she and her uncle are actually helping Morton, Harvey manages to escape with the clock. The collector then reveals that he had already found and removed the emeralds.

== Cast ==
- Horace Hodges as Thaddeus Cattermole Brompton
- Hugh Williams as Richard Morton
- Grethe Hansen as Alva Lea
- George Barraud as George Harvey
- Henry Oscar as Higgins
- Ian Fleming as Henry Lea
- Polly Emery as Mrs. Hannah Thirkettle
- Arthur Padbury as Wilfred Thirtkettle
- Lucille Lisle as Vivienne Roberts

== Reception ==
Kine Weekly wrote: "Amusing crook comedy ... Plot is very well put over with a blend of humour, mystery, and lively characterisation. "

Picturegoer wrote: "Breezy and amusing little crook comedy."
