= Walter Webster =

Walter Webster may refer to:

- Walter Ernest Webster (1877–1959), British figure and portrait painter
- Wally Webster (1895–1980), footballer, played for Walsall, Lincoln City, Sheffield United, Torquay United, Rochdale and Barrow
- Walter Webster (footballer, born 1906) (1906–1942), played for Rochdale, Sheffield Wednesday, Oswestry and Guildford
