= Violetta Farjeon =

- Born: Violetta à Beckett Williams; 27 September 1923; Kensington, London, England
- Died: 16 July 2015 (aged 91); Worthing, West Sussex, England
- Education: Conservatoire de Paris
- Occupations: Actor and singer
- Years active: 1941—2003
- Known for: Created the part of "Hortense" in The Boy Friend
- Spouse: Gervase Farjeon
- Parents: Christopher à Beckett Williams (father); Aimée Violet Evelyn Theyre (mother)

Violetta à Beckett Williams (27 September 1923—16 July 2015) was an English actor and singer who spoke fluent French and specialised in the performance of roguish and sometimes suggestive French chansons. For most of World War II she entertained Free French Forces in London and then joined the Late Joys Victorian music hall company at the Players' Theatre. She made her name with a five-year West End run playing "Hortense" in the Players' original 1953 London production of Sandy Wilson's pastiche 1920s musical The Boy Friend. In her work in musical comedy she used as her stage name the single word Violetta. As an actor she was styled by her married name, Violetta Farjeon, following her marriage to Gervase Farjeon in 1949.

== Early life ==
Farjeon was born in Kensington, London on 27 September 1923 to Captain Christopher à Beckett Williams (1890—1956) and Aimée Violet Evelyn Theyre (1886—1962). Her father was an English classical composer and arranger, a writer of film scores, and a music teacher, and under the names Beckett Williams and Sinjon Wood an author of guidebooks and novels.

Farjeon's mother was born with the surname Smith, but it was changed to an older family name of Theyre while she was a child. She was a linguist and teacher of modern languages and was a concert pianist who professionally was known as Violet Clarence. She trained at the Royal Academy of Music and then studied in Vienna under Theodor Leschetizky and in Paris under Raoul Pugno and Isidor Philipp.

In many printed references Farjeon is incorrectly described as French but, though brought up in France and speaking French, she was born in England and her mother's parents were English. Farjeon's father's family was also English.

After Farjeon's birth the family moved to the town of Bagnères-de-Bigorre in the Hautes-Pyrénées, France where she spent her childhood and became fluent in French and English while her father researched and wrote his guidebooks The High Pyrénées, Summer and Winter (published 1928) and Winter Sport in Europe (published 1929).

With both her father and mother being musicians Farjeon was encouraged to study music from a very young age and while her parents returned permanently to England, in her early teens she entered the Conservatoire de Paris to study music.

== Fleeing France during World War II ==
In May 1940, while she was only 16 and still at the Conservatoire, the Nazis invaded France and advanced towards Paris. Along with millions of Parisians Farjeon fled the capital (by what means is unknown) and in the company of many hundreds of thousands of refugees arrived on the south coast of France in June 1940 with the aim of reaching Britain.

Farjeon reported that she escaped France on the last collier leaving Nice for Tangier. The evacuation of British civilian refugees who had assembled at various ports on the Provençal coast was organised by the British Admiralty, using whatever shipping could be assembled, most of it cargo ships, between 23 and 26 June.

A number of British coal ships picked up mostly civilian refugees at Nice and Cannes before calling in at Marseille, Sète and Port-Vendres to take on more and then made their way to Gibraltar and Tangier. One coal ship, Ashcroft, was delayed by engine trouble and so was the last to leave France. She made the voyage towards Tangier unescorted and was attacked by an Italian submarine. The sole gunner returned fire and the ship made a smoke screen enabling her to escape. Aside from the danger from Italian submarines, conditions on the week-long voyage were filthy and insanitary, with dangerous overcrowding and a severe shortage of food and water.

After her arrival in Tangier Farjeon trans-shipped to a passenger vessel to join a protective convoy for the journey to Britain. Like all convoys on this route, Farjeon's took a wide diversion into the Atlantic and around Ireland on its way to Britain in order to avoid naval mines.

Farjeon arrived in London just before her seventeenth birthday in September 1940. The Blitz, the sustained campaign of German aerial bombing of London, had just begun. "We went straight to an air-raid shelter," she recalled. "I had no idea about the bombardment of London. It was quite a shock."

== Entertaining Free French Forces ==
Farjeon wanted to take part in the war effort and having spent all her life so far in France, she joined the Corps des Volontaires françaises or CVF (English: The Corps of French Female Volunteers), a military auxiliary service established by the Free French Forces in London in November 1940. With her musical knowledge and teenage vivacity she was assigned to entertainment and was involved for the duration of the war and for some time afterwards in entertainment for the Free French Forces in London. By her own estimation she was not very good at it to start with. Of one of her early performances for the military she later recalled: "The poor soldiers had to sit through it. I was so bad at the beginning. And they couldn't leave because there was a sergeant at the door!"

But Farjeon persevered and as the war came to an end, with an act honed by the wartime experience of performing for mostly young French men, in 1947 Farjeon embarked in her mid-twenties on a professional stage career utilising to her advantage the theatrical persona she had developed of a "vibrant, roguish and bubbly" and occasionally saucy French chanteuse. It was an act which was to serve her as a character actor and performer for her entire career.

== The Players' Theatre ==
Farjeon's first professional engagements were in the Late Joys Victorian music hall shows staged nightly at the Players' Theatre in London. The audiences liked her, and the performer Hattie Jacques, already a stalwart of the Late Joys, took to writing and directing highly successful "roguish and suggestive French chansons" for her.

Farjeon was to work almost exclusively with the Players' Theatre company from 1947 as a member of the regular troupe of performers who presented the Late Joys music hall acts for which the theatre was famed, together with their annual Christmas pantomimes and occasional one-act plays. As "Violetta", her given name which she used for her single stage name at the Players', Farjeon continued to present her unique act there into her late seventies, making her last appearance in June 2003.

== The Boy Friend ==
Farjeon made her name in the West End with a part written especially for her in a show which transferred there from the Players' Theatre in 1954. The company staged a comic pastiche musical of the 1920s written by Sandy Wilson and called The Boy Friend. It opened at the Players' in 1953 and after being extended played a short season at the Embassy Theatre in Swiss Cottage in London before opening at Wyndham's Theatre in the West End in January 1954. It ran for five years and a then record-breaking 2,078 performances. For over four years from its opening night at the Players' Theatre Farjeon played a chic but exuberant French maid, Hortense, who opened the show. Wilson recalled of the first night that "from the moment the curtain rose ... with Violetta perched on the edge of the sofa, telephone receiver in one hand and feather duster held aloft in the other, the audience adored The Boy Friend".

In the second act, Farjeon had her own number, It's Nicer in Nice, with which she regularly stopped the show. Wilson described her presentation of the song as "a miniature Follies routine, in which Violetta skipped and cavorted round the stage in company with the boys and girls, receiving her calls at the end in a plethora of bobs and kisses which she herself remembered from her childhood, when a touring revue visited the village in the Pyrenees where she was living." Wilson also recalled that this dance routine was "so vigorous that at many performances her vital assets often popped out of her costume and were on full display to the astonished audience."

Ten years after The Boy Friend opened, Farjeon reprised the character of Hortense in another Sandy Wilson musical, Divorce Me, Darling!, a 1930s pastiche sequel. After a run at the Players' Theatre it opened at the Globe Theatre (now known as the Gielgud Theatre) in the West End in 1965. It was less successful than The Boy Friend, suffering mostly indifferent reviews and running for only 91 performances, but Farjeon had another show-stopping number (dueting with Robert Parvin): Paradise Hotel.

In 1990, at the age of 66, Farjeon brought Hortense back for a final time in a Sunday night gala revival of The Boy Friend with almost the entire original cast at the Duchess Theatre in the West End. The theatrical newspaper, The Stage, reported that "Violetta, plumper than we remember but still enchanting, high-kicked her way across the stage" and won a standing ovation.

== Other roles ==
Outside the Players' Theatre, Farjeon had sporadic work as a character actor, usually in French roles, using her full married name of Violetta Farjeon.

She appeared in four films, playing a barmaid in A Day To Remember (1953), a cameo role in The Prince and the Showgirl (1957), a parent in The Pure Hell of St Trinian's (1960), and a French serving maid in Lancelot and Guinevere (1963). Of The Prince and the Showgirl, starring Laurence Olivier and Marilyn Monroe, Farjeon recalled that "It was lovely, because she [Monroe] never used to turn up on the set, and we were paid by the day".

Her television roles included character performances in Armchair Theatre and Honour Bright (1958), Somerset Maugham Hour (1960), Harpers West One (1961) The Creative Impulse (1962) Sergeant Cork (1964), Jason King (1971) and three episodes of Around the World in Eighty Days (1989).

As herself she made appearances in two panel games: One Minute Please on BBC Radio in 1952 and Take a Letter on ITV in 1963.

Her fluent French placed her in a television series aimed at teaching French: Répondez s'il vous plaît on BBC Television in 1969—70.

== Personal life ==
When Farjeon joined the Players' Theatre in 1947 she met one of the directors of the company, Gervase Farjeon, the son of the lyricist, playwright, presenter of revues and theatre manager Herbert Farjeon. They married early in 1949 and lived in a Georgian house in Gospel Oak in North London, in a country home known as "Newfoundout" with acres of garden and woodland near Horsham in West Sussex, and at a farmhouse in the French Pyrénées, the area where Farjeon had spent her childhood. They had no children, and in the early 1980s they separated, but did not divorce. He died in 2001.

Farjeon was famous for her inability to remember names and worked around the embarrassment by addressing all her show business colleagues as "Mon petit chou" or "Ma choupette" (English: "My little cabbage", a French term of endearment). As a consequence she was known throughout the entertainment business as "Chou".

Farjeon died in Worthing Hospital following a fall at "Newfoundout" in West Sussex on 16 July 2015 at the age of 91.

Her friend and colleague, the musical star Sheila Matthews, said of her: "She was a lovely light-hearted person who was adored in the entertainment profession for her wonderful generosity, both personal and professional, to her friends and fellow performers."

== See also ==
Farjeon family
