= Ruth Kettlewell =

British actress (1913–2007)

- Born: Ruth Anne Berry; 13 April 1913; Worcester, Worcestershire, England
- Died: 17 July 2007 (aged 94); London, England
- Occupation: Actress
- Spouse: The Rev Robert Kettlewell

Ruth Kettlewell (born Ruth Anne Berry; 13 April 1913 – 17 July 2007) was an English actress. She was, by her own admission, a "character bag"; that is, a face recognisable to regular television viewers, but not a household name.

== Early life ==
Kettlewell was born as the second daughter of a clergyman, and was educated at Casterton School and at art college. She married a curate, the Rev Robert Kettlewell, at the age of eighteen. Her husband died from the scarlet fever that he caught while serving as a wartime army padre. She herself served in the Women's Land Army from 1942 to 1946.

== Career ==
=== Early career ===
After playing small parts in many amateur dramatic productions, Kettlewell began her career in repertory theatre at the Little Theatre, Great Yarmouth; first with Aurora Productions Limited and later with the Great Yarmouth Repertory Company. By the late 1950s, she had managed to secure small West End roles. In 1959, she had her first film role in Room at the Top. She also acted in Norwegian for a Scandinavian children's film.

=== TV and Radio breakthroughs ===
In the 1960s, Kettlewell's television career unfolded and she worked alongside the likes of Harry Worth, Joan Sims and Deryck Guyler. She is perhaps best known for her role in the early episodes of All Gas and Gaiters, where she played Mrs Grace Pugh-Critchley, the Dean's wife. In 1966, she had a small role in the seminal Cathy Come Home.

A specialist in landladies and mothers-in-law, she was equally at home with both adult and children's material. In the early 1970s, she played alongside the Scottish comedy double-act Mike Hope and Albie Keen in BBC TV's Hope and Keens Crazy House, later reprised as Hope and Keen's Crazy Bus. Like many actors, she continued to work well into her eighties.

In her obituary, The Independent noted that "By her own admission ...Ruth Kettlewell often played battleaxes, but it kept her in regular work...for half a century, sometimes only in fleeting roles. A lifelong Christian, she even felt sympathy for those on the receiving end of her characters' stern actions."

== Later life ==
A devout Anglo-Catholic and an active member of the Actors’ Church Union, she visited the shrine of Our Lady of Walsingham on numerous occasions. She directed many amateur productions with a devotional theme for her church, St Augustine of Canterbury, Highgate, where she also served as a churchwarden and a sacristan. She died on 17 July 2007 in London.

== Filmography ==
=== Film ===
- Room at the Top (1959) - Thespians Member (uncredited)
- Friends and Neighbours (1959) - Woman in club
- Sons and Lovers (1960) - Mrs. Bonner
- Edgar Wallace Mysteries - (The Clue of the New Pin (1961 film)) - (1961) - Mrs. Rushby
- The Yellow Teddy Bears (1963) - Mrs. Seymour
- Oh! What a Lovely War (1969) - Duchess Sophie (uncredited)
- No Blade of Grass (1970) - Fat Woman
- Zeppelin (1971) - Mrs. Parker
- Professor Popper's Problem (1974) - Meter Maid
- Adventures of a Private Eye (1977) - Mrs. Grimpton
- The Black Panther (1977)
- Crystalstone (1987) - Dolores
- Great Balls of Fire! (1989) - Dowager
- Funny Bones (1995) - Camilla Powell

=== Television ===
- Swallows and Amazons (1963) as Mrs. Jackson
- All Gas and Gaiters (1966-1969) - Grace Pugh-Critchley / Mrs. Beems
- On the Buses (1970-1971) - the Nurse
- The Good Life (1975) - Woman
- The Howerd Confessions (1976) - the Magistrate
- Juliet Bravo (1980) - the Magistrate
- In Loving Memory (1980) - Big Madge Butley
- Don't Wait Up (1984) - Mrs Fletcher
- That's My Boy (1984) - Miss Falkender
