= Aurora Productions Limited =

Repertory Theatre Company in Yarmouth, England

Aurora Productions Limited was a British Repertory Theatre Company presenting its majority of plays in The Little Theatre, Great Yarmouth, a seaside holiday resort in the East of England. The Company produced plays by contemporary playwrights on a weekly basis, rehearsing for the following week during the day and performing evenings on six days with a Saturday matinee.

Aurora Productions was founded in 1946 with actors largely drawn from the WWII military, post demobilisation. After playing a short season in Falkirk, Scotland, Aurora Productions took over the lease for the Little Theatre, Great Yarmouth, from the incumbent repertory company. Aurora Productions ceased its connection with the Little Theatre at the end of 1951.

Though often a poor business venture, repertory theatre was in many cases an actor's first job and training ground, and a springboard to a chosen career in the performing arts. Repertory companies presented a diverse range and high quality of play to an audience often remote from the cultural centres. Aurora Productions was no exception.

In the five years Aurora Productions Limited was associated with the repertory theatre, new plays by A P Dearsley, Bridget Chetwynde and John Davenport, and Macgregor Urquhart were staged. The company produced a figure approaching 200 different plays with appearances for 180 and more actors, among which included Ruth Kettlewell, Donald Adams, Richard O'Donoghue, John Franklyn-Robbins, Gabrielle Hamilton, Frank Pemberton, Derek Bond, and Joss Ackland.

== History ==
=== Post War ===
The company, Aurora Productions Ltd, is formed with directors Peter Elliston and R E Johnson with the intention of staging plays.

The first productions are presented in Dunfermline in the year 1946, with Mervyn R Pinfield as Producer. Following an Arts Council of Great Britain initiative to sponsor or encourage a repertory company in each of Scotland's main towns, Aurora Productions Ltd announce the proposal to run a play each week in Falkirk and stay indefinitely if the reception is good.

The company has 12 professional players, mainly ex-service personnel.

Under the name of the Falkirk Repertory Company, Aurora Productions present their first play, "Love in a Mist" by Kenneth Horne at the Town Hall Falkirk. Kenneth Lascelles assumes role as production manager. After a brief period, Aurora Productions sever ties with Kenneth Lascelles and Mervyn R Pinfield assumes his original position.

After a local Falkirk organisation objects to the continuing use of the Town Hall by Aurora Productions, the Town Council reverse the decision to offer a long-term lease. Mr Lascelles announces his intention to form his own repertory company under the name of the Falkirk Repertory Theatre Company.

Aurora Productions present their final performance at Falkirk with "The First Mrs Fraser" by St. John Ervine.

=== East of England & Great Yarmouth ===
The County Repertory Company, under the Management of Mr R W Schofield and Leaseholder of the Little Theatre, make their last performance. Under arrangement with Mr R W Schofield, Aurora Productions begin "A Season of Famous Plays", six weeks at the Little Theatre Great Yarmouth, with a view to continuing repertory performances indefinitely, conditional on sufficient support. The Season opens with "No Evidence for Crime", a new play by Macgregor Urquhart, the resident producer with The County Repertory Company. Plays are presented over the same time in Cromer at the Olympia.

Following the sudden death of R W Schofield at 46 years of age, Peter Elliston takes on the lease for The Little Theatre. Aurora Productions continue their season into the winter at the Little Theatre with "It's a Boy" by Austin Melford. The cast is revised to include former players from Falkirk as well as the producer, Mervyn R Pinfield.

Aurora Production's touring company, having recently secured the touring rights to the play "Why Not Tonight" by Stafford Dickens, present a four-week tour to include London, Eastbourne, Hastings and Margate.

Aurora Productions aim to present a full winter and summer programme through 1947; a weekly repertory with six performances including a Saturday matinee. By the summer season, the company is supporting a cast of ten players, a full time Producer, and a scenic director; artist Michael Thomason. A summer repertory season has been set up at Gorleston on Sea with a second company.

Post war Great Yarmouth holiday entertainment gets back to full swing with the Aurora Repertory Company contributing to a Midnight Matinee on Wellington Pier as part of the Great Yarmouth Carnival; first since before the start of the war. As part of the Battle of Britain Week festivities, Miss Patricia Hall, a member of the Little Theatre Repertory Company, was elected "Miss Battle of Britain" at the Britannia Pier, Yarmouth.

=== A Firm Footing in Yarmouth Entertainment ===
Into 1948 and Peter Elliston, Director of Aurora Productions, takes a "hands on" approach to his role and makes the first of many appearances on stage at the Little Theatre.

Getting a firm support base is key to success. To raise their profile, a Theatre Club is formed providing a varied programme of Sunday evening activities. Entertainments included dancing displays, debates, lectures and quiz nights.

Mervyn R Pinfield leaves Aurora Productions as theatre producer after a "long and happy relationship", taking a position as producer at the Royalty Theatre, Morecambe. Weston Perceval succeeds as producer for Aurora Productions. During his past career, he stage directed the Anglo-Russian Ballet and the Ballet Guild companies, was producer for Wimbledon Repertory Players, and stage director for the first production of Michael Clayton Hutton's "Power Without Glory".

A service was held at St James's Church, Yarmouth, under the auspices of the Actor's Church Union, attended by a congregation from all sides of the Yarmouth entertainment world. The church organ was accompanied by the Wellington Pier Pavilion's "Showtime" orchestra. The lessons were read by comedian Ted Gatty and Director Peter Elliston.

Aurora Productions present a new comedy play by A P Dearsley entitled "Two's Company". The play was well received and the author gave tribute to the repertory company as "one among the top" he had seen.

The Little Theatre acquires a new producer; Guy Vaesen. Guy Vaesen comes from the Birmingham Repertory Theatre, just having finished a modern dress production of "The Merchant of Venice" for Accrington Arts Theatre. His "The Lady and the Pedlar" ran right through the 1948 Edinburgh Festival. Mr Vaesen started producing in 1935. He graduated from the Westminster Theatre School and played with Flora Robson and Henry Ainley in "The Anatomist".

Guy Vaesen presents "Time and the Conways"; J B Priestley's play based on the theory that past and future are one. Patricia Parry, who played in the Forbes-Robertson version and acted in Mr Vaesen's production for the Edinburgh Festival last year, was guest artist, playing the lead. Phyllis Cardew, the wife of Mr Bryan Meredith, manager of the Britannia Pier, plays Mrs Conway.

The Little Theatre presents a new play by A P Dearsley entitled "The Lark Sings". The play is in a serious vein and has for its theme the mental conflict of a maimed and blinded war casualty, Captain Harry Langton. Peter Elliston played the role of Harry Langton and guest artist, Martin Bradley, plays his father Sir Thomas Langton. The play was produced by Paulina Brandt.

Guy Vaesen moves on and Roger V B Milton presents his first play as producer with A P Dearsley's "Fly Away Peter". Mr Milton used to produce for the Twyford House Drama Group, Bristol.

=== Repertory Theatre Running at a Loss ===
By the end of the summer season, 1949, problems plague the Little Theatre and the neighbouring Lowestoft Repertory Company where the necessary aggregate attendance figure for a successful week would be 2000 from a population of 45,000. Director Mr Peter Elliston said he would be "...more than happy if an audience of 1000 a week were possible out of Yarmouth's 52,000. just over 100 a performance". Sparse audiences in the winter contribute barely half the 100.

1950 and Aurora Productions and a local amateur company, "The Masquers", join forces to present "Saint Joan" by George Bernard Shaw. The company, who have had an uphill battle to make the Yarmouth public theatre conscious, decided on this ambitious venture to attract more support. With only nine players in the Aurora company, the 34 characters with 24 speaking parts presented some difficulty, hence the collaborative venture. The part of Joan is taken by 22 year old Sybil Ewbank, niece of Dame Sybil Thorndike. Miss Ewbank will use the sword that Dame Sybil used in the first production of the play. The costumes, in the Masquers' tradition, were made by their producer, Mrs Linet Crawshaw.

Romilly Cavan's play "I'll See You Again" will be the last produced by Roger V B Milton. Peter Elliston, manager, will step in until such time as a replacement can be found.

John French of the Lowestoft Repertory Company assumed the role as Producer to be next succeeded by Vivienne Wood. Vivienne Wood, again of the Lowestoft Repertory Company, opens with "The Happiest Days of Your Life" by John Dighton. Both Vivienne Wood and her husband, Alan Broadhurst, were in the film of the play.

"The Lady Purrs", a comparatively new play by Ted Willis, is the subject of a BBC broadcast recorded at the Little Theatre. Members of the company have produced a condensed script with some further cuts for mixing in narrative and sound effects. Mr W Hughes is the producer for the BBC.

=== A Collaborative Venture with the New Lowestoft Playhouse ===
The Aurora Repertory Company are presenting a three-week "season" of plays at the Lowestoft Playhouse, starting with Ronald Pertwee's comedy "The School for Spinsters". This will be Richard Leven's first play as producer for Aurora Productions. Peter Elliston has intimated that an "East Anglian Repertory Company" has now been formed, to present plays both at the Playhouse and the Little Theatre under his management with Richard Leven as producer.

Mr F C Symonds, owner of the Lowestoft Playhouse, said that the players now at Yarmouth and Lowestoft will be combined in the new company, appearing in each town on the basis of a "fortnightly repertory". Each play will be presented for two weeks; one week in Yarmouth, the other in Lowestoft. It is hoped that this will reduce costs considerably, and will have the added advantage of each cast learning one script a fortnight rather than every week.

The East Anglian Repertory Company present two new plays. The first by Bridget Chetwynde and John Davenport entitled "Atlanta", a "conflict" drama with a strong psychological angle, and a Christmas comedy by Alan Broadhurst entitled "Let Nothing You Dismay".

=== Threat of Closure ===
Following the final curtain of the play "Let Nothing You Dismay", Mr Elliston announced that unless audiences increased significantly in the interim, the theatre would have to close before Christmas. Not unexpectedly, at the start of the following week's production, a statement by Mr Peter Elliston announcing the Little Theatre was to close in two weeks time, was read out by one of the cast, John Franklyn-Robbins.

The Little Theatre company made their farewell on a note which was far less sombre than the occasion. After the final curtain of Hal D Stewart's comedy, "Beannachy Bomb", Ruth Kettlewell, a long time member of the company, spoke of the "great pleasure" she and the other members of the cast had had playing at the theatre and working with Peter Elliston. In his curtain speech, Mr Elliston referred to the closure as a personal sorrow and thanked both players and supporters for their loyalty and kindness. "We have always appreciated" he said "all that has been done for us". Mr Rye, chairman of the Little Theatre Club committee, expressed his appreciation of Mr Elliston's efforts.

"The Stage" announces the closure of the Aurora Repertory at the Little Theatre after a four-year struggle. "Peter Elliston, the managing director, must receive a special tribute for the great personal sacrifices he has made in the cause of repertory". Special note was made of the high standard of work from the scenic designer Michael Thomason, and Ruth Kettlewell as an excellent character actress.

=== Final year at Yarmouth ===
By arrangement with Mr Peter Elliston, the newly formed "Great Yarmouth Repertory" carries on at the Little Theatre, Aurora Productions holding the lease to the end of 1951.

== Principal artists ==
First Appearance	Last Appearance	Cast	Productions	First Appearance	Last Appearance	Cast	Productions
30/09/1946	12/04/1948	Frank Pemberton	16	02/05/1949	19/12/1949	Dennis Staveley	27
30/09/1946	03/01/1949	Velvey Attwood	13	09/05/1949	12/12/1949	Christopher Jermyn	26
30/12/1946	28/03/1949	Evelyn Phillips	23	25/07/1949	30/10/1950	Donald Adams	52
30/06/1947	25/04/1949	Richard O'Donoghue	20	25/07/1949	12/12/1949	Ivor Earle	18
02/02/1948	20/11/1950	Peter Elliston	43	25/07/1949	19/12/1949	Edna Milson	16
02/02/1948	20/11/1950	Robert Handley	16	01/08/1949	26/12/1949	Lisbeth Knight	19
12/04/1948	04/12/1950	Ruth Kettlewell	79	29/08/1949	26/12/1949	Joseph Shaw	16
10/05/1948	11/07/1949	Noel Lloyd	15	19/12/1949	25/09/1950	Margaret Grainger	18
13/09/1948	18/07/1949	Esmee Harrison	21	26/12/1949	04/12/1950	Diana Shaw	41
21/03/1949	11/07/1949	Alan Miller	14	09/01/1950	04/12/1950	John Franklyn-Robbins	42
28/03/1949	18/07/1949	Eileen Kennally	12	20/02/1950	27/11/1950	Desmond O'Callen	29
11/04/1949	04/12/1950	Maureen O'Leary	34	05/06/1950	18/09/1950	Joan Winmill	12
18/04/1949	30/10/1950	Phyllis Cardew	19	24/07/1950	13/11/1950	Gabrielle Hamilton	15

== Stage managers ==
In repertory theatre the stage manager has a somewhat ambiguous role, for by necessity the position required acting ability. Conversely, at times, the role had to be filled from the cast of actors. Over the years, The Little Theatre could boast of a succession of professional stage managers; Robert Handley, Peter Drew, Julian Gaunt, George Knight and Desmond O'Callen among them.

== The Little Theatre ==
The Little Theatre was originally the Minor Hall Ballroom of the Royal Aquarium, Great Yarmouth. In 1934, through the initiative of Mr Cliff Diamond, then manager of the Aquarium, a stage was built with a fit-up proscenium. Summer seasons of repertory were staged by George A de Gray in 1935 and 1936, John Lee Hunt in 1937 and 1938, and the Forbes Russell Brighton Repertory in 1939. Over the war years, there was no further professional activity until R W Schofield took on the lease, opening with the Westminster Players in May 1946. Subsequently, Mr Schofield presented the County Players and then the Aurora Players until his untimely death in 1946.

== Director Peter Elliston ==
Of Canadian birth, Peter Elliston's parents, both died before his third birthday leaving he and his sister Joan to be brought up by their grandparents. As a result, his first childhood years were spent between his maternal grandparents in Canada in the summer (his grandmother, Edith Archibald, was a prominent suffragist), and in the winter at the home of his grandmother Ellen Longstaff, second wife of Dr William Alfred Elliston MD, in Felixstowe. His time at St Catharine's College, Cambridge, gave opportunity to develop a love of performance with the university "Mummers". After a time in Hollywood at the MGM Drama School, he attended the then named Central School of Speech Training and Dramatic Art in London. An actor's life on the London stage was interrupted by the war, serving for six years with the RASC, which at its end saw the beginning of Aurora Productions.

== "A Play at the Seaside" ==
The radio recording "A Play at the Seaside", a BBC Radio Norfolk programme produced and presented by Tony Mallion, features actors Ruth Kettlewell, Donald Adams and John Hunt recalling their times at the Little Theatre during the period into the 1950s.

== Sources ==
=== Notes ===
Where source material is accessible on-line, mainly news articles, the specific reference has been given. Other inclusion in this page has been sourced from archive material collected by Aurora Productions Limited which has yet to be catalogued. The archive holds other material including stage photographs, a comprehensive photographic collection of stage scenery (Michael Thomason, Scenic Director), and an extensive collection of theatre programmes covering productions over the years 1946 to 1950. As much as possible, media has been included to accompany the BBC Broadcast in the YouTube video, "A Play at the Seaside".
