= Denys Blakelock =

English actor, teacher, writer and broadcaster (1901–1970)

- Born: June 22, 1901; London
- Died: December 7, 1970; London
- Occupation: actor

Denys Blakelock (22 June 1901 – 9 December 1970) was an English actor, teacher, writer and broadcaster.

== Life and career ==
Blakelock was born in London on 22 June 1901, son of the Rev Martin Blakelock, vicar of St Andrew's, Muswell Hill, and his wife, Constance, née Pike. He was educated at Aldenham School from where he went on to the Royal Academy of Dramatic Art (RADA). In 1920 he made his first professional appearance, as Jaising in Rabindranath Tagore's play Sacrifice. According to The Times it was in "the showy part of an effeminate soclalite" in Basil Dean's production of Frederick Lonsdale's Spring Cleaning (1925) that Blakelock made his name.

In the late 1920s and throughout the 1930s Blakelock appeared in a succession of West End plays, many of them successful but undemanding. Feeling the need of a greater challenge he turned to the classics, appearing at the Arts Theatre from 1942 to 1945, playing, among other roles, Aguecheek in Twelfth Night, Androcles in Androcles and the Lion, Bob Acres in The Rivals, and the title role in The Magistrate. In 1951 he featured in the original West End cast of John Whiting's A Penny for a Song.

Despite his continuing success as an actor Blakelock grew disenchanted with the theatre, and in 1954 he abandoned the part of Firs, the old major domo, during rehearsals of John Gielgud's production of The Cherry Orchard. After that he worked extensively on television and radio, taught at RADA, and wrote a biography of Eleanor Farjeon titled Eleanor: Portrait of a Farjeon, essays, and an autobiography. His autobiography, titled Round the Next Corner was published in 1967 by Victor Gollancz in London. With a Foreword by Paul Scofield, it was reviewed as "An intensely personal autobiography that also throws much light on London theatrical life in the twenties and thirties." His book of poetry "The Waters", which focused on his Catholic faith, was published by the Assisi Press in Dublin in 1955. He dedicated the book to Eleanor Farjeon (who encouraged him to write poetry), and was instrumental in her conversion to Catholicism in her late adulthood. His acting work for the BBC in his later years included the main role in the radio adaptation of LP Hartley's novel The Go-Between, broadcast on 2 January 1961, and a long-running role in the television series Waggoners' Walk.

Blakelock died in London on 9 December 1970, aged 69. In its obituary The Times commented, "It seems sad that a man whose acting, especially in comedy, gave so much pleasure should himself have found so little satisfaction in it. At least, however, he enjoyed passing on his knowledge and his experience of the problems of the stage to student classes at RADA. and to pupils who worked with him privately".

== References and sources ==
=== Sources ===
- Gaye, Freda, ed. (1967). Who's Who in the Theatre (fourteenth ed.). London: Sir Isaac Pitman and Sons. OCLC 5997224.
