= Mary Chandler (composer) =

English composer (1911–1996)

Kathleen Mary Chandler (16 May 1911 – 19 November 1996) was an English composer, oboist, pianist and teacher. Born in Eltham, South London, she studied music privately and at the Blackheath Conservatoire from August 1928, with Harry Farjeon (composition) and Harold Craxton (piano). In 1930 she began studying English at Somerville College, Oxford. She started teaching English at the Channing School in Highgate, London from 1934, moving to the Blackheath High School four years later. During the war she and her pupils at Blackheath were evacuated out of London to the Tunbridge Wells High School.

Chandler maintained her interest in music, joining the Society of Women Musicians in 1935 and having her music first performed in public the following year. She took up the oboe from scratch in 1940, when her teachers were Margaret Eliot and Léon Goossens. She joined the Tunbridge Wells Symphony Orchestra on oboe as an amateur in 1942. In 1944, invited by George Weldon, she was appointed principal oboist of the City of Birmingham Symphony Orchestra (where she was a colleague in the oboe section with Ruth Gipps), and gave many recitals and broadcasts in the Midlands area. In May 1956 the CBSO gave the first performance and broadcast of her Concerto for Oboe d'amore with Léon Goossens as the soloist. There were two further public performances later that year. The orchestra also performed her 1956 Trumpet Concerto, with soloist Bram Gay. After leaving the CBSO in 1958 she formed the Mercian Trio (flute, oboe and piano), which toured the country.

In 1960 she was appointed Area Director of the Kent Music School (now Kent Music), where she focused on wind teaching. She also taught at the Tonbridge Music Centre. Her address during the 1960s was 1 Park Cottage, Great Comp. Retiring in 1971, she moved to the village of Bisley in Gloucestershire, from where she continued composing, organizing concerts, examining for ABRSM, and performing (on spinet) with the Cotswold Baroque Trio. Ian Partridge sang her Three Elizabethan Lyrics at the Aldeburgh Festival on 20 June 1980 and then commissioned and broadcast her 1983 song cycle A Time of Waiting, setting poetry by Jennifer Andrews.

Chandler died at a nursing home in Stroud, aged 85. Her music has been published by Clifton Edition, Nova Music, Novello and Phylloscopus Publications.

== Selected works ==
- English Suite in E minor for piano (1935)
- Violin Sonata in B minor (1935)
- Fantasy String Quartet (1937)
- Trio for oboe, cor anglais and piano (1938)
- Concertante for oboe and string quartet (1947)
- Bagatelle for oboe and piano (1950)
- Concerto for oboe d'amore and strings (1953, for Léon Goossens)
- String Quartet in A minor (1954)
- Petite Suite for two pianos (1955)
- Sinfonietta for brass sextet (1955, for CBSO Brass Ensemble)
- Sonatina for cor anglais and piano (1955, for Dinah Demuth)
- Divertimento for woodwind trio (1956)
- Traveller’s Joy for oboe and piano (1956)
- Trumpet Concerto, with strings and percussion (1956)
- Concerto for viola d'amore and strings (1958)
- Cassation for wind octet (1960)
- Holiday Tunes for oboe and piano (pub. 1961)
- Sonatina for oboe and piano (1967, for Dinah Demuth)
- Trio for oboe, clarinet and horn (1967, winner of the W. W. Cobbett Prize for Women Composers)
- Celebration Suite (1970)
- Three Elizabethan Lyrics (1970)
- Recollections, song cycle for soprano, harp, violin, viola, and cello (1970, fp. 1976)
- A Suite of Variants for piano (1977)
- Masquerade for woodwind quintet (1978)
- The Threshold of the New, song cycle (1979)
- Pas de Quatre for woodwind quartet (1980, for Painswick Music Society)
- Concerto for Strings (1983)
- A Time of Waiting, song cycle (1983)
- Sonatina for clarinet and piano (1983, for Christopher Crake, fp. Stroud Festival, 1988)
- Things to Do: Six Short Piano Pieces (1987)
- Three Dance Studies for oboe and piano (pub. 1987)
- Occasional Suite for orchestra (1988)
- Trio for two oboes and cor anglais (fp. Three Choirs Festival, 1989)
- Summer’s Lease, oboe solo (pub. 1992)
- Sonatina for piano duet (1995)
