= A Penny for a Song =

1951 play

- Written by: John Whiting
- Original language: English
- Genre: Historical comedy
- Setting: A country house, Dorset, 1804

Premiere
- Date premiered: 12 February 1951
- Place premiered: Wimbledon Theatre, London

A Penny for a Song is a 1951 historical comedy play by the British writer John Whiting. In 1967 it was adapted into an opera of the same title by Richard Rodney Bennett, performed at Sadler's Wells.

It premiered at Wimbledon Theatre before transferring to the Haymarket Theatre in London's West End where it ran for 35 performances between 1 and 31 March 1951. The original cast included Virginia McKenna, Ronald Squire, Ronald Howard, Basil Radford, George Rose, Alan Webb, Denis Cannan, Denys Blakelock and Marie Lohr. It was directed by Peter Brook. The production marked McKenna's West End debut. It has been revived on a number of occasions, notably in a Royal Shakespeare Company production starring Marius Goring and Judi Dench in 1962 staged at the Aldwych Theatre, London.

== Synopsis ==
In 1804 with Britain facing with an imminent French invasion, a Dorset country gentleman hatches a plan to thwart the enemy by impersonating Napoleon.
