= After Dark (Farjeon play) =

1926 British play

- Written by: Joseph Jefferson Farjeon
- Original language: English
- Genre: Thriller

Premiere
- Date premiered: 6 September 1926
- Place premiered: Pier Theatre, Eastbourne

After Dark is a thriller play by the British writer Joseph Jefferson Farjeon.

After premiering at the Pier Theatre in Eastbourne it transferred to the West End for a run of 56 performance, initially at the Garrick Theatre before moving to the Comedy Theatre. The original cast included Horace Hodges, Donald Calthrop and Malcolm Keen.

== Adaptation ==
In 1932 it was adapted into the British film After Dark directed by Albert Parker and made at Walton Studios by the British subsidiary of Fox Film.

== Bibliography ==
- Goble, Alan. The Complete Index to Literary Sources in Film. Walter de Gruyter, 1999.
- Wearing, J. P. The London Stage 1920-1929: A Calendar of Productions, Performers, and Personnel. Rowman & Littlefield, 2014.
