= Susan Beatrice Pearse =

British illustrator (1878–1980)

Susan Beatrice Pearce
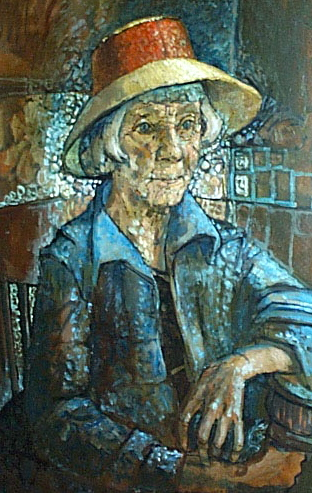
- The illustrator of the Ameliaranne books
- Born: 19 January 1878; Kennington, London, England
- Died: 2 January 1980 (aged 101); Parsons Green, London, England
- Occupation: Illustrator
- Writing career
- Period: 20th century
- Genre: Children's Literature

(Susan) Beatrice Pearse (19 January 1878 – 1980) was a British illustrator of children's books best known for the Ameliaranne series of books.

== Life ==
She was born in Kennington in South London and educated at King Edward's School, Southwark. She married fellow artist Walter Ernest Webster in Fulham towards the end of 1919, but continued to use her maiden name professionally. To her friends, she was known as 'Trissy' Webster. She is best known for her work on the Ameliaranne series of children's books. She also created drawings for greeting cards and often included pictures of dolls in her work. Susan B Pearce Webster lived her later years in the village of Blewbury, Berkshire, about 50 miles west of London, a village popular with authors and artists including John Revel, Kenneth Grahame and Marguerite Steen. She died at home at 25 Broomhouse Road, near Parsons Green, London on 2 January 1980, just a few weeks short of her 102nd birthday.

== Ameliaranne books ==
This series of 20 children's books was published between 1920 and 1950 by George G. Harrap of London. It was unusual as it involved eight different individual authors working with a single illustrator. Ameliaranne Stiggins was the oldest daughter of a poor washerwoman, Mrs Stiggins who also had five other children. There is no mention in the Ameliaranne cannon of a "Mr Stiggins". The stories are simple tales of a young girl faced with a new or difficult situation that requires her to use some imagination and ingenuity to resolve. The books are remarkably consistent, given their different (all female) authors, but their real strength and the source of their lasting appeal are the charming illustrations by Susan B Pearce. The text is quite limited in the books and the narrative is largely carried by the very effective and expressive illustrations.

The following Ameliaranne books were all published by George G. Harrap, London. Most were reprinted, some with alternative titles.

- Ameliaranne and the Green Umbrella by Constance Heward (1920)
- Ameliaranne keeps Shop by Constance Heward (1928)
- Ameliaranne, Cinema Star by Constance Heward (1929)
- Ameliaranne in Town by Natalie Joan (1930)
- Ameliaranne at the Circus by Margaret Gilmour (1931)
- Ameliaranne and the big Treasure by Natalie Joan (1932)
- Ameliaranne's Prize Package by Eleanor Farjeon (1933)
- Ameliaranne's Washing Day by Eleanor Farjeon (1934)
- Ameliaranne at the Seaside by Margaret Gilmour (1935)
- Ameliaranne at the Zoo by K.L. Thompson (1936)
- Ameliaranne at the Farm by Constance Heward (1937)
- Ameliaranne gives a Christmas Party by Constance Heward (1938)
- Ameliaranne Camps Out by Constance Heward (1939)
- Ameliaranne keeps School by Constance Heward (1940)
- Ameliaranne Goes Touring by Constance Heward (1941)
- Ameliaranne and the Jumble Sale by Eileen Osborne (1943)
- Ameliaranne gives a Concert by Margaret Gilmour (1944)
- Ameliaranne Bridesmaid by Ethelberta Morris (1946)
- Ameliaranne goes Digging by Lorna Wood (1948)
- Ameliaranne's Moving Day by Ethelberta Morris (1950)

In 1966, several of the stories were presented on the BBC children's TV program 'Jackanory', read by the British actress Sheila Hancock.

== Other Illustrated books ==
- The Magic Fishbone: A Holiday Romance From the Pen of Miss Alice Rainbird, Aged 7, by Charles Dickens
- The Trial of William Tinkling, Written by Himself at the Age of 8 Years, by Charles Dickens
- The Twins and Tabiffa: Constance Heward
- The Ice Maiden, by Hans Christian Andersen. (Stories for the children.) With eight pictures in colour by SB Pearse c.1905 edition, Ward, Lock & Co, London; the Platt & Peck Co, New York. Printer: Butler & Tanner, the Selwood Printing Works, Frome & London
