= The Z Murders =

1932 novel

- First edition (US)
- Author: Joseph Jefferson Farjeon
- Language: English
- Genre: Mystery crime
- Publisher: Collins Crime Club (UK); The Dial Press (US)
- Publication date: 1932
- Publication place: United Kingdom
- Media type: Print

The Z Murders is a 1932 mystery crime novel by the British writer Joseph Jefferson Farjeon. It was originally published by Collins Crime Club, and in 2015 was reissued by the British Library Publishing as part of a group of republished crime novels from the Golden Age of Detective Fiction.

== Synopsis ==
Richard Temperley arrives on a train at Euston Station amidst a heavy fog and takes shelter at a nearby hotel. An annoying fellow passenger is soon afterwards found shot dead, and Temperley believes it may have something to do with an attractive woman he has just glimpsed. The investigating Scotland Yard officers discover a small metal Z, possibly a piece of jewellery, that may have belonged to the attacker. Temperley meanwhile sets off in pursuit of the mystery woman.

== Bibliography ==
- Hubble, Nick Seaber, Luke & Taylor, Elinor. The 1930s: A Decade of Modern British Fiction. Bloomsbury Publishing, 2021.
- Hubin, Allen J. Crime Fiction, 1749-1980: A Comprehensive Bibliography. Garland Publishing, 1984.
- Reilly, John M. Twentieth Century Crime & Mystery Writers. Springer, 2015.
