= Walter Ernest Webster =

British painter

- Born: 17 November 1877; Manchester, England
- Died: 30 April 1959 (aged 81); London, England
- Occupations: Figure and Portrait Painter and illustrator
- Years active: 1900–1959
- Known for: Figure and portrait paintings of young women
- Notable work: Sonata, c.1935, at the McLean Museum and Art Gallery

Walter Ernest Webster RI ROI RP (17 November 1877 – 30 April 1959) was a British figure and portrait painter. He also worked as an illustrator.

== Biography ==
Webster was born on 17 November 1877 (Note: His entry in the 1939 Register gives this as his date of birth, but his baptismal record states that he was born on 13 November 1877.) His parents were Robert Walter Waithman Webster (born c. 1853), a salesman, and Mary Lowe (born c. 1856), the daughter of bookkeeper Edwin Lowe. He was baptised in Manchester Church of England Cathedral on 10 January 1878. He and his sister Gertrude Mary were the only children of the marriage.

Webster won a scholarship to study at the National Art Training Schools (which was renamed the Royal College of Art) before attending the Royal Academy Schools from 24 January 1899 to 1904. He was a good student and won scholarships and prizes including:

- Before entering the Royal Academy Schools he won the first prize (£2 2s. – two guineas) in a competition in The International Studio for the design of an advertisement.
- A scholarship for painting in 1901.
- First prize (£50 and a silver medal) in a competition for six drawings of a figure from life, also in 1901.
- First prize (£25 and a silver medal) for a cartoon of a draped figure, a Sibyl, in 1902.
- Runner up for the Armitage prize (£10) for a design in monochrome for a figure picture.
- Runner-up for the design of a decoration for a portion of a public building in 1903.

The 1901 census found him living in at 71 Chelverton Road, Putney, London with his mother Mary and his elder sister Gertrude Mary, who was working as a governess (21 March 1876 – 4 October 1970). He was still living with his mother and sister at 71 Chelverton Road in 1911 but had already started working from Studio No.5 at 111, New Kings Road.

He enlisted for service in the British Army on 14 February 1916 and was mobilised on 6 June 1916. He was initially posted to the First (Reserve) Garrison Battalion of the Suffolk Regiment and was later transferred to the 15th Essex regiment. The Royal Engineers camouflage school tested him on 16 September 1918 and classified him as a superior painter. (Note: The classification choices were "indifferent", "fair", "skilled", or "superior.") He was transferred to the Royal Engineers on 28 September 1918 and achieved the rank of acting Sergeant, having already been promoted to acting Lance Corporal on 16 August 1916. He was demobilised on 18 February 1919, having spent the entire war in England.

He married Susan Beatrice Pearse (19 January 1878 – 2 January 1980), an artist and book illustrator, at Fulham in the last quarter of 1919. Susan continued to use her maiden name professionally. (Note: She provided illustrations for Christabel Jane and Chirpy by Constance Heward in 1955, when she was 77 years of age.) The electoral register shows him still living at 71 Chelverton Road in 1919, but by 1920, after his marriage, it shows him living with his wife, mother, and sister at Broome Villa, 27 Broomhouse Road, near Parsons Green. He was still living there when he died on 30 April 1959. His estate was valued at £6,158 17s 9d, with his widow Susan and his sister Gertrude as joint executors. His wife survived him by more than twenty years, dying at the 25 Broomhouse Road, next door to the former family home, on 3 January 1980, just 17 days before her 102nd birthday. Her estate was valued at £95,538.

== Painting and illustrating ==
Having once attended the Royal Academy Schools, Webster started exhibiting works at the Royal Academy, and continued to exhibit there almost every year until his death in May 1959. He also exhibited at the Royal Institute of Oil Painters, Royal Institute of Painters in Water Colours, Royal Glasgow Institute and the Paris Salon. (Note: Webster exhibited in the UK as follows: two works at the Royal Birmingham Society of Artists, 11 works at the Grosvenor Gallery, 36 works at the Walker Art Gallery, Liverpool, one work at the Manchester City Art Gallery, 15 works at the Royal Society of Portrait Painters, 43 works at the Royal Academy, one work at the Royal Cambrian Academy, 70 works at the Royal Institute of Painters in Water Colours, and 55 works at the Royal Institute of Oil Painters.) He was awarded a bronze medal at the Paris Salon in 1912, and won silver medals there in 1913 and 1914, and a gold medal in 1931.

Even while a student, Webster began to work for magazines, building up a fair practice. He produced illustrations for the front covers of several publications including "Ladies' Home Journal" and "Etude". Many of these reflected the Art Deco style of the period. He also produced illustrations for books, including: eight colour plates for "Champion" by John Colin Dane (1907); four colour plates for "King of the Air: or, To Morocco on an Aeroplane" (1907) by Herbert Strang; four colour plates for "For Treasure Bound" by Harry Collingwood (1910). He was elected a member of both the Royal Institute of Painters in Water Colours (RI) and the Royal Institute of Oil Painters (ROI) in 1920 and of the Royal Society of Portrait Painters (RP) in 1921. In 1937 he was elected vice-president of the Royal Society of Portrait Painters. (Note: Who Was Who states that he was the Vice President of the Royal Institute of Painters in Water Colours, but does not give the year of his election.)

His obituary in The Times states that he was deeply influenced by Boucher and Chardin and that many of his pieces have an eighteenth-century flavour.

== Works ==
Webster produced a large body of work. He specialised in painting portraits of young women in a soft, fluid style. An image search for his name yielded over sixty unique images on Google. Artnet currently lists 161 auctions (including some pieces which have been sold numerous times) of works by Webster since 1995. ) Since 1998 the highest price paid for a work by Webster was US$62,935 for "The Japanese Fan", sold at Christie's London in 2004. (Note: Benezit gives the auction price as 28,000 GBP for the auction of this is 76x63 cm oil on canvas in London on 24 November 2004, but the Mutual-art dollar price probably included the buyer's premium. Benezit also records Souvenir of Schumann's Carnaval (oil on canvas, 76x61 cm selling for 38,000 GBP in London on 26 June 2001.)

Webster's work can be seen in many public collections in the UK including The Walker Art Gallery, Gallery Oldham, Paisley Museum and Art Galleries, McLean Museum and Art Gallery, Wellcome Collection, and the Government Art Collection. The last of these holds Webster's portrait of Queen Elizabeth II. Webster had earlier painted a water colour of the young Princess Elizabeth.
