= Annabel Farjeon =

British ballerina (1919–2004)

- Born: Eve Annabel Farjeon; March 19, 1919; Bucklebury, Berkshire, England
- Died: 8 February 2004 (aged 84)
- Other name: Sarah Jefferson
- Occupations: Ballerina and author
- Parent(s): Herbert Farjeon and Joan Farjeon

Eve Annabel Farjeon (19 March 1919 – 8 February 2004) was a British ballerina and author.

She was born on 19 March 1919 at Spring Cottage in Bucklebury, Berkshire, the daughter of the critic Herbert Farjeon and the artist Joan Farjeon (1888-1989) from the Thornycroft family. Her younger brother (by 19 months) was the theatre producer and designer Gervase Farjeon. She began learning ballet aged eleven, made her professional debut at the age of 14 (in the roles of Snowflake and Biscuit in the original (1934) Vic-Wells Ballet London production of Casse Noisette), and went on to dance with the Vic-Wells, later Sadler's Wells Ballet in the 1930s, where she worked with choreographers Ninette de Valois and Frederick Ashton.

Annabel Farjeon was with the Sadler's Wells company during the war years, including its tour to The Hague in May 1940 and subsequent evacuation from The Hotel du Passage in the face of Germany's invasion of Holland on 10 May. She kept detailed diaries and subsequently published an account of the events in Dance Chronicle.

As an author, Farjeon published an early novel (The Alphabet, 1943) about "the childhood and adolescence of a remarkably self-engrossed young woman". She was also a ballet critic for the Evening Standard and the New Statesman, and sometimes wrote under the name Sarah Jefferson. In the late 1960s she began publishing fiction for children. She wrote a biography of her paternal aunt Eleanor Farjeon. There is also a biography of the Russian mosiaic artist Boris Anrep (whose son Igor she married), which was never published in English, but was translated into Russian and published in St Petersburg in 2003.

She was married twice: first to Hugh Adams (one child, Olvia, born 1946), and then to Igor Anrep on July 9, 1949 (one child, Benjamin, born 1953, a ceramic artist based in Hitchin).

== Created roles ==
- Checkmate, a Pawn (Ninette de Valois, 1937)
- The Wise Virgins, the Mother (Frederick Ashton, 1940)

== Selected publications ==
- The Alphabet (1943), novel
- Maria Lupin (1967), for children
- The Siege Of Trapp's Mill(1974), for children
- The Unicorn Drum (1976), for children
- The Cock of Round Hill (1977), for children
- The Book of Ballet Stories (1981), plot outlines for children
- Town Cat's Diary (1987), for children
- Le village abandonné (1992)
- The Lucky Ones (1984), for children
- Morning Has Broken: A Biography of Eleanor Farjeon (1986)
- Eleanor Fargeon. Invitation to a Mouse and Other Poems, chosen by Annabel Farjeon (1986)
- 'The Dutch Journal: The Sadler's Wells Ballet in Holland, May 1940', Parts One, Two and Three. Dance Chronicle, Vol. 10, No. 3 (1986), pp. 330–366; Vol. 11, No. 1 (1988), pp. 84-115; and Vol. 11, No. 2 (1988), pp. 274-312
- 'Choreographers: Dancing for de Valois and Ashton', in Dance Chronicle, Vol. 17, No. 2 (1994), pp. 195-206.

== See also ==
Farjeon family
