= Farjeon family =

Family tree of the Farjeon family, England

The Farjeon family was a notable English family of authors, actors, artists and musicians, spanning several generations. Jacob Farjeon (c1800-1865), an Orthodox Jew, was the head of the family, working as a poor second-hand clothes dealer in Whitechapel, London. He was said to be an exceptional lingust and a good tenor singer. He married Dinah Levy of Deal, Kent on 17 October, 1827. There were five children, one of whom was the popular novelist Benjamin Farjeon. Benjamin's five children included Eleanor (poet), Harry (composer) Joseph (crime and mystery writer) and Herbert (playwright). Herbert's children included Annabel (dancer and author) and Gervase (theatre producer).

== Family tree ==
- Jacob Farjeon (c1800-1865), lived in Whitechapel, London, married Dinah Levy in 1827 at Deal in Kent.
  - Israel Farjeon (1831-1897), jewelry merchant, New York, four sons and a daughter.
  - Esther Farjeon, had three children before she was 20 and 15 afterwards.
  - Benjamin Farjeon (1838-1903), writer, emigrated to Australia in 1854, New Zealand 1861, back to the UK, 1868. Married Margaret Jefferson (1853–1933).
    - Harry (1878-1948), composer, music professor.
    - Charles Farjeon (1880-1881).
    - Eleanor Farjeon (1881-1965), author, poet.
    - Joseph Jefferson Farjeon (1883-1955), crime and mystery novelist, playwright and screenwriter, married Frances Wood in 1910.
      - Joan Jefferson Farjeon (1913–2006), theatre set designer.
    - Herbert Farjeon (1887-1945), married Joan Thornycroft, artist (1888-1989).
      - Joscelyn Farjeon (1917-????), scenery and costume designer, married baritone Ernest Frank in 1942. Painted by Mary Potter in 1939.
        - Miriam Frank (born 1943).
      - Annabel Farjeon (1919-2004), ballarina and author, married (1) Hugh Adams and (2) Igor Anrep (1914-2003).
        - Olivia Adams (1) (born 1946).
        - Benjamin Anrep (2) (born 1953), ceramic artist.
      - Gervase Farjeon (1920-2001), theatre producer, director, manager and designer, married actor Violetta a Becket-Williams (1923-2015) in 1949.
  - Morris Farjeon (died in Australia).
  - Solomon Farjeon (lived in California).

== See also ==
Thornycroft family
