= Nicholas Stuart Gray =

British actor and writer

- Born: October 23, 1912; London, England
- Died: March 17, 1981 (aged 68); London, England
- Occupations: Playwright; author; actor

Nicholas Stuart Gray (born 23 October 1912 – 17 March 1981) was a British actor and playwright perhaps best known for his work in children's theatre in England. He was also an author of children's fantasy; he wrote a number of novels, a dozen plays, and many short stories. Gray worked as an actor during the 1930s. He began presenting as male around 1939, and underwent a medical transition in 1959. Neil Gaiman has written that Gray "is one of those authors I loved as a boy who holds up even better on rereading as an adult". Many other modern fantasy authors, such as Cecilia Dart-Thornton, Kate Forsyth, Cassandra Golds, Sophie Masson, and Garth Nix, cite Gray's work as something they enjoyed as children.

Perhaps his best-known books are The Seventh Swan and Grimbold's Other World. Gray often produced adaptations or continuations of traditional fairy tales and fantasy works, as in his Further Adventures of Puss in Boots. His The Stone Cage is a re-telling of Rapunzel from a cat's point of view. Over the Hills to Fabylon is about a city whose king has the ability to make it fly off across the mountains if he feels it is in danger.

Gray maintained a long-term collaborative relationship with set designer and illustrator Joan Jefferson Farjeon, who supplied the costume and scenic designs for many of the theatrical productions of his plays, as well as the illustrations for most of his printed plays and for the novel version of The Seventh Swan.

== Bibliography ==
=== Theatre ===
==== Plays for children ====
- Beauty and the Beast (1951)
- The Princess and the Swineherd (1952)
- The Tinder Box (1954)
- The Hunters and the Henwife (1954)
- The Marvellous Story of Puss in Boots (1955)
- New Clothes for the Emperor (1957)
- The Imperial Nightingale (1957)
- The Other Cinderella (1958)
- The Seventh Swan: A Play (1962)
- The Stone Cage: A Play (1963)
- New Lamps for Old (1968)
- Gawain and the Green Knight (1969)

=== Prose ===
==== Novels for children ====
- Over the Hills to Fabylon (1954)
- Down in the Cellar (1961)
- The Seventh Swan: A Novel (1962)
- Grimbold's Other World (1963)
- The Stone Cage: A Novel (1963)
- The Apple Stone (1965)
- The Further Adventures of Puss in Boots (1971)
- The Wardens of the Weir (1978)
- The Garland of Filigree (1979)

==== Short fiction for children ====
===== Collections =====
- Mainly in Moonlight (1965) (twelve short stories)
- The Edge of Evening (1976) (eight short stories)
- A Wind from Nowhere (1978) (nine short stories)

===== Other short fiction =====
- The Sorcerer's Apprentices (1986) (picture book of a story from Mainly in Moonlight)

==== Novels for adults ====
- Killer's Cookbook (1976)

==== Nonfiction ====
- The Boys: Cats with Everything (1968)

=== Poetry ===
- Facets: Poems and Pictures (1977)
