= Benjamin Farjeon =

English novelist, playwright, and journalist (1838–1903)

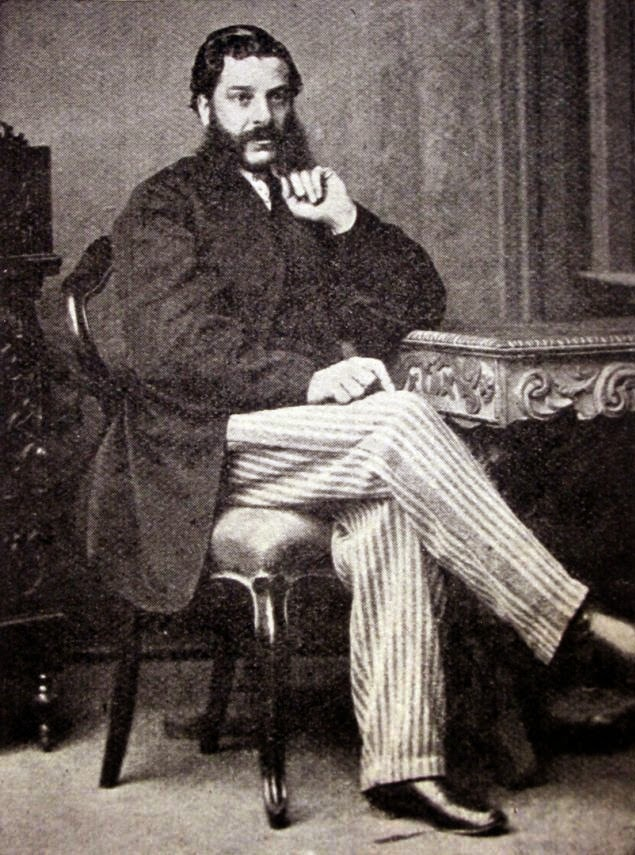
- Born: 12 May 1838; London, United Kingdom
- Died: 23 July 1903 (aged 65); Hampstead, London, United Kingdom
- Spouse: Margaret Jane Jefferson (m. 1877)
- Children: J. Jefferson Farjeon; Eleanor Farjeon; Herbert Farjeon; Harry Farjeon

Benjamin Leopold Farjeon (12 May 1838 – 23 July 1903) was an English novelist, playwright, printer and journalist. As an author, he was known for his huge output.

== Life ==
Farjeon was born in London to Dinah Levy and Jacob Farjeon, Orthodox Jews. He was raised in Whitechapel and had no formal secular education.

At 14, he entered the office of the Nonconformist, a Christian journal, to learn the printing trade. In 1854 he emigrated to Australia. During the voyage he was moved from steerage to cabin class because he had produced some numbers of a ship newspaper, the Ocean Record.

Farjeon worked as a gold miner in Victoria (Australia), started a newspaper, then went to New Zealand in 1861. He settled in Dunedin, working as a journalist on the Otago Daily Times, edited by Julius Vogel, of which he became manager and sub-editor.

Farjeon began writing novels and plays, as a self-confessed disciple of Dickens, whose attention he managed to catch. In his novel Grif: A story of Australian life, for example, he modelled the Melbourne street Arab Grif on Jo in Bleak House. In 1868, he returned to Britain and lived in London in the Adelphi Theatre.

Over the next 35 years, Farjeon produced nearly 60 novels. Many of his works were illustrated by his long-time friend Nicholas Chevalier.

Benjamin Farjeon died in Hampstead on 23 July 1903, aged 65.

== Family ==
Farjeon married Margaret Jane "Maggie" Jefferson (1853–1933), daughter of the American actor Joseph Jefferson, on 6 June 1877. Their children included J. Jefferson Farjeon, Eleanor Farjeon, Herbert Farjeon, and Harry Farjeon.

== Critical assessment ==
Only one substantial piece of scholarship has been dedicated solely to Farjeon; a dissertation by Lillian Faderman. He is included in several standard reference books. Michelle Persell's more recent assessment was that Farjeon was "a novelist of, at best, middling abilities who achieved a modicum of popular success working in the sentimental realist tradition". Philip Hensher's view is that the overpowering influence of Dickens was damaging to Farjeon's work. His later work draws more heavily on the sensational mystery novels popularised by Wilkie Collins. Great Porter Square, a Mystery (1885) and The Mystery of M. Felix (1890) are representative examples.

== Selected novels ==
- Shadows on the Snow: A Christmas Story (1865)
- Grif: a Story of Australian Life (1870)
- Jessie Trim (1870)
- Blade-o'-Grass: A Christmas Story (1871)
- Joshua Marvel (1871)
- London's Heart (1873)
- Bread-and-Cheese and Kisses: A Christmas Story (1873)
- Golden Grain (1874)
- The King of No-Land (1875)
- The Duchess of Rosemary Lane (1876)
- An Island Pearl (1876)
- At the Sign of the Silver Flagon (1880)
- Great Porter Square: A Mystery (1884)
- The House of White Shadows (1884)
- Love's Harvest (1885)
- The Sacred Nugget (1885)
- In a Silver Sea (1886)
- The Nine of Hearts (1886)
- A Secret Inheritance (1887)
- The Tragedy of Featherstone (1887)
- Devlin the Barber (1888)
- Toilers of Babylon (1888)
- The Peril of Richard Pardon (1888)
- Miser Fairbrother (1888)
- The Mystery of M. Felix (1890)
- For the Defense (1891)
- The Blood White Rose (1891)
- The Last Tenant (1893) L'ultimo inquilino, (First Italian Edition) Traduzione e cura di Piero Bocci, Independently published, Amazon, 2026
- Something Occurred (1893)
- Aaron the Jew (1894) (US title: A Fair Jewess)
- Miriam Rozella (1898)
- Samuel Boyd of Catchpole Square: A Mystery (1899)
- The Mesmerists (1900)

== See also ==
Farjeon family
