= Herbert Farjeon =

British revue writer and theatre critic

Herbert (Bertie) Farjeon (5 March 1887 – 3 May 1945) was a major figure in the British theatre from 1910 until his death. He was a presenter of revues in London's West End, a theatre critic, lyricist, librettist, playwright, theatre manager and researcher.

== Early life ==
His father was the novelist Benjamin Leopold Farjeon. His mother, Margaret Jefferson, was the daughter of the American actor, Joseph Jefferson. His sister was Eleanor Farjeon, the writer of children's verse and stories. His brothers were Harry Farjeon, the composer, and J. Jefferson Farjeon, who wrote novels. He was a conscientious objector in the First World War.

== Career ==
His first play to be performed, Friends, was put on at the Abbey Theatre, Dublin in 1917. Subsequently, he had several plays performed in London. He was better known for his revues than for his "straight" plays, however. These included: Spread It Abroad, The Two Bouquets, Nine Sharp, Little Revue, Diversion and Light and Shade. He is credited with discovering Joyce Grenfell, whose first stage appearance was in Light and Shade. In 1938, he joined the management of the Little Theatre in the Adelphi in London, and his revues were performed there. His songs included "I've danced with a man, who's danced with a girl, who's danced with the Prince of Wales".

He wrote reviews of plays and articles about the theatre for a number of British newspapers and magazines, including the Daily Mirror, Vogue, The Listener and the Radio Times. He was interested in the history of the theatre, and wrote about the Elizabethan theatre, Shakespeare and his plays, and edited a seven volume publication of the text of the First Folio. In the 1940s he helped to save the Theatre Royal, Bristol when it was put up for sale and might have ceased to be a theatre.

He collaborated with his sister on a number of books, including Kings and Queens (1932), The Two Bouquets (1938, also staged with music by Ernest Irving), An Elephant in Arcady (1939), and The Glass Slipper (1944).

== Personal life ==
In October 1914 he married Joan Thornycroft (September 1888 – April 1989), daughter of Sir Hamo Thornycroft, sculptor. Joan was, via her aunt Theresa Sassoon née Thornycroft, first cousin to Siegfried Sassoon, war poet (and also a keen cricketer). Their daughter, Eve Annabel Farjeon, was a ballerina and author, and their son Gervase Farjeon was a theatre producer and director. Their eldest daughter Joscelyn (born 1917) was painted by Mary Potter in 1939.

He was a cricket enthusiast, and had a collection of pieces about the game published.

An archive of his correspondence and material relating to his productions is held by the University of Bristol.

Farjeon died in London two months past his 58th birthday.

== Bibliography ==
His books include:

- Advertising April, Or the Girl Who Made the Sunshine Jealous: a Comedy in Three Acts, with Horace Horsnell, Kessinger Publishing, 2007 (first published 1922).
- Dramatic Sequels, with John Hankin, Secker, 1926.
- Works of Shakespeare: the Text of the First Folio With Quarto Variants and a Selection of Modern Readings, 7 vols, editor, Nonesuch Library, 1929.
- Kings and Queens, with Eleanor Farjeon, EP Dutton, 1932.
- Heroes and Heroines, with Eleanor Farjeon, J M Dent & Sons, 1933.
- The Comedies, Histories & Tragedies of William Shakespeare, editor, Limited Editions Club, 1939.
- Herbert Farjeon's Cricket Bag, Macdonald, 1946.

== See also ==
Farjeon family
