= Joseph Jefferson Farjeon =

English novelist and playwright (1883–1955)

- Born: 4 June 1883; Hampstead, London, England
- Died: 6 June 1955 (aged 72); Hove, Sussex, England
- Occupations: Writer, playwright

Joseph Jefferson Farjeon (4 June 1883 – 6 June 1955) was an English crime and mystery novelist, playwright and screenwriter. His father, brother and sister also developed successful careers in the literary world. He is known for his Detective Ben series, starting with Number 17 (1926).

== Family ==
Born in Hampstead, London, Farjeon was the grandson of the American actor Joseph Jefferson, after whom he was named. His parents were Jefferson's daughter Maggie (1853–1935) and Benjamin Farjeon (1838–1903), a Victorian novelist, who was born in Whitechapel to an impoverished immigrant family and travelled widely before returning to England in 1868. Joseph Jefferson Farjeon's brothers were Herbert, a dramatist and scholar, and Harry, who became a composer. His sister Eleanor became a children's author.

He married Frances Antoinette Wood in July 1910, in Hampstead. Their daughter Joan Jefferson Farjeon (1913–2006) was a theatre set designer.

== Career: "creepy skill" ==
Farjeon worked for ten years for Amalgamated Press in London before going freelance, working nine hours a day at his writing desk. One of Farjeon's best known works was a 1925 play, Number 17, which was adapted into several films, including Number Seventeen (1932) directed by Alfred Hitchcock, and joined the UK Penguin Crime series as a novel in 1939. He also wrote the screenplay for Michael Powell's My Friend the King (1932) and provided the story for Bernard Vorhaus's The Ghost Camera (1933).

Farjeon's crime novels were admired by Dorothy L. Sayers, who called him "unsurpassed for creepy skill in mysterious adventures". His obituarist in The Times talked of "ingenious and entertaining plots and characterization," while The New York Times, reviewing an early novel, Master Criminal (1924), states that "Mr. Farjeon displays a great deal of knowledge about story-telling... and multiplies the interest of his plot through a terse, telling style and a rigid compression." The Saturday Review of Literature called Death in the Inkwell (1942) an "amusing, satirical, and frequently hair-raising yarn of an author who got dangerously mixed up with his imaginary characters."

A significant revival of interest in the Golden age of detective fiction followed the 2014 success of The British Library reissue of Mystery in White: A Christmas Crime Story. Two more reissues by Farjeon followed in 2015: Thirteen Guests and The Z Murders. Mystery in White is also one of at least three of his novels to have appeared in Italian, French, Dutch (Het mysterie in de sneeuw – The Mystery in the Snow), German, Portuguese, Spanish, Polish and Russian.

Seven Dead has been reissued by The British Library (September 2017). The novel sees the return of Detective-Inspector Kendall, first heard of, in the words of its central character "in the case of the Thirteen Guests. What I liked about him was that he didn't play the violin, or have a wooden leg or anything of that sort. He just got on with it."

Since 2016, all eight Detective Ben novels have been reissued by HarperCollins from the Collins Crime Club archive as a series titled "Ben the tramp mystery".

== Selected works ==
=== Crime fiction and other works ===
- The Master Criminal (London, Brentano's, 1924)
- The Confusing Friendship (London, Brentano's, 1924)
- Little Things That Happen (London, Methuen, 1925)
- Uninvited Guests (London, Brentano's, 1925)
- At the Green Dragon (London, Harrap, 1926) [US title: The Green Dragon, New York, Dial Press, 1926]
- The Crook's Shadow (London, Harrap, 1927)
- More Little Happenings (London, Methuen, 1928)
- The House of Disappearance (New York, A. L. Burt, 1928). Serialised as The Greystones Mystery, Daily Mirror, 1927
- Underground (New York, A. L. Burt, 1928) [alternative title: Mystery Underground, 1932]
- Shadows by the Sea (London, Harrap, 1928)
- The Appointed Date (London, 1929)
- The 5:18 Mystery (1929)
- The Person Called Z (1929)
- Following Footsteps (1930)
- The Mystery on the Moor (London, Collins, 1930)
- The Z Murders (London, Collins, 1932)
- Trunk Call (London, Collins, 1932) [US title: The Trunk Call Mystery, New York, Dial Press, 1932]
- Sometimes Life's Funny (London, Collins, 1933)
- The Mystery of the Creek (London, Collins, 1933) [US title: The House on the Marsh, New York, Dial Press, 1933]
- Dead Man's Heath (London, Collins, 1933) [US title: The Mystery of Dead Man's Heath, New York, Dodd, Mead & Co., 1934]
- Old Man Mystery (London, Collins, 1933)
- Fancy Dress Ball (London, Collins, 1934) [US title: Death in Fancy Dress, Indianapolis, Bobbs-Merrill Company, 1939]
- The Windmill Mystery (London, Collins, 1934)
- Sinister Inn (London, Collins, 1934)
- The Golden Singer (1935)
- His Lady Secretary (1935)
- Mountain Mystery (1935)
- Holiday Express (London, Collins, 1935)
- The Adventure of Edward (1936)
- Dangerous Beauty (London, Collins, 1936)
- Yellow Devil (1937)
- Holiday at Half Mast (London, Collins, 1937)
- Mystery in White (1937)
- The Compleat Smuggler (1938)
- Dark Lady (1938)
- End of An Author (1938) [US title: Death in the Inkwell, Indianapolis, Bobbs-Merrill Company, 1942]
- Exit John Horton (1939) [US title: Friday the 13th, Indianapolis, Bobbs-Merrill Company, 1940]
- Facing Death: Tales Told on a Sinking Raft (1940)
- Aunt Sunday Sees It Through (1940) [US title: Aunt Sunday Takes Command, Indianapolis, Bobbs-Merrill Company, 1940]
- Room Number 6 (1941)
- The Third Victim (1941)
- The Judge Sums Up (1942)
- The House of Shadows (1943)
- Greenmask (1944)
- Black Castle (1944)
- Rona Runs Away (1945)
- The Oval Table (1946)
- Peril in the Pyrenees (1946)
- The Works of Smith Minor (1947)
- Back To Victoria (1947)
- Benelogues (1948)
- The Llewellyn Jewel Mystery (1948)
- Death of a World (1948)
- The Adventure at Eighty (1948)
- Prelude To Crime (1948)
- The Lone House Mystery (1949)
- The Impossible Guest (1949)
- The Shadow of Thirteen (1949)
- The Disappearances of Uncle David (1949)
- Change With Me (1950)
- Mother Goes Gay (1950)
- Cause Unknown (1950)
- Mystery on Wheels (1951)
- The House Over the Tunnel (1951)
- Adventure For Nine (1951)
- The Double Crime (1953)
- The Mystery of the Map (1953)
- Money Walks (1953)
- Castle of Fear (1954)
- Bob Hits the Headlines (1954)
- The Caravan Adventure (1955)

=== Detective Ben series ===
- No. 17 (London, Hodder and Stoughton, 1926)
- The House Opposite (London, Collins, 1931)
- Murderer's Trail (London, Collins, 1931) [US title: Phantom Fingers; New York, Dial Press, 1931]
- Ben Sees It Through (London, Collins, 1932)
- Little God Ben (London, Collins, 1935)
- Detective Ben (London, Collins, 1936)
- Ben on the Job (London, Collins, 1952)
- Number Nineteen (London, Collins, 1952)

=== Inspector Kendall series ===
- Thirteen Guests (London, Collins, 1936)
- Seven Dead (1939)

=== Under the pseudonym Anthony Swift ===
- Murder at a Police Station (London, Hale, 1943)
- November the Ninth at Kersea (London, Hale, 1944)
- Interrupted Honeymoon (London, Hale, 1945)

=== The Detective X. Crook series ===
J.J. Farjeon's fictional character Detective X. Crook appeared from 1925 to 1929 in 57 issues of Flynn's Weekly Detective Fiction.

- Red Eye (20 June 1925)
- The Bilton Safe (27 June 1925)
- The Way to Death (4 July 1925)
- Thomas Doubts No Longer (11 July 1925)
- Fisherman's Luck (18 July 1925)
- Where the Treasure Is (1 August 1925)
- The Hidden Death (8 August 1925)
- Nine Hours to Live (22 August 1925)
- Elsie Cuts Both Ways (29 August 1925)
- Crook's Code (19 December 1925)
- Percy the Pickpocket (26 December 1925)
- A Race for Life (2 January 1926)
- Seeing's Believing (9 January 1926)
- The Deserted Inn (23 January 1926)
- Death's Grim Symbol (6 February 1926)
- Crook Goes Back to Prison (10 April 1926)
- Who Killed James Fyne (17 April 1926)
- Caleb Comes Back (24 April 1926)
- The Vanished Gift (1 May 1926)
- The Death That Beckoned (15 May 1926)
- Footprints in the Snow (17 July 1926)
- The Shadow (24 July 1926)
- Cats Are Evil (14 August 1926)
- The Silent House (28 August 1926)
- The Kleptomaniac (18 September 1926)
- The Knife (23 October 1926)
- The Hotel Hold-up (20 November 1926)
- The Silent Client (27 November 1926)
- Darkness (11 December 1926)
- It Pays To Be Honest (18 December 1926)
- Kidnaped (25 December 1926)
- Whose Hand? (8 January 1927)
- The Datchett Diamond (29 January 1927)
- Vanishing Gems (5 February 1927)
- The Murder Club (26 February 1927)
- LQ585 (5 March 1927)
- The Stolen Hand Bag (19 March 1927)
- Prescription 93b (26 March 1927)
- The Thing in the Room (7 May 1927)
- In the Diamond Line (28 May 1927)
- The New Baronet (4 June 1927)
- The Fourth Attempt (9 July 1927)
- The Absconding Treasurer (23 July 1927)
- The Man Who Forgot (3 September 1927)
- No Motive Apparent (24 September 1927)
- The Cleverness of Crockett (29 October 1927)
- August 13th (8 September 1928)
- The Photograph (15 September 1928)
- Between Calais and Dover (22 September 1928)
- The Bloodstained Handkerchief (6 October 1928)
- Wanted (13 October 1928)
- The Third Act (29 December 1928)
- The Secret of the Snow (9 February 1929)
- Open Warfare (16 February 1929)
- The Photographic Touch (9 March 1929)
- The "Times" Advertisement (30 March 1929)
- The Golden Idol (13 April 1929)

=== Short story collections ===
- Down the Green Stairs and Other Stories (Down the Green Stairs, February the Seventh, It Happened in a Fog, Tomatoes in Egg-Cups) (London, Todd, 1943)
- Waiting for the Police and Other Short Stories (The Other Side of the Bars, Waiting for the Police, Where's Mr. Jones?) (London, Todd, 1943)
- The Invisible Companion and Other Stories (February the Seventh, In Reverse, The Invisible Companion, The Room That Got Lost, Supper Is Served) (London, Todd, 1943)
- The Twist and Other Stories (The Twist, The Room, In Reverse) (London, Vallancey Press, 1944)
- The Haunted Lake and Other Stories (The Haunted Lake, Midnight Adventure, Supper is Served, Exchange is No Robbery) (London, Polybooks, 1945)
- Midnight Adventure and Other Stories (Midnight Adventure, The Vase and the Candlestick, Waiting for the Police, It Happened in the Fog, Exchange is No Robbery) (London & New York, Polybooks, 1946)

=== Other short stories ===
- The Tale of a Hat (A Romance of the Thames); Pearson's Magazine, issue 172, April 1910
- Unanswered Riddles; Pearson's Magazine, issue 201, September 1912
- Romance Passes By; My Best Thriller. A Collection of Stories Chosen by Their Own Authors, London: Faber, 1933
- The Room in the Tower; My Best Mystery Story: A Collection of Stories Chosen by Their Own Authors, London: Faber, 1939
- Secrets in the Snow; Stories of the Underworld, London: Faber, 1942
- Sergeant Dobbin Works It Out; Evening Standard Detective Book: Second Series, London: Gollancz, 1951

=== Plays ===
- Number 17 (1925)
- After Dark (1926)
- Enchantment (1927)
- Philomel (1932)

== See also ==
Farjeon family

== Other sources ==
- Bordman, Gerald Martin. American Theatre: A Chronicle of Comedy and Drama, 1914–1930. Oxford University Press, 1995.
- Krueger, Christine L. Encyclopedia of British Writers, 19th Century. Infobase Publishing, 2003.
