= 1969 in literature =

This article contains information about the literary events and publications of 1969.

== Events ==
- February 8 – After 147 years, the last issue of The Saturday Evening Post in its original form appears in the United States.
- March 23 – German-born writer Assia Wevill, a mistress of the English poet Ted Hughes and ex-wife of the Canadian poet David Wevill, gasses herself and their 4-year-old daughter Alexandra Tatiana Elise "Shura" Wevill at her London home.
- April 22 – The first Booker-McConnell Prize for fiction is awarded to P. H. Newby for Something to Answer For.
- August – "Penelope Ashe", purported author of a bestselling novel, Naked Came the Stranger, is revealed as a group of Newsday journalists.The book was co-written by a group of twenty-four journalists which was led by the Newsday columnist Mike McGrady.McGrady's intention was to write a book that was both deliberately terrible and which contained a lot of descriptions of sex, to illustrate the point that the popular American literary culture had become mindlessly vulgar. The book fulfilled the authors' expectations and became a bestseller in 1969. Later that year, the co-writers revealed the hoax, spurring the book's popularity.
- unknown date – The Times Literary Supplement begins using the abbreviation "TLS" on its title page.

== New books ==
=== Fiction ===
- Eva Alexanderson – Kontradans (Counter-dance)
- Eric Ambler – The Intercom Conspiracy
- Jorge Amado – Tenda dos Milagres (Tent of Miracles)
- Kingsley Amis – The Green Man
- William H. Armstrong – Sounder
- Penelope Ashe – Naked Came the Stranger
- Margaret Atwood – The Edible Woman
- René Barjavel – Les Chemins de Katmandou
- Ray Bradbury – I Sing the Body Electric
- Melvyn Bragg – The Hired Man
- Christianna Brand – Court of Foxes
- William S. Burroughs – The Last Words of Dutch Schultz
- Victor Canning – Queen's Pawn
- Louis-Ferdinand Céline – Rigadoon
- Agatha Christie – Hallowe'en Party
- Michael Crichton – The Andromeda Strain
- John Cheever – Bullet Park
- A. J. Cronin – A Pocketful of Rye
- Henry de Montherlant – Les Garçons (The Boys)
- L. Sprague de Camp – The Golden Wind
- Philip K. Dick – Ubik
- Marion Eames – Y Stafell Ddirgel (The Secret Room)
- John Fowles – The French Lieutenant's Woman
- George MacDonald Fraser – Flashman
- Paul Gallico – The Poseidon Adventure
- Rumer Godden – In This House of Brede
- Edward Gorey
  - The Epiplectic Bicycle
  - The Iron Tonic
- Graham Greene – Travels with My Aunt
- Sam Greenlee – The Spook Who Sat by the Door
- Günter Grass – Local Anaesthetic (Örtlich betäubt)
- Frank Herbert – Dune Messiah
- Raymond Hitchcock – Percy
- Richard Horn – Encyclopedia
- Robert E. Howard, L. Sprague de Camp and Lin Carter – Conan of Cimmeria
- B. S. Johnson – The Unfortunates
- David H. Keller – The Folsom Flint and Other Curious Tales
- Derek Lambert
  - Angels in the Snow
  - The Kites of War
- Ursula Le Guin – The Left Hand of Darkness
- Elmore Leonard – The Big Bounce
- Doris Lessing – The Four-Gated City
- H. P. Lovecraft and Others – Tales of the Cthulhu Mythos
- John D. MacDonald – Dress Her in Indigo
- Félicien Marceau – Creezy
- Yukio Mishima (三島 由紀夫) – Runaway Horses
- Michael Moorcock – Behold the Man
- C. L. Moore – Jirel of Joiry
- Vladimir Nabokov – Ada or Ardor: A Family Chronicle
- M. T. Vasudevan Nair – Kaalam ("Time")
- Patrick O'Brian – Master and Commander
- Don Pendleton – War Against The Mafia
- Chaim Potok – The Promise
- Manuel Puig – Little Painted Mouths
- Mario Puzo – The Godfather
- Ellery Queen – The Campus Murders
- Pauline Réage – Retour à Roissy
- Mordecai Richler – The Street
- Harold Robbins – The Inheritors
- Philip Roth – Portnoy's Complaint
- Gabriel Ruhumbika – Village in Uhuru
- Giorgio Scerbanenco
  - I milanesi ammazzano al sabato
  - Milano calibro 9
- Irwin Shaw – Rich Man, Poor Man
- Dag Solstad – Irr! Grønt!
- Rex Stout – Death of a Dude
- Jacqueline Susann – The Love Machine
- Theodore Taylor – The Cay
- Colin Thiele – Blue Fin
- Jack Vance
  - The Dirdir
  - Emphyrio
  - Servants of the Wankh
- Mario Vargas Llosa – Conversation in The Cathedral
- Kurt Vonnegut – Slaughterhouse-Five
- Charity Waciuma – Daughter of Mumbi
- Irving Wallace – The Seven Minutes
- Keith Waterhouse – Everything Must Go
- Colin Wilson – The Philosopher's Stone
- Roger Zelazny
  - Creatures of Light and Darkness
  - Damnation Alley
  - Isle of the Dead

=== Children and young people ===
- Rev. W. Awdry – Oliver the Western Engine (twenty-fourth in The Railway Series of 42 books by him and his son Christopher Awdry)
- Eric Carle – The Very Hungry Caterpillar
- Frances Carpenter – South American Wonder Tales
- Penelope Farmer – Charlotte Sometimes
- Rumer Godden – Operation Sippacik
- Gary Paulsen – Mr. Tucket (first in Mr. Tucket series)
- Barbara Sleigh – The Snowball
- William Steig – Sylvester and the Magic Pebble
- John Rowe Townsend – The Intruder
- Elfrida Vipont with Raymond Briggs – The Elephant and the Bad Baby
- Anne de Vries – Into the Darkness (first in the Reis door de nacht series of five books)

=== Drama ===
- Leilah Assunção – Fala Baixo Senão Eu Grito (Speak Quietly or I’ll Scream)
- Aimé Césaire – Une Tempête
- Dario Fo – Mistero Buffo
- Athol Fugard – Boesman and Lena
- Joe Orton – What the Butler Saw (posthumously premiered and published)
- Michael Pertwee – She's Done It Again
- Dennis Potter – Son of Man (television)
- Dalmiro Sáenz – Quién yo? (Who me?)
- David Storey – In Celebration
- Paul Zindel – Let Me Hear You Whisper

=== Poetry ===
- James Schuyler – Freely Espousing

=== Non-fiction ===
- Dean Acheson – Present at the Creation: My Years in the State Department
- Maya Angelou – I Know Why the Caged Bird Sings
- Fernand Braudel – Ecrits sur l'Histoire (translated as On History, 1980)
- H. Rap Brown – Die Nigger Die!
- Henri Charrière – Papillon
- L. Sprague de Camp and George H. Scithers (editors) – The Conan Swordbook
- Antonia Fraser – Mary Queen of Scots
- Søren Hansen and Jesper Jensen – The Little Red Schoolbook (Den Lille Røde Bog For Skoleelever)
- Pauline Kael – Going Steady
- Anton LaVey – The Satanic Bible
- Laurie Lee – As I Walked Out One Midsummer Morning
- Dwight Macdonald – On Movies
- Desmond Morris – The Human Zoo
- Harold Perkin – The Origins of Modern English Society 1780–1880
- Laurence J. Peter and Raymond Hull – The Peter Principle: Why Things Always Go Wrong
- David Reuben – Everything You Always Wanted to Know About Sex* (*But Were Afraid to Ask)

== Births ==
- January – Adrian Goldsworthy, Welsh military historian and novelist
- January 12 – David Mitchell, English novelist
- January 17 – Michael Moynihan, American journalist and publisher
- January 21 – M. K. Hobson, American speculative fiction author
- March – Jez Butterworth, English dramatist and screenwriter
- May 6 – Emmanuel Larcenet, French comics author
- May 6 – John Scalzi, American science-fiction author
- May 28 – Muriel Barbery, French novelist
- May 29 – Qiu Miaojin (邱妙津), Korean-born novelist (suicide 1995)
- June 13 – Virginie Despentes, French writer
- July 5 – Armin Kõomägi, Estonian author and screenwriter
- August 4 – Jojo Moyes, English journalist and romantic novelist
- September 12 – James Frey, American writer
- September 30 – Julianna Baggott, American novelist, essayist, and poet
- October 15 – Nora Ikstena, Latvian writer (died 2026)
- October 24 – Emma Donoghue, Irish-born Canadian novelist, dramatist, and academic
- November 13 – John Belluso, American dramatist (died 2006)
- November 22 – Marjane Satrapi, Iranian-born French author (died 2026)
- November 27 – Sidsel Dalen, Norwegian journalist and crime-fiction writer
- November 28 – Hanne Ørstavik, Norwegian novelist
- November 30 – David Auburn, American dramatist
- December 12 – Sophie Kinsella, English novelist (died 2025)
- unknown dates
  - John Harris, English writer, journalist and critic
  - Tom McCarthy, English novelist

== Deaths ==
- January 11 – Richmal Crompton, English children's writer (born 1890)
- January 21 – Giovanni Comisso, Italian writer (born 1895)
- March 9 – Charles Brackett, American novelist and screenwriter (born 1892)
- March 11 – John Wyndham, English science fiction novelist (born 1903)
- March 24 – Margery Fish, English gardening writer (born 1892)
- March 25 – Max Eastman, American writer (born 1883)
- March 26 – John Kennedy Toole, American novelist (suicide, born 1937)
- March 27 – B. Traven, presumed German-born novelist (unknown year of birth)
- April 6 – Gabriel Chevallier, French writer (born 1895)
- April 7 – Rómulo Gallegos, Venezuelan novelist and politician, 48th President of Venezuela (born 1884)
- May 4 – Osbert Sitwell, English novelist and poet (born 1892)
- July 24 – Witold Gombrowicz, Polish playwright and novelist (born 1904)
- July 27 – Vivian de Sola Pinto, English poet and memoirist (born 1895)
- August 10 – Maurine Dallas Watkins, American journalist/play and screenwriter (born 1896)
- August 14 – Leonard Woolf, English political theorist (born 1880)
- August 27 – Ivy Compton-Burnett, English novelist (born 1884)
- September 6 – Gavin Maxwell, Scottish naturalist and author (cancer, born 1914)
- September 17 – Greye La Spina, American dramatist and short story writer (born 1880)
- September 20 – Elinor Brent-Dyer, English children's writer (born 1894)
- September 22 – Rachel Davis Harris, African American librarian (born 1869)
- October 14 – August Sang, Estonian poet and literary translator (born 1914)
- October 21 – Jack Kerouac, American novelist and poet (internal hemorrhage, born 1922)
- November 6 – Susan Taubes, Hungarian American writer and Jewish intellectual (suicide, born 1928)
- November 15 – Ignacio Aldecoa, Spanish writer (born 1925)

== Awards ==
- Nobel Prize for Literature: Samuel Beckett

=== Canada ===
- See 1969 Governor General's Awards for a complete list of winners and finalists for those awards.

=== France ===
- Prix Goncourt: Félicien Marceau, Creezy
- Prix Médicis: Hélène Cixous, Dedans

=== United Kingdom ===
- Booker Prize: P. H. Newby, Something to Answer For
- Carnegie Medal for children's literature: K. M. Peyton, The Edge of the Cloud
- Cholmondeley Award: Derek Walcott, Tony Harrison
- Eric Gregory Award: Gavin Bantock, Jeremy Hooker, Jenny King, Neil Powell, Landeg E. White
- James Tait Black Memorial Prize for fiction: Elizabeth Bowen, Eva Trout
- James Tait Black Memorial Prize for biography: Antonia Fraser, Mary Queen of Scots
- Queen's Gold Medal for Poetry: Stevie Smith

=== United States ===
- American Academy of Arts and Letters Gold Medal for Drama: Tennessee Williams
- Hugo Award:
  - Best Novel: John Brunner, Stand on Zanzibar
  - Best Novella: Robert Silverberg, Nightwings
- Nebula Award: Ursula K. Le Guin, The Left Hand of Darkness
- Newbery Medal for children's literature: Lloyd Alexander, The High King
- Pulitzer Prize:
  - Drama: Howard Sackler, The Great White Hope
  - Fiction: N. Scott Momaday – House Made of Dawn
  - Poetry: George Oppen: Of Being Numerous

=== Elsewhere ===
- Friedenspreis des Deutschen Buchhandels: Alexander Mitscherlich
- Miles Franklin Award: George Johnston, Clean Straw for Nothing
- Premio Nadal: Francisco García Pavón, Las hermanas coloradas
- Viareggio Prize: Fulvio Tomizza, L'albero dei sogni
