= Death in High Heels (novel) =

1941 novel

- First edition
- Author: Christianna Brand
- Language: English
- Genre: Crime
- Publisher: The Bodley Head
- Publication date: 1941
- Publication place: United Kingdom
- Media type: Print

Death in High Heels is a 1941 crime novel by the British author Christianna Brand. Her debut novel, it featured Inspector Charlesworth, a young detective with Scotland Yard, who is called in when a young woman is murdered at an upmarket dress shop in London's Bond Street.

The same year Brand published Heads You Lose, the first novel featuring her best-known detective Inspector Cockrill, and she did not return to a solo sequel featuring Charlesworth until The Rose in Darkness in 1979. However, Charlesworth did make appearances in the Cockrill novels Death of Jezebel (1948) and London Particular (1952); additionally, the Mr Cecil character reappeared in the Cockrill novel Tour de Force (1955)

== Adaptation ==
In 1947 it was made into a film of the same title starring Don Stannard, Elsa Tee and Veronica Rose. It was produced as a second feature at Marylebone Studios and distributed by Exclusive Films.

== Bibliography ==
- Goble, Alan. The Complete Index to Literary Sources in Film. Walter de Gruyter, 1999.
- Hoffman, Megan. Gender and Representation in British ‘Golden Age’ Crime Fiction. Springer, 2016.
