= Nanny McPhee (musical) =

2027 musical by Emma Thompson

- Production poster
- Music: Gary Clark
- Lyrics: Gary Clark; Emma Thompson
- Book: Emma Thompson
- Basis: Nurse Matilda by Christianna Brand Nanny McPhee by Emma Thompson
- Premiere: Aldwych Theatre
- Productions: 2027 West End

Nanny McPhee is an upcoming stage musical with book and lyrics by Emma Thompson and music and lyrics by Gary Clark. It is based on the 2005 film of the same name with a screenplay by Thompson, which in turn is based on the children's book series Nurse Matilda by Christianna Brand. It is expected to open in November 2027 at London's Aldwych Theatre.

== Background ==
The musical is based on the 2005 film of the same name, by Emma Thompson. Starring Thompson in the title role it revolved around a widower who is unable to cope with his unruly seven children. After seventeen disastrous attempts at finding a nanny, the mysterious Nanny McPhee leaves her calling card. Arriving in the middle of a storm she uses unusual methods and magic, to restore order to the household.

In 2018, the musical had a workshop with Olivia Colman in the title role, Lily James and Rory Kinnear. During development Thompson was asked to reprise her role as Nanny McPhee, but was discouraged by Stephen Sondheim from starring in and writing the musical.

The film was previously adapted into a ballet.

== Production ==
=== West End (2027) ===
The musical is expected to receive its world premiere in London's West End beginning previews on 6 November 2027 at The Aldwych Theatre.

The play is written by Emma Thompson, with music by Gary Clark and lyrics by Thompson and Clark. It will be directed by Katy Rudd, with set and costume design by Rob Howell, lighting by Howard Hudson, choreography by Ellen Kane, illusions by Chris Fisher, puppetry by Samuel Wye and projections by Andrzej Goulding. It will feature orchestrations by Simon Hale, musical supervision by Nigel Lilley, arrangements by Hale and Lilley, and sound design by Ian Dickinson.
