= Green for Danger (film) =

1946 British film by Sidney Gilliat

- Theatrical film poster
- Directed by: Sidney Gilliat
- Written by: Sidney Gilliat; Claud Gurney
- Based on: Green for Danger by Christianna Brand
- Produced by: Frank Launder; Sidney Gilliat
- Starring: Sally Gray; Trevor Howard; Rosamund John; Alastair Sim; Leo Genn
- Cinematography: Wilkie Cooper
- Edited by: Thelma Myers
- Music by: William Alwyn
- Production company: Individual Pictures
- Distributed by: General Film Distributors
- Release dates: 7 December 1946 (UK); August 1947 (U.S.)
- Running time: 91 minutes
- Country: United Kingdom
- Language: English
- Budget: over $1 million or £202,400
- Box office: £175,800 (UK £114,700 overseas £61,100)

Green for Danger (also known as The Mad Killer) is a 1946 British mystery thriller film directed by Sidney Gilliat and starring Sally Gray, Trevor Howard, Rosamund John, Leo Genn and Alastair Sim. It was written by Gilliat and Claud Gurney, based on the 1944 detective novel of the same name by Christianna Brand. The film was shot at Pinewood Studios in England. The title is a reference to the colour-coding used on the gas cylinders used by anaesthetists.

== Plot ==
Inspector Cockrill is typing a report to his chief at Scotland Yard on the "amazing events" beginning on 17th August 1944, with postman Joseph Higgins "the first to die". We see the operating theatre and the personnel in a rural hospital. "Two will be dead, one a murderer".

The V-1 offensive sends flying bombs far from London. Higgins reports for duty as a warden, and a "doodlebug" hits. A wireless plays in the wreckage –an Englishwoman giving a Nazi propaganda broadcast.

Higgins comes into the hospital unconscious, without identification. Mr. Eden commiserates with Nurse Sanson about the nightmares she has had since the death of her mother, suggesting the work with bombing victims is a reminder.

Nurse Linley tells Eden that she has broken her engagement to Dr. Barnes, an anaesthetist. A bomb lands, and they kiss under the watchful eye of Sister Bates. Sister Bates runs away, hiding tears. Sanson recognises Higgins, who reminds her of her mother. Before surgery, Woods recognised the name. Higgins becomes distressed when he hears Woods' voice.

Barnes administers the anaesthetic. Something is wrong. Full oxygen is of no help. "They neglected nothing," Cockrill says. "Joseph Higgins was quite dead".

At a big staff party, a bitter Bates warns Barnes that Eden is after Linley. She announces to the party that she has proof that Higgins was murdered. Leaving the party, she goes through the windy night to the operating theatre to retrieve her proof and is met by a gowned and masked figure holding a scalpel. Linley finds her body.

Cockrill arrives and interviews the five suspects: Barnes, Eden, Linley, Sanson and Woods. He reveals that Bates was stabbed to death, then dressed in a gown and stabbed a second time. In addition, some poison pills are missing.

Barnes shows Cockrill the anaesthesia set-up. "There was the vital evidence," Cockrill recalls, "Right under my nose… It might have saved another life". The investigation continues.

Linley has suspicions, but the others advise her to talk to Cockrill. She goes to bed. Woods puts a shilling in the gas meter to heat a kettle. The gas fire in Linley's room is on but not lit.

Sanson calls for help but falls, dropping Linley downstairs headfirst.

The Inspector meets with the suspects. He reveals that Higgins recognised the voice of Woods' twin sister on the wireless. Linley has a skull fracture. A craniotomy is required, or she will not recover –and tell what she knows. Cockrill asks them to re-enact the operation that killed Higgins. Eden is not a brain surgeon, so he will assist Mr. Purdy. Eden provokes Barnes, who socks him, and Cockrill enjoys the resulting brawl. His laughter brings the two men to their senses.

In fact, Nurse Linley is recovering nicely. Cockrill has a plan to trap the murderer. He exits, saying that he thinks he knows who did it.

Prepping for surgery, Woods installs a new oxygen bottle, as she did with Higgins. Linley is anaesthetized and soon shows signs of distress. She does not respond to pure oxygen. When the reserve oxygen bottle is connected, she recovers. Cockrill scratches black paint off the original "oxygen" bottle, revealing the green surface signalling carbon dioxide.

Bates was wearing a gown with a piece of it cut out and hidden by the knife, which Linley noticed. Cockrill points to the fresh black paint on Woods' gown. The murderer concealed a corresponding stain by stabbing Bates.

Cockrill's questioning focuses on Sanson. Eden surreptitiously prepares a hypodermic, then warns the inspector to back off. Sanson runs into the next room. Eden follows with the hypodermic and locks the door. Cockrill breaks in, smashes it, and arrests Sanson.

Sanson's mother was buried in an air raid. Higgins, who was leading the rescue effort in his capacity as a warden, dug for three days before giving up. She was found alive the next day, but died an hour later. According to Eden, she transferred her feelings of guilt over having left her mother alone in the house to Higgins, and then she had to protect herself. Sanson collapses, dead. The Inspector accuses Eden of assisting a murderer. He reveals that he was trying to give her the antidote to the poison tablets (although instead of communicating this to the others, he locked himself and Sanson in the other room, making everyone think he was up to no good). Cockrill is speechless.

Cockrill concludes his letter to his superior by offering his resignation, "in the confident hope that you will not accept it".

== Cast ==
- Sally Gray as Nurse "Freddie" Linley
- Trevor Howard as Dr Barnes
- Rosamund John as Nurse Esther Sanson
- Alastair Sim as Inspector Cockrill
- Leo Genn as Mr. Eden
- Judy Campbell as Sister Bates
- Megs Jenkins as Nurse Woods
- Moore Marriott as Joseph Higgins
- Henry Edwards as Mr. Purdy
- Ronald Adam as Dr. White
- George Woodbridge as Detective Sergeant Hendricks
- Frank Ling as rescue worker
- Wendy Thompson as Sister Carter
- John Rae as the porter

== Production ==
The film was based on a novel by Christianna Brand. She was married to a surgeon who was assigned to a military hospital. She went along to watch an operation, and the anaesthetist told her how to commit murder. She thought of turning this into a thriller but could not think of a motive until a drunk man told her of an experience in a bomb shelter. She wrote the book, which was published in 1944. The New York Times called it "extremely involved."

Sidney Gilliat said he bought a copy of the novel at Victoria Station to read on a train. Though not attracted by the detective or the hospital setting, he said, "what appealed to me was the anaesthetics - the rhythmic ritual, from wheeling the patient out to putting him out and keeping him out (in this case, permanently), with all those crosscutting opportunities offered by flowmeters, hissing gas, cylinders, palpitating rubber bags, and all the other trappings, in the middle of the Blitz, too."

In December 1945, the film was announced as a project for Individual Pictures, the company of Gilliat and Frank Launder. In January 1946, it was announced that Robert Morley would star. Morley was eventually replaced by Alastair Sim.

It was the first movie to be made at Pinewood Studios when it reopened after World War II. Pinewood was to be the basis for three companies: Individual, Cineguild, and the Archers.

== Reception ==
The film was originally banned out of fear it would undermine confidence in hospitals. This was overruled and the film was passed with one minor cut.

=== Box office ===
According to trade papers, the film was a "notable box office attraction" at British cinemas in 1947. According to Rank's records, it had lost £26,600 (equivalent to £812,700 in 2025) by 24 December 1949.

=== Critical ===
The Monthly Film Bulletin wrote: "Though the story has plenty of improbabilities when considered in cold blood, this thriller holds one well when on the screen. Alastair Sim is most amusing as the self-important detective who enjoys tormenting his suspects, but who comes a partial cropper despite his assurance."

Leslie Halliwell noted that it was a "classic comedy-thriller, with serious detection balanced by excellent jokes and performances, also by moments of fright".

François Truffaut later argued the film "didn't quite come off".

The New York Times stated: "Sidney Gilliat and Frank Launder have laid deftly humorous hands on the subject of murder. And, while they manage to keep the spectator chuckling most of the time, they never for a moment lose sight of a mystery film's prime purpose—that is, to intrigue and startle the onlooker. What more could one ask? In the case of Green For Danger one could reasonably request just a bit more justification for the solution, which, truth to tell, is bewildering."

The Brooklyn Eagle was enthusiastic and praised the film as "an expert concoction of thrills, homicide, and laughs. It's also a fine showcase for the talents of Alastair Sim, a new type of detective with a sense of humor. He easily dominates this melodrama about an old English estate that has been converted into a hospital. It's during World War II and there's dirty work afoot. Plenty of it, with two murders, one near-murder, and one dramatic death. Who says the English have no sense of humor? Green for Danger will convince them otherwise. And give them some chills at the same time."

For the Buffalo Courier-Express, the film was "an ambitious, highly acceptable murder melodrama...expertly acted and smartly directed....the musical score is a big asset."

== Home video releases ==
The Criterion Collection released Green for Danger on laserdisc in 1993, with optional audio commentary by Bruce Eder. Home Vision Cinema released it on VHS at the same time. Criterion released the film on DVD in 2007 with Eder's commentary and a 2007 interview documentary produced by Heather Shaw, "Geoff Brown on Green for Danger" (Brown being the author of a book on the work of Gilliat and Launder). The DVD also includes a booklet with an essay on the film by Geoffrey O'Brien and a programme note by Gilliat from a 1960s revival screening.
