= Encyclopedia (disambiguation) =

An encyclopedia is a type of reference work.

Encyclopedia may also refer to:

- Encyclopedia (album), 2014, by The Drums
- Encyclopedia (novel), 1969, by Richard Horn
- Encyclopedia (TV series), an HBO television series
- Encyclopédia, a French TV channel
- Encyclopedia Brown, a book series featuring the boy detective Leroy Brown, nicknamed "Encyclopedia"

== See also ==
- Encyclopedic dictionary
- Encyclopedic knowledge
- Lists of encyclopedias
- Uncyclopedia
