= Death in High Heels =

1947 British short film by Lionel Tomlinson

- Opening titles
- Directed by: Lionel Tomlinson
- Based on: Death in High Heels by Christianna Brand
- Produced by: Henry Halsted
- Starring: Don Stannard; Elsa Tee; Veronica Rose
- Cinematography: Stanley Clinton
- Production company: Marylebone-Hammer Productions
- Distributed by: Exclusive Films
- Release date: July 18, 1947
- Running time: 48 minutes
- Country: United Kingdom
- Language: English

Death in High Heels is a 1947 British second feature ('B') crime film directed by Lionel Tomlinson (credited as "Tommy Tomlinson") and starring Don Stannard, Elsa Tee and Veronica Rose. It was based on the 1941 novel of the same title by Christianna Brand. The screenwriter's name is unknown. It was a very early Hammer Films (here Marylebone-Hammer) production and was released through Exclusive Films, Hammer's original incarnation. Its brief running time causes it to barely qualify as a feature in some reference books. An existing copy is on YouTube and runs about 45 minutes.

== Plot ==
Magda Doon, who works at a luxury Bond Street dress shop, is murdered. It turns out that the poison which killed her was in fact intended for her unpopular colleague Agnes Gregory. Detective Charlesworth investigates, finding that every member of the staff seems to have something to hide.

== Cast ==
- Don Stannard as Detective Charlesworth
- Elsa Tee as Victoria David
- Veronica Rose as Agnes Gregory
- Denise Anthony as Aileen
- Patricia Laffan as Magda Doon
- Diana Wong as Miss Almond Blossom
- Nora Gordon as Miss Arris
- Bill Hodge as Mr Cecil
- Kenneth Warrington as Frank Bevan
- Leslie Spurling as Sergeant Bedd

== Reception ==
The Monthly Film Bulletin wrote: "The acting of most of the cast is stilted and the only three who seem at all happy in their parts are Don Stannard as the handsome Charlesworth, Leslie Spurling as his assistant, and Bill Hodge as an effeminate dress designer. There is an overabundance of dialogue and, for a murder mystery the film lacks suspense."

Kine Weekly wrote: "Its plot contains ingenuity and its de luxe dress shop atmosphere is not without glamour, and between the two it manages to triumph over a slightly amateurish script."

Picture Show wrote: "Artificial, unconvincing melodrama, heavily laden with dialogue."

In British Sound Films: The Studio Years 1928–1959 David Quinlan rated the film as "poor", calling it an "unconvincing thriller that hardly does justice to the author's original novel."
