= Nanny McPhee and the Big Bang =

- UK theatrical release poster
- Directed by: Susanna White
- Written by: Emma Thompson
- Based on: Characters by Christianna Brand
- Produced by: Lindsay Doran; Tim Bevan; Eric Fellner
- Starring: Emma Thompson; Maggie Gyllenhaal; Rhys Ifans; Asa Butterfield; Lil Woods; Oscar Steer; Eros Vlahos; Rosie Taylor-Ritson; Ewan McGregor; Ralph Fiennes; Sam Kelly; Sinead Matthews; Katy Brand; Bill Bailey; Maggie Smith
- Cinematography: Mike Eley
- Edited by: Sim Evan-Jones
- Music by: James Newton Howard
- Production companies: StudioCanal; Relativity Media; Working Title Films; Three Strange Angels Productions
- Distributed by: Universal Pictures (International); StudioCanal (France)
- Release dates: 2 April 2010 (Europe); 20 August 2010 (North America)
- Running time: 109 minutes
- Countries: United Kingdom; United States; France
- Language: English
- Budget: $35 million
- Box office: $93.2 million

Nanny McPhee and the Big Bang (Note: released in the United States and Canada as Nanny McPhee Returns) is a 2010 period fantasy comedy film directed by Susanna White, produced by Tim Bevan, Eric Fellner and Lindsay Doran with music by James Newton Howard and co-produced by StudioCanal, Relativity Media, Working Title Films and Three Strange Angels. It is a sequel to the 2005 film Nanny McPhee. It was written by Emma Thompson, based on Christianna Brand's Nurse Matilda books. Thompson reprises her role as Nanny McPhee, and it also stars Maggie Gyllenhaal, Ralph Fiennes, Rhys Ifans, Ewan McGregor, Asa Butterfield and Maggie Smith.

Unlike its predecessor, Metro-Goldwyn-Mayer was not involved in the film's production. It was theatrically released on 2 April 2010 in Europe by Universal Pictures. Like its predecessor, It received positive reviews from critics and it earned $93.2 million on a $35 million budget. It also received a Young Artist Award nomination for Best Performance in a Feature Film. The film was released on DVD and Blu-ray in the UK on 19 June 2010.

== Plot ==
Isabel Green is driven to her wit's end by her hectic life while her husband, Rory, goes off to fight in the Second World War. Between trying to keep the family farm up and running and her job in the village shop, run by the slightly loopy Mrs. Docherty, she also has three boisterous children to look after: 12-year-old Norman, 11-year-old Megan ‘Megsie’ and 6-year-old Vincent.

When the children's wealthy, pompous and snobbish city cousins, 12 year-old Cyril and his younger sister 11-year-old Celia, are evacuated to live with them in the countryside and the conflict escalates, only adding to Isabel's problems, which Isabel discovers the multiple references for a "Nanny McPhee" throughout the village shop.

The mysterious and magical Nanny McPhee then arrives to help. At first, the children refuse to listen and carry on fighting, which Nanny McPhee soon puts a stop to with her magic, making them hurt themselves like they did each other and even destroy items, including nearly throwing letters away sent by the absent Rory. Luckily, everything is put back to normal after the children apologise to one another.

Meanwhile, Isabel's brother-in-law Phil has gambled away his half of the farm, and is being chased by two hired female assassins working for a casino owner named Mrs. Biggles. Phil desperately attempts to make Isabel sell her half of the farm, including setting loose the litter of piglets to be sold to a neighbouring farmer, but the plot is thwarted by the children; leading them to bond as they co-operate to recapture the pigs.

Isabel takes everyone on a picnic as an offer of gratitude, during which Mrs. Docherty's ARP Warden husband warns them about bombs and relates how he imagines a pilot might accidentally release one. Phil subsequently delivers a telegram stating that Rory was killed in action.

Everyone believes the news except Norman, who is sure his father is alive because he "can feel it in [his] bones". He tells this to Cyril, who thinks he is just upset, but then believes that Norman might be right. They convince Nanny McPhee to take them to the War Office in London, where Cyril and Celia's father, Lord Gray, holds a senior position; believing he will know the truth.

Lord Gray sneers at Norman's disbelief at his father's death, but after Cyril reveals that he knows he is divorcing their mother and criticises him for his neglect as a parent, Lord Gray investigates what has happened. While he is gone, Norman asks Cyril where he will live following the divorce; upon learning Cyril rarely sees either of his parents, Norman says that he and Celia are welcome to live permanently with the Greens. Lord Gray returns and tells Norman that his father is merely missing in action, and that there is no record of a telegram being sent to his mother and Norman deduces that Phil forged the message.

While the older boys are at the War Office, Megsie, Celia and Vincent try to stop Isabel from signing Phil's papers and selling the farm by creating distractions, such as pretending that a mouse was in the kitchen and hiding the pens, though Phil finds one in Megsie's pocket. However, as Isabel is finally signing the farm away, a German pilot accidentally drops a huge bomb on the Greens' barley field; it does not explode, but the impact is strong enough to cover Phil's papers with ink; ruining Isabel's signature.

When Nanny McPhee, Norman and Cyril return, Phil admits to Norman's accusation of forgery and is handcuffed to the oven by Isabel. The children go out to watch Mr. Docherty defuse the bomb, but when he faints, Megsie takes over, succeeding with the help of the other children and Nanny McPhee's jackdaw friend Mr. Edelweiss.

Nanny McPhee helps to harvest the barley with a little magic, saving Phil from Mrs. Biggles' hitwomen in the process. While everyone celebrates, Nanny McPhee begins to leave. Mrs. Docherty explains to the Greens that Nanny McPhee leaves when she is no longer needed, revealing her identity as baby Agatha from the first film. Isabel and the children chase after Nanny McPhee, only to see Rory, with a bandaged arm, making his way back to them. He drops his kit bag, runs to his family and they all embrace.

In a post-credits scene, Ellie, an elephant conjured by Nanny McPhee, (to share Vincent's bed and help steal the pens from Phil), is seen enjoying the magically operated Scratch-o-Matic invented for the piglets.

== Cast ==
- Emma Thompson as Nanny McPhee, the nanny who changes the lives of the Green and Gray children.
- Maggie Gyllenhaal as Isabel Green, the frazzled mother of Norman, Megsie and Vincent.
- Rhys Ifans as Phil Green, Norman's, Megsie's and Vincent's uncle (no relation to Cyril and Celia), Rory's older brother and Isabel's brother-in-law. He tries to sell the farm because he gambled it away at a casino.
- Asa Butterfield as Norman Green, the eldest of the Green children.
- Lil Woods as Megan ‘Megsie’ Green, the middle and only girl of the Green children.
- Oscar Steer as Vincent Green, the youngest of the Green children.
- Eros Vlahos as Cyril Gray, the spoilt cousin of Norman, Megsie and Vincent. He becomes kinder throughout the film and befriends Norman.
- Rosie Taylor-Ritson as Celia Gray, the other spoilt cousin of Norman, Megsie and Vincent. She also becomes kinder throughout the film and befriends Megsie.
- Maggie Smith as Mrs Agatha Docherty (née Brown), the owner of the shop at which Mrs Green works. Near the end she is revealed to be baby Aggie from the first film, now an old lady.
- Ewan McGregor as Rory Green, Isabel's husband, Phil's younger brother and the father of the Greens, away fighting in the Second World War.
- Ralph Fiennes as Lord Gray, Cyril's and Celia's father, a high-ranking official in the War Office.
- Sam Kelly as Mr Algernon Docherty, Mrs Docherty's husband, who is an ARP (Air Raid Precautions) Warden.
- Sinead Matthews as Miss Topsey, a henchwoman of Mrs Biggles, the woman who owns the casino at which Phil gambled the farm away.
- Katy Brand as Miss Turvey, the colleague of Miss Topsey.
- Bill Bailey as Farmer MacReadie, the farmer who buys the piglets from the Greens.
- Nonso Anozie as Sergeant Ralph Jeffreys, a guard at the War Office, and a former charge of Nanny McPhee.
- Daniel Mays as Blenkinsop, Cyril's and Celia's chauffeur.
- Ed Stoppard as Lieutenant Addis, a coworker of Lord Gray.
- Toby Sedgwick as an enemy plane pilot.

== Production ==
=== Filming locations ===
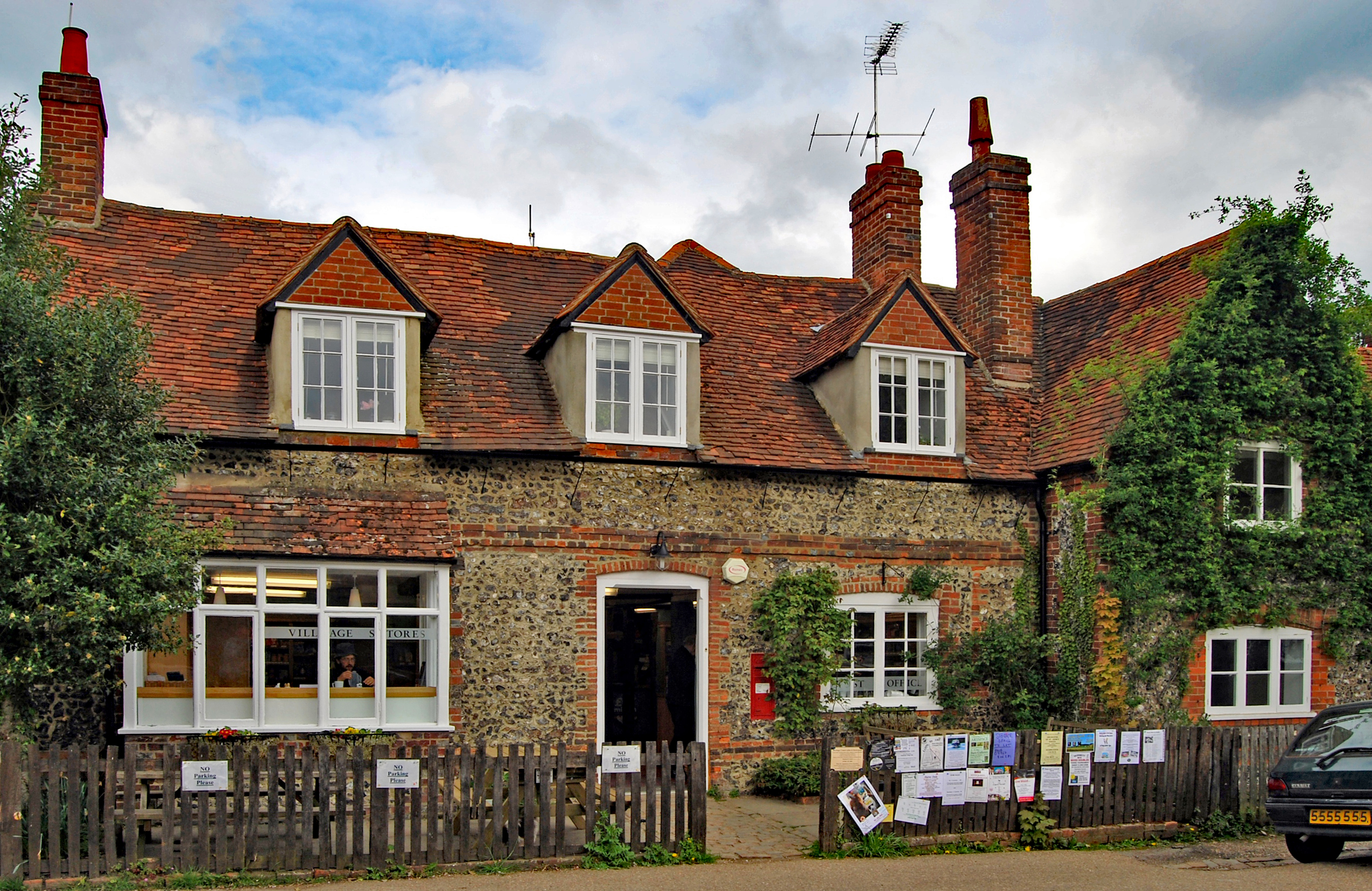
Hambleden was one of the film's locations.

The village in the film is Hambleden in Buckinghamshire, the farm set and scenes were filmed in Hascombe, near Godalming in Surrey and the War Office scenes, both interior and exterior, were filmed at the University of London, and the motorcycle scenes on various roads in London. Dunsfold Aerodrome, a filming location for the television programme Top Gear, name Nanny McPhee and the Big Bang as being filmed there, with more filming taking place at Shepperton Studios.

== Release ==
=== Theatrical ===
It was released theatrically on 2 April 2010 in Europe.

=== Home media ===
It was released on DVD and Blu-ray in the UK on 19 June 2010. Nanny McPhee Returns, as the film was renamed for the North American market for undisclosed reasons, was released on DVD and Blu-ray on 14 December 2010.

=== Other media ===
Emma Thompson wrote a novelisation of the film. She narrated its audiobook and included a behind-the-scenes diary. Thompson won the Audie Award for Narration by the Author and was nominated for an Audie Award for Middle Grade Title and a Grammy Award for Best Spoken Word Album for Children for her narration.

== Reception ==
=== Critical response ===
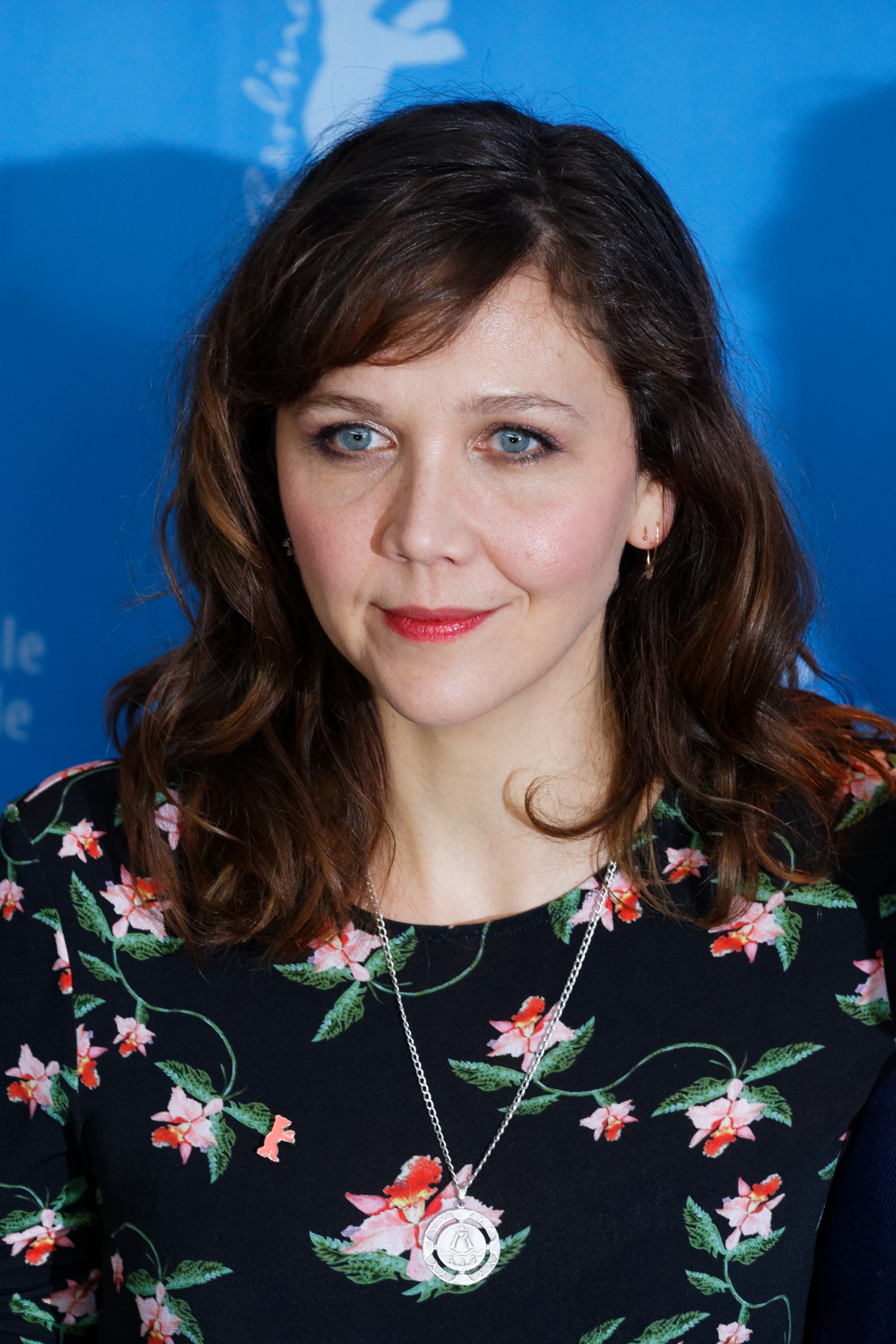
Critics praised Maggie Gyllenhaal for her performance.

The review-aggregation website Rotten Tomatoes reports an approval rating of 76% based on 120 reviews, with an average rating of 6.5/10. The site's critical consensus reads: "Emma Thompson's second labor of love with the Nanny McPhee character actually improves on the first, delivering charming family fare with an excellent cast." Metacritic calculated an average score of 52 out of 100 based on 25 reviews, indicating "mixed or average reviews". Audiences polled by CinemaScore gave the film an average grade of "A−" on an A+ to F scale. The Independent also gave a favourable review, with praise given to the actors and Thompson's script."

=== Box office ===
In the UK the film opened at number one, with £2,586,760, outperforming the new release The Blind Side, grossing a total of £16,211,057. In the United States and Canada it debuted in seventh position with $8.4 million. Gross exceeded $27 million.

=== Awards ===
Award	Category	Nominee	Result
IFMCA Award	Best Original Score for a Comedy Film and Film Composer of the Year	James Newton Howard for The Last Airbender, Love & Other Drugs, Salt, and The Tourist	Nominated
National Movie Award	Best Family Movie		Nominated
Silver Medal	Introductions and Lead-in titles	Paul Donnellon (Director); David Z. Obadiah (Producer); Andrew White (Designer); Noel Donnellon (Producer); VooDooDog	Won
Young Artist Award	Best Performance in a Feature Film – Leading Young Actor	Eros Vlahos	Nominated

== Cancelled sequel ==
A third film, to be set in 21st-century England, was planned, but the sequel did not meet studio expectations and plans for further films were cancelled.
