= Going Steady =

Going steady refers to a form of dating.

Going Steady may refer to:

- Going Steady (book), film reviews by Pauline Kael
- Going Steady (1958 film), American film
- Going Steady (1979 film), Israeli comedy
- Going Steady (Buzzcocks album), also known as Singles – Going Steady
- Going Steady, album by Steady B
