= Suddenly at His Residence =

1946 novel

- First edition
- Author: Christianna Brand
- Language: English
- Series: Inspector Cockrill
- Genre: Crime
- Publisher: The Bodley Head (UK); Dodd, Mead and Company (US)
- Publication date: 1946
- Publication place: United Kingdom
- Media type: Print
- Preceded by: Green for Danger
- Followed by: Death of Jezebel

Suddenly at His Residence is a 1946 crime novel by the British writer Christianna Brand. It is the third in a series featuring her detective Inspector Cockrill. In the United States it was published using the alternative title The Crooked Wreath.

== Synopsis ==
During the final months of the Second World War, a man is murdered on the very evening he intends to disinherit his various family members.

== Bibliography ==
- Bargainnier, Earl F. & Dove George N. Cops and Constables: American and British Fictional Policemen. Popular Press, 1986.
- Reilly, John M. Twentieth Century Crime & Mystery Writers. Springer, 2015.
