= Creezy (film) =

Tender Scoundrel
- Directed by: Pierre Granier-Deferre
- Written by: Pierre Granier-Deferre; Pascal Jardin
- Story by: Félicien Marceau
- Starring: Alain Delon; Sydne Rome
- Cinematography: Walter Wottitz
- Music by: Philippe Sarde
- Release date: 1974
- Language: French
- Box office: $6 million

Creezy (French: La Race des seigneurs) is a 1974 French film directed by Pierre Granier-Deferre and starring Alain Delon. It is based on the novel Creezy by Félicien Marceau.

It recorded admissions of 801,704 at the French box office.

== Plot ==
Julien Dandieu is a senior figure in the Unified Republican Party (PRU), (Note: This Gaullist party is fictional.) which has a chance of political power in a conservative coalition after the forthcoming election. His wife and son need his support but his political ambitions come first. Then he and a beautiful model, the "Creezy" (= "crazy") of the title, fall in love, and she wants to come first in his attentions. After badgering his best friend into abandoning his ideals to support him, he is elected and rewarded with his longed-for ministry, but at the moment of triumph he must choose between keeping an appointment with her and attending a formal ceremony. He chooses the latter, and when he finds her she has killed herself.

== Cast ==
- Alain Delon as Julien Dandieu
- Sydne Rome as Creezy
- Jeanne Moreau as Renee Vibert
- Claude Rich as Dominique
- Jean-Marc Bory as Savarin
- Jean-Pierre Castaldi as Collard
- Louis Seigner as Garcin
- Madeleine Ozeray as Madame Dandieu
