= Old Iron =

- Tom Walls, David Tree and Leslie Perrins in a scene from the film
- Directed by: Tom Walls
- Written by: Ben Travers
- Produced by: Tom Walls
- Starring: Tom Walls; Eva Moore; Cecil Parker; Veronica Rose
- Cinematography: Mutz Greenbaum
- Edited by: Lynn Harrison
- Music by: Louis Levy
- Production company: Tom Walls Productions
- Distributed by: British Lion Film
- Release date: December 1938
- Running time: 80 minutes
- Country: United Kingdom
- Language: English

Old Iron is a 1938 British comedy-drama film directed by Tom Walls and starring Walls, Richard Ainley, Henry Hewitt, Eva Moore and Cecil Parker. It was written by Ben Travers and was made at Shepperton Studios.

== Plot ==
Overbearing but kind-hearted old industrialist Sir Henry Woodstock (known as "Old Iron" to his family) quarrels with his favourite son Harry because Harry wishes to marry the daughter of a business opponent whom he suspects of shady practices. Harry, who has inherited his father's temperament, drives away in a blind fury, runs a man down and kills him. At his trial for manslaughter Sir Henry's testimony as to the quarrel, and the mental disturbance that must have resulted from the conflict in Harry's mind between love of his father and determination to do what he himself thought right, secures Harry's acquittal.

== Cast ==
- Tom Walls as Sir Henry Woodstock
- Eva Moore as Lady Woodstock
- Cecil Parker as Barnett
- Richard Ainley as Harry Woodstock
- David Tree as Michael
- Veronica Rose as Lorna Barnett
- Enid Stamp-Taylor as Eileen Penshaw
- Leslie Perrins as Richard Penshaw
- Arthur Wontner as Judge
- Henry Hewitt as Wilfred
- O. B. Clarence as Gordon

== Reception ==
The Monthly Film Bulletin wrote: "The story will appeal to those who are interested by character rather than by incident, and who do not decry as 'sentimental' the expression of a good deal of affection between father and son. Tom Walls' portrayal of the character of Sir Henry is most enjoyable; Richard Ainley as Harry seemed a trifle theatrical, and the recording is not very kind to his voice. Henry Hewitt is very amusing as Sir Henry's insignificant brother Wilfred; one of the best moments in the film is provided by some trick photography whereby a ghostly Sir Henry humbly receives from the nincompoop Wilfred a moral lecture which Wilfred is rehearsing in an empty railway-carriage. The remaining parts do not give very much scope to the actors. The settings are competent and the photography good, but the sound seems a trifle harsh."

The Daily Film Renter wrote: "Tom Walls turns in novel portrayal as stern disciplinary martinet whose obstinate adherence to iron-clad principles brings him into conflict with family, but certain staginess of development has effect of promoting atmosphere of artificiality, although moments of pathos help out, and stellar portrayal has vintage touch. Good general booking."

Kine Weekly wrote: "Tom Walls has a part of heavy responsibility as Sir Henry, but he is more than equal to most of the demands. It is only during the sentimental moments that he falters. Richard Ainley is extremely good as Harry, there is genuine feeling in his portrayal and Eva Moore acts with understanding as Lucy, Sir Henry's wife. ... The picture is no powerful nor original contribution to screen fiction, but it is nevertheless good character comedy drama."

Picturegoer wrote: "Tom Walls forsakes farce for comedy-drama in his latest picture...The change is not for the better. Old Iron is a verbose play with Tom Walls doing most of talking, on rather remote Galsworthian lines. ... The best performance comes from Eva Moore as the magnate's long-suffering wife."
