= Tour de Force (novel) =

1955 novel

- First edition
- Author: Christianna Brand
- Cover artist: Freda Nichols
- Language: English
- Series: Inspector Cockrill
- Genre: Mystery
- Publisher: Michael Joseph
- Publication date: 1955
- Publication place: United Kingdom
- Media type: Print
- Preceded by: London Particular

Tour de Force is a 1955 mystery crime novel by the author Christianna Brand. It was the sixth novel in a series featuring the fictional police detective Inspector Cockrill. It was the last full-length novel in which Cockrill appears, although he features in some short stories. His sister Henrietta also features in the 1957 novel The Three Cornered Halo which uses the same setting as this work. Additionally, the minor character Mr Cecil from Death in High Heels (1941) appears in a more prominent role.

== Synopsis ==
Against his better judgement Cockrill travels for a holiday on a Mediterranean island republic off the coast of Italy. When a murder is committed he becomes the initial suspect for the local investigating officer, whose methods he find inept. He sets out to solve the crime himself.

== Bibliography ==
- Bargainnier, Earl F. & Dove George N. Cops and Constables: American and British Fictional Policemen. Popular Press, 1986.
- Reilly, John M. Twentieth Century Crime & Mystery Writers. Springer, 2015.
