= Mandet Museum =

- Musée Mandet
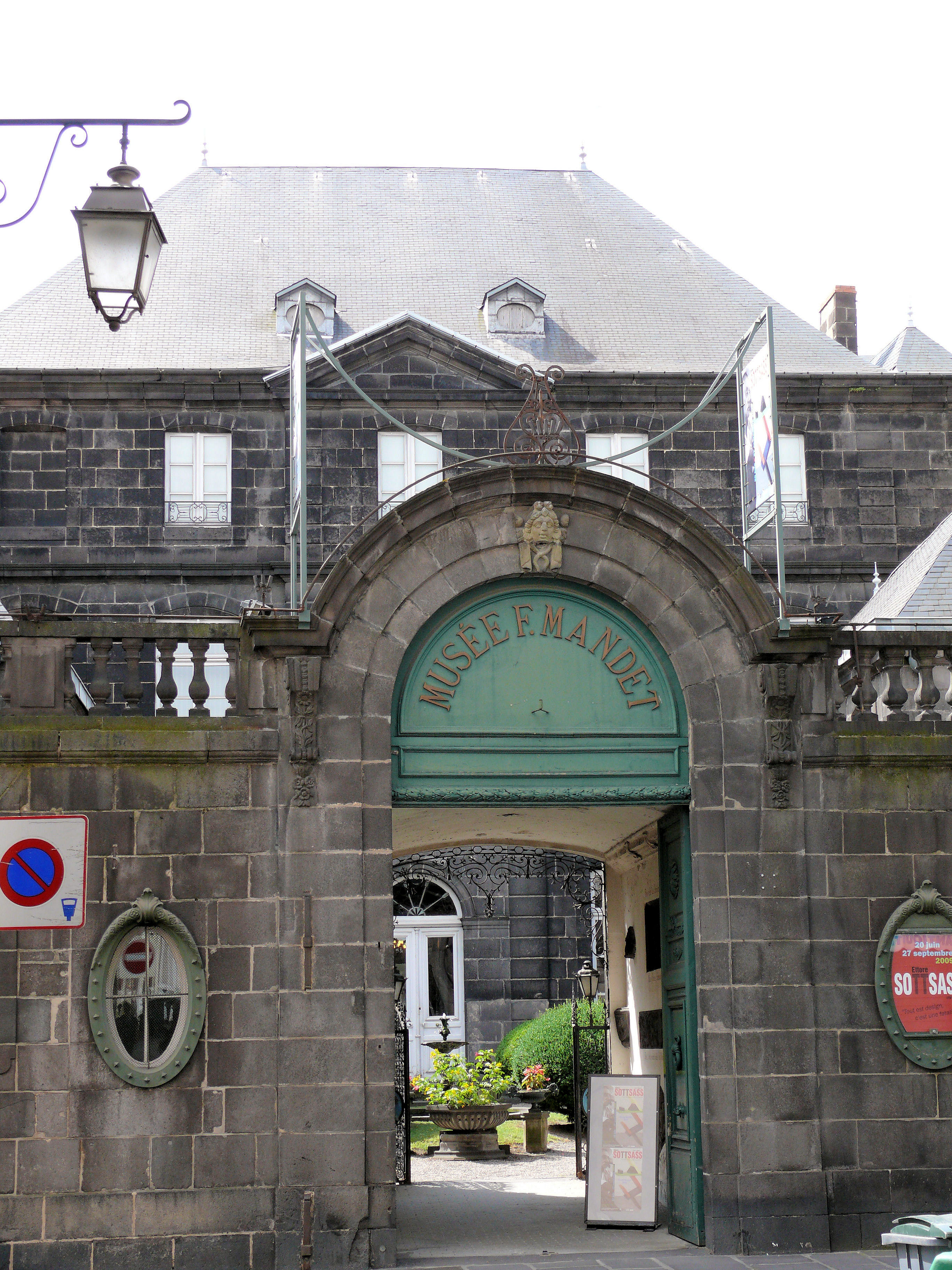
- Established: 1866
- Location: Riom, France
- Coordinates: 45.8902°N 3.1441°E
- Type: Art museum
- Collection size: 6000
- Website: www.riom-communaute.fr/decouvrir/musees/musee-mandet.html

The Mandet Museum is an art museum in Riom, France and is housed in two 18th-century mansions connected by a gallery. It was originally labeled the Museum of France and is named after Francisque Mandet, President of the Museum Society. The first building known as the hotel Dufraisse is an example of Parisan architecture. It has collections of paintings and sculptures from the sixteenth to the nineteenth century. The two buildings combined contain around 6000 items including antiques, goldsmithery, paintings, sculptures, glassware and furniture to name a few.

The Museum gained a lot more attention starting in 2011 when a new department dedicated to Design and Contemporary Decorative Arts was introduced on the ground floor of the building's east wing. After this new department, the court and the museum entrance porch regained their original forms of the 18th century, enhanced by the contemporary work of artist Helen Mugot “Nowise”.

Ever since, many other contemporary artists have contributed works to the museum. Some of these contributions include a crystal chandelier that is shaped as an overturned chair and the four sconces of Géraldine Gonzalez. This is presented in the hall of honor of the museum.

The second hotel was restored in 1983 and houses a wide collection of objects. It includes art/decorative art that are antiques and pieces that date back to the eighteenth century. It was made possible by generous Riomese donors; Marie-Joseph and Edouard Richard.

== History ==
The building was built between 1707 and 1709 out of Volvic stone and initially housed the Dufraisse du Cheix hotel. It was classified as a historical monument in 1963 The hotel was converted to a museum in 1866 by the magistrate and historian Francisque Mandet, after whom it was named.

== Buildings ==
=== The first building (eighteenth century) ===
The first building, created in the eighteenth century, has the collection that was built in the nineteenth century. This includes paintings of religion, history, genre, portraits, landscapes and Flemish and Dutch Schools. There is an entire floor dedicated to academic paintings that come from the merits of the nineteenth century. The ceilings of the vestibule and the grand staircase are decorated by Auvergne artist Riomois Alphonse Cornet. The ground floor has a display of pieces of goldsmith and ceramics and glassware contemporary that date from 1945 to today.

=== The second building (1983 restoration) ===
The second building has a collection that was given to the museum in 1979 by two Riomese donors: Marie-Joseph and Edouard Richard. It comprises antiques, including polychrome ceramics, small bronzes, jewels, Hellenistic marbles (Aphrodite, Artemis) and an extremely rare funeral portrait of Fayoum. There are also sculptures from the Middle Ages of Auvergene majesties of the 12th century and Child of Moulins of the 15th century. There are also Florentine paintings and Renaissance furniture. There are cabinets made of ebony and ivory that date back to the 17th century. A major portion of the collection is large amounts of goldsmithery including foreign pieces that are very high quality. There are also many Auvergne goblets, bowls and knives and some European weapons and armor from the 16th to 19th centuries.

== Collection ==
Ettore Sottsass, Andrea Branzi, Jean Nouvel, Goudji, Gae Aulenti and Olivier Gagnère are among the artists and designers whose works are housed in the museum.
