= Nanny McPhee =

2005 film by Kirk Jones

- Theatrical release poster
- Directed by: Kirk Jones
- Screenplay by: Emma Thompson
- Story by: Christianna Brand
- Based on: Nurse Matilda by Christianna Brand
- Produced by: Lindsay Doran; Tim Bevan; Eric Fellner
- Starring: Emma Thompson; Colin Firth; Kelly Macdonald; Derek Jacobi; Celia Imrie; Patrick Barlow; Imelda Staunton; Thomas Brodie-Sangster; Angela Lansbury
- Cinematography: Henry Braham
- Edited by: Justin Krish; Nick Moore
- Music by: Patrick Doyle
- Production companies: StudioCanal; Metro-Goldwyn-Mayer; Working Title Films; Three Strange Angels; Nanny McPhee Productions
- Distributed by: Universal Pictures (International) (Note: through United International Pictures); Mars Distribution (France)
- Release dates: 21 October 2005 (United Kingdom); 27 January 2006 (United States)
- Running time: 99 minutes
- Countries: United Kingdom; United States; France
- Language: English
- Budget: $25 million
- Box office: $123.3 million

Nanny McPhee is a 2005 comedy drama fantasy film directed by Kirk Jones, based on the Nurse Matilda character by Christianna Brand. Set in Victorian England in the 1860s, it stars Emma Thompson (who wrote the screenplay) as Nanny McPhee, along with Colin Firth, Kelly Macdonald, Derek Jacobi, Celia Imrie, Patrick Barlow, Imelda Staunton, Thomas Sangster and Angela Lansbury.

It was co-produced by StudioCanal, Metro-Goldwyn-Mayer Pictures, Working Title Films, Three Strange Angels, and Nanny McPhee Productions with music by Patrick Doyle, and produced by Lindsay Doran, Tim Bevan and Eric Fellner.

It was released theatrically on 21 October 2005 in the UK and on 27 January 2006 in the US by Universal Pictures. Thompson also scripted the film, which is adapted from Christianna Brand's Nurse Matilda books. The filming location was Penn House Estate in Buckinghamshire.

The film received generally positive reviews from critics and was grossing $123.3 million against a $25 million budget. A sequel, Nanny McPhee and the Big Bang, was released in 2010. A stage musical based on the film will open in 2027.

== Plot ==
In Victorian England, Cedric Brown, a widower undertaker, is the father of seven unruly children: 12-year-old Simon, 11-year-old Tora, 10-year-old Eric, 9-year-old Lily, 7-year-old Sebastian, 6-year-old Christianna ("Chrissie") and 1-year-old baby Agatha ("Aggie"). Cedric is a clumsy but good-natured person. However, since the death of his wife, he has spent little time with them and cannot control their unruly behaviour.

The children have had a series of seventeen nannies, whom they have systematically driven out with their misbehaviour and practical jokes. They also enjoy tormenting their cook, Mrs Blatherwick, a former military cook who declares that there will be "snow in August" before the family is put to rights. Besides their father, the only one the children will ever listen to is Evangeline, the family's illiterate but sweet-natured scullery maid.

One day, Cedric discovers multiple references for a "Nanny McPhee" throughout the home. That same night during a storm, while the children cause havoc in the kitchen, Cedric opens the front door to a mysterious woman who introduces herself as Nanny McPhee.

The children, led by Simon, try to play tricks on Nanny McPhee, but after she sees through their scheming, they gradually start to respect her and ask her for advice. Each time the children learn a lesson, one of Nanny McPhee's facial defects magically disappears. Over time, the children become more responsible, helping their long-suffering father in solving the family's problems, making Nanny McPhee less and less needed.

The family is supported financially by their domineering and short-sighted aunt, Lady Adelaide Stitch, who says that she will take custody of one of the children to make things easier for the family. She selects the second-youngest daughter, Chrissie, but Evangeline volunteers to go in her place and Adelaide agrees, assuming she is one of Cedric's daughters. She threatens to cut off her financial support for the family unless Cedric remarries within the month. Withdrawal of Adelaide's support would result in the family losing their house and being forcibly separated.

Desperate, Cedric turns to Mrs Selma Quickly, an unpleasant widow. The children assume from reading fairy tales that all stepmothers are terrible women who treat their stepchildren like slaves. Together, they sabotage Mrs Quickly's visit and she leaves, angry at Cedric. After the financial rationale for the marriage is explained to the children, they realise their mistake; the children appease Mrs Quickly by confessing they were to blame for ruining her visit. Mrs Quickly, intrigued when she hears about Adelaide's wealth and status, reconciles with Cedric and agrees to marry him.

However, at the garish wedding, Mrs Quickly begins to show her true colours as a potentially wicked stepmother, as the children originally feared. She breaks Aggie's beloved rattle, which was an heirloom inherited from their late mother. During the ceremony, the children pretend there are bees and start a food fight with the other guests using the banquet pastries. Cedric swiftly understands his children do not like the bride, and recognising that she is not right for him or his children, joins in the commotion himself. Mrs Quickly calls off the marriage and storms off in anger.

When it seems that Adelaide's marriage deadline is missed, and that she would discontinue her financial support for the family, Lily suggests Cedric should marry Evangeline; the other children reveal to Adelaide that she is not, in fact, their sister. Evangeline and Cedric resist at first, but then realise their true feelings for each other and agree to marry, satisfying Adelaide's conditions for maintaining her financial support but causing her to faint from shock upon realising that Cedric is marrying a scullery maid.

Nanny McPhee, now fully transformed into a beautiful woman, magically makes it snow in August (referencing Mrs Blatherwick's earlier comment), which turns the gaudy Quickly wedding scene into a beautiful winter wedding, and changes Evangeline's clothes into a wedding dress; the children happily accept Evangeline as their stepmother. After restoring Aggie's rattle, Nanny McPhee then leaves surreptitiously, in accordance with what she told the children on her first night: "When you need me, but do not want me, then I must stay. When you want me, but no longer need me, then I have to go."

== Cast ==
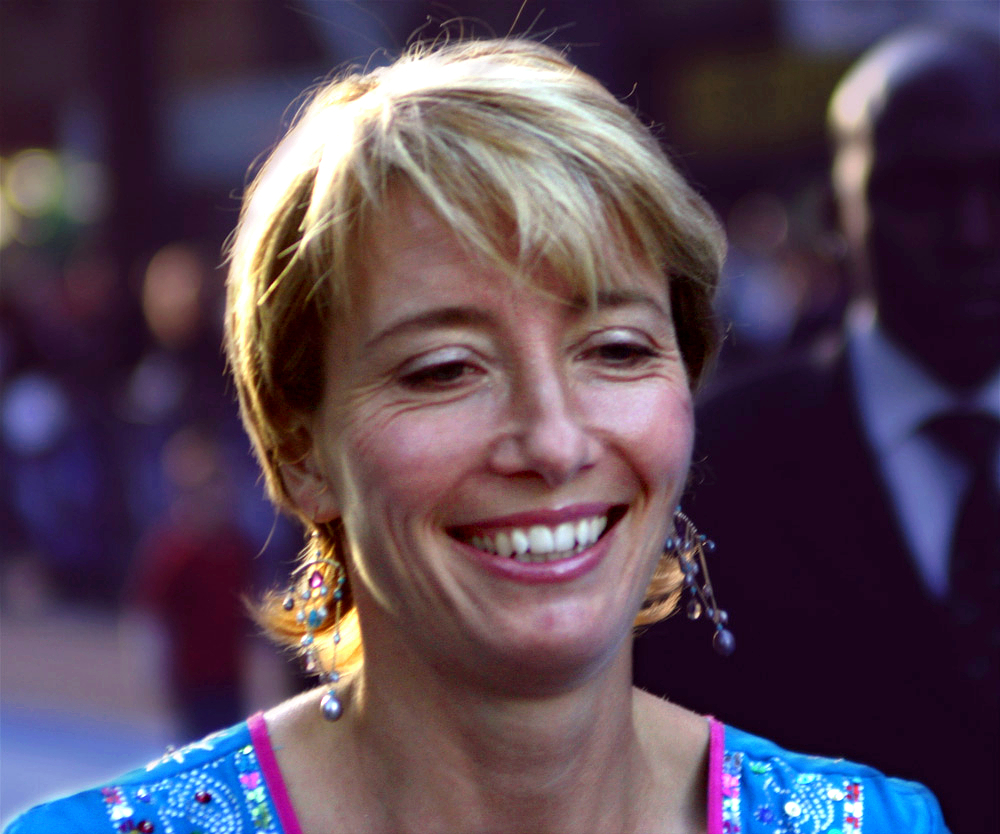
Emma Thompson at the film's premiere in 2005

- Emma Thompson as Nanny McPhee
- Colin Firth as Cedric Brown, an undertaker and the widower patriarch of the Brown family
- Thomas Sangster as Simon Brown, the eldest of the Brown children
- Kelly Macdonald as Evangeline, the Browns' scullery maid, who dreams of being an educated lady
- Angela Lansbury as Great-Aunt Lady Adelaide Stitch, the aunt of Cedric's late wife and the family's primary financial support
- Eliza Bennett as Tora Brown
- Raphaël Coleman as Eric Brown
- Jennifer Rae Daykin as Lily Brown
- Samuel Honywood as Sebastian Brown
- Holly Gibbs as Christianna "Chrissie" Brown
- Hebe and Zinnia Barnes play Agatha "Aggie" Brown, the youngest of the Brown children
  - Freya Fumic as the voice of Agatha Brown
- Celia Imrie as Mrs Selma Quickly, the main villain of the film; a frequent widow that Cedric intends to marry to appease Aunt Adelaide
- Imelda Staunton as Mrs Blatherwick, the Browns' military-minded cook
- Derek Jacobi as Mr Wheen, one of Cedric's co-workers
- Patrick Barlow as Mr Jowls, one of Cedric's co-workers
- Phyllida Law as the voice of Mrs Partridge
- Elizabeth Berrington as Letitia "Letty", Mrs Quickly's friend
- Adam Godley as the Vicar

== Production ==
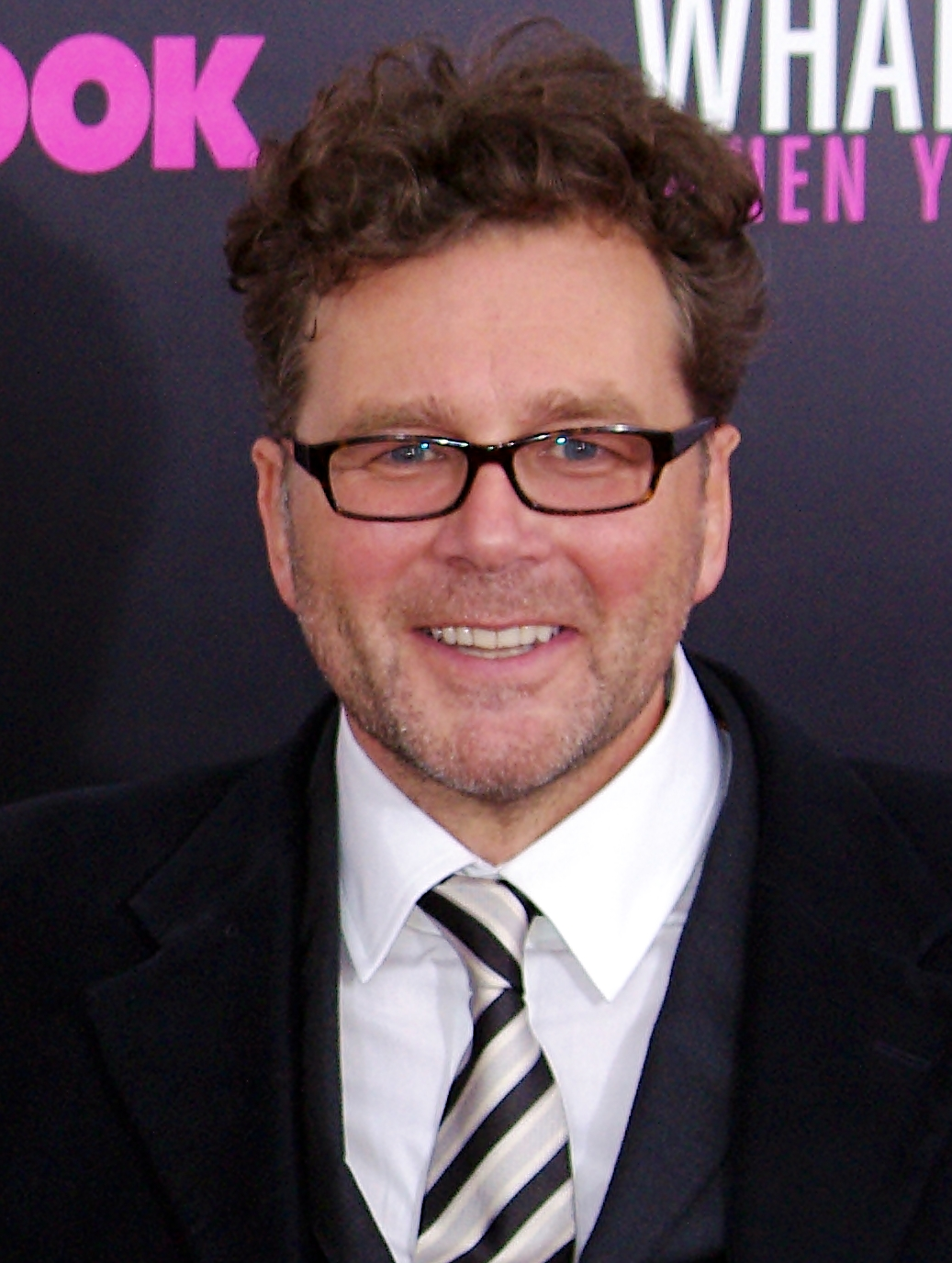
Director Kirk Jones

On 11 March 2002 Kirk Jones was hired and set to direct Nanny McPhee based on Nurse Matilda by Christianna Brand. Emma Thompson wrote the script for the film. Lindsay Doran, Tim Bevan and Eric Fellner produced the film with a budget of US$25 million for release in 2005.

During a BBC Newsnight interview in October 2017 with journalist Emily Maitlis, Emma Thompson revealed during the Weinstein scandal that Miramax Films initially owned the rights to Nurse Matilda which would later become Nanny McPhee alongside with Thompson. Thompson detailed that she had intense business clashes and "angry run-ins" with Harvey Weinstein due to his obstructive and bullying negotiations over the rights. These disputes led to the project moving away from Miramax, eventually led the film to go to Metro-Goldwyn-Mayer and then later on to Universal Pictures and Working Title Films.

On 22 April it was announced that Emma Thompson, Colin Firth, Thomas Sangster, Kelly Macdonald, Angela Lansbury, Eliza Bennett, Jennifer Rae Daykin, Raphaël Coleman, Samuel Honywood, Holly Gibbs, Celia Imrie, Imelda Staunton, Derek Jacobi, Patrick Barlow and Adam Godley joined the film.

On 16 May it was announced that Patrick Doyle would compose the music for the film. Development of the film was completed in Dorset, England. Filming ran from 1 April to 9 July 2004. The film reunites Emma Thompson, Colin Firth, Thomas Sangster and Adam Godley, who all previously starred in the 2003 film Love Actually. Thompson's work on this film prevented her from reprising her role as Frasier Crane's first wife, Nanny G., on his spin-off series, Frasier, in the episode "Caught in the Act", so Laurie Metcalf played Nanny G. in the episode.

== Release ==
The film was theatrically released on 21 October 2005 in the United Kingdom by Universal Pictures with a wider international release in the first quarter of 2006, including the United States on 27 January 2006.

=== Home media ===
Nanny McPhee was released in the UK on VHS and DVD on 13 February 2006 and in the US on DVD on 9 May 2006 by Universal Studios Home Entertainment.

== Reception ==
=== Critical response ===
Review aggregation website Rotten Tomatoes reports an approval rating of 74% based on 135 reviews, with an average rating of 6.7/10. The critical consensus reads, "A bit alarming at first, Nanny McPhee has a hard edge to counter Mary Poppins-style sweetness, but it still charms us and teaches some valuable lessons." Metacritic calculated an average score of 59 out of 100 based on 30 reviews, indicating "mixed or average reviews". Audiences polled by CinemaScore gave the film an average grade of "A−" on an A+ to F scale.

=== Box office ===
The film was grossing $122,489,822 — $47,144,110 in the United States and Canada and $75,345,712 elsewhere. It opened in the United Kingdom on 21 October 2005 and finished at number two at the box office with an opening weekend gross of £2.6 million ($4.5 million) from 427 screens. It opened in the United States and Canada on 27 January 2006 with an opening weekend total of $14,503,650 from 1,995 theatres (an average of $7,270 per theatre) also ranking at number two at the box office, behind the Martin Lawrence film Big Momma's House 2.

== Sequel ==
Emma Thompson revealed on Friday Night with Jonathan Ross that two more films were planned. The second film, Nanny McPhee and the Big Bang (also called Nanny McPhee Returns), was released in March 2010. It co-stars Rhys Ifans, Maggie Smith, Ralph Fiennes and Maggie Gyllenhaal. The character of Aggie Brown returns as the now elderly Mrs Docherty. In it, Nanny McPhee takes charge of the children of a woman whose husband has gone to war.

A third film was planned to be set in modern-day Britain but, despite taking $93,000,000 at the box-office, the sequel did not reach studio expectations and plans were cancelled. In August 2018, on The Chris Evans Breakfast Show on BBC Radio 2, Thompson confirmed that she had written a script for a third film, but that the studio thought it was too expensive to make, given the sequel's perceived underperformance.

== Stage musical ==
It was announced on 12 April 2018 that the film would be adapted into a stage musical, with The New Yorker reporting in November 2022 that it was scheduled to open in the West End in 2023. On 27 August 2026, it was announced that the musical will open in summer 2027 at a theatre to be announced.
