= Death of Jezebel =

1948 novel

- First edition
- Author: Christianna Brand
- Language: English
- Series: Inspector Cockrill
- Genre: Mystery
- Publisher: Bodley Head
- Publication date: 1948
- Publication place: United Kingdom
- Media type: Print
- Preceded by: Suddenly at His Residence
- Followed by: London Particular

Death of Jezebel is a 1948 mystery crime novel by the British author Christianna Brand. It is the fourth entry in the series featuring the fictional police detective Inspector Cockerill, and sees him working alongside Inspector Charlesworth a character from Brand's debut novel Death in High Heels.

== Synopsis ==
Isabel Drew, a beautiful and arrogant actress, has widely been known as Jezebel since she drove her best friend's fiancé to kill himself. While performing in a medieval extravaganza in London she and other cast members receive letters threatening to kill them.

== Bibliography ==
- Bargainnier, Earl F. & Dove George N. Cops and Constables: American and British Fictional Policemen. Popular Press, 1986.
- Gaines, Janet Howe . Music in the Old Bones: Jezebel Through the Ages. SIU Press, 1999.
- Reilly, John M. Twentieth Century Crime & Mystery Writers. Springer, 2015.
