= Green for Danger =

1944 novel

- First edition (UK)
- Author: Christianna Brand
- Language: English
- Series: Inspector Cockrill
- Genre: Crime
- Publisher: The Bodley Head (UK); Dodd, Mead (US)
- Publication date: 1944
- Publication place: United Kingdom
- Media type: Print (Hardback & Paperback)
- Pages: 199 pg
- Preceded by: Heads You Lose
- Followed by: Suddenly at His Residence

Green for Danger is a popular 1944 detective novel by British writer Christianna Brand, praised for its clever plot, interesting characters, and wartime hospital setting. It was made into a 1946 film which is regarded by film historians as one of the greatest screen adaptations of a Golden Age mystery novel.

== Plot summary ==
A murder takes place in a rural military British hospital in Kent during the WWII Blitz, when survivors of the bombings were being brought in for surgery. Inspector Cockrill is tasked to determine whodunit when the head nurse is killed after revealing that the death of a patient under anesthesia was no accident. There are six suspects, nurses and doctors who were present during the operation. After another murder attempt leaves a nurse dangerously ill, he re-stages the operation, risking the life of another patient, in order to unmask the murderer.
