= Heads You Lose (novel) =

1941 novel

- First edition
- Author: Christianna Brand
- Language: English
- Series: Inspector Cockrill
- Genre: Crime
- Publisher: The Bodley Head
- Publication date: 1941
- Publication place: United Kingdom
- Media type: Print
- Followed by: Green for Danger

Heads You Lose is a 1941 crime mystery novel by the British writer Christianna Brand. It was her second novel following her successful debut Death in High Heels and the first to feature Inspector Cockrill of the Kent Police Force.

== Synopsis ==
Cockrill is called in to a country house in wartime Britain where two murders are committed amongst several guests of the local squire.

== Bibliography ==
- Walton, Samantha. Guilty But Insane: Mind and Law in Golden Age Detective Fiction. Oxford University Press, 2015.
