= Death of a Dude =

1969 novel by Rex Stout

- Author: Rex Stout
- Cover artist: S. A. Summit
- Language: English
- Series: Nero Wolfe
- Genre: Detective fiction
- Publisher: Viking Press
- Publication date: August 20, 1969
- Publication place: United States
- Media type: Print (Hardcover)
- Pages: 180 pp. (first edition)
- OCLC: 29338
- Preceded by: The Father Hunt
- Followed by: Please Pass the Guilt

Death of a Dude is a Nero Wolfe detective novel by Rex Stout, published by the Viking Press in 1969.

== Plot introduction ==
Archie Goodwin is part of a house party at Lily Rowan's vacation home in Montana when a murder brings Nero Wolfe from New York to take a hand. Uniquely for a Nero Wolfe novel, it takes place entirely away from the brownstone on West 35th Street. (Some Buried Caesar came close, but returned to the brownstone for a brief coda; Too Many Cooks similarly came very close, but includes a brief description of the departure from the brownstone, including the good-byes from Fritz, Saul and Theodore.)

== Summary ==
While on vacation at Lily Rowan's Montana beef ranch, Archie Goodwin becomes involved in a murder investigation. Harvey Greve, the ranch manager, has been accused of the murder of Philip Brodell, a wealthy "dude" on vacation at a neighbouring ranch. The previous year, Brodell had seduced and impregnated Greve's daughter, and Greve had sworn revenge; however both Archie and Lily are skeptical of his guilt. Brodell was shot twice, once in the back, by an inexpert marksman; as well as Greve being an excellent shot, Archie is convinced that he is too honorable to shoot an unarmed opponent in the back. However, the local sheriff, Morley Haight, has only lazily investigated the murder before settling on Greve's guilt in large part due to a bitter grudge between the two.

Archie himself suspects the Sheriff's son Gilbert, who had been wooing Greve's daughter and had himself threatened to murder Brodell, but as an outsider himself Archie is having difficulty in persuading the distrustful, hostile locals to open up to him. Despite the difficulties, Archie's honor will not allow him to abandon Greve to his plight, and he writes to Nero Wolfe informing him that he will be taking an extended leave while he tries to clear Greve's name. Irritated at the interruptions to his routine that this causes, Wolfe uses a high-ranking contact in the Montana state government to research the case before taking the almost unprecedented step of leaving his home and travelling to Montana to consult with Archie in person. Convinced by Archie's argument, Wolfe decides to solve the case to enable Archie and himself to return to New York. He stays at Lily's ranch along Archie and her other guests; Diana Kadany, an actress friend of Lily's, and Wade Worthy, an author writing a biography of Lily's father.

Wolfe gets in touch with the local county attorney, Thomas Jessup, and convinces him to appoint himself and Archie as public investigators. Jessup, a rival to Sheriff Haight and himself skeptical of the investigation, agrees to do so, and having official status means that the locals are no longer able to ignore or dismiss their investigation. They subsequently learn that Gilbert Haight has a strong alibi proving he was unable to have committed the murder, but that there were numerous points of friction and tension between Brodell and the fellow guests and employees at the ranch he was staying at that a competent investigation should have uncovered. In particular, Wolfe and Archie agree that one cowhand, Sam Peacock, knows more than he is letting on about the crime. They attempt to meet and interview him at a local dance but are stymied by Sheriff Haight, resentful at Wolfe's undermining of his authority.

When leaving the dance, however, Wolfe and Archie discover Peacock's dead body hidden in their car. Haight takes the opportunity to arrest Archie and Wolfe, but with Jessup's intervention Wolfe is placed under house arrest. While Archie is imprisoned, Wolfe orders Saul Panzer to travel to St. Louis, Brodell's home town, to investigate any possible connections between Brodell and the other out-of-towners in the area. When Archie is released, Wolfe reveals to his fellow guests that he has learned from Saul Panzer that a photo of one of the out-of-towners was recognised as Carl Yaeger, a man suspected of strangling a young woman but who fled before he could be apprehended. He then suggests to Lily and Diana that they spend the afternoon fishing, implicitly identifying Wade Worthy as Yaeger; Brodell had recognised Worthy as Yaeger and Worthy/Yaeger had murdered him to keep his secret, but was forced to also murder Peacock when learning that Brodell had passed this information on to him.

When Wolfe reveals that a St. Louis detective is arriving in town to arrest him, Worthy/Yaeger flees—just as Wolfe planned. When Sheriff Haight and the St. Louis detective arrive at Lily's ranch to arrest Worthy/Yaeger, Wolfe reveals that he has previously arranged with Jessup and the state police to have him apprehended away from Lily's ranch in order to spare his host the embarrassment and ignominy of having a murderer taken into custody from her home, to thank Jessup for his help and to humiliate Haight in retribution for his inept investigation and spiteful treatment of himself and Archie. Worthy/Yaeger is apprehended and Harvey Greve is released from custody, allowing Wolfe and Archie to return to New York.

== Publication history ==
- 1969, New York: The Viking Press, August 20, 1969, hardcover

In his limited-edition pamphlet, Collecting Mystery Fiction #10, Rex Stout's Nero Wolfe Part II, Otto Penzler describes the first edition of Death of a Dude: "Blue boards, dark blue cloth spine; front and rear covers blank; spine printed with green, blue, and white lettering. Issued in a mainly black pictorial dust wrapper."
In April 2006, Firsts: The Book Collector's Magazine estimated that the first edition of Death of a Dude had a value of between $100 and $200. The estimate is for a copy in very good to fine condition in a like dustjacket.

- 1969, New York: Viking (Mystery Guild), October 1969, hardcover

The far less valuable Viking book club edition may be distinguished from the first edition in three ways:

- The dust jacket has "Book Club Edition" printed on the inside front flap, and the price is absent (first editions may be price clipped if they were given as gifts).
- Book club editions are sometimes thinner and always taller (usually a quarter of an inch) than first editions.
- Book club editions are bound in cardboard, and first editions are bound in cloth (or have at least a cloth spine).

- 1969, Canadian Magazine (abridged), November 1969
- 1970, London: Collins Crime Club, April 13, 1970, hardcover
- 1970, New York: Bantam #S-5487, August 1970, paperback
- 1972, London: Fontana #2673, 1972, paperback
- 1972, London: Book Club Associates, 1972
- 1995, New York: Bantam Books ISBN 0-553-76295-8 January 2, 1995, paperback
- 2000, Newport Beach, California: Books on Tape, Inc. ISBN 0-7366-5084-9 April 19, 2000, audio cassette (unabridged, read by Michael Prichard)
- 2010, New York: Bantam ISBN 978-0-307-75587-2 May 12, 2010, e-book

== The unfamiliar word ==
"Nero Wolfe talks in a way that no human being on the face of the earth has ever spoken, with the possible exception of Rex Stout after he had a gin and tonic," said Michael Jaffe, executive producer of the A&E TV series, A Nero Wolfe Mystery. "Readers of the Wolfe saga often have to turn to the dictionary because of the erudite vocabulary of Wolfe and sometimes of Archie," wrote Rev. Frederick G. Gotwald.

Nero Wolfe's vocabulary is one of the hallmarks of the character. Examples of unfamiliar words — or unfamiliar uses of words that some would otherwise consider familiar — are found throughout the corpus, often in the give-and-take between Wolfe and Archie.

- Punctilio, chapter 5.
- Plerophory, chapter 6. Plerophory also appears in the first chapter of Some Buried Caesar, published three decades earlier.
