= Lynn Harrison =

English film and TV editor

- Born: Eric Lyndhurst Harrison; 2 Nov 1907; Horwich, Lancashire, England
- Died: July 12, 1967 (aged 59); Los Angeles, California, USA
- Occupation: Film editor

Lynn Harrison (1907-1967) was an award-winning English film a TV editor who worked in Hollywood from the 1930s through the 1960s.

== Selected filmography ==
- Sleep, My Love (1948)
- Stork Bites Man (1947)
- The Adventures of Don Coyote (1947)
- Susie Steps Out (1946)
- Little Iodine (1946)
- Old Iron (1938)
- Second Best Bed (1938)
- The Lilac Domino (1937)
- Forbidden Music (1936)
