= The Picnic at Sakkara =

1954 novel by P.H. Newby

- First edition
- Author: P. H. Newby
- Language: English
- Genre: Fiction
- Published: 1955
- Publisher: Jonathan Cape
- Publication place: UK
- Pages: 239

The Picnic at Sakkara is a 1955 novel by P. H. Newby. It is about a lecturer at Cairo University, Edgar Perry, during the rule of King Farouk. He becomes tutor to a pasha, and is swept into a conflict between Western ways and the Moslem Brotherhood. It is a comedic novel. It is the first novel of the Anglo-Egyptian comic trilogy, the others being Revolution and Roses (1957) and A Guest and His Going (1960).

== Reception ==
Anthony Thwaite called it "wonderful", and said that it was Newby's "most successful and memorable achievement." Kirkus Reviews, however, found it to be "idiosyncratic" and an acquired taste.
