= Goudji =

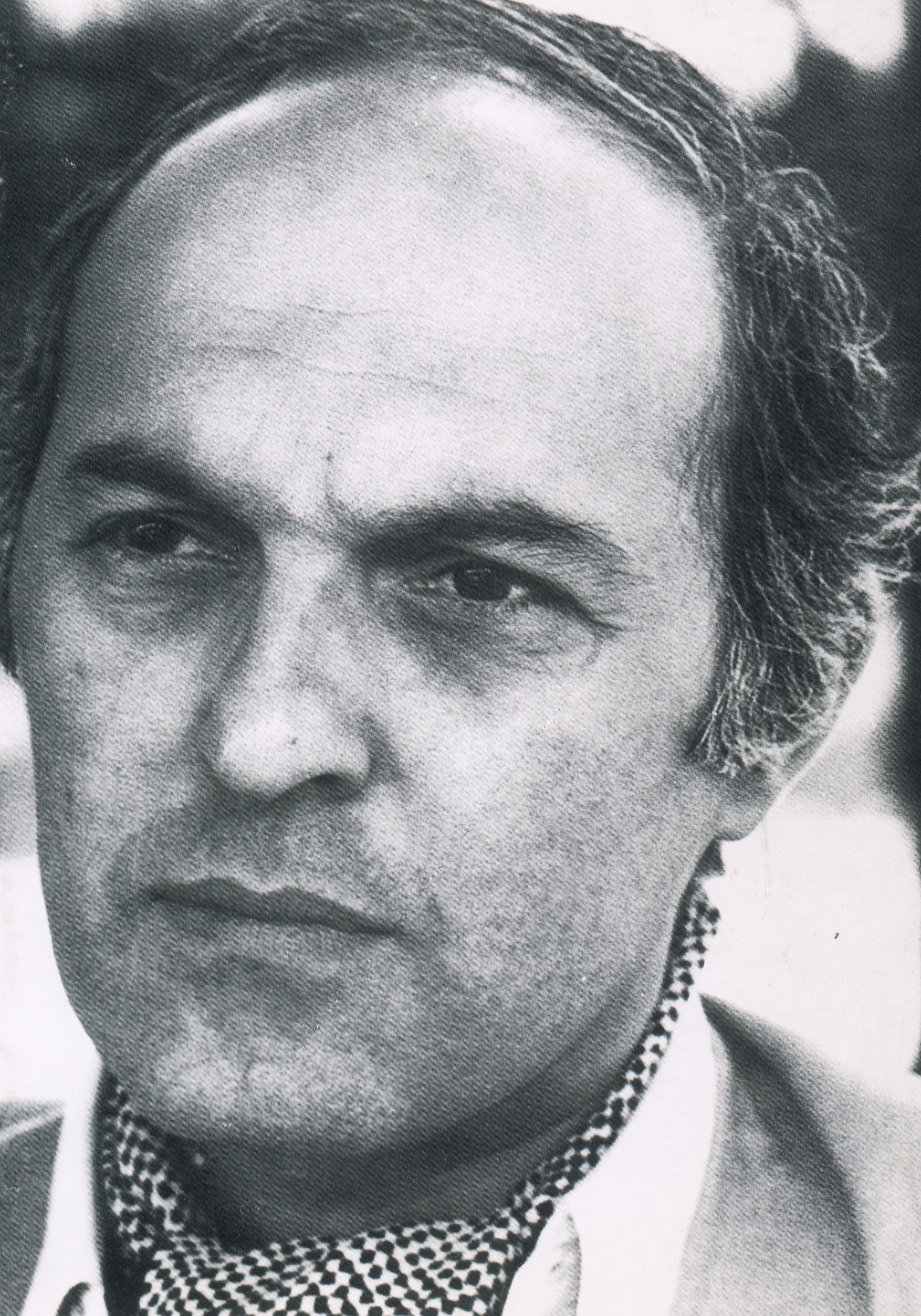
Goudji

Goudji Amashukeli (Georgian: ელგუჯა "გუჯი" ამაშუკელი; born 6 July 1941) is a French sculptor and goldsmith of Georgian origin who was born in Soviet Georgia.

== Biography ==
Goudji was born in Borjomi and spent his youth in Batumi with his family. His father was a doctor and his mother was a Professor of natural science. He had an elder brother, by two years. He studied sculpture at the Art school of Tbilisi between 1958 and 1962. He left Georgia in 1962 for Moscow, where he started a career as a sculptor, while dreaming of becoming a goldsmith.

In 1969 he married Katherine Barsacq who worked at the French embassy in Moscow. He moved to France in January 1974 after five years of personal intervention on his behalf by President Georges Pompidou. He became a French naturalized citizen in 1978. In Paris he made jewelry and decorative objects for art galleries.

== Artworks ==
His artwork combines the technique of the tinsmith with hard stone incrustations in metal. His first work consisted of brooches and torques. He then went on to create kantharos cups, aquamaniles, rhytons, pyxides, and animal figures. He hammers thin sheets of metal.

In 1976 he created the academician's sword for Félicien Marceau. He has created other swords for Hélène Carrère d'Encausse, Raymond Barre and Maurice Allais.

His works are exhibited in art galleries and museums, in France and abroad. They have been offered by the French Presidents of the Republic, François Mitterrand, Jacques Chirac or Nicolas Sarkozy, to Foreign Presidents.

The majority of the civil pieces are preserved in private collections. Several museums have some: Museum of decorative Arts of Paris, Mandet Museum of Riom, Dobrée Museum of Nantes, Museum of decorative Arts of Lyon, Museum of the Castle of Blois in France, Kunsthaus Dr. Hartl in Freising in Bavaria or Vatican Museums.

== Liturgical work ==
In 1985 he created a Baptismal Font and a Pascal candlestick for the Abbey of Epau and the National Committee of Sacred Art, which now resides in the Notre Dame de Paris.

Between 1992 and 1996 he designed twenty five works for the Notre-Dame Cathedral of Chartres, all registered in the Inventory of Patrimony. In 2008 he created twenty-five new works (sacred vessels, candlesticks, ciboire), which make Chartres's collection one of the most important collection of Goudji liturgical works in France.

He has provided work for several cathedrals, abbeys and churches: Luçon Cathedral (1995); Abbey of St Philibert at Tournus (1999) La Trappe Abbey of Soligny (2000), Saint-Pierre de Champagne on the Rhone (2000); the Cambrai Cathedral (2003), the Abbey ND of Belleville in Beaujolais wine (2004); Friburg (2004); the Basilica Sainte Clotilde (2007) in Paris. He creates baptismal fonts: Notre-Dame de Paris (1986), Saint-Jean de Montmartre (2007), Saint-Pierre de Champagne, of large monstrances of procession: Lourdes, Puy in Velay, sticks of abbot and bishop: abbot of Saint-Maurice de Clervaux (1994), abbot of Triors (1996), Champagne abbot on the Rhone (2000), Mgr Jean-Louis Bruguès (Rome), Mgr Herve Giraud (Soissons), reliquaries: Abbey of Sept-Fons (1998), St Philibert at Tournus, Cathedral of Cahors (2002), the crowns of light: St Philibert at Tournus (2002), collegial Saint-Liphard of Meung-sur-Loire (2004), eucharistic doves: Chartres, Blois, Vendôme, chalices: Notre Dame du Haut de Ronchamp.

In 1999 he produced the reliquary of Padre Pio, a gift of the Minor Brothers Capuchins to the pope John Paul II on the occasion of the beatification of Padre Pio. The Pope carried this on his cape at the opening of the holy door of St Peter's Basilica of Rome. Other works for the Minor Brothers include sacred vessels, the cross of procession, the monstrance, the lantern, the censer and its shuttle with incense, as well as the cover of the "évangéliaire". In 2008 Goudji created the crystal mounting of the reliquary for the translation of the saint on April 24, 2008 in San Giovanni Rotondo in Pouilles in Italy.

== Bibliography ==
- 1987, Goudji, par Malcolm Lakin et Théo Kok, Préface de Janine Rensch, Textes de Félicien Marceau et François Mathey, Editions ASB Gallery, Londres
- 1989, Goudji, par François Mathey, Editions Galerie Claude Bernard, Paris
- 1991, Goudji, orfèvre contemporain, par Marie-Josée Linou, Editions Musée Mandet de Riom
- 1991, Goudji, Textes de Goudji et de François Mathey, Editions Galerie Claude Bernard, Paris
- 1992, Goudji, sculpteur-orfèvre, par Graham Hughes, Edition "The Fine Art Society, London, in association with ASB, Zürich"
- 1993, De pierre, de métal et de feu, Goudji, orfèvre contemporain, par Jacques Santrot, Préface de Robert Turcan, Editions Musée Thomas Dobrée de Nantes
- 1993, Goudji, par Marc Hérissé, Préface de Félicien Marceau, Editions de l'Amateur, Paris
- 1993, Goudji au Louvre, par Michel Laclotte, et Jacques Santrot, Réunion des Musées Nationaux, RMN, Paris
- 1993, Goudji, par Jean Paget, Editions Galerie Claude Bernard, Paris
- 1993, Goudji, Histoire d'un art, par Jacques Santrot, Kunsthaus Dc Hartl, Freising
- 1999, Goudji, par Stéphane Barsacq, Galerie Capazza, Nancay
- 1999, Goudji, orfèvre, par Chantal Fernex de Mongex et Stéphane Barsacq, Editions Musée des Beaux-Arts de Chambéry
- 2002, Goudji, Stéphane Barsacq, Bernard Berthod, Préface d'Hélène Carrère d'Encausse, Editions de l'Amateur, Paris
- 2007, Goudji, le magicien d’or, Jacques Santrot, Préface de Daniel Rondeau, Postface d'Elisabeth Latrémolière, Editions Gourcuff & Gradenigro, Paris
- 2011, Goudji, des mains d’or et de feu, par Salah Stétié, Lucien Jerphagnon, Bernard Berthod, Manuelle Anne Renault-Langlois, Éditions Thalia, Paris

== Rewards ==
- Commandeur de l'Ordre des Arts et des Lettres
- Chevalier de la Légion d'honneur
- Chevalier de l'Ordre national du Mérite
- Knight of the Order of the Holy Sepulchre (2003)
- Knight of the Order of St. Gregory the Great (2007)
- Elected at the Académie catholique de France (2009)
- Elected at Order of the Golden Fleece (Georgia) (2012)
- Chanoine d'honneur de la cathédrale de Chartres (2017)
