= Second Best Bed =

- Directed by: Tom Walls
- Written by: Ben Travers
- Produced by: Max Schach
- Starring: Tom Walls; Jane Baxter; Veronica Rose
- Cinematography: Jack E. Cox
- Edited by: Lynn Harrison
- Music by: Van Phillips
- Production company: Capitol Film Corporation
- Distributed by: General Film Distributors
- Release date: January 1938
- Running time: 74 minutes
- Country: United Kingdom
- Language: English

Second Best Bed is a 1938 British comedy film directed by Tom Walls and starring Walls, Jane Baxter and Veronica Rose. The screenplay was by Ben Travers, based on an earlier story of his, and concerns a newly married couple who soon run into domestic difficulties when the wife refuses to obey her husband's every order.

== Cast ==
- Tom Walls as Victor Garnett
- Jane Baxter as Patricia Lynton
- Veronica Rose as Jenny Murdoch
- Carl Jaffe as Georges Dubonnet
- Greta Gynt as Yvonne
- Edward Lexy as Murdoch
- Tyrell Davis as Whittaker
- Mae Bacon as Mrs Whittaker
- Ethel Coleridge as Mrs Knuckle
- Davy Burnaby as Lord Kingston
- Martita Hunt as Mrs Mather
- Gordon James as Judge
- Charlotte Leigh as Miss Boolbread
- Denier Warren as umpire
- Peter Bull as tennis match spectator

== Production ==
It was an independent production made at Shepperton Studios with sets were designed by the art director Walter Murton. Walls and Travers had worked together on the Aldwych farces.

== Reception ==
The Monthly Film Bulletin wrote: "Written by Ben Travers in characteristic vein the story is developed with daring and risqué dialogue and a full quota of double entendres. 'The situations are equally piquant, and leave little to the imagination. It must be admitted that Tom Walls as director shows skill and agility in skating over the thinnest possible ice, while as star he gets across outrageous remarks with a disarming urbanity and adroitness. He is, undoubtedly, in his element, and gives a finished and effective performance. Both Jane Baxter and Veronica Rose support him ably, and small part players are thoroughly competent."

Kine Weekly wrote: "Breezy up-to-date marital comedy featuring Tom Walls in a made-to-measure role. The humour, which is from the pen of Ben Travers, is not exactly kindergarten, but in spite of occasional ribaldry the fun seldom fails to strike a popular note. The star contributes a characteristic performance in the lead, the feminine co-stars contrast effectively, and the support is well up to standard."

Leslie Halliwell wrote "Cheerful star comedy with a touch of sophistication."
