= Armin Kõomägi =

Estonian writer and screenwriter

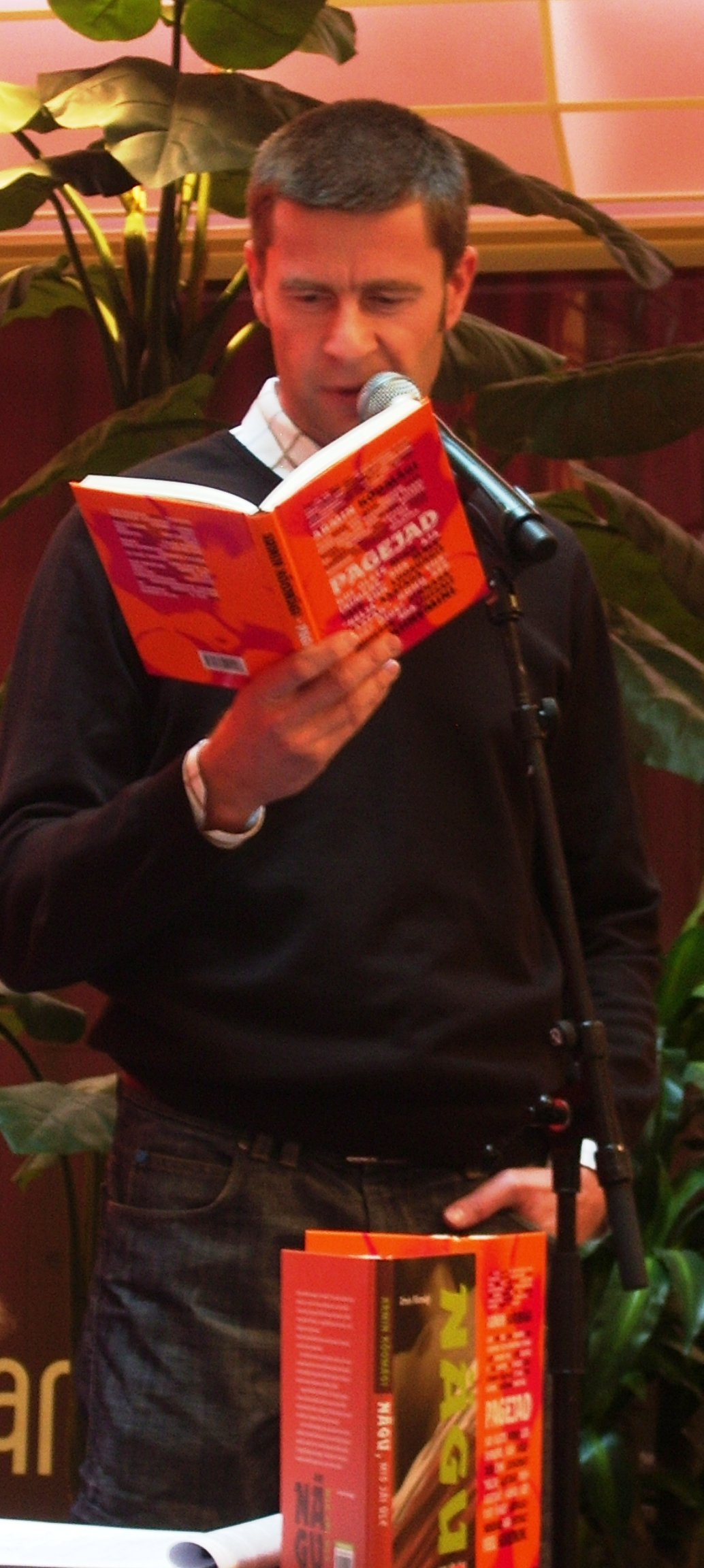
- Born: 5 July 1969 (age 57)

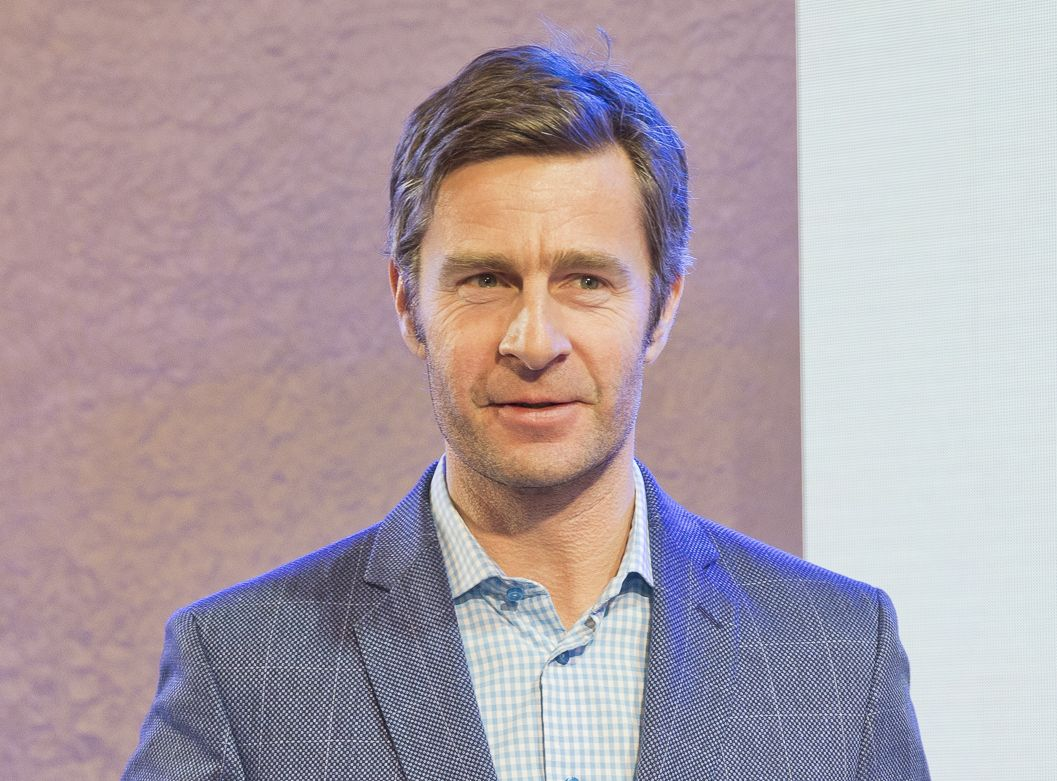
Armin Kõomägi (2018)

Armin Kõomägi (born 5 July 1969) is an Estonian writer and screenwriter. He is an author of six books, including two novels and four collections of short stories.

== Life ==
Armin Kõomägi was born on July 5, 1969, in Moldova, to an Armenian mother and an Estonian father. He is an Estonian writer

== Literary career ==
Kõomägi started writing in 2003 when he was thirty-four.

His first book, published in 2005, was a collection of short stories titled Amatöör (Amateur). A short story from this collection, Anonüümsed Logistikud (Logisticians Anonymous), was awarded the Friedebert Tuglas Short Story Award in 2006 and made into a movie in 2008. In 2006 he published another collection of short stories titled Nägu, mis jäi üle (The Face That Was Left Over). This was followed in 2009 by his first novel Pagejad (Runaways), and in 2011 by his second novel Hea Firma (The Good Firm).

In 2012, Kõomägi contributed to the Dalkey Archive Press published Best European Fiction 2012, which contains a collection of new fiction from European writers.

In 2015, Kõomägi won the Estonian Writers' Union's novel competition with his manuscript for Lui Vutoon.

== Bibliography ==
- Amatöör (Amateur) (2005)
- Nägu, mis jäi üle (The Face That Was Left Over) (2005)
- Pagejad (Runaways) (2009)
- Hea Firma (The Good Firm) (2011)
- Best European Fiction 2012 (2012)
- Lui Vutoon (2015)
