= P. H. Newby =

English writer and broadcasting administrator (1918–1997)

P. H. Newby CBE
- Born: Percy Howard Newby; 25 June 1918; Crowborough, Sussex, England
- Died: 6 September 1997 (aged 79); Garsington, England
- Education: Hanley Castle Grammar School; St Paul's College of Education
- Occupations: Author, managing director of BBC Radio
- Writing career
- Notable work: Something to Answer For (1968)
- Notable awards: Somerset Maugham Prize (1948); Booker Prize (1969)

Percy Howard Newby CBE (25 June 1918 – 6 September 1997) was an English novelist and broadcasting administrator. He was the first winner of the Booker Prize, his novel Something to Answer For having received the inaugural award in 1969.

== Early life ==
Newby was born in Crowborough, Sussex, England, on 25 June 1918 and was educated at Hanley Castle Grammar School in Worcestershire, and St Paul's College of Education in Cheltenham. In October 1939, he was sent to France to serve in World War II as a private in the Royal Army Medical Corps. His unit was one of the last to be evacuated. Afterwards, he was sent to the Middle East and served in the Egyptian desert.

== Career ==
Newby was released from military service in December 1942, and then taught English Literature at King Fouad University in Cairo until 1946. One of his students was the Egyptian editor Mursi Saad El-Din.

From 1949 to 1978, Newby was employed by the BBC, beginning as a radio producer and going on to become successively Controller of the Third Programme and Radio 3, Director of Programmes (Radio), and finally managing director, BBC Radio. While at Radio 3, Newby is credited with increasing the amount of Classical music on the station without the need for controversial changes to schedules.

His first novel, A Journey into the Interior, was published in 1946. He then returned to England to write. In the same year, he was given an Atlantic Award in literature, and two years later he received the Somerset Maugham Prize for his novel Mariner Dances. In 1947, John Lehmann published Newby's boys' adventure story "The Spirit of Jem" with 41-line drawings and a colour dust wrap by Keith Vaughan.

In 1969, Newby won the inaugural Booker Prize with his novel Something to Answer For.

In 1972, Newby was appointed a Commander of the Order of the British Empire (CBE) for his work as managing director of BBC Radio.

In his obituary author, friend and colleague Anthony Thwaite states: "P. H. Newby was one of the best English novelists of the second half of the century."

== Works ==
=== Novels ===
- A Journey to the Interior (1945)
- The Spirit of Jem (1947)
- Agents and Witnesses (1947)
- Mariner Dances (1948)
- The Loot Runners (1949)
- The Snow Pasture (1949)
- The Young May Moon (1950)
- A Season in England (1951)
- A Step to Silence (1952)
- The Retreat (1953)
- Picnic at Sakkara (1955), first novel in the Anglo-Egyptian comic trilogy.
- Revolution and Roses (1957), second novel in the Anglo-Egyptian comic trilogy.
- Ten Miles From Anywhere (1958). Short stories.
- A Guest and His Going (1960), third novel in the Anglo-Egyptian comic trilogy.
- The Barbary Light (1962)
- One of the Founders (1965)
- Something to Answer For (1968)
- A Lot to Ask (1973)
- Kith (1977)
- Feelings Have Changed (1981)
- Leaning in the Wind (1986)
- Coming in with the Tide (1991)
- Something About Women (1995)

=== Non-fiction ===
- Maria Edgeworth (1950)
- The Novel, 1945–1950 (1951)
- The Uses of Broadcasting (1978)
- The Egypt Story (1979)
- Warrior Pharaohs (1980)
- Saladin in His Time (1983)
