= Creezy =

1969 novel by Félicien Marceau

- Author: Félicien Marceau
- Translator: J. A. Underwood
- Language: French
- Publisher: Éditions Gallimard
- Publication date: 27 March 1969
- Publication place: France
- English publication date: 1970
- Pages: 196

Creezy is a 1969 novel by the French writer Félicien Marceau. It tells the story of a young and wealthy Paris model nicknamed Creezy—derived into French slang from the English word "crazy"—who has an affair with an older, married man, as the two of them engineer practical jokes, make love and travel around Europe. It was published in English in 1970, translated by J. A. Underwood.

The book received the Prix Goncourt. It was adapted into a 1974 film also titled Creezy, directed by Pierre Granier-Deferre and starring Sydne Rome alongside Alain Delon.

== Reception ==
Laurent LeSage wrote in The Saturday Review: "With its hackneyed plot and not very sympathetic people, this novel, were it not for the genuine literary talent of Felicien Marceau, might be just another best-seller. Through the magic of style he has brought all its elements together to produce the impression of a frighteningly mechanical universe in which mankind itself has become a sort of souped-up machine. ... I should guess that writing a novel so dramatically contemporary represents for Felicien Marceau a real tour de force, an accomplishment which only his recent successes in the theater could have prepared him for."
