= Court of Foxes =

1969 novel

- First edition
- Author: Christianna Brand
- Cover artist: Val Biro
- Language: English
- Genre: Historical adventure
- Publisher: Michael Joseph
- Publication date: 1969
- Publication place: United Kingdom
- Media type: Print

Court of Foxes is a 1969 historical adventure romance novel by the British writer Christianna Brand. During the late eighteenth century, celebrated London society lady Marchesa Marigelda operates a double life as a highwayman. It marked a change of genre for Brand who is best known for her murder mysteries.

== Bibliography ==
- Macdonald, Gina. British Mystery and Thriller Writers Since 1960. Gale Group, 2003.
- Reilly, John M. Twentieth Century Crime & Mystery Writers. Springer, 2015.
