= Elsa Tee =

British actress (1917–2006)

Elsa Tee (1917–2006) was a British actress.

== Selected filmography ==
- Heaven Is Round the Corner (1944)
- Twilight Hour (1944)
- Here Comes the Sun (1946)
- Death in High Heels (1947)
- School for Randle (1949)
