= Nurse Matilda =

Christianna Brand children's book series

- Nurse Matilda; Nurse Matilda Goes to Town; Nurse Matilda Goes to Hospital
- Author: Christianna Brand
- Illustrator: Edward Ardizzone
- Country: UK
- Language: English
- Publisher: Brockhampton Press
- Published: 1964–1974
- No. of books: 3

The Nurse Matilda books were written by the British author Christianna Brand and illustrated by her cousin, Edward Ardizzone. The books are based on stories told to the cousins by their great-grandfather.

The books centre on Nurse Matilda, a witch described as extremely ugly, who is recommended to Mr. and Mrs. Brown by several agencies as a nursemaid. Upon arriving at the Brown household, she becomes nanny to the family's large number of children. The children are portrayed as exceptionally badly behaved, having driven away numerous previous governesses through their mischievous antics — until Nurse Matilda arrives. She gradually teaches the children to behave and also manages the difficult Great Aunt Adelaide Stitch. By the conclusion, the children have reformed and Nurse Matilda departs to take charge of another unruly family.

In the sequels, the children revert to their wicked ways, and the distressed Mr. and Mrs. Brown have no other choice but to send for Nurse Matilda again.

In the second book, the children are sent to live with their domineering Great Aunt Adelaide in her London manor. In the third and final book, they are whisked away to the hospital following a prank that has gone wrong.

== Books ==
Nurse Matilda's first appearance in print was in an anthology of children's stories collected by Christianna Brand:

- Brand, Christianna (compiled by), Naughty Children (London: Victor Gollancz Limited, 1962), also illustrated by Edward Ardizzone

The three subsequent Nurse Matilda stories, all published by Brockhampton Press, were:

1. Nurse Matilda (1964)
2. Nurse Matilda Goes to Town (1967)
3. Nurse Matilda Goes to Hospital (1974)

The three stories were also published by Bloomsbury in a 3 volume slipcased edition in 2005.

== Film adaptations ==
The books were later adapted for the films Nanny McPhee (2005) and Nanny McPhee and the Big Bang (2010, also known as Nanny McPhee Returns in the United States). In the first motion picture there are only seven children, and Nurse Matilda is renamed Nanny McPhee – her first name is not mentioned.

The most significant departure from the books, however, is the absence of Mrs. Brown. In Brand's stories, Mrs. Brown is alive and well, whereas in the first film she is dead, having fallen ill after the birth of the youngest child, Agatha. Mr. Brown is being forced to marry the foul Selma Quickly, a garishly clothed, thrice-widowed gold-digger, whose character did not appear in the books.

The sequel Nanny McPhee and the Big Bang (2010) is loosely based on the trilogy of Nurse Matilda books. The film does not closely follow the plot of the trilogy, but several individual scenes are derived from the three books. Emma Thompson started to write the script, based on Brand's books, in the spring of 2007.

Although a third film was originally planned, as Emma Thompson stated previously in an interview on Friday Night with Jonathan Ross, the box office returns from the second film were determined to be too low to proceed with the third film.

== Stage musical ==
It was announced on April 12, 2018, that Emma Thompson would direct a stage musical based on her film Nanny McPhee, with it previously set to open in the West End in 2023.
