= Heather Shaw =

American stand-up comedian (born March 20, 1988)

- Born: Rochester, New York, U.S.
- Notable work: Alright, See Ya! (2026 special)
- Spouse: Lilly Jean Coiner (m. 2025)

Comedy career
- Years active: 2010s-present
- Medium: Stand-up, podcasting, internet videos
- Genres: Observational comedy, pop culture, sketch comedy
- Website: heathershawcomedy.com

Heather Shaw (born July 6, 1988) is an American stand-up comedian and podcaster. She first gained mainstream public attention through her social media posts as media outlets like the New York Post and Orlando Weekly noted her physical resemblance to Jim Carrey. She released her first comedy special Alright, See Ya! (2026) and since 2023, hosts her weekly podcast Heather Shaw is Kidding and her new podcast, The Guest Spot with Heather Shaw (debuting October 2026).

Shaw's comedy combines rapid-fire pop culture references with high-energy and often queer-focused humor, shifting focus away from the physical impressions that initially garnered online notoriety. She has appeared on shows including The Today Show and The Tamron Hall Show.

== Early Life ==
Shaw was born in Rochester, New York, and spent part of her childhood in Florida.

== Career ==
She began performing stand-up comedy around age 25 in Orlando, Florida, where she developed her early material at regional venues such as the Bull & Bush and participated in open-mic showcases hosted by comedian Preacher Lawson. During the COVID-19 pandemic, Shaw began posting sketch and commentary comedy videos on TikTok, her sketches frequently presenting herself as the illegitimate daughter of Jim Carrey. The videos garnered viral media coverage, eventually expanding her social media presence to over 2.8 million followers and 95 million likes on TikTok and 1 million followers on Instagram.

== Media Appearances ==
Shaw frequently guests on media.

TV. Comics Unleashed, The Today Show (Australia), The Tamron Hall Show, Atlanta’s 11 Alive, San Francisco’s ABC 7, Seattle’s FOX, Louisville's ABC and Western Mass News.

Online & Print. She has been profiled in Atlantic Ave Magazine, Cincinnati Magazine, Columbus Underground, Daily Illini, Deadline, Gayety, Lexington Herald Leader, Louisville Courier-Journal, Metro Weekly, NY Post, Orlando Weekly, Philadelphia Gay News, Seattle Gay News, Tagg Magazine, The Things, Tyler Morning Telegraph and Watermark Out News.

Podcasts. Shaw regularly guests on podcasts including: Absolutely Not with Heather McMahan, Ask Ronna, Beyond the Blinds, The Comedy Club Podcast, Fluently Forward, Front Page Pop, The Good Guys with Josh Peck, Hot Mike with Billy Bush, I'm Fine, You're Fine with Amber Autry, I'm Right You're Wrong, Jet Fuel Podcast, Josh Potter Podcast, numerous appearances on Juicy Scoop with Heather McDonald, Let’s Fight About It, Made It Out, MaDi Tells All, Manthropology, Ms. Crystal's Podcast Program, Nostalgia & Now, No Straight Answers, Only Child with Bob the Drag Queen, R.I.P. with Jordan Jensen, Right Now, So Bad It's Good with Ryan Bailey, Steph Infection with Steph Tolev, Tea Time with Raven & Miranda, The Tangle with Kyle Ridley, Tiger MILF, The Viall Files and Wrong Sauce (2025 and 2026).

== Awards ==
- Curve Magazine 2026 Power List.
- Go Magazine’s 100 Women We Love: Class of 2026
- Napa Valley Stream Fest Taste Maker Award 2025

== Personal life ==
Shaw is openly lesbian. She lives in Louisville, Kentucky and frequently incorporates personal stories into her comedy and interviews, including tales about her relationships and life as a touring comedian. On December 31, 2025, she married Kentucky attorney Lilly Jean Coiner in a New Year's Eve ceremony in Louisville, Kentucky. Their wedding was covered by People magazine.

Shaw has a brother and sister, both are openly gay.

Shaw is a vegan and sober.

Shaw is a volunteer with the Kentucky Humane Society.

== Stand-up specials ==
- Alright, See Ya! (2026, YouTube)
