= Félicien Marceau =

French novelist, playwright and essayist

- Born: 16 September 1913; Kortenberg
- Died: 7 March 2012 (aged 98); Paris
- Occupations: Novelist; Playwright; Essayist
- Awards: Prix Goncourt (1969)

Félicien Marceau (16 September 1913 – 7 March 2012) was a French novelist, playwright and essayist originally from Belgium. His real name was Louis Carette. He was close to the Hussards right-wing literary movement, which in turn was close to the monarchist movement . He was born in Kortenberg, Flemish Brabant.

Marceau received the Prix Goncourt for his book Creezy (ISBN 0714507083) in 1969. On 27 November 1975 he was elected to the Académie française, succeeding Marcel Achard. In 1974, Goudji created the academician's sword for Félicien Marceau.

== Bibliography ==
- 1948 Chasseneuil, novel (Gallimard)
- 1949 Casanova ou l’anti-Don Juan, essay (Gallimard)
- 1951 Capri petite île, novel (Gallimard)
- 1951 Chair et Cuir, novel (Gallimard )
- 1952 L’Homme du roi, novel (Gallimard)
- 1953 En de secrètes noces, stories (Calmann-Lévy)
- 1953 L’École des moroses, one-act play (Fayard)
- 1953 Bergère légère, novel (Gallimard)
- 1954 Caterina, three-act play (Théâtre I) (Gallimard)
- 1955 Balzac et son monde, essay (Gallimard)
- 1955 Les Élans du cœur, novel (Gallimard)
- 1957 Les Belles Natures, stories (Gallimard)
- 1957 L'Œuf, two part play (Théâtre II) (Gallimard) (English title: The Egg)
- 1959 La Bonne Soupe, two-act play (Théâtre I) (Gallimard) (English title: The Good Soup)
- 1960 La Mort de Néron, one-act play (Théâtre II)
- 1960 L’Étouffe-chrétien, two-act play (Théâtre II)
- 1962 Les Cailloux, two-act play (Gallimard)
- 1964 La Preuve par quatre, two-act play (Théâtre I)
- 1965 Madame Princesse, two-act play (Théâtre II)
- 1967 Diana et la Tuda, de Luigi Pirandello, play (Denoël)
- 1967 Un jour j’ai rencontré la vérité, two-act play
- 1968 Les Années courtes, mémoires (Gallimard )
- 1969 Le Babour, two-act play (Gallimard)
- 1969 Creezy, novel (Gallimard)
- 1971 Preface to Blazac's Le Père Goriot (Gallimard)
- 1972 L’Homme en question, two-act play (Gallimard )
- 1972 L’Ouvre-boîte, five-act play (Gallimard)
- 1975 Le Corps de mon ennemi, novel (Gallimard)
- 1975 Les Secrets de la Comédie humaine, two-act play (L’Avant-Scène)
- 1977 Le Roman en liberté, essay (Gallimard)
- 1977 Les Personnages de la Comédie humaine (Gallimard)
- 1978 La Trilogie de la villégiature, de Carlo Goldoni, play after the adaption of Giorgio Strehler (Éditions de la Comédie-Française)
- 1979 À nous de jouer, two-act play (Gallimard)
- 1983 Une insolente liberté. Les aventures de Casanova, essay (Gallimard)
- 1984 Appelez-moi Mademoiselle, novel (Gallimard )
- 1985 La Carriole du père Juniet (La Différence)
- 1987 Les Passions partagées, novel (Gallimard)
- 1989 Un Oiseau dans le ciel, novel (Gallimard )
- 1992 Les Ingénus, stories (Gallimard )
- 1993 La Terrasse de Lucrezia (Gallimard)
- 1994 Le Voyage de noces de Figaro (Les Belles-Lettres)
- 1997 La Grande Fille, novel (Gallimard)
- 1998 La Fille du pharaon, fables (Mercure de France)
- 1998 L’imagination est une science exacte, interviews with Charles Dantzig (Gallimard)
- 2000 L’Affiche, novel (Gallimard)
- 2002 L'homme en question (Gallimard)

== Filmography ==
- Three Girls in Paris, directed by Gabriel Axel (1963, based on the short story Trois de perdues)
- La Bonne Soupe, directed by Robert Thomas (1964, based on the play La Bonne Soupe)
- L'Œuf, directed by Jean Herman (1972, based on the play L'Œuf)
- Creezy, directed by Pierre Granier-Deferre (1974, based on the novel Creezy)
- Body of My Enemy, directed by Henri Verneuil (1976, based on the novel Le Corps de mon ennemi)

=== Screenwriter ===
- The Three Thieves, directed by Lionello De Felice (1954)
- Love and the Frenchwoman, anthology film, episode: "L'Enfance", directed by Henri Decoin (1960)
- The Seven Deadly Sins, anthology film, 2 episodes: "L'Orgueil", directed by Roger Vadim, and "L'Avarice", directed by Claude Chabrol (1962)
- Une blonde comme ça, directed by Jean Jabely (1962)
