= Veronica Rose =

British actress (1911–1968)

- Publicity still
- Born: Elsie Veronica Rose; 8 July 1911; Edinburgh, Scotland, UK
- Died: 25 January 1968 (aged 56); Headington, Oxfordshire, England, UK
- Occupation: Actress
- Years active: 1933–1948 (film)
- Spouse: Tom Walls (19??-19??)

Veronica Rose (8 July 1911 – 25 January 1968) was a British stage and film actress.

During the 1930s she appeared in a number of films directed by or starring her father-in-law Tom Walls, including several Aldwych Farce adaptations.

== Selected filmography ==
- Leave It to Smith (1933)
- A Cuckoo in the Nest (1933)
- Turkey Time (1933)
- A Cup of Kindness (1934)
- Stormy Weather (1935)
- Fighting Stock (1935)
- Once in a Million (1936)
- For Valour (1937)
- Second Best Bed (1938)
- Old Iron (1938)
- Warn That Man (1943)
- Death in High Heels (1947)
