= Something to Answer For =

1968 novel by P. H. Newby

- First edition dustjacket; design reused in 2018 with added text
- Author: P. H. Newby
- Language: English
- Publisher: Faber & Faber
- Publication date: November 1968
- Publication place: United Kingdom
- Pages: 288
- ISBN: 0-571-08557-1
- OCLC: 65294405

Something to Answer For is a 1968 novel by the English writer P. H. Newby, first published by Faber & Faber. Its chief claim to fame is that in 1969 it won the inaugural Booker Prize, which would go on to become one of the major literary awards in the English-speaking world.

It was reissued by Faber & Faber in 2008 in the "Faber Finds" line, in 2011 as a paperback, and again in 2018.

== Plot ==
Townrow is a fund distributor stealing from the fund he is in charge of. He is contacted by the widow of an old friend, Elie Khoury. They had met ten years previously, in 1946, in Port Said after he had been thrown from a horse in front of the Khourys' beach hut. Mrs Khoury wants Townrow to go to see her in Cairo because she believes her husband was murdered.

After thinking it through, Townrow accepts Mrs Khoury's offer of a plane ticket to Cairo. He stops over in Rome where he converses with an Israeli journalist who accuses the British government of failing to prevent the Holocaust. The discussion ends on a friendly note.

In Cairo, Townrow makes a joke about marrying Mrs Khoury for her money to an immigration officer, which leads to him being interrogated. He is kept in a cell and is released once his train has departed. Townrow doesn't go straightaway to see Mrs Khoury when he arrives in Port Said, instead opting to stay in a hotel. Here he considers having no one who really cares about him in his life.

Townrow visits a bar he used to frequent while serving here as a sergeant. The owner of the bar, Christous, recognises him and kicks out his clientele for some privacy. Townrow asks about Elie's death. Christous tells him that Mrs Khoury, with great difficulty, took her husband's body back to Lebanon to be buried. Because of her actions, Colonel Nasser took the Suez Canal as Egypt's. Townrow is not sure whether to believe any of this and gets so drunk he blacks out. He awakens naked and alone, and is attacked by a passing camel-driver, causing his head and one eye to be bandaged for most of the remainder of the novel.

After the discussion with Christous and Townrow's subsequent blackout, the novel becomes much more dream-like and at times surreal, with Townrow a very unreliable narrator who cannot remember his nationality (though he asserts that he is Irish as part of a scam he tries to run on Mrs Khoury) nor whether his mother is alive. He imagines that Elie is still alive, or that he is watching the burial at sea. He meets an Egyptian Jew, Leah, who is married and repels his attentions though apparently she later becomes his lover and develops an obsession for him. Townrow walks through scenes of mob unrest, is arrested as a spy, and watches bloody gunfights between Egyptian and British troops with bemused detachment. He imagines digging up Elie's grave to make certain he is really dead, then apparently actually does so.

At the end of the novel, though it is uncertain how much of what was related actually took place or how much was a fever or drunken dream, Townrow comes to believe that a citizen is not responsible for the morality of his government and has only himself and his own actions to answer for.
