= London Particular =

1952 novel

- First edition
- Author: Christianna Brand
- Cover artist: Freda Nichols
- Language: English
- Series: Inspector Cockrill
- Genre: Mystery
- Publisher: Michael Joseph
- Publication date: 1952
- Publication place: United Kingdom
- Media type: Print
- Preceded by: Death of Jezebel
- Followed by: Tour de Force

London Particular is a 1952 mystery crime novel by the British writer Christianna Brand. It is the fifth in a series of novels featuring her fictional police detective Inspector Cockrill and also portrays another of her characters Inspector Charlesworth. It was published in the United States in 1953 under the alternative title of Fog of Doubt.

== Synopsis ==
During a dense London fog, a Belgian man Raoul Vernet has his head staved in while on his way to visit Doctor Evans and his family. Due to the poor visibility it is unclear who has committed the murder, although several have motives.

== Bibliography ==
- Bargainnier, Earl F. & Dove George N. Cops and Constables: American and British Fictional Policemen. Popular Press, 1986.
- Reilly, John M. Twentieth Century Crime & Mystery Writers. Springer, 2015.
