= Going Steady (book) =

Book by Pauline Kael

Going Steady: Film Writings 1968–1969
- First edition
- Author: Pauline Kael
- Cover artist: Seymour Chwast
- Language: English
- Genre: Film Critique
- Publisher: Little, Brown
- Publication date: 1969
- Publication place: United States
- ISBN: 978-0-7145-2976-9

Going Steady: Film Writings 1968–1969 is the third collection of film reviews by the critic Pauline Kael, comprising the years 1968–1969, when she first began her film-reviewing duties at The New Yorker and which covers, " a crucial period of social and aesthetic change at the end of the sixties."

The collection for the most part consists of reviews of individual films, but includes one long essay, (which appeared originally in Harper's Magazine), entitled "Trash, Art, and the Movies ", perhaps the closest Kael comes to a manifesto defining her personal aesthetics in regards to films. In the essay, Kael dissects, compares, and contrasts the merits of "trash" films that are nevertheless entertaining, as well as "art" films that are uninteresting. In doing so, Kael lambastes "art" films such as Kubrick's 2001: A Space Odyssey, concluding her treatment of that particular film by declaring: "If big film directors are to get credit for doing badly what others have been doing brilliantly for years with no money, just because they've put it on a big screen, then businessmen are greater than poets and theft is art." The essay is divided into ten parts, ranging from discussions of The Thomas Crown Affair to Petulia. Kael's overriding theme is to dismantle the intellectual pretences of those who deride films deemed to be "trash" on the basis of dubious aesthetic concerns, notwithstanding the entertainment appeal a particular "trash" film might possess.

Other notable reviews include Kael's treatment of the Norman Mailer film Wild 90, its relation to cinéma vérité, and the implications of that particular film-making technique.

This book is out-of-print in the United States, but is still published by Marion Boyars Publishers of the United Kingdom.

== Editions ==
- Little, Brown, 1969, hardbound
- Bantam, 1971, paperback (ISBN 978-0-553-05880-2)
- Pauline Kael (March 1979). Going steady. ISBN 978-0-446-91075-0.)
- Pauline Kael (1994). Going steady. Marion Boyars Publishers Ltd. ISBN 978-0-7145-2976-9.)
