= Encyclopedia (novel) =

1969 novel by Richard Horn

- First edition cover
- Author: Richard Horn
- Language: English
- Genre: Hypertext fiction
- Publisher: Grove Press
- Publication date: 1969
- Publication place: United States
- ISBN: 9798218122676

Encyclopedia is a 1969 novel by American writer Richard Horn (1942–1973). The book is an early example of hypertext fiction in which the narrative can be read in any order by following the various cross-references within the book.

== Plot ==
Encyclopedia is structured atypically for a novel. It consists of a series of encyclopedia entries laid out alphabetically and has 26 chapters, one for each letter of the alphabet. Because of this, the events are not laid out chronologically and can be read in any order, either front-to-back or by skipping around and following the various cross-references within the book. All the entries connect to Tom Jones and Sadie Massey, two aspiring writers who become involved in the East Coast literary and bohemian scenes.

== Development history ==
=== Publication history ===
Encyclopedia was first published by Grove Press in 1969. It was reprinted in 2023 by Tough Poets Press, a small press dedicated to publishing out-of-print classics, after a successful Kickstarter campaign.

== Reception ==
Encyclopedia received generally positive reception, with praise especially directed at the book's format. The Cincinnati Enquirer wrote that Horn "takes a simple relationship between two people and views it from a unique point of view" and that the book was enjoyable despite not having a traditional plot. The Green Bay Press-Gazette mused that the unique form of the novel could grant it lasting significance but criticized the story for having no real resolution. The Province praised Encyclopedia's humor and positively compared Horn to avant-garde writers such as James Joyce, Vladimir Nabokov, and John Fowles. The Argus-Leader and St. Louis Dispatch both wrote positively about the format, with the former describing it as "an extraordinary device."

A review by Edward White in the Los Angeles Times praised the format of the book and wrote that the act of cross-referencing various entries made for an enjoyable experience but criticized Horn's prose, negatively comparing it to real-world encyclopedias. The Miami Herald was similarly critical, writing that the novel failed as a "book about sex" and that "better writers have tried" and failed to innovate the format. The Fresno Bee described it as a "non-novel" while The Morning News wrote that the story was "ultimately a bore."
