= Christianna Brand =

British crimewriter (1907–1988)

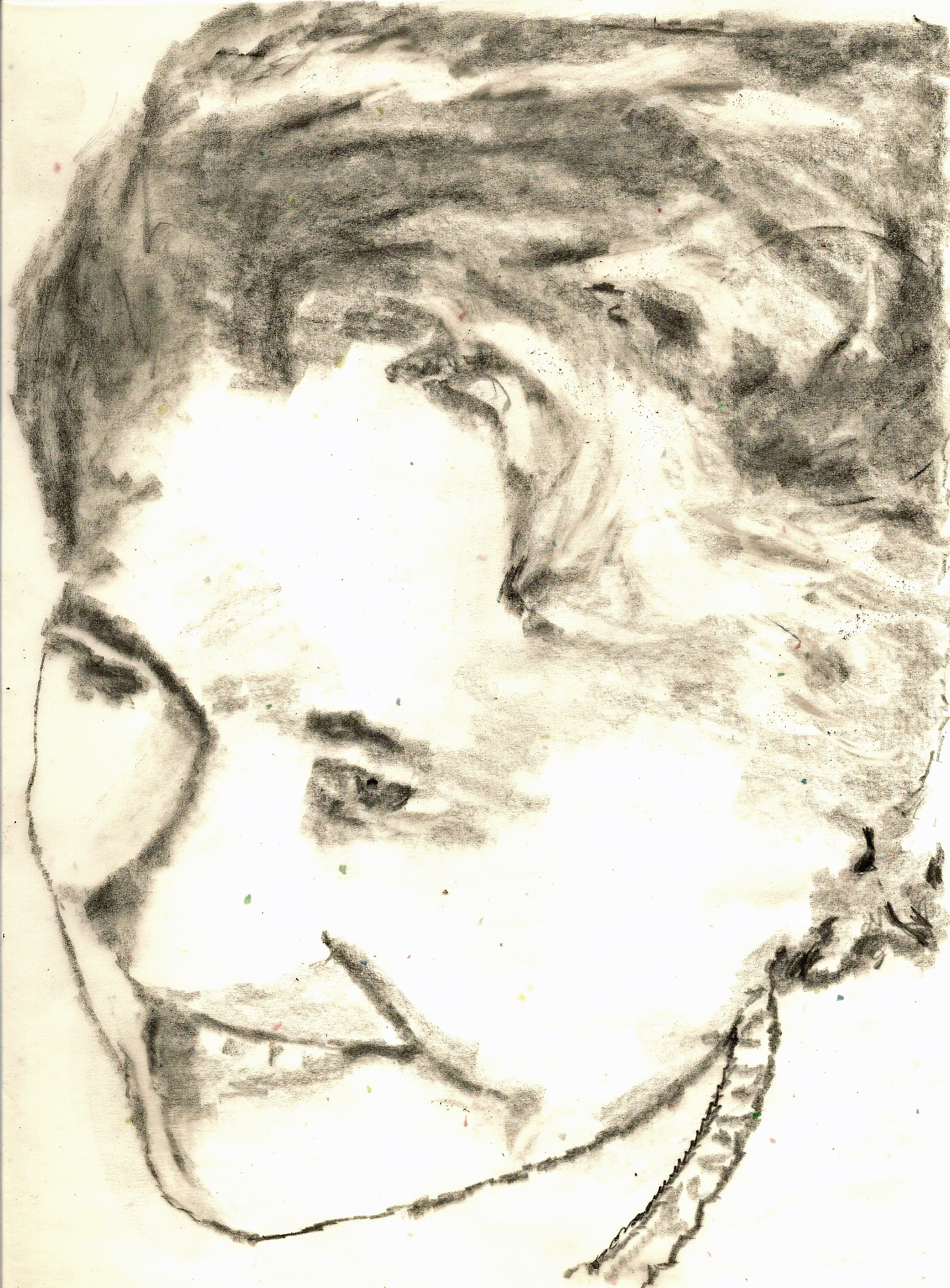
- Pencil sketch of Christianna Brand
- Born: Mary Christianna Milne; 17 December 1907; British Malaya
- Died: 11 March 1988 (aged 80)
- Occupation: Writer
- Spouse: Roland Lewis (m. 1936)
- Relatives: Edward Ardizzone (cousin)
- Writing career
- Language: English
- Genres: Children's literature Mystery
- Notable works: Green for Danger and other books in The Inspector Cockrill Series; Nurse Matilda

Mary Christianna Lewis (née Milne; 17 December 1907 – 11 March 1988), known professionally as Christianna Brand, was a British crime writer and children's author born in British Malaya (now Malaysia).

== Biography ==
Brand was born Mary Christianna Milne in Malaya but spent most of her childhood in England and India. She had a number of different occupations, including model, dancer, shop assistant, and governess. Brand also wrote under the pseudonyms Mary Ann Ashe, Annabel Jones, Mary Brand, Mary Roland, and China Thompson. Christianna Brand served as chair of the Crime Writers' Association from 1972 to 1973.

She married Roland Lewis. Her first novel, Death in High Heels, was written while Brand was working as a salesgirl, the idea stemming from her fantasies about doing away with an annoying co-worker. In 1941, one of her best-loved characters, Inspector Cockrill of the Kent County Police, made his debut in the book Heads You Lose. The character would go on to appear in seven of her novels. Green for Danger is Brand's most famous novel. The whodunit, set in a World War II hospital, was adapted for film by Eagle-Lion Films in 1946, starring Alastair Sim as the Inspector. She dropped the series in the late 1950s and concentrated on various other genres as well as short stories. She was nominated three times for Edgar Awards: for the short stories "Poison in the Cup" (EQMM, Feb. 1969) and "Twist for Twist" (EQMM, May 1967) and for a nonfiction work about a Scottish murder case, Heaven Knows Who (1960). She is the author of the children's series Nurse Matilda, which Emma Thompson adapted to film as Nanny McPhee (2005).

Her Inspector Cockrill short stories and a previously unpublished Cockrill stage play were collected as The Spotted Cat and Other Mysteries from Inspector Cockrill's Casebook, edited by Tony Medawar (2002).

Mary Lewis died on 11 March 1988, aged 80. Her estate was valued at £96,417. She was the cousin of the illustrator Edward Ardizzone.

== Bibliography ==
=== Novels ===
==== As Christianna Brand ====
===== Novels featuring Inspector Charlesworth =====
- Death in High Heels (1941)
- The Rose in Darkness (1979)

===== Novels featuring Inspector Cockrill =====
- Heads You Lose (1941)
- Green for Danger (1944) OCLC 2881188. Serialised in the United States as Danger List
- Suddenly at His Residence (US title: The Crooked Wreath) (1946) OCLC 557498732. Serialised in the United States as One of the Family
- Death of Jezebel (1948)
- London Particular (US title: Fog of Doubt) (1952)
- Tour de Force (1955)
- The Spotted Cat and Other Mysteries from Inspector Cockrill's Casebook (Crippen & Landru, 2002)

===== Novels featuring Inspector Chucky =====
- Cat and Mouse (1950) OCLC 557497970
- A Ring of Roses (1977)

===== Non-series titles =====
- The Three Cornered Halo (1957)
- Court of Foxes (1969)
- The Honey Harlot (1978)
- The Brides of Aberdar (1982)

===== Collections =====
- What Dread Hand? (1968):
  - The Hornets' Nest (Inspector Cockrill)
  - Aren't Our Police Wonderful?
  - The Merry-Go-Round
  - Blood Brothers (Cockrill)
  - Dear Mr Editor ...
  - The Rose
  - Akin to Love ...
  - Death of Don Juan
  - Double Cross
  - The Sins of the Fathers ...
  - After the Event
  - Death of a Ghost
  - The Kite
  - Hic Jacet ...
  - Murder Game
- Brand X (1974)
  - The Niece from Scotland
  - A Miracle in Montepulciano (essay)
  - Such a Nice Man
  - I Will Repay
  - How the Unicorn Became Extinct (essay)
  - The Kite
  - Charm Farm
  - A Bit of Bovver
  - The Blackthorn
  - The Hilltop
  - How Green Is My Valley! (essay)
  - Bless This House
  - Spring 1941 (essay)
  - Murder Hath Charms
  - An Apple for the Teacher (essay)
  - Pigeon Pie
  - Madame Thinks Quick
  - The Scapegoat
- Buffet for Unwelcome Guests (1983)
  - After the Event (Inspector Cockrill)
  - Blood Brothers (Cockrill)
  - The Hornet's Nest (Cockrill)
  - Poison in the Cup
  - Murder Game
  - The Scapegoat
  - No More a-Maying ...
  - The Niece from Scotland
  - Hic Jacet ...
  - The Merry-Go-Round
  - Upon Reflection
  - From the Balcony ...
  - Bless This House
  - Such a Nice Man
  - The Whispering
  - The Hand of God
- The Spotted Cat and Other Mysteries from Inspector Cockrill's Casebook (2002):
  - Inspector Cockrill (essay)
  - After the Event (Cockrill)
  - Blood Brothers (Cockrill)
  - The Hornet's Nest (Cockrill)
  - Poison in the Cup (Cockrill)
  - The Telephone Call (Cockrill)
  - The Kissing Cousin (Cockrill)
  - The Rocking-Chair (Cockrill)
  - The Man on the Roof (Cockrill)
  - Alleybi (Cockrill)
  - The Spotted Cat (Cockrill)

===== Books for children =====
- Welcome to Danger (1949) juvenile mystery, also published as Danger Unlimited
- Nurse Matilda (Leicester: Brockhampton Press, 1964), illustrated by Edward Ardizzone
- Nurse Matilda Goes to Town (Leicester: Brockahmpton Press,1967), illustrated by Edward Ardizzone
- Nurse Matilda Goes to Hospital (Leicester: Brockhampton Press, 1974), illustrated by Edward Ardizzone

==== As Mary Roland ====
- The Single Pilgrim (1946)

==== As China Thompson ====
- Starrbelow (1958)

==== As Annabel Jones ====
- The Radiant Dove (1975)

==== As Mary Ann Ashe ====
- Alas, for Her That Met Me! (1976)

=== Unpublished novels ===
- Take off the Roof (Non-series)
- Jape de Chine or The Chinese Puzzle (Cockrill)

=== Non-fiction books ===
- Heaven Knows Who (1960)

=== Uncollected short stories ===
==== As Mary Brand ====
- Dance Hostess. The Star, 8 April 1939
- Gloria Walked down Bond Street. The Tatler, 1939

==== As Christianna Brand ====
- Shadowed Sunlight. Woman, 7 July to 11 August 1945. Reprinted in Bodies from the Library: Volume 4, ed. by Tony Medawar (2021)
- Hibiscus Blooms Again.
- Mother. Woman’s Realm, 17 January 1959 (romantic story)
- Grandad. Woman’s Realm, 24 October 1959 (romantic story)
- The Right Man for Tilly. Woman’s Realm, 12 May 1960 (romantic story)
- Someone to Love. Woman’s Realm, 1 October 1960 (romantic story)
- To Remember with Tears. Woman’s Realm, 3 May 1962 (romantic story)
- White Wedding. Woman’s Realm, 19 May 1962 (romantic story)
- The Witch. Woman, August 1962. Reprinted in Ghosts from the Library, ed. by Tony Medawar (2022) (supernatural story)
- Cloud Nine. Published in Verdict of Thirteen: A Detection Club Anthology (1979)
- Over My Dead Body. Ellery Queen's Mystery Magazine, August 1979
- A Piece of Cake. Ellery Queen's Mystery Magazine, January 1983
- And She Smiled at Me. Ellery Queen's Mystery Magazine, May 1983
- To the Widow. The Saint Magazine, June 1984
- Bank Holiday Murder. Ellery Queen's Mystery Magazine, September/October 2017
- Cyanide in the Sun. Daily Sketch, August 1958. An edited version was published in an anthology, The Realm of the Impossible (2018)
- NOFACE. Bodies from the Library: Volume 2, ed. by Tony Medawar (2019)
- The Rum Punch. Bodies from the Library: Volume 1, ed. by Tony Medawar (2018)

=== Unpublished short stories ===
- The Dead Hold Fast (Inspector Charlesworth)
- Inquest
- The Little Nun
- The Mermaid
- Murder by Dog
- The Murder Man
- The Codicil

=== Uncollected short non-fiction ===
==== As Christianna Brand ====
- Ball or Skein. The Times, 16 February 1944 (Published anonymously)
- The Detective Story Form. Press and Freelance Writer and Photographer, August 1950
- May I Introduce Myself?. Ellery Queen's Mystery Magazine (Japanese edition), March 1983
- Famous Writers I've Known in the Long Ago Past. Ellery Queen's Mystery Magazine (Japanese edition), July 1983

=== Anthologies edited by Christianna Brand ===
- Naughty Children: An Anthology (London: Victor Gollancz, 1962), illustrated by Edward Ardizzone
