= Edward Ardizzone bibliography =

This is a bibliography of the works of the prolific illustrator and author Edward Ardizzone, CBE RA (16 October 1900- 8 November 1979).

== The Little Tim series, written and illustrated by Edward Ardizzone ==
Little Tim books, both written and illustrated by Edward Ardizzone
Title	Year of 1st UK Publication	UK Publisher	Other editions	Notes
Little Tim and the Brave Sea Captain	1936	Oxford University Press	1940 3rd printing modified (OUP) 1944 paperback edition (OUP) 1955 2nd edition (OUP) 1977 paperback (Penguin / Picture Puffin) 1982 reprint of 1955 edition (Kestrel Books) 1999 4th edition (London: Scholastic Press) 2000 US edition (Lothrop, Lee and Shepard) 2005 UK edition (Frances Lincoln) 2015 UK 80th anniversary edition (Frances Lincoln)	Translations: German, Danish, Norwegian, Swedish, Dutch, French, Japanese. 45rpm gramophone record, 1965.
Lucy Brown and Mr. Grimes	1937	Oxford University Press	1970 2nd edition (The Bodley Head) 1971 US edition (Henry Z. Walck, Inc)	The 1970 2nd edition was significantly revised. Translations: Japanese
Tim and Lucy go to Sea	1938	Oxford University Press	1944 paperback edition 1958 3rd edition 1958 US edition (Henry Z. Walck, Inc) 1999 4th edition (London: Scholastic Press) 2006 UK edition (Frances Lincoln)	Translations: Swedish, Dutch, French, Japanese
Tim to the Rescue	1949	Oxford University Press	1957 US reprints (Henry Z. Walck) 1981 UK paperback (Penguin / Picture Puffin) 2000 2nd edition (London: Scholastic Press) 2000 US edition (Lothrop, Lee and Shepard) 2005 UK edition (Frances Lincoln)	Translations: Swedish, Afrikaans, Norwegian, Japanese French
Tim and Charlotte	1951	Oxford University Press	7 UK reprints to 1989 1951 US editions (Henry Z. Walck, Inc) 1989 UK paperback (OUP) 2000 editions (London: Scholastic; NY:HarperCollins)	Translations: Swedish, French, Japanese 45 rpm gramophone record, 1964
Tim in Danger	1953	Oxford University Press		
Tim All Alone	1956	Oxford University Press	9 UK reprints to 1989 1956 US edition (New York: OUP) 1963, 1964 US editions (NY: Henry Z. Walck, Inc) 2000 editions (London: Scholastic; NY:HarperCollins) 2007 UK edition (Frances Lincoln)	Won the inaugural Kate Greenaway Medal in 1956 Translations: Afrikaans, Japanese
Tim's Friend Towser	1962	Oxford University Press	1962 US edition (NY: Henry Z. Walck, Inc) 2 UK reprint to 1989 2000 editions (London: Scholastic; NY:HarperCollins) 2006 UK edition (Frances Lincoln)	Translations: Swedish, Japanese
Tim and Ginger	1965	Oxford University Press	5 UK reprints to 1989 1965 US edition (NY: Henry Z. Walck, Inc) 2000 editions (London: Scholastic; NY:HarperCollins) 2007 UK edition (Frances Lincoln)	Translations: Swedish, Japanese, Norwegian, Finnish
Tim to the Lighthouse	1968	Oxford University Press	2 UK reprints to 1989 1968 US edition (NY: Henry Z. Walck, Inc) 2000 editions (London: Scholastic; NY:HarperCollins) 2007 UK edition (Frances Lincoln)	Translations: French, German, Japanese
Tim's Last Voyage	1972	The Bodley Head	1972 US edition (NY: Henry Z. Walck, Inc) 1984 UK paperback (Macmillan Children's / Picturemacs) 1993 UK paperback (Random House / Red Fox) 2000 UK edition (London: Scholastic) 2007 UK edition (Frances Lincoln)	Translations: Japanese
Ship's Cook Ginger	1977	The Bodley Head	1978 US edition (NY: Macmillan Publishing Co.) 1985 UK paperback (Macmillan Children's / Picturemacs) 1991 (London: Random Century / Little Greats) 1993 UK paperback (Random House / Red Fox) 2000 UK edition (London: Scholastic) 2007 UK edition (Frances Lincoln)	Translations: Swedish, Japanese

== Other books written and illustrated by Edward Ardizzone ==
All other books both written and illustrated by Edward Ardizzone
Title	Year of 1st Publication	Publisher	Other editions	Notes
Baggage to the Enemy	1941	London: John Murray	1942 book club reprint for The Right Book Club, London	working title was 'Artist in Flanders'
Nicholas and the Fast Moving Diesel	1948	London: Eyre & Spottiswoode	1958 anthologised edition in James Reeves (ed.), A Golden Land, pp. 312–322 1959 2nd edition (Oxford University Press) 1959 US edition (NY: Henry Z. Walck) 1980 3rd edition (London: The Bodley Head)	Translations: Swedish Date often attributed to 1947 but wasn't published until 1948
Paul The Hero of the Fire	1948	Penguin Books – A Porpoise Book	1948 US edition (Boston: Houghton Mifflin) 1958 anthologised edition in James Reeves (ed.), A Golden Land, pp. 24–35 1962 Japanese Workbook edition (Tokyo: Eirinsha) 1962 2nd edition (London: Constable & Co. Ltd) 1963 US edition (NY: Henry Z. Walck) 1969 paperback (Penguin / Picture Puffin) 1974 5th impression (London: Kestrel Books)	Translations: Swedish
Johnny the Clockmaker	1960	London: Oxford University Press	1971 and 1980 reprints in hardback and paperback 1960 US edition (NY: Henry Z. Walck, Inc) 2008 UK reprint hardback	Translations: Swedish, German, Zulu, Japanese
Peter the Wanderer	1963	London: Oxford University Press	1964 US edition (NY: Henry Z. Walck, Inc)	
Diana and her Rhinoceros	1964	London: The Bodley Head	1964 US edition (NY: Henry Z. Walck, Inc) 1983 paperback edition (Methuen Children's Books / Magnet) 1993 paperback edition (The Bodley Head / Red Fox) 2008 hardback edition (Frances Lincoln)	Translations: Afrikaans, Japanese
Sarah and Simon and No Red Paint	1965	London: Constable Young Books	1966 US edition (NY: Delacorte Press) 1974 Kestrel Books hardback with dust jacket 2012 Tate Publishing hardback with dust jacket	No dust jacket on the 1st published edition
The Wrong Side of the Bed	1970	NY: Doubleday, & Company	1970 UK edition (London, The Bodley Head) published as Johnny's Bad Day	wordless picture book French edition 1992
The Young Ardizzone: An autobiographical fragment	1970	London: Studio Vista	1970 US edition (NY: Macmillan) 2010 (London: Slightly Foxed) hardback edition 2013 Slightly Foxed paperback edition	
Diary of a War Artist	1974	London: The Bodley Head		
Indian Diary 1952-53	1984	London: The Bodley Head		

== Books by others, illustrated by Edward Ardizzone ==
Books by other authors, illustrated by Edward Ardizzone
Author	Title	Year of 1st Publication	Publisher	Other editions	Notes
Fanu, Sheridan Le	In A Glass Darkly	1929	London: Peter Davies	1988 selected reprint (5 illustrations) in: Michael Cox (editor, The Illustrated J. S. Le Fanu: Ghost Stories and Mysteries	This was the first Ardizzone illustrated edition; the book was first published in 1872
Crabbe, George	The Library	1930	London: De La More Press	2 editions; the cheaper issue didn't have vignette illustration on the title page, or endpapers	First Ardizzone edition; the book was first published in 1781
Bloomfield, Paul (compiled by)	The Mediterranean	1935	London: Cassell and Company, Ltd		
Lyons, A. Neil	Tom, Dick and Harriet	1937	London: The Cresset Press		
Dickens, Charles	Great Expectations	1939	New York: for members of the Heritage Club	1962 2nd edition (NY: The Heritage Press) 1979 Collectors edition (CT: Easton Press)	
Gorham, Maurice	The Local	1939	London: Cassell & Co. Ltd	2010 reprint (Little Toller Books)	
Kaeser, H.J.	Mimff	1939	London: Oxford University Press	4 OUP reprints to 1960	Translated by Kathleen Williamson
Bates, H.E	My Uncle Silas	1939	London: Jonathan Cape	1947 new edition 1947 Reprint Society edition 1958 paperback (Penguin Books)	
Maurois, André	The Battle of France	1940	London: John Lane The Bodley Head	1940 book club edition for the Right Book Club, London	Translated from the French by F. R. Ludman
Freeman, C. Denis; Cooper, Douglas	The Road to Bordeaux	1940	London: The Cresset Press	1940 and 1941 reprints 1942 book club edition, Readers Union	
Mare, Walter de la	Peacock Pie: A Book of Rhymes	1946	London: Faber and Faber	reprinted 1946 1953 reprint in larger format 1958 paperback edition 1969 revised and enlarged definitive edition 2001 paperback edition (Faber Children's Classics)	Translations: 1977 Japanese edition
Villon, François	The Poems of François Villon	1946	London: The Cresset Press		Translated from the French by H. B. McCaskie
Shakespeare, William; selected by Hallam Fordham	Hey Nonny Yes: Passions and Conceits from Shakespeare	1947	The Saturn Press		
Bunyan, John	The Pilgrim's Progress	1947	London: Faber and Faber	3 reprints to 1957	1st Ardizzone edition was 1947. Pilgrim's Progress was 1st published in 1678.
Black, Margaret	Three Brothers and a Lady	1947	The Acorn Press		
Langley, Noel	The True and Pathetic History of Desbarollda the Waltzing Mouse	1947	London: Lindsay Drummond		
Hawksley, Enid Dickens	Charles Dickens Birthday Book	1948	London: Faber and Faber		Birthday book, with spaces to write in birthdays for each day
Lewis, C. Day	The Otterbury Indcident	1948	London: Putnam & Company	2 UK reprints to 1963 1949 US edition (NY: The Viking Press) 1950 school edition (London: Heinemann Educational / Windmill) 1961 paperback (Penguin Books / Puffin) 1966 new edition (London: The Bodley Head) Reprinted 3 x to 1982 1969 US edition (NY: The World Publishing Co.)	Translations: Norwegian, Serbian
Gorham, Maurice	Back to the Local	1949	London: Percival Marshall		
Kaeser, H. J.	Mimff in Charge	1949	London: Oxford University Press		Translated into English by David Ascoli
Langley, Noel; Pynegar, Hazel	Somebody's Rocking My Dreamboat	1949	London: Arthur Barker Ltd		
Mardrus, J. C.; Mathers, E. Powys (translations)	The Tale of Ali Baba and The Forty Thieves	1949	New York: The Limited Editions Club		One of 3 Evergreen Tales issued as a set in a red slip case
Gorham, Maurice	Londoners	1951	London: Percival Marshall		
Gorham, Maurice	Showmen and Suckers	1951	London: Percival Marshall		
Reeves, James	The Blackbird in the Lilac	1951	London: Geoffrey Cumberlege, Oxford University Press	4 UK reprints to 1972. Then included in James Reeves, Complete Poems for Children (1973) 1959 US edition (NY: Dutton & Co, Inc)	
Nubar, Zareh	The Modern Prometheus. The Hope for Humanity: The Tragic Conflict of Knowledge and Ignorance	1952	London: Forge Press		
Trollope, Anthony	The Warden	1952	London: Geoffrey Cumberlege, Oxford University Press (The Oxford Trollope)	1980 Oxford World's Classics edition (pocket sized hardback – full page drawings omitted)	
Trollope, Anthony	Barchester Towers	1953	London: Geoffrey Cumberlege, Oxford University Press (The Oxford Trollope)	1980 Oxford Worlds's Classics edition (pocket sized hardback) 1982 US Franklin Library edition	
Lewis, C. Day	Christmas Eve (Ariel Poems)	1954	London: Faber and Faber		slim sewn booklet, with envelope
Corrin, Stephen	The Fantastic Tale of the Plucky Sailor and the Postage Stamp	1954	London: Faber and Faber		
Kaeser, H. J.	Mimff Takes Over	1954	London: Geoffrey Cumberlege, Oxford University Press	reprints 1956, 1960	Translated into English by David Ascoli
Thackeray, William Makepeace	The Newcomes	1954	Cambridge: printed for members of The Limited Edition Club at the University Press	c. 1955 2nd edition for The Heritage Press, NY	
Dickens, Charles	Bleak House	1955	London: Oxford University Press		
Dickens, Charles	David Copperfield	1955	London: Oxford University Press		
Farjeon, Eleanor	The Little Bookroom	1955	London: Geoffrey Cumberlege Oxford University Press	1956 US edition (NY: OUP) 1972 paperback (London: OUP) 1977 paperback (Penguin / Puffin Books) 1979 cheap edition (New Oxford Library) 2011 paperback (Oxford: OUP)	Book won the Carnegie Meal in 1955 and Eleanor Farjeon was awarded the Hans Christian Andersen Award in 1956. Translations: Swedish, Danish, Norwegian
Pearce, Philippa	Minnow on the Say	1955	London: Geoffrey Cumberlege Oxford University Press	1958 US edition as Minnow Leads to Treasure (Cleveland: World Publishing Co.) 1972 paperback (London: OUP) 1974 cheap edition (Oxford Children's Library) 1978 paperback (Penguin / Puffin Books) 1998 paperback (Oxford Children's Modern Classics) 2000 US edition as Minnow on the Say (NY: Greenwillow books) 2001 paperback (Oxford: OUP)	Translations: German, Swedish
Stonier, G. W.	Pictures on the Pavement	1955	London: Michael Joseph		
Kenward, James	The Suburban Child	1955	Cambridge: at the University Press		
Trevor, Meriol	Sun Slower Sun Faster	1955	London: Collins	1957 US edition (NY: Sheed and Ward)	
Thackeray, William Makepeace	The History of Henry Esmond, Esq	1956	NY: for members of the Limited Editions Club	1956 2nd impression NY: The Heritage Press	
Surtees, R. A.	Hunting with Mr. Jorrocks	1956	London: Geoffrey Cumberlege Oxford University Press		The text is from Chapters 7-58 of Handley Cross (expanded edition of 1854).
Reeves, James	Pigeons and Princesses	1956	London: Heinemann	1962 US edition (NY: Dutton) 1976 paperback edition (London: Hamlyn / Beaver Books)	Translations: Swedish
Phillips, J. B. (translated into Modern English by)	St. Luke's Life of Christ	1956	London: Collins	A limited edition (150 copies), signed by Phillips and Ardizzone, was produced simultaneously with 1st edition. Presented in slipcase with Curwen Press patterned paper design.	
Scurfield, George	A Stickful of Nonpareil	1956	Cambridge: at the University Press	500 copies. Abridged reprint in Matrix: A Review for Printers and Bibliophiles, No. 13 (Winter 1993), pp. 151–157	
Young, Percy	Ding Dong Bell: A First Book of Nursery Rhymes	1957	London: Dennis Dobson		
Symonds, John	Lottie	1957	London: The Bodley Head		
Reeves, James	Prefabulous Animiles	1957	London: Heinemann	1960 US edition (NY: Dutton)	
Goldman, Joan M.	The School in Our Village	1957	London: B. T. Batsford Ltd		
Bates, H. E.	Sugar for the Horse	1957	London: Michael Joseph		
Reeves, James	The Wandering Moon	1957	London: Heinemann	4 reprints to 1968	The collection was 1st published in 1950 with illustrations by Evadne Rowan
Cecil, Henry	Brief to Counsel	1958	London: Michael Joseph	1972 2nd edition with new author's preface 1958 US edition (NY: Harper Bros) 1982 UK 3rd edition, with a new foreword	
Shakespeare, William	The Comedies	1958	NY: The Heritage Press	1986 collectors edition (CT: Easton Press)	
Farjeon, Eleanor	Jim at the Corner	1958	London: Oxford University Press	1958 US edition (NY: Henry Z. Walck) 1986 revised edition (John Goodchild) 1986 paperback (London: Methuen Children's Books / Magnet) 1990 US paperback (NY: Alfred Knopf / Bullseye Books)	The book was 1st published in 1934 with illustrations by Irene Mountfort. Translations: Japanese
Kaeser, H. J.	Mimff Robinson	1958	London: Oxford University Press		Translated into English by Ruth Michaelis Jena and Arthur Ratcliff The last Mimff story
Estes, Eleanor	Pinky Pie	1958	NY: Harcourt, Brace and Company	1959 UK edition (London: Constable & Co.)	
Mare, Walter de la	The Story of Joseph	1958	London: Faber and Faber		Text is taken from de la Mare's Stories from the Bible (1929).
Symonds, John	Elfrida and the Pig	1959	London: Harrap		Translation: Swedish
Reeves, James (retold by)	Exploits of Don Quixote	1959	London and Glasgow: Blackie	1960 US edition 1977 UK cheap reprint – lacks the colour plates	Based on Don Quixote by Miguel de Cervantes
Chesterton, G. K.	Father Brown Stories	1959	London: The Folio Society		
White, T. H.	The Godstone and the Blackymor	1959	London: Jonathan Cape	1959 US edition (NY: Putnam) 1960 Reprint Society edition	1959 US edition doesn't use EA's dust jacket
Ballantyne, Joan	Holiday Trench	1959	Thomas Nelson and Sons Ltd		
Williams, Ursula Moray	The Nine Lives of Island Mackenzie	1959	London: Chatto and Windus	1979 Chatto reprint in laminated boards 1980 paperback (Transworld / Carousel) 1960 US edition (NY: Wm. Morrow)	Translations: Swedish
Mare, Walter de la	The Story of Moses	1959	London: Faber and Faber		
Reeves, James	Titus in Trouble	1959	London: The Bodley Head	1960 US edition (NY: Henry Z. Walck, Inc) 1969 2nd UK ed (smaller size) 1972 2nd US ed (NY: Henry Z. Walck)	Translations: Swedish
Gough, Catherine	Boyhoods of Great Composers	1960	London: Oxford University Press		Translations: Afrikaans 1st and early editions in laminated yellow boards; later reprints in dark green boards with a dust jacket. This and Book Two (1962) were issued in a single volume edition in 1968.
Farjeon, Eleanor	Eleanor Farjeon's Book	1960	Penguin Books / Puffin		Chosen by Eleanor Graham
Farjeon, Eleanor	Italian Peepshow	1960	London: Oxford University Press	1960 US edition (NY: Henry Z. Walck)	
Ballantyne, Joan	Kidnappers at Coombe	1960	Thomas Nelson and Sons Ltd.		
Ray, Cyril	Merry England	1960	London: Vista Books		
Graves, Robert	The Penny Fiddle	1960	London: Cassell	1961 US edition (NY: Doubleday & Company)	
Mitchison, Naomi	The Rib of the Green Umbrella	1960	London: Collins		
Mare, Walter de la	The Story of Samuel and Saul	1960	London: Faber and Faber		
Estes, Eleanor	The Witch Family	1960	NY: Harcourt, Brace and Company	undated paperback edition (NY: Harcourt, Brace & World Inc. / Voyager) 1962 UK edition (London: Constable and Company Limited) Later Kestrel Books edition and paperback reprint (Target Books)	
Twain, Mark	The Adventures of Huckleberry Finn	1961	London: Heinemann / New Windmill		
Twain, Mark	The Adventures of Tom Sawyer	1961	London: Heinemann / New Windmill		
Gray, Nicholas Stuart	Down in the Cellar	1961	London: Dennis Dobson		
Cole, William (selected and edited by)	Folk Songs of England, Ireland, Scotland and Wales	1961	NY: Doubleday & Company, Inc.	1969 paperback reprints USA: Alfred Music 1991 reprint ISBN 9780897249553	Arranged for piano and guitar by Norman Monath
Reeves, James	Hurdy-Gurdy: Selected Poems	1961	The Windmill Press Ltd		
Mare, Walter de la	Stories from the Bible	1961	London: Faber and Faber	1961 US edition (NY: Alfred A. Knopf / Borzoi) 1963 Reprint Society edition	
Wuorio, Eva-Lis	The Island of Fish in the Trees	1961	NY: The World Publishing Company	1964 UK edition (London: Denis Dobson)	chosen as one of the New York Times best illustrated children's books of 1962
Graham, Eleanor; Barrie, J. M.	J. M. Barrie's Peter Pan: The Story of the Play	1962	Leicester: Brockhampton Press	1963 US edition (NY: Charles Scribner's Sons)	UK 1st edition doesn't have colour plates of later editions. Translations: Russian
Farjeon, Eleanor	Mrs. Malone	1962	London: Oxford University Press	1962 US edition (NY: Henry Z. Walck)	Translations: Japanese Korean
Brand, Christianna	Naughty Children: An Anthology	1962	London: Victor Gollancz	1963 US edition (NY: E. P. Dutton & Co.)	1st appearance in print of Nurse Matilda, later developed into the Nurse Matilda series of books (1964-1974). Nurse Matilda was the inspiration for Nanny McPhee
Betjeman, John	A Ring of Bells: Poems	1962	London: John Murray	1963 US edition (Boston: Houghton Mifflin) 1964 paperback John Murray 1964 school edition The Albemarle Library for Schools	Introduced and selected by Irene Slade
Reeves, James	Sailor Rumbelow and Britannia	1962	London: Heinemann	1962 US edition (NY: E. P. Dutton & Co., Inc.) under the title Sailor Rumbelow and Other Stories	
Faralla, Dana	The Singing Cupboard	1962	London and Glasgow: Blackie	1963 US edition (NY: Lippincott)	
Crozier, Eric	The Story of Let's Make an Opera!	1962	London: Oxford University Press		
Gough, Catherine	Boyhoods of Great Composers, Book Two	1963	London: Oxford University Press		This and Book One (1960) were issued in a single volume edition in 1968.
Farjeon, Eleanor	Kaleidoscope	1963	London: Oxford University Press	1986 reprint John Goodchild Publishers 1963 US edition (NY: Henry Z. Walck)	
King, Clive	Stig of the Dump	1963	Harmondsworth: Penguin Books / Puffin	Many paperback reprints 1965 new hardback edition (London: Hamish Hamilton) 1980 reprint (Kestrel Books) 2017 Folio Society edition (pictorial board, orange slipcase)	
Estes, Eleanor	The Alley	1964	NY: Harcourt, Brace & World, Inc		not published in the UK
Graves, Robert	Ann at Highwood Hall	1964	London: Cassell	1964 US edition (NY: Doubleday & Company, Inc)	
Wahl, Jan	Hello Elephant	1964	NY: Holt, Rinehart and Winston	also published simultaneously in Canada	not published in the UK
Wuorio, Eva-Lis	The Land of Right Up and Down	1964	NY: The World Publishing Company	1964 UK edition (London: Dennis Dobson)	
Brand, Christianna	Nurse Matilda	1964	Leicester: Brockhampton Press	1964 US edition 1973 paperback reprint (Brockhampton Press) later paperbacks (Hodder and Stoughton / Knight Books) 1988 library edition (Bath: The Chivers Press) 2005 3 book box set with the 2 later Matilda titles, published by Bloomsbury	Nurse Matilda was the inspiration for Nanny McPhee Translations: German, Swedish, French
Reeves, James	The Story of Jackie Thimble	1964	NY: E. P. Dutton & Co., Inc	1965 UK edition (London: Chatto & Windus)	from 1973 the text was included in James Reeves's Complete Poems for Children
Faralla, Dana	Swanhilda-of-the-Swans	1964	London and Glasgow: Blackie		
Buchan, John	The Thirty-nine Steps	1964	London: J. M. Dent	1992 UK paperback edition (J. M. Dent)	
Reeves, James	Three Tall Tales	1964	Abelard-Schuman		
Cecil, Henry	Know About English Law	1965	London and Glasgow: Blackie	1974 revised edition as Learn About English Law (London: William Luscombe)	
Nichols, Freda P.	The Milldale Riot	1965	London: Ginn and Company		
Farjeon, Eleanor	The Old Nurse's Stocking Basket	1965	London: Oxford University Press	1965 US edition (NY: Henry Z. Walck) 1981 UK paperback (Puffin Books)	
Ross, Diana	Old Perisher	1965	London: Faber and Faber		
Lederer, William J.	Timothy's Song	1965	NY: W. W. Norton & Company	1966 UK edition (Lutterworth Press)	
Walsh, John	The Truants and other Poems for Children	1965	London: Heinemann	1968 UK edition (Chicago: Rand McNally)	
Clark, Leonard	The Year Round	1965	London: Rupert Hart-Davis		
Webster, Jean	Daddy-Long-Legs	1966	Leicester: Brockhampton Press	1979 US edition (NY: Meredith)	The book was 1st published in 1912
Marshall, Archibald	The Dragon	1966	London: Hamish Hamilton	1967 US edition (NY: Dutton)	
Farjeon, Eleanor	The Eleanor Farjeon Book: A Tribute to her Life and Work 1881-1965	1966	London: Hamish Hamilton	1966 US edition (NY: Henry Z. Walck)	introduction by Naomi Lewis
Streatfeild, Noel	The Growing Summer	1966	London: Collins	1967 US edition as The Magic Summer (NY: Random House) 1968 UK paperback (Penguin / Puffin) 2000 UK paperback (Collins)	
Langley, Noel	The Land of Green Ginger	1966	Harmondsworth: Penguin / Puffin	1975 Revised Penguin edition 1977 Hardback edition with the 1966 text (London: Kestrel) 2001 edition of the 1975 revised text (Faber Children's Classics)	
Ardizzone, Aingelda	The Little Girl and the Tiny Doll	1966	London: Constable Young Books	1967 US edition (NY: Delacorte) 1973 edition (Longman Young Books, with dust jacket) 1978 4th printing (Kestrel Books) 1979 2nd edition (Penguin / Puffin)	Translations: Afrikaans
Nesbit, E.	Long Ago When I Was Young	1966	London: Ronald Whiting & Wheaton	1966 US edition(NY: Franklin Watts) 1974 reprint (Macdonald & Jane's) 1987 Larger format reprint (London: Beehive Books)	
Wahl, Jan	The Muffletumps	1966	NY: Holt, Rinehart & Winston		not published in the UK
Reeves, James	The Secret Shoemakers and Other Stories	1966	London: Abelard-Schuman	1967 US edition: NY: Abelard-Schuman 1969 UK paperback (Penguin / Young Puffin)	
Wuorio, Eva-Lis	Kali and the Golden Mirror	1967	NY: The World Publishing Company		not published in the UK
Fox, Paula	A Likely Place	1967	NY: The Macmillan Company	1967 UK edition (London: Macmillan) 1989 US school edition (Boston: Houghton Mifflin)	
Estes, Eleanor	Miranda the Great	1967	NY: Harcourt, Brace & World		not published in the UK
Brand, Christianna	Nurse Matilda Goes to Town	1967	Leicester: Brockhampton Press	1968 US edition (NY: Dutton) 1975 UK paperback (Hodder / Knight Books)	
Reeves, James	Rhyming Will	1967	London: Hamish Hamilton	1968 US edition (NY: McGraw-Hill)	Translations: Afrikaans
Symonds, John	The Stuffed Dog	1967	London: J. M. Dent & Sons Ltd		
Stevenson, Robert Louis	Travels with a Donkey in the Cevennes	1967	London: The Folio Society		Book 1st published in 1879
Defoe, Daniel	Robinson Crusoe	1968	London: The Nonesuch Press		Book 1st published in 1719
Clewes, Dorothy	Upside Down Willie	1968	London: Hamish Hamilton		
Reeves, James	The Angel and the Donkey	1969	London: Hamish Hamilton	1970 US edition (NY: McGraw-Hill)	Translations: Afrikaans
Chapman, Jean	Do You Remember What Happened	1969	London: Angus and Robertson	1973 UK abridged edition (London: Transworld)	
Sicotte, Virginia	A Riot of Quiet	1969	NY: Holt, Rinehart and Winston		not published in the UK
Clewes, Dorothy	Special Branch Willie	1969	London: Hamish Hamilton	1971 UK paperback (Armada)	
Lines, Kathleen (retold by)	Dick Whittington	1970	London: The Bodley Head	1970 US edition: Henry Z. Walck	
Clewes, Dorothy	Fire-Brigade Willie	1970	London: Hamish Hamilton		
Stevenson, Robert Louis	Home From Sea	1970	London: The Bodley Head		
Reeves, James	How the Moon Began	1971	London: Abelard-Schuman	1972 US edition (also Abelard-Schuman) & 1973 paperback	Translations: Japanese
Dickens, Charles	The Short Stories of Charles Dickens	1971	NY: Limited Editions Club		
Lines, Kathleen (ed.)	The Old Ballad of Babes in the Wood	1972	London: The Bodley Head	1972 US edition (NY: Henry Z. Walck)	
Morgan, Shirley	Rain, Rain Don't Go Away	1972	NY: E. P. Dutton & Co	1973 UK edition (London: Hutchinson Junior Books)	
Lavin, Mary	The Second-best Children in the World	1972	London: Longman Young Books	1972 US edition (Boston: Houghton Mifflin)	
Estes, Eleanor	The Tunnel of Hugsy Goode	1972	NY: Harcourt Brace Jovanovich		not published in the UK
Reeves, James	Complete Poems for Children	1973	London: Heinemann	1986 Reissue (St. Edmundsbury Press) 1987 paperback edition as The Wandering Moon and Other Poems (Penguin / Puffin) 1994 Reprint with additions including More Prefabulous Animiles 1998 and 2001 paperback (London: Mammoth)	
Greene, Graham	The Little Fire Engine	1973	London: The Bodley Head	1973 US edition (NY: Doubleday & Co) 1977 UK paperback (Puffin, Picture Puffins) 1980 Picture Puffin edition (smaller than the 1977) 2015 UK hardback (London: Red Fox)	Book was 1st published in 1950 (not Ardizzone illus.) Translations: Swedish, Afrikaans, Spanish, Japanese
Greene, Graham	The Little Train	1973	London: The Bodley Head)	1977 UK paperback (Puffin, Picture Puffins)	Book was 1st published in 1946 (not Ardizzone illus.) Translations: Norwegian, Swedish, German, Spanish, Japanese
Ardizzone, Aingelda	The Night Ride	1973	London: Longman Young Books	US edition (NY: Windmill Books)	
Bunyan, John	The Land of Beulah. Being an Extract from The Pilgrim's Progress	1974	London: The Bodley Head		Limited edition, 350 copies
Reeves, James	The Lion That Flew	1974	London: Chatto and Windus		
Greene, Graham	The Little Horse Bus	1974	London: The Bodley Head	1974 US edition (NY: Doubleday) 1994 UK reprint (London: Viking); also published as a Puffin Picture Book 2015 UK hardback (London: Red Fox)	Book was 1st published in 1952 (not Ardizzone illus.) Translations: Swedish, German, French, Japanese
Greene, Graham	The Little Steamroller	1974	London: The Bodley Head	1994 UK editions hardback (London: Viking) and paperback (Puffin)	Book was 1st published in 1953 (not Ardizzone illus.) Translations: Swedish, German, Japanese
Brand, Christianna	Nurse Matilda Goes to Hospital	1974	Leicester: Brockhampton Press	1985 2nd impression (London: Hodder & Stoughton) 1975 large print edition (Chivers)	
Reeves, James	More Prefabulous Animiles	1975	London: Heinemann		incorporated into the 1994 reprint of Complete Poems for Children by Reeves
Kilvert, Rev. Francis	Ardizzone's Kilvert: Selections from the Diary of the Rev. Francis Kilvert (1870-1879)	1976	London: Jonathan Cape		edited by William Plomer; abridged for children by Elizabeth Devine
Reeves, James	Arcadian Ballads	1977	Andoversford: The Whittington Press	1978 trade impression (London: Heinemann)	
Andersen, Hans Christian	Ardizzone's Hans Andersen	1978	1979 US edition (NY: Atheneum) 1989 revised edition		Selected and illustrated by Ardizzone; translated by Stephen Corrin Translations: Japanese
Thomas, Dylan	A Child's Christmas in Wales	1978	London: Dent	1980 US edition (Boston: Godine) 1983 Japanese learning English edition (Tokyo: Yamaguchi Shoten) 1986 UK paperback (London: Dent) 1993 miniature (London: Orion) 1996 paperback (Puffin Books)	Translations: Japanese, Welsh – Nadolig Plentyn yng Nghymru
Reeves, James	The James Reeves Story Book	1978	London: Heinemann	1986 paperback as The Gnome Factory and Other Stories (Penguin / Puffin)	
Daudet, Alphonse	Letters from My Windmill	1978	Harmondsworth: Penguin Books		translated and with an introduction by Frederick Davies
Jacobs, Joseph (from the collection of)	Ardizzone's English Fairy Tales: Twelve Classic Tales	1980	London: Andre Deutsch	1987 hardback and paperback 2nd impression	

== Other contributions to publications ==
In addition to the works Edward Ardizzone both penned and illustrated, and the works he fully illustrated, Ardizzone was also a regular contributor to periodicals, magazines and provided numerous cover, or dust jacket, illustrations for works by other authors. His contributions can be found in periodicals such as The Strand Magazine, Punch, Lilliput Magazine, The Saturday Book, and The Radio Times. Vogue magazine featured Ardizzone illustrations in their Coronation issue, June 1953. References to most of these works can be found in Brian Alderson's bibliography.

Ardizzone also produced illustrations for a number of companies for marketing, advertising and newsletter purposes, as well a few Christmas cards for commercial use. Companies he illustrated for include Guinness, the Arts Council, the Double Crown Club, Moss Bros., and John Harvey & Sons, Limited. His own personal Christmas cards can be found documented in My Father and Edward Ardizzone by Edward Booth-Clibborn.
