= Kathleen Lines =

Canadian writer (1902–1988)

Kathleen Mary Lines (24 September 1902 – 24 December 1988) was a book critic, editor, anthologist and librarian from Canada. An expert on children's literature, she wrote, compiled, and edited Four to Fourteen (1950) for the National Book League. She also wrote the introduction to the second edition of F. J. Harvey Darton's Children's Books in England (1958) and edited a series of illustrated fairy tale picture books. Artists for the picture books included Edward Ardizzone for the Bodley Head. Lines was also the general editor of the Bodley Head Monographs and edited Lavender's Blue (1954), a selection of classic nursery rhymes illustrated by Harold Jones. The book won a Carnegie special commendation.
