= Georg Ehrlich =

Austrian sculptor

- Born: 22 February 1897; Vienna, Austria-Hungary
- Died: 1 July 1966 (aged 69); Lucerne, Switzerland
- Education: Kunstgewerbeschule of Vienna
- Known for: sculpture
- Spouse: Bettina Ehrlich née Bauer
- Elected: ARA 1962

Georg Ehrlich ARA (22 February 1897 – 1 July 1966) was an Austrian sculptor. He lived in London from 1938 and became a British citizen in 1947.

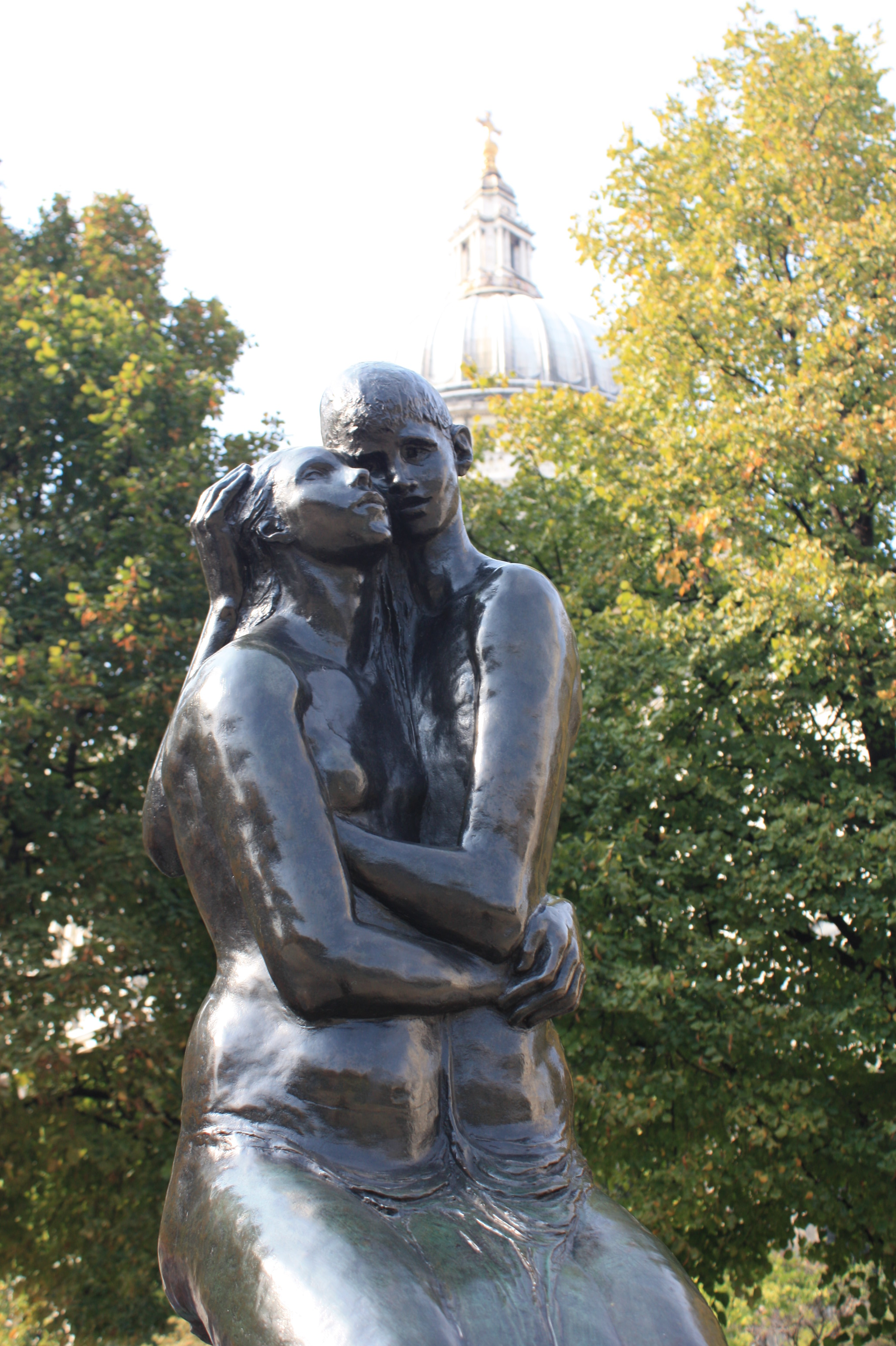
The Young Lovers, in the gardens of St Paul's Cathedral

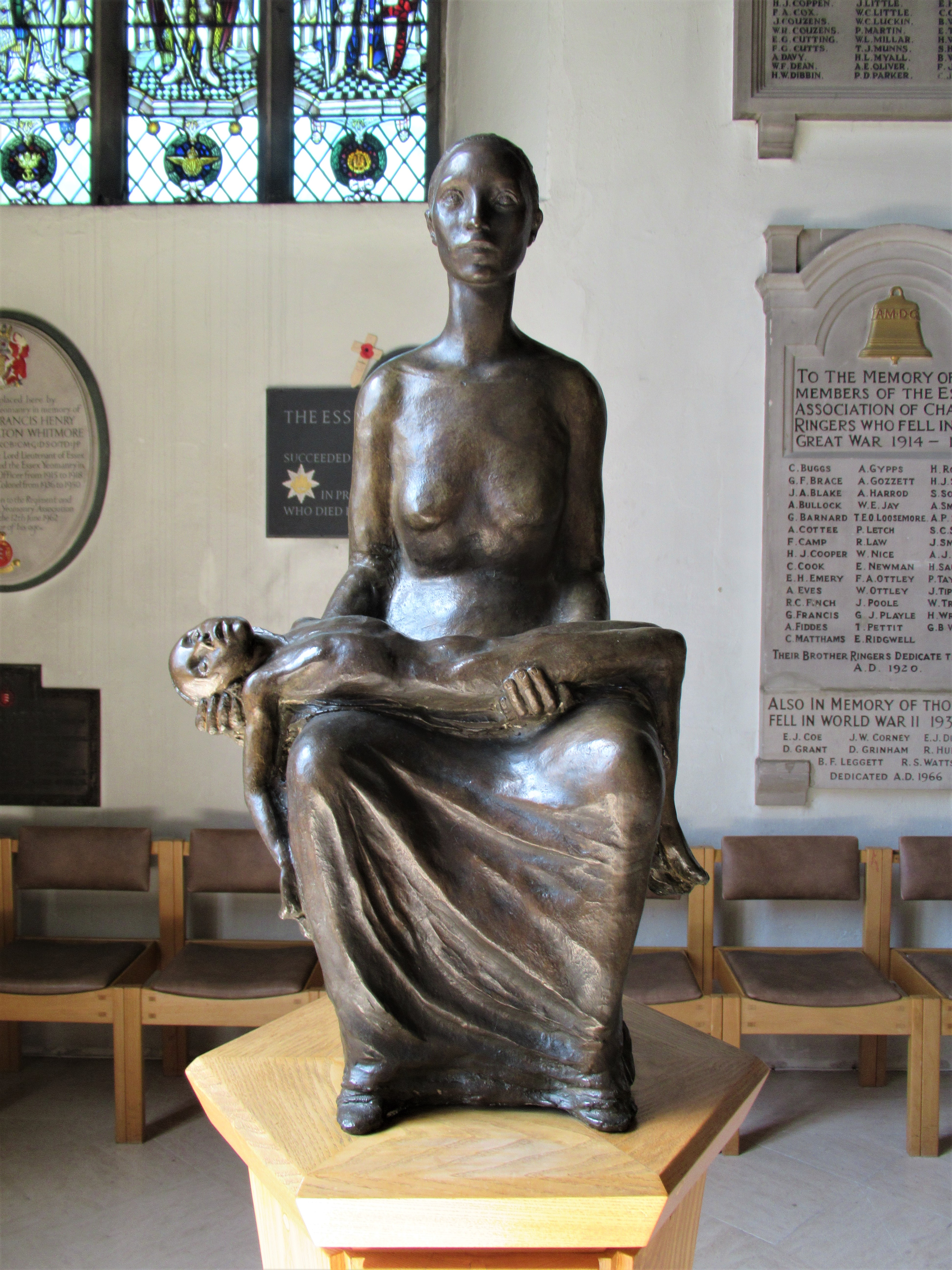
The Bombed Child, in Chelmsford Cathedral

== Life ==
Ehrlich was born in Vienna. From 1912 until 1915 he studied at the Kunstgewerbeschule, or school of arts and crafts, of Vienna, under the architect Oskar Strnad.

During the First World War he was called up and served in the Austrian Army 1915–1918. After the war he worked in lithography and etching. Because of the post-War economic depression in Austria he moved to Munich (1919–21) and then to Berlin (1921–23). He returned to Vienna in 1924, and his interest turned almost exclusively to sculpture.

On 27 November 1930 he married the artist Bettina Bauer, who like him, was Jewish. After the Nazi Anschluss in March 1938 it was too dangerous for them to be in Austria. He stayed in London, where he was at the time; his wife joined him there in July 1938, bringing many of his works. He became a British citizen in 1947. He was elected an Associate of the Royal Academy in 1962.

From 1951 Ehrlich suffered from heart problems. He moved to Italy in 1963, and then to Switzerland. He died in Lucerne on 1 July 1966 and was buried in Vienna.

== Exhibitions ==
Ehrlich exhibited in the Royal Academy ten times, including one posthumous exhibition in 1967. Other exhibitions include:

- ”Neue Kunst”, Galerie Hans Goltz, Munich, 1920
- Venice Biennale, (Austrian pavilion), 1932, 1934, 1936 and 1958
- Paris World Exposition, 1937 (gold medal)
- Matthiesen Gallery, London, 1939
- Sculpture in the Home, Arts Council Exhibition, 1946
- Leicester Galleries, 1950
- Royal Scottish Academy, 125th exhibition, 1951
- Aldeburgh Festival, 1964

== Works ==
Ehrlich has works in the Tate Gallery, British Arts Council, British Museum and Victoria and Albert Museum. His work The Young Lovers stands in St Paul's Cathedral garden, in London. Other works include:

- Italian Boy, 1935
- The Bombed Child, Chelmsford Cathedral, 1943
- Two Sisters, Essendon Scholl for Girls, 1944
- Benjamin Britten, private collection (plaster cast in the National Portrait Gallery, London 1951)
- Standing Boy, 1951
- Sick Boy, 1951
- Refugee, 1951
- Boy and Girl with a Puppy, Hastings High School, Burbage, Leicestershire, 1956
- Head of a Horse, 1956
- Full size bull, Vienna, 1960 (awarded Sculpture Prize of the City of Vienna)
- Peter Pears (plaster cast in the National Portrait Gallery, London 1963)
