= Bettina Ehrlich =

British painter

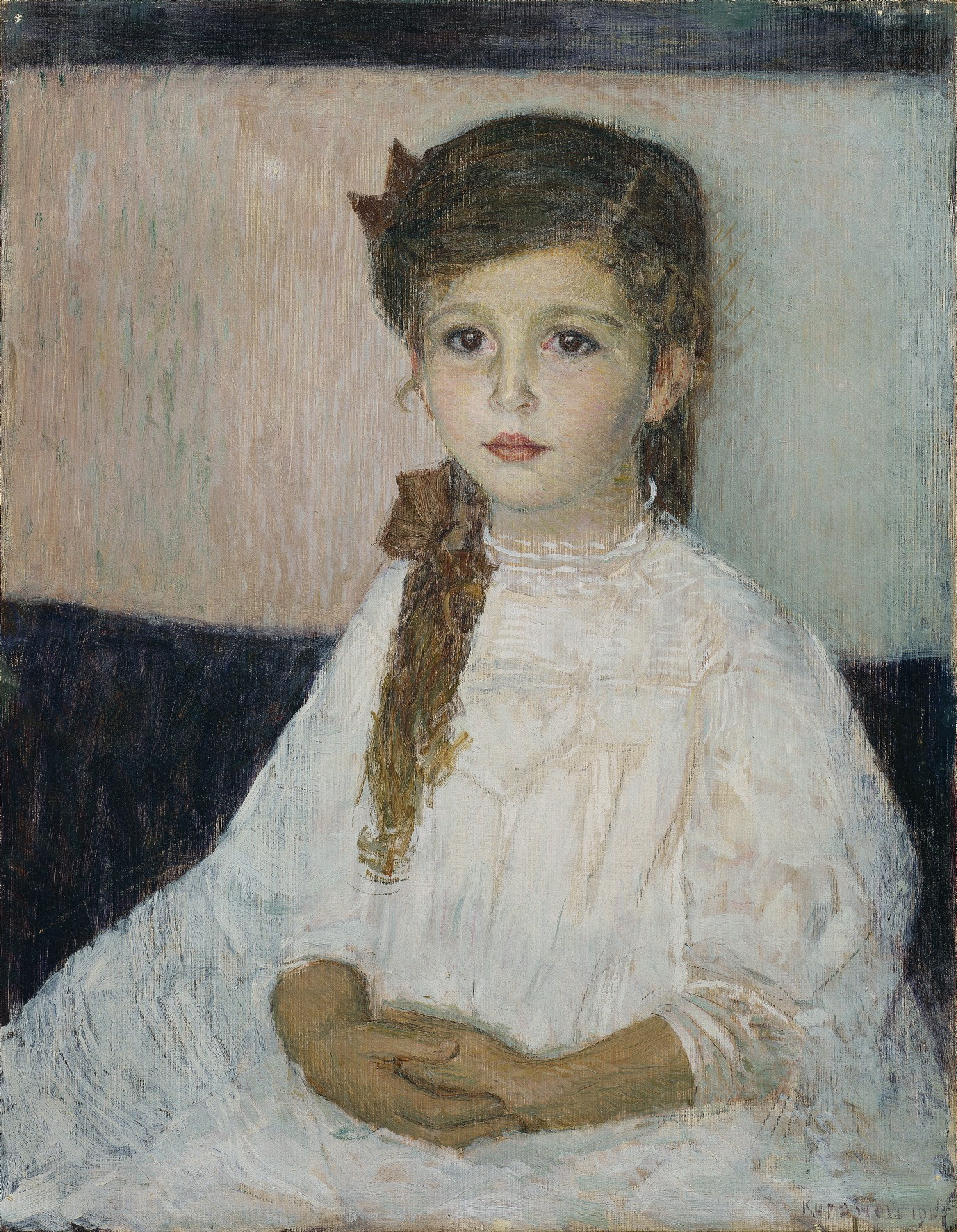
- Portrait of Bettina Bauer in 1907, by Max Kurzweil
- Born: Bettina Bauer; 10 March 1903; Vienna, Austria
- Died: 10 October 1985 (aged 82); London
- Spouse: Georg Ehrlich

Bettina Ehrlich, née Bauer, (10 March 1903 – 10 October 1985) was an Austrian painter and illustrator of children's books, many of which she also wrote. She lived briefly in Berlin and Paris, and from 1938 in England.

== Family and education ==
Bettina Bauer was born in Vienna, Austria, on 10 March 1903. She studied for three years at the Kunstgewerbeschule, or school of arts and crafts, of Vienna (now the University of Applied Arts). She lived in Berlin for two years and in Paris for one, and showed work in each city.

On 27 November 1930 she married the sculptor Georg Ehrlich; like her, he was Jewish. After the Nazi Anschluss in March 1938 it was too dangerous for them to be in Austria. Ehrlich was in England at the time, and stayed there; Bettina joined him in July 1938, bringing many of his works.

== Work ==
Ehrlich worked in many media, including watercolour, oils and various printing techniques (etching, lino-cutting, lithography and woodcut). At the Exposition Internationale des Arts et Techniques dans la Vie Moderne in Paris in 1937, she won a silver medal for her hand-painted silks.

Ehrlich began illustrating and writing books for children during the Second World War. Show Me Yours: A Little Paintbook and Poo-Tsee, the Water-Tortoise were both published by Chatto & Windus in 1943, under the pen name "Bettina". In all, she illustrated more than twenty, most of which she wrote herself.

She was an expert in the techniques of bronze casting and patination of bronze. After her husband died, in 1966, she produced casts from his plasticine and plaster models; they were of the same high quality as those he had made himself.

She died of lung cancer in a London hospital on 10 October 1985. She provided in her will for the remaining originals and casts from her husband's workshop to be returned to Vienna.

== Publications ==
Illustrated books for children, written by Bettina except where noted, include:

- Show Me Yours: A Little Paintbook 1943 (London: Chatto & Windus)
- Poo-Tsee, the Water-Tortoise 1943 (London: Chatto & Windus)
- Carmello 1945 (London: Chatto & Windus)
- Cocolo 1945 (London: Chatto & Windus)
- Cocolo Comes to America 1949 (Harper)
- Cocolo's Home 1950 (Harper) - "Elegant animal nonsense and a favorite animal character in a new Cocolo story."
- Castle in the Sand 1951 (New York: Harper & Brothers) - "... this story is permeated by a tired adult nostalgia for the super-imposed chivalry of innocent, pre-adolescent affection. As always, the author's illustrations in black and white are exquisite. Too precious for general."
- A Horse for the Island 1952 (London: Hamish Hamilton) - "A gentle fable which is not without its charm- but special."
- Piccolo 1954 (New York: Harper & Brothers)
- The Swans of Ballycastle 1954 (New York: Ariel-Farrar, Straus & Young)
- The Magic Christmas Tree, written by Lee Kingman, 1956 (Harper)
- Angelo and Rosaline 1957 (London: William Collins, Sons)
- Pantaloni 1957 (New York: Harper & Brothers) - "The muted colors and superb draughtsmanship of illustrations depicting village life and Italian temperament are a joy. The story moves very naturally toward a happy ending..."
- Trovato 1959 (New York: Farrar, Straus & Cudahy)
- For the Leg of a Chicken 1960 (London: Collins)
- Paolo and Panetto 1960 (London: Oxford University Press)
- Dolls 1962 (London: Oxford University Press)
- Francesco and Francesca 1962 (London: Oxford University Press)
- Of Uncles and Aunts 1963 (London: Oxford University Press)
- Tal and the Magic Rarruget, written by Eva-Lis Wuorio, 1965 (Cleveland: The World Publishing)
- The Goat Boy 1965 (London; Vienna: Oxford University Press)
- Sardines and the Angel 1967 (London: Oxford University Press)
- Neretto 1969 (London: Oxford University Press)
