= Gerald Cock =

British broadcasting executive (1887–1973)

- Born: 1887
- Died: 10 November 1973 (aged 85–86)
- Education: Tonbridge School
- Employer(s): British Broadcasting Company; British Broadcasting Corporation
- Title: Controller of BBC Television Service (1936-1939)

Gerald Cock MVO (1887 – 10 November 1973) was a British broadcasting executive, who initially worked for BBC Radio, before being made the corporation's very first Director of Television, in effect the very first Controller of the television channel initially known as the BBC Television Service but later renamed BBC1.

== Early life ==
After being educated at Tonbridge School and Seafield Park, Cock left the UK in 1909 to travel around North America. He went to British Columbia, the United States and Mexico, working variously in such jobs as a rancher, a gold miner and even as an extra in Hollywood films, before in 1915 returning to the UK due to the First World War. Cock joined the Royal Engineers and served in France and later Belgium, being promoted to the rank of captain in 1917.

== Career ==
Cock left the army in 1920 and worked in various jobs in London, before joining the newly formed British Broadcasting Company (later Corporation). As the BBC began to extend its radio service throughout the country and provide a greater scope and variety of programmes, Cock was appointed as its first Director of Outside Broadcasts in 1925. He organised several new and ambitious events, such as the coverage of live sporting events and the increasing competition with the newspapers for coverage of important news, as well as encouraging the development of new techniques and technologies.

In 1935, possibly because of his enthusiasm for new broadcasting techniques, Cock was asked if he would like to become the BBC's Director of Television, as the corporation was planning to introduce a new regular service using this medium the following year. Cock accepted, and this placed him charge of establishing the world's very first regular high-definition television service from scratch.

Based at the BBC's new television studios in a specially converted section of Alexandra Palace in London, Cock and his team thought that they had several months to learn about what making television would involve before the planned launch in November 1936, but soon after the initial meeting he was informed that programmes would be required for the Radiolympia exhibition in August, which was then only ten days away.

Despite the tight schedule, Cock and his team were able to prepare several sample programmes, and the Radiolympia event was a great success in advertising the potential of the new medium and encouraging the audience to purchase sets in the run-up to the launch proper. On 2 November 1936 that launch took place, the new television service broadcasting in theory only within a twenty-five-mile radius of Alexandra Palace, although in practice the transmissions could be picked up a good deal further afield than this.

Initially two competing technical systems, the Marconi 405-line and the Baird 210-line intermediate film system, were used in alternate weeks, but the Marconi system was vastly superior and Baird's was quickly abandoned. Cock oversaw an increasingly ambitions programme of scheduling including various variety shows, the popular magazine programme Picture Page, and an increasingly varied number of dramas. These achievements are all the more impressive when it is considered that, apart from a couple of demonstration films and some newsreels, everything had to be transmitted live as at the time no broadcast-quality format existed for the recording of television programmes.

Cock also made impressive forays into outside broadcasts, including coverage on 12 May 1937 of the coronation parade of King George VI, which used every single camera the television service had available and a huge length of cable to relay the pictures back to Alexandra Palace for broadcast. He also established the coverage of prominent sporting events, including the first ever televising of Wimbledon (21 June 1937), the Boat Race (2 April 1938), the FA Cup Final (30 April 1938) and test match cricket (24 June 1938). Major live news events also began to be covered – BBC television cameras were present when Neville Chamberlain returned from Munich to deliver his infamous "peace in our time" speech in October 1938.

This increasingly varied and ambitious schedule put together by Cock and his small but inventive team of producers meant that television very quickly grew in popularity, despite at the time being an expensive luxury limited to the London area. By September 1939 there were estimated to be 25,000 television sets in use – however, that month also saw the BBC Television Service unceremoniously shut down by the government for the duration of the war, following the broadcasting of a Mickey Mouse cartoon on 1 September, two days before hostilities commenced. There were two main reasons for this – the first and principal reason was the fear that German bombers could use the VHF transmission waves of television as a perfect guiding beam for homing into the centre of London. However, there was also a great need for many of the technical and engineering staff of the service to be used on war efforts such as the radar programme, and so the young BBC Television Service was blacked-out until 1946.

During the war, with no television service to run, Cock was appointed as the North American representative of the BBC in New York City from 1940 to 1941, and then later from 1942 to 1945 was the corporation's Pacific Coast representative, working in California. While in the USA he took the opportunity of seeing the developments made in television broadcasting by the new American broadcasters, compiling a report upon his return home to the UK entitled "Report on the Conditions For a Post-War Television Service." Although this report was very important in helping to re-establish the BBC Television Service in 1946, Cock did not return to control it. Instead he had retired, as he was in poor health, although he went on to live in retirement until his death in 1973.

Media offices
Preceded by New position	Controller of BBC Television Service; 1936-1939	Succeeded by Maurice Gorham
