= Mathilda Wrede =

Finnish evangelist and baroness

Baroness Mathilda Wrede
- Portrait of Mathilda Wrede by Eero Järnefelt
- Born: Mathilda Wrede af Elimä; March 8, 1864; Vaasa, Grand Duchy of Finland, Russian Empire
- Died: December 25, 1928 (aged 64); Helsinki, Finland
- Occupations: Philanthropist, prison reformer
- Known for: Evangelism and social work with prisoners and former convicts
- Parent: Carl Gustaf Fabian Wrede (father)
- Family: Wrede af Elimä

Mathilda Wrede af Elimä (March 8, 1864, Vaasa – December 25, 1928), was a Finnish evangelist and baroness, known for being a precursor in the rehabilitation of prisoners, and known in Finland as "Friend of the prisoners".

== Life ==
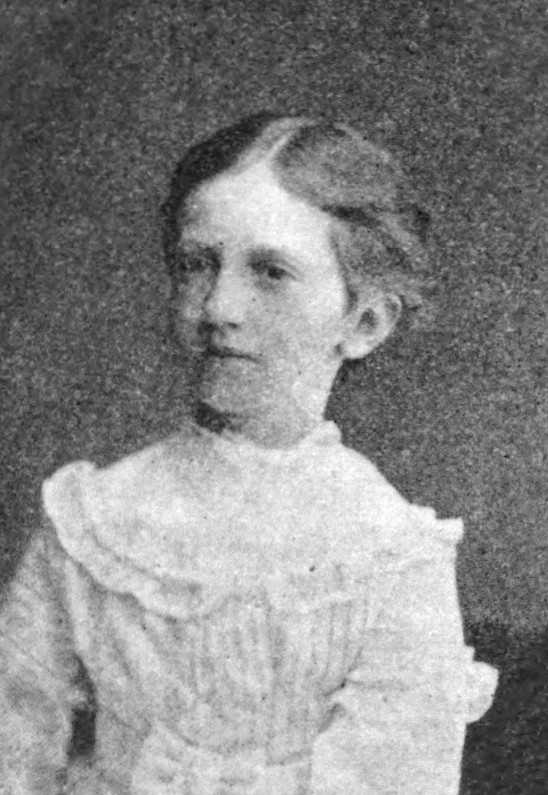
Wrede at age 7

Her father, Carl Gustaf Fabian Wrede, was the provincial governor of the Vaasa province. It was during this time she first came in contact with inmates, that were sent to the governor's house to make repairs.

At the age of 19 she experienced a religious revival and started to work for those less fortunate. She felt that the curing of inmates souls was her calling. She visited prisons, discussed religious issues, arranged occasions to hold speeches and discuss the Bible, distributed religious literature and was in direct correspondence with many of the inmates. This exceeded many of the social rules that was thought to be appropriate for a young woman of her stature. Matilda Wrede worked alone and in a way that differed a lot from the charity work done by other women in a position like hers.

In 1886 she founded Toivola, a farm for unemployed, newly released prisoners to work at. Henrik Wrede, her brother had earlier spent three years in Siberia, evangelizing the local people and Finnish criminals deported there.

Because of her social position she managed to get support for her work among Europe's nobility.

=== Biography ===
A published biography of Mathilda Wrede was written by the author and biographer H. J. Kaeser, a German of Jewish descent who in 1934 fled Nazi Germany to France, Denmark, and finally Sweden. Kaeser became a Swedish citizen and began writing in Swedish.
