= Jan Wahl =

American writer (1931–2019)

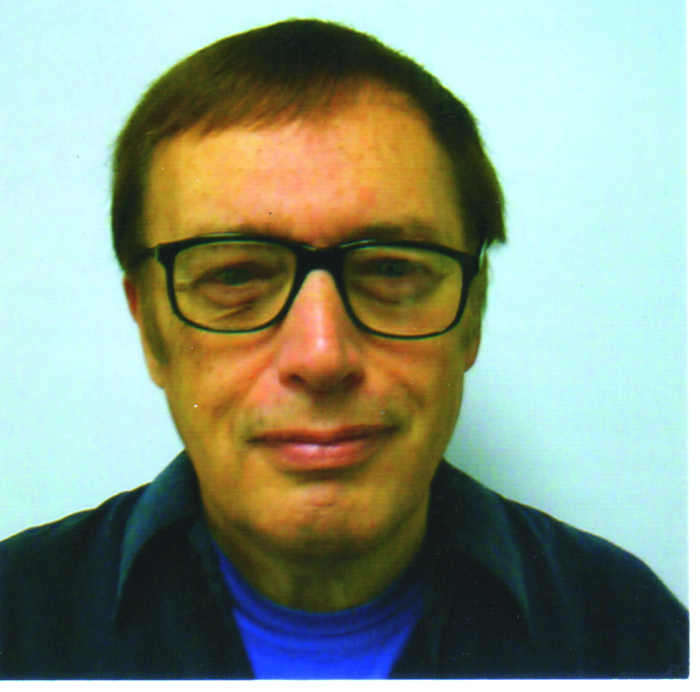
- Wahl in 2011
- Born: Jan Boyer Wahl; April 1, 1931; Columbus, Ohio, U.S.
- Died: January 29, 2019 (aged 87); Toledo, Ohio, U.S.
- Education: University of Michigan
- Occupation: Children's Literature Author/Film Historian

Jan Boyer Wahl (April 1, 1931 – January 29, 2019) was an American children's author. He was a prolific author of over 120 works, and was known primarily for his award-winning children's books, including Pleasant Fieldmouse, The Furious Flycycle, and Humphrey's Bear. Wahl sometimes jokingly referred to himself as "Dr. Mouse", a nickname given him by a young fan.

== Personal and background ==
Jan (pronounced "Yahn") Wahl was born in Columbus, Ohio. His father was physician Russell Rothenburger, and his mother was Nina Marie Boyer Wahl. He had five brothers. Wahl contended that his brother Phil Wahl's exploits shooting commercials in Japan was part of the real-life inspirations for the character played by Bill Murray in the film Lost In Translation (2003), directed by Sofia Coppola. Phil Wahl was once manager of the Augusta National Golf Club. Another brother, Robert C. Wahl, also authored novels and children's books.

As a child he played piano on a radio program called The Kiddies Karnival; the show also featured singer/actress Teresa Brewer. In addition, he once appeared at the Toledo Town Hall theater with the legendary magician Harry Blackstone Sr. He received a B.A. from Cornell University in 1953 where he took classes from Vladimir Nabokov. His Graduate studies were at the University of Copenhagen (Fulbright scholar, 1953–1954) and the University of Michigan (M.A., 1958). During his studies he wrote plays that were produced (such as Paradiso! Paradiso! ) and short stories (such as the award-winning Seven Old Maids).

After many years in parts of Europe, New York City, and then Mexico, Wahl made his home in Toledo, Ohio, where he died on January 29, 2019 from complications of metastatic cancer.

== Professional ==
Wahl's career was both varied and adventurous. He began authoring and publishing children's books in 1964, achieving both artistic and commercial success immediately with the now classic books Pleasant Fieldmouse, Cabbage Moon, Cobweb Castle, and others. Noted artists such as John Alcorn (artist), Edward Gorey, Steven Kellog, Mercer Mayer, Norman Rockwell, Maurice Sendak, and others illustrated his picture books. He soon added story books to his output with the provocative How The Children Stopped The Wars. Wahl quickly developed a reputation for playful, empowering narratives with intriguing characters. Over time, his works demonstrated mastery of a wide variety of topics and styles. He gave many readings and presentations of his books as well as lecturing on writing.

Hedy and Her Amazing Invention (2019); the story of actress Hedy Lamarr's co-invention of what is now known as Frequency-hopping spread spectrum was his last book published while he was alive.

In 2025, Movie Girls: Lillian and Dorothy, the story of how the Gish Sisters met Mary Pickford and D.W. Griffith and began acting in motion pictures was published. It was illustrated by Rick Geary.

Included among his other exploits was spending several months working with noted filmmaker Carl Theodor Dreyer during the filming of Ordet (The Word); the story of which Wahl recounted in the book Carl Theodore Dreyer and Ordet. Later he was the personal secretary to Isak Dinesen (Karen Blixen) as she worked on what became Last Tales. He was also involved with Keith Lampe in the early days of the Yippies. In addition, he befriended actress Louise Brooks and some of his correspondence with Brooks was collected in the volume Dear Stinkpot: Letters from Louise Brooks. While in Mexico, he was an on-set script doctor (uncredited) for The Wrath of God (1972) starring Robert Mitchum and Rita Hayworth during its filming. Later, he was also an early consultant on what became Fraggle Rock.

In addition, Wahl was well known as a film historian and collector of films and film history related artifacts and gave lectures and presentations for numerous venues over many years. On March 15, 1996, Bowling Green State University in Bowling Green, Ohio awarded Wahl the honorary degree Doctor of Letters in recognition of his continuing work in children's literature and in the history of film. Around that time he began presenting introductory lectures for the Sunday Classic Film Series at the Dorothy and Lillian Gish Film Theater and Gallery at BGSU, with over one-hundred-fifty presentations to his credit there through the Spring Semester of 2018 when the series ended. Most of the programs consisted of films from his private collection.

== Published works ==
Note: Many of Wahl's works have been republished, some multiple times. Only special instances have been noted here. Several volumes have also been published in Chinese, Dutch, French, German, Italian, Japanese, Korean, Russian, Spanish, and Swedish language editions. The following lists, though extensive, are not necessarily complete.

== Picture books ==
=== 1960s ===
- The Beast Book (1964)
- Hello Elephant (New York: Holt, Rinehart and Winston, 1964) illustrated by Edward Ardizzone
- The Howards Go Sledding (1964)
- Cabbage Moon (1965) (Illustrated by Adrienne Adams; 1998 Illustrated by Arden Johnson-Petrov)
- Christmas in the Forest (1965)
- Pocahontas In London (1967) (Illustrated by John Alcorn (artist))
- Cobweb Castle (1968) (Illustrated by Edward Gorey)
- Push Kitty (1968)
- Rickety Rackety Rooster (1968)
- Runaway Jonah and Other Tales (1968) (Illustrated by Uri Shulevitz; 1985 Illustrated by Jane Conteh-Morgan and titled Runaway Jonah and Other Biblical Adventures) (Also released in 1985 on vinyl and cassette, read by E. G. Marshall)
- The Fisherman (1969)
- May Horses (1969)
- The Norman Rockwell Storybook (1969) (Illustrated by Norman Rockwell)
- A Wolf of My Own (1969)

=== 1970s ===
- The Animals' Peace Day (1970) (This book is the basis for the animated short Why We Need Each Other or The Animals' Picnic Day (1972))
- The Mulberry Tree (1970)
- The Prince Who Was A Fish (1970)
- The Wonderful Kite (1970) (Illustrated by Uri Shulevitz)
- Abe Lincoln's Beard (1971) (Illustrated by Fernando Krahn)
- Anna Help Ginger (1971)
- Crabapple Night (1971) (Illustrated by Steven Kellog)
- Lorenzo Bear & Company (1971)
- Margaret's Birthday (1971) (Illustrated by Mercer Mayer)
- Cristobal and The Witch (1972)
- Magic Heart (1972)
- Grandmother Told Me (1972) (Illustrated by Mercer Mayer)
- The Very Peculiar Tunnel (1972) (Illustrated by Steven Kellog)
- Crazy Brobobalou (1973)
- The Five In The Forest (1974)
- Jeremiah Knucklebones (1974)
- Juan Diego and The Lady (1974)
- Mooga Mega Mekki: The Story of A Stone Age Boy (1974)
- The Woman With The Eggs (1974)
- The Clumpets Go Sailing (1975) (Illustrated by Cyndy Szekeres)
- Bear, Wolf, and Mouse (1975) (Illustrated by Kinuko Y. Craft)
- Follow Me Cried Bee (1976)
- Grandpa's Indian Summer (1976)
- Carrot Nose (1978)
- Drakestail (1978)
- Jamie's Tiger (1978)
- Sylvester Bear Overslept (1979) (Illustrated by Lee Lorenz)
- The Teeny, Tiny Witches (1979)

=== 1980s ===
- Button Eye's Orange (1980)
- Old Hippo's Easter Egg (1980)
- The Cucumber Princess (1981)
- Grandpa Gus's Birthday Cake (1981)
- The Little Blind Goat (1981)
- Tiger Watch (1983)
- So Many Racoons (1985)
- Rabbits On Roller Skates! (1986)
- The Toy Circus (1986) (Illustrated by Tim Bowers)
- The Musicians of Hootsville (1987)
- Humphrey's Bear (1988) (Illustrated by William Joyce)
- The Adventures of the Underwater Dog (1989) (Illustrated by Tim Bowers)

=== 1990s ===
- My Cat Ginger (1990)
- The Rabbit Club (1990) (Illustrated by Tim Bowers)
- Mrs. Owl and Mr. Pig (1991)
- Tailypo! (1991)
- Little Eight John (1992)
- Sleepytime Book (1992)
- Suzy and the Mouse King (1992)
- Little Gray One (1993)
- Will Santa Come? (1993)
- Cats and Robbers (1995)
- Emily and the Snowflake (1995)
- "I Remember" Cried Grandma Pinky (1995)
- Jack Rabbit and the Giant (1996)
- Once When The World Was Green (1996)
- I Met A Dinosaur (1997)
- The Singing Geese (1998)
- Christmas Present (1999)
- Rosa's Parrot (1999)
- Little Johnny Buttermilk (1999)

=== 2000s ===
- The Fieldmouse and the Dinosaur Named Sue (2000)
- Mabel Ran Away with the Toys (2000)
- Three Pandas (2000)
- Elf Night (2002)
- Rabbits On Mars (2003)
- Knock! Knock! (2004)
- Candy Shop (2005)
- The Enchanted Sled (2005)
- Bear Dance (2008)

=== 2010s ===
- The Art Collector (2011)
- The Long Tall Journey (2015)
- The Hunter (2018)

== Picture Book Series ==
=== Pleasant Fieldmouse Series ===
- Pleasant Fieldmouse (1964) (Illustrated by Maurice Sendak)
- The Six Voyages of Pleasant Fieldmouse (1971) (Illustrated by Peter Parnall; 1994 Illustrated by Tim Bowers)
- Pleasant Fieldmouse's Halloween Party (1974) (Illustrated by Wallace Tripp)
- Pleasant Fieldmouse Story Book (1977)
- Pleasant Fieldmouse's Valentine Trick (1977)

=== Muffletumps Series ===
- The Muffletumps: The Story of Four Dolls (1966) illustrated by Edward Ardizzone
- The Muffletump Storybook (1975)
- The Muffletumps' Christmas Party (1975)
- The Muffletumps' Hallowe'en Scare (1979)

=== Doctor Rabbit Series ===
- Doctor Rabbit (1970)
- Doctor Rabbit's Foundling (1977)
- Doctor Rabbit's Lost Scout (1988)

=== Horror Pet Series ===
- Frankenstein's Dog (1977) (Republished with Dracula's Cat as a single volume in 1990)
- Dracula's Cat (1978) (Republished with Frankenstein's Dog as a single volume in 1990)

=== Pipkins Series ===
- The Pipkins Go Camping (1982)
- More Room For The Pipkins (1983)

=== Golden Book Imprints ===
- Peter and The Troll Baby (1984) (A Golden Book)
- Cheltenham's Party (1986) (Little Golden Reader Special Editions)
- Let's Go Fishing (1987) (A Big Little Golden Book)
- The Golden Christmas Tree (1988) (A Big Little Golden Book)
- Little Dragon's Grandmother (1988) (A Golden Storytime Book)
- Tales of Fuzzy Mouse (1988) (A Golden Book)
- Timothy Tiger's Terrible Toothache (1988) (A Little Golden Book)
- The Wizard of Oz Movie Storybook (1989) (A Golden Book)

== Early Reader/Chapter Books ==
- How the Children Stopped the Wars (1969)
- Youth's Magic Horn: Seven Stories (1978)
- Needle and Noodle and Other Silly Stories (1979)
- The Screeching Door, or, What Happened At The Elephant Hotel (1979); (Republished in 2011 as The Screeching Door: Three Spooky Tales with new additional story)
- A Gift For Miss Milo (1990)
- Hedy and Her Amazing Invention (2019)
- The Movie Girls: Lillian and Dorothy (2025) (Illustrated by Rick Geary)

=== Melvin Spitznagle Series ===
- The Furious Flycycle (1968) (This book was the basis for an animated short of the same name in 1980)
- S.O.S. Bobomobile (1973)

=== Tim Kitten Series ===
- Great-Grandmother Cat Tales (1976)
- Who Will Believe Tim Kitten? (1978)
- Tim Kitten and the Red Cupboard (1990) (Picture Book)

== Adult Nonfiction ==
- Through a Lens Darkly (2008) (Wahl's autobiographical memoirs)
- Dear Stinkpot: Letters from Louise Brooks (2010) (Wahl's commentary on and reprints of his correspondence with the noted actress)
- Carl Theodor Dreyer and Ordet (2012) (Wahl's recollections of his time working with the famed director and some of the director's film-theory essays)

== Awards ==
- Avery Hopwood Prize in Short Story Fiction for Seven Old Maids, University of Michigan (1955)
- Young Critic's Award, Bologna International Children's Book Fair for Pocahontas in London (1969)
- Ohioana Book Award for The Norman Rockwell Storybook (1970)
- Parents' Choice Literary Award for Tiger Watch (1987)
- Ohioana Book Award for Humphrey's Bear (1987)
- Redbook Award for Humphrey's Bear (1987)
- Christopher Medal for Humphrey's Bear (1988)
- Coretta Scott King Book Award: Illustrator Honor for Little Eight John (1993)
