= James Reeves (writer) =

British writer (1909–1978)

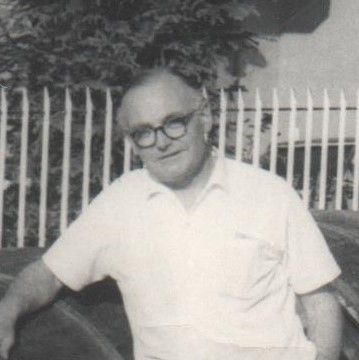
- James Reeves
- Born: John Morris Reeves; 1 July 1909; Wealdstone, London Borough of Harrow, England
- Died: 1 May 1978 (aged 68); Lewes, Sussex, England
- Education: Jesus College, Cambridge
- Occupation: Writer
- Parent(s): Ethel Blench and Albert Reeves
- Writing career
- Period: 1936–1978
- Genres: Poetry, plays, children's literature, anthologies

John Morris Reeves, known as James Reeves (1 July 1909 – 1 May 1978) was a British writer principally known for his poetry, plays and contributions to children's literature and the literature of collected traditional songs. His published books include poetry, stories and anthologies for both adults and children. He was also well known as a literary critic and a broadcaster.

== Biography ==
John Morris Reeves was born in the London Borough of Harrow, elder son of Albert John Reeves, a company secretary, and Ethel Mary, née Blench. He attended Nevill House school at Eastbourne, then Stowe School, where he won a scholarship to Jesus College, Cambridge. From 1932 to 1952, he taught English in a number of schools and teachers' training colleges, subsequently becoming a freelance author and editor.

His first collection of poems, The Natural Need, was published in 1936 by the Seizin Press, run by Robert Graves and Laura Riding, whose work Reeves's early poetry sometimes resembles. Numerous further volumes by Reeves include The Imprisoned Sea (1949), The Talking Skull (1958), and Poems and Paraphrases (1972). Collected Poems of 1974 is the fullest edition of his verses. The rural descriptiveness of his less distinguished poetry is elsewhere the vehicle for an ironic pastoralism voicing his disaffection with urban modernity. His books of poetry for children were collected as The Wandering Moon and Other Poems (1973).

As an editor, Reeves was prolific, producing many anthologies of prose and poetry, as well as selections from the work of John Donne, Gerard Manley Hopkins, John Clare, and others, including Selected Poems of Emily Dickinson (1959). In this latter book, reprinted several times, he chose to add conventional punctuation to the poems, doing away with her characteristic dashes.

One of his most outstanding poems is "Sky, Sea, Shore":

Stars in a frosty sky
Crackle and blaze;
Streams in the lowland meadows
Linger and laze;
Shells on the sea shore gleam,
Washed by the tide;
Seagulls over the harbour
Circle and glide.
Blue smoke and prancing steed,
Swallow and snake and swan –
How many more
Curving, glistening S-things
In sky, sea, shore?

== Bibliography ==
- The Wandering Moon (1950)
- "The Merry-Go-Round": A Collection of Rhymes and Poems for Children (Heinemann, 1955)
- Pigeons and Princesses (Heinemann, 1956)
- Prefabulous Animiles, illustrated by Edward Ardizzone (Heinemann, 1957)
- A Golden Land (Constable, 1958), editor
- The Idiom of the People (Heinemann, 1958), folk song lyrics collected by Cecil Sharp.
- Exploits of Don Quixote (Blackie, 1959)
- The Everlasting Circle: English traditional verse (Heinemann, 1960), folk song lyrics collected by Sabine Baring-Gould, George Gardiner and Henry Hammond
- Ragged Robin, Poems (1961), illustrated by Jane Paton
- Georgian Verse (1962), editor
- Sailor Rumbelow and Britannia (1962), illustrated by Edward Ardizzone
- The Questioning Tiger (1964), poems
- The Story of Jackie Thimble (1965), illustrated by Edward Ardizzone
- Selected Poems (Allison & Busby, 1967)
- The Cold Flame (1967), children's novel based on a Grimm fairy tale
- Understanding Poetry (1967)
- The Christmas Book, with Raymond Briggs (1968)
- Sayings of Dr. Johnson (John Baker, 1968)
- Commitment to Poetry (1969)
- Inside Poetry, with Martin Seymour-Smith (1970)
- Maildun the Voyager (1971)
- Poems and Paraphrases (1972)
- Complete Poems for Children, illustrated by Edward Ardizzone (Faber, 1973)
- A Vein of Mockery: Twentieth-century Verse (1973)
- The Forbidden Forest (William Heinemann, 1973)
- Collected Poems 1929–1974 (1974)
- More Prefabulous Animiles (1975), poems, with illustrations by Edward Ardizzone
- The Reputation and Writings of Alexander Pope (1976)
- The Closed Door (The Gruffyground Press, 1977), poems
- Arcadian Ballads (Whittington Press, 1978), poems
- The Sea
- Explores
- Underground
- The Wife And The Ghost
- Sky, Sea, Shore
