= John Symonds =

English novelist (1914-2006)

John Symonds (12 March 1914 – 21 October 2006) was an English writer known for his biographies of Aleister Crowley, as well as novels, plays, and children's books. His literary career spanned several decades, covering a wide range of genres and subjects.

Symonds met Crowley in 1946 and became his literary executor, later writing multiple biographies, including The Great Beast (1952) and The Magic of Aleister Crowley (1958). While initially intrigued, he grew critical of Crowley’s practices, particularly regarding sex and drug use.

Beyond his Crowley biographies, Symonds wrote fiction and children’s books, such as The Magic Currant Bun (1953).

== Biography ==
=== Early life ===
John Symonds was born on 12 March 1914 in Battersea, London, the son of Robert Wemyss Symonds and Lily Sapzells. At the age of 16 he moved to London and began educating himself by spending long hours in the reading room of the British Museum. A partial reconciliation with his father resulted in the latter funding research work that John Symonds would mine for his own novels later in life.

His first job was at Hulton Press, where he worked as a journalist on Picture Post and during this period he became friends with Dylan Thomas and Stephen Spender. Being exempted from military service, he helped to edit 'Lilliput' magazine. During this time he had a brief marriage with Hedwig Feurstein.

=== Career ===
In 1945 he married the psychotherapist and counsellor Renata Symonds (1912-2007), and the following year (1946) he published his first novel, William Waste. This was followed in 1955 by The Lady in the Tower, and, in 1957, by another love story, A Girl Among Poets, which won praise from Sir John Betjeman, who wrote of the author's "gift for describing farcical situations".

Symonds met the occultist and founder of the Thelemite religion, Aleister Crowley in 1946, the year before Crowley's death. Crowley's will left the copyright of his works to his unincorporated magical society, Ordo Templi Orientis (O.T.O.), and made him Crowley's literary executor, though Crowley's legal status as an undischarged bankrupt meant that the copyrights actually ended up in receivership. At first fascinated by Crowley, Symonds became increasingly critical of his ideas and manners, in particular the use of drugs and sex. Along with one of Crowley's disciples, Kenneth Grant, Symonds edited and republished Crowley's autobiography and a number of his other works. Further to this, he authored four biographical works of his own: The Great Beast (1952), The Magic of Aleister Crowley (1958), The King of the Shadow Realm (1989) and The Beast 666 (1997). Due to his somewhat negative attitude to Crowley in these works, there were many involved in Thelema and ceremonial magic who were themselves critical of Symonds, including Israel Regardie, who called him "that most hostile biographer." Nonetheless, his significance in keeping Crowley's legacy alive has also been recognised, and it has been noted that "Regardless of his reception, it is no exaggeration to state that without the publication efforts of Symonds (and Grant) Crowley could easily have been a forgotten figure by the 1970s."

He found his widest (largest) audience in the writing of children's books. In 'The Magic Currant Bun', (1953), a boy chases a magic bun, which came out of an oven, through the streets of Paris He enjoyed the bun very much when he caught it in his mouth. His feline magical fantasy, Isle of Cats (illustrated by Gerard Hoffnung), followed in 1955. Lottie (1957), is the story of a talking doll and dog. Edward Ardizzone was the illustrator for this book and Elfrida and the Pig (1959), a story about little girl who is not allowed to play with dolls until she finished her punishment which was to trim her parents' bushes.

After a period of writing children's books Symonds returned to biographies in 1959 with Madame Blavatsky, Medium and Magician, a life of the famous Theosophist. This was followed in 1961 with Thomas Brown and the Angels: A Study in Enthusiasm, about the life of a Methodist who becomes involved with the Shakers.

Novels followed, beginning with William Waste (1947), The Lady in the Tower (1955), A Girl Among Poets (1957), then a gothic fantasy, Bezill (1962), then Light Over Water (1963), in which a journalist researches into the world of the occult. The subject of With a View on the Palace (1966) is a Russian film director who becomes obsessed with the Royal Family to the point of hiring an apartment near Buckingham Palace so he can observe their movements.

In The Stuffed Dog (1967), two girls discover a lifelike doll in an attic which has a man's voice. With 'In Prophesy and the Parasites', 1973, a wealthy widow awaits prospective [sic]. Psychological issues predominate in The Shaven Head (1974), and In Letters from England (1975), a German veteran of Stalingrad humbles himself by applying to work as an au pair for a London doctor. In The Child (1976), a girl starts a new religion.

Symonds wrote twenty-six plays but not many were performed. He won critical praise in 1961 for his ITV play, I, Having Dreamt, Awake, about a prodigal son and con-man who returns home from America, after manufacturing a fortune, to impress his poor relations in London. The Poison Maker, his final work for the stage was performed at the Old Red Lion Theatre in 2006, adapted and directed by the actress Vicki Carpenter who played Florence, with Eva Gray as Pansy.

In 1970 Symonds was appointed to the editorial board of Man, Myth & Magic Encyclopedia. He became literary executor to Gerald Hamilton, and, in 1974, published Conversations with Gerald, an account of Hamilton's adventures.

== Personal life and death ==
Symonds was married to his wife Renata for over 50 years. He died on 21 October 2006 and was buried on the east side of Highgate Cemetery. She died in 2007, aged 93. There were two sons: Gabriel, a physician, and Thomas, a publisher, and four grandchildren.

== Bibliography ==
=== Non-fiction ===
- The Great Beast. The Life of Aleister Crowley. London: Rider, 1951. 316pp., illus., with "Notes on the Horoscope of Aleister Crowley" by Rupert Gleadow & 'Bibliography of the Works of Aleister Crowley' compiled by Gerald Yorke.'
  - The Great Beast. The Life and Magick of Aleister Crowley. London: Macdonald, 1971. viii, 413 pp., prt., with "Notes on the Horoscope of Aleister Crowley" by Rupert Gleadow.
- The King of the Shadow Realm. Aleister Crowley his life and magic. London: Duckworth, 1989. xi, 588pp., with 'Notes on the Horoscope of Aleister Crowley' by Rupert Gleadow.
- The Beast 666. The Life of Aleister Crowley. London: The Pindar Press, 1997. x, 608pp., with 'Notes on the Horoscope of Aleister Crowley' by Rupert Gleadow.
- The Magic of Aleister Crowley. London: Frederick Muller, 1958.209pp., illus.

=== Fiction ===
- William Waste. London: Sampson Low, Marston, 1947. 184pp.
- The Lady in the Tower (1955)
- A Girl Among Poets (1957)
- Bezill (1962)
- Light Over Water (1963)
- The Medusa's Head (1991)

=== Children's books ===
- The Stuffed Dog (London: J. M. Dent & Sons, 1967), illustrated by Edward Ardizzone
