= James Kenward =

English writer and illustrator

James Macara Kenward (1908–1994), was an English writer and illustrator, best known for his accounts of suburban and prep school life.

== Biography ==
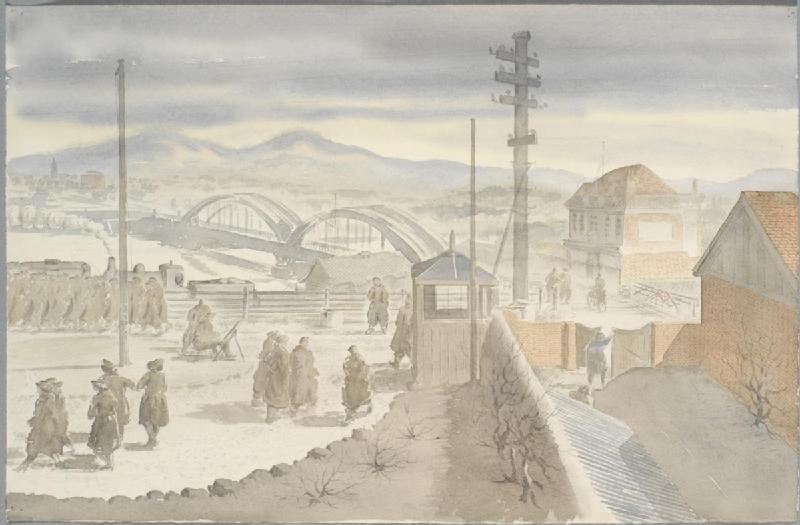
Recruits Training by James Kenward

Kenward was born in South London, the son of the Lloyd's insurance broker who invented rain insurance, The Jupiter Pluvius policy. Kenward received his prep school education at Ripple Vale School near Deal in Kent until entering Brighton College in 1919. On leaving Brighton he spent three years at Lloyd's in his father's footsteps before taking up writing full-time, at the age of twenty. His first novel for adults, John and David, a story of feuding brothers, was published by Peter Davies in 1931. This was followed by the fantasy Summervale in 1935, published by Constable and Co. and recounting the metamorphosis of an unassuming suburban insurance broker into a dog. The Manewood Line, a fictional account of the rise, decline and revival of Selsey's branch line and Kenward's last novel for adults (described as "A Romance" on the fly-leaves of later books), was published by Stanley Paul in 1937. Kenward's next book, The Roof-Tree, can be classed loosely as a work on architecture and was first published in 1938: it was reissued in The Oxford Bookshelf series in 1941. This was the first book that Kenward illustrated himself, apart from a few maps drawn for The Manewood Line.

At the age of 40, Kenward trained at the Ruskin School of Drawing and Fine Art in order to illustrate his own books. He was a skilled landscape draughtsman, making particularly fine drawings of trees, and many watercolour paintings.

Kenward held strong pacifist views, however he served as a gunner in the Second World War during which time he made many pen and wash drawings of army life. During the push of the Allied forces into Germany in 1944–45, he gave courses in Fine Art to fellow soldiers. Whilst representing the family during the terminal illness of one of his sisters in Lausanne in Switzerland, and whilst also attending local art classes, he met his future wife, Rubina Rose (née Grunig) in 1933. Marrying in 1938, they produced four children: in 1941, 1943, and twins in 1954.

Kenward's first publication after the War was Prince Foamytail (published by Comyns in 1946), a book for children developing material drawn from Summervale, and again self-illustrated. He followed this with the autobiographical The Suburban Child (1955), illustrated by Edward Ardizzone and published by Cambridge University Press. Its sequel, Prep School, was published by Michael Joseph in 1958 and illustrated by Christopher Brooker. Kenward's last two books, for children, were The Market Train Mystery and The Story of the Poor Author, both published by Nisbet in 1959 - and illustrated by Kenward himself. James Kenward died in 1994 (of cancer of the liver), leaving behind a substantial quantity of unpublished written material, plus many drawings and paintings.

== Kenward's Books ==
- John and David (London, Peter Davies, 1931);
- Summervale (London, Constable and Co., 1935);
- The Manewood Line (London, Stanley Paul, 1937);
- The Roof-Tree (Oxford, OUP, 1938 reprinted 1941);
- Prince Foamytail (London, Comyns, 1946);
- The Suburban Child (Cambridge, CUP, 1955);
- Prep School (London, Michael Joseph, 1958 and Penguin, 1961);
- The Market Train Mystery (Welwyn, Nisbet, 1959);
- The Story of the Poor Author (Welwyn, Nisbet, 1959)
- Faber Junior Dictionary (Faber, 1964)
