= The Otterbury Incident =

1948 novel by Cecil Day-Lewis

- First edition
- Author: Cecil Day-Lewis
- Illustrator: Edward Ardizzone
- Language: English
- Genre: Children's novel
- Publisher: Putnam & Company (UK); Viking Press (US)
- Publication date: 1948
- Publication place: United Kingdom
- Media type: Print (hardback)
- Pages: 148 pp

The Otterbury Incident is a novel for children by Cecil Day-Lewis first published in 1948 by G. P. Putnam's Sons in the UK and in the USA in 1949 by Viking Press. In both cases the illustrations were by Edward Ardizzone.

== Plot ==
Set in the immediate post-World War II period, the book is narrated in the first person and takes place in an English provincial town. The war has scarcely touched Otterbury, apart from one bomb which destroyed a few buildings near the centre, the site now known locally as "the incident" of the book's title. This is used for war-games by rival gangs from the local King's School. Ted's Company is led by 13-year-old Edward Marshall, whose second-in-command is George, the narrator, and also includes Nick Yates, Charlie Muswell and Young Wakeley. The 'enemy' is Toppy's Company, led by William Toppingham (also 13), and includes his lieutenant Peter Butts and the ghastly Prune.

Following a battle, in which Ted's Company is victorious, the boys are dribbling a football on the way back to school when Nick accidentally kicks it through a classroom window. After owning up, he is ordered by the headmaster to pay for the damage, but the cost amounts to an impossible sum for him. Compounding the problem, the orphaned Nick now lives with his aunt and uncle, who resent the unlooked-for responsibility and do not treat him well, and he cannot face confessing to them for fear of their reaction.

Ted arouses a sense of collective responsibility for Nick's plight amongst the boys of both companies, in the spirit of 'One for all and all for one' from The Three Musketeers, which their English teacher is currently reading to them. Resolving to raise the money between them, Ted and Toppy sign the “Peace of Otterbury”, temporarily ending hostilities between the gangs. They then launch Operation Glazier and over a bank holiday weekend they carry out a variety of money-making schemes. These include busking, shoe-shining, window-cleaning, an acrobat troupe, and lightning sketches by Toppy's nearly seventeen-years-old sister, (Miss E. Toppingham, R.A.)

Operation Glazier exceeds its target, but the money mysteriously disappears whilst in the charge of Ted and his grown-up sister, Rose, who looks after him. Toppy initially accuses Ted – who is ostracised by all but George and the ever-loyal Nick Yates – but then realises the real culprits are the deeply unpleasant local spiv, Johnny Sharp and his seedy accomplice, known as "The Wart". The boys turn detective to try to recover the money, stalking the Wart (who is much the weaker character of the two) and trying to extract a confession from him, but Johnny Sharp interrupts the proceedings, threatens the boys with a cut-throat razor, and locks them in the tower of the abbey church.

The boys escape and rethink their strategy to expose Sharp and the Wart; they have seen the men hanging out with a local merchant named Skinner and suspect that the missing money might be on Skinner's premises. Ted and Toppy use the combat-planning skills they have developed during their war-games to lead a raid on Skinner's warehouse, where they uncover evidence of far more extensive criminal activities, including trading in black-market goods and production of counterfeit coinage. The crooks return unexpectedly while Ted and Toppy are inside the warehouse. Toppy escapes but Ted is trapped and taken prisoner by Johnny Sharp.

The rest of the boys are still outside the yard, poised to attack with air guns. George is sent off to get the police while the others start a pitched battle to rescue Ted, in which The Wart and Skinner are overpowered and trussed up. Ted is saved thanks to Nick, who bravely attacks Sharp and is seriously injured in the process. Sharp escapes on foot, pursued by the boys, and his attempt to get away in a dinghy up the river is brought to a prompt end by Peter Butts, who launches a firework at the dinghy and capsizes it.

At the school assembly later, the boys are simultaneously castigated by Police Inspector Brook for their illegal raid on Skinner's premises and their "disreputable" money-raising schemes, but praised as heroes for their detective abilities. The headmaster now relents and says that the school will pay for the broken window (the missing money not having been recovered). In return, the boys promise not to take the law into their own hands again.

== Reception ==
On publication, the book was dedicated to Day-Lewis's two godsons, Jonathan Fenby and Richard Osborne. It was the second of his two children's books and adapted from the French screenplay of Nous les gosses (Us Kids) that was filmed in 1941. It has been described as "a minor children’s classic, remaining in print for nearly half a century". Japanese filmmaker Hayao Miyazaki included it in his list of 50 essential children's books.

The novel has been commended for its style, which is a parody of serious historical writing. One critic commented that "George [the narrator] very much styles himself the official war historian, writing up the history of 'The Otterbury Incident' in the high serious language of an epoch changing event. It is the delightful first person voice of George that gives the novel its humour and charm. Sometimes poor George – who is a just a little bit on the geeky side – takes his writing responsibilities more seriously than the combatants."
