= Eva-Lis Wuorio =

Finnish-Canadian children's writer

- Born: November 12, 1918
- Died: 1988 (aged 69–70); Ruovesi, Finland
- Occupation: Children's writer

Eva-Lis Wuorio (12 November 1918 – 1988 in Ruovesi) was a Finnish-born writer. She was born in Viipuri, Finland and her family emigrated to Canada, where she was educated. She later moved to the Channel Islands. She wrote principally for children and young adults.

== Bibliography ==
- Return of the Viking, Eau Claire, Wisconsin: E. M. Hale and Company, 1955
- The Canadian Twins (illustrated by Biro), Jonathan Cape, 1956
- The Island of Fish in the Trees (illustrated by Edward Ardizzone), Cleveland and New York: The World Publishing Company, 1962
- The Woman with the Portuguese Basket, New York: Holt, Rinehart and Winston, 1963
- The Land of Right Up and Down (illustrated by Edward Ardizzone), Cleveland and New York: The World Publishing Company, 1964
- The Terror Factor, New York: Lancer Books, 1965
- Tal and the Magic Barruget (illustrated by Bettina), Cleveland and New York: The World Publishing Company, 1965
- Z for Zaborra, New York: Holt, Rinehart and Winston, 1965
- October Treasure, New York: Holt, Rinehart and Winston, 1966
- Midsummer Lokki, New York: Holt, Rinehart and Winston, 1966 (also published as Explosion!)
- Venture at Midsummer, New York: Holt, Rinehart and Winston, 1967
- Forbidden Adventure, London: Ronald Whiting & Wheaton, 1967
- Kali and the Golden Mirror (illustrated by Edward Ardizzone), Cleveland and New York: The World Publishing Company, 1967
- Save Alice!, New York: Holt, Rinehart and Winston, 1968
- The Happiness Flower, (illustrated by Don Bolognese), Cleveland and New York: The World Publishing Company, 1969
- The Singing Canoe (illustrated by Irving Boker), Cleveland and New York: The World Publishing Company, 1969
- Code: Polonaise, New York: Holt, Rinehart and Winston, 1971
- To Fight in Silence, New York: Holt, Rinehart and Winston, 1973
- Escape If You Can: 13 Tales of the Preternatural, The Viking Press, 1977
- Detour to Danger New York: Delacorte Press, 1981
