= Stig of the Dump =

1963 children's novel by Clive King

- First edition
- Author: Clive King
- Illustrator: Edward Ardizzone
- Language: English
- Genre: Fantasy adventure
- Publisher: Puffin Books
- Publication date: 1 June 1963
- Publication place: United Kingdom
- Media type: Print (paperback); Audiobook (read by Martin Jarvis); Audiobook (read by Tony Robinson)
- Pages: 157 pp
- ISBN: 978-0-14-034724-1

Stig of the Dump is a children's novel by Clive King which was first published in the United Kingdom in 1963. It is regarded as a modern children's classic and is often read in schools. It was illustrated by Edward Ardizzone and has been adapted twice for television, in 1981 and in 2002. It was featured in a broadcast as an adaptation on BBC Home Service for schools in November 1964, and later on the BBC series Blue Peter.

== Plot ==
Barney is a bored young boy staying with his grandparents on the chalk Downs of southern England. One day, he falls over the edge of an old chalk pit close to his grandparents' house, tumbling through the roof of a den. While exploring the den, Barney encounters its owner, Stig, a caveman with shaggy, black hair and bright black eyes. The chalk pit is disused and full of people's dumped rubbish.

Barney and Stig quickly become friends. They learn to communicate with each other without language, as Stig speaks no English. Stig's den is a place built out of discarded rubbish, which motivates Barney to help Stig make it look more attractive. They spend time repairing and improving Stig's den, collecting firewood, going hunting, and at one point catching some burglars who break into Barney's grandparents' house. On another occasion Barney is cornered by the bullying Snarget brothers, who become uncharacteristically docile when Stig appears and are impressed by Barney's friendship with Stig. Although Barney mentions Stig to others, no-one (with the exception of the Snargets) believes that Stig is real.

Barney starts to give thought to where Stig has come from. During a very hot, sultry mid-summer's night, when Barney and his sister Lou are unable to sleep, they find themselves transported back in time and out onto the Downs. To their surprise, they meet Stig, back with his own people, engaged in the construction of four gigantic standing stones. They spend a night camping out with the people of Stig's tribe, and helping to shift the final stone into position before sunrise. As dawn breaks, the tribe disappear and the stones suddenly become ancient and weathered; but Stig is still there. Stig got transported forward in time with the standing stone which led him to the modern day.

Barney and Lou do not share their adventures with anyone, and their parents never realise the truth of Stig's existence, although they jokingly talk about him as a kind of magical being that can fix particularly "odd jobs". It is left unclear whether Barney sees much more of Stig, or even whether Stig stays in the rapidly-filling rubbish dump. A figure that resembles Stig is sighted working with junk in various locations around the area; but the book concludes that "perhaps it was only a relative of his", suggesting that Stig may not be the only caveman alive in the modern world.

== Adaptations ==
Stig of the Dump was adapted for television, firstly by Thames Television for ITV in 1981 and later by the BBC in 2002 starring Thomas Sangster, Robert Tannion, Nick Ryan, Geoffrey Palmer, Phyllida Law, Perdita Weeks, and Michaela Dicker. The BBC series won the BAFTA Children's Film & Television Award and its writer, Peter Tabern, received the Best Children's Writer award. The series has been released on DVD.

The book has also been adapted for the theatre, to critical acclaim. Topologika Software Ltd has published an adventure game for Microsoft Windows based on the first three chapters of the book.
