= The Little Bookroom =

1955 children's book by Eleanor Farjeon

- First edition
- Author: Eleanor Farjeon
- Illustrator: Edward Ardizzone
- Cover artist: Ardizzone
- Language: English
- Genre: Children's short stories, original fairy tales
- Publisher: OUP
- Publication date: 1955
- Publication place: United Kingdom
- Media type: Print (hardcover, paperback)
- Pages: 302 pp (first edition)
- ISBN: 0-19-271947-5 (2004)
- OCLC: 632408232
- LC Class: PZ7.F229

The Little Bookroom is a collection of twenty-seven stories for children by Eleanor Farjeon, published by Oxford University Press in 1955 with illustrations by Edward Ardizzone. They were selected by the author from stories published earlier in her career. Most were in the fairy tale style.

Next year Farjeon won the inaugural Hans Christian Andersen International Medal, recognising her career contribution to children's literature as a writer. She also won the annual Carnegie Medal, recognising The Little Bookroom as the year's best children's book by a British subject.

Oxford published a U.S. edition in 1956 with a long title, as catalogued by the national library: The Little Bookroom: Eleanor Farjeon's short stories for children, chosen by herself.

== The title ==
One room in the house of her childhood was called "the little bookroom", Farjeon explains in the Author's Note. Although there were many books all over the house, this dusty room was like an untended garden, full to the ceiling of stray, left-over books, opening "magic casements" on to other times and places for the young Eleanor, filling her mind with a silver-cobwebby mixture of fact, fancy and romance which influenced all her later writing. "Seven maids with seven brooms, sweeping for half-a-hundred years, have never managed to clear my mind of its dust of vanished temples and flowers and kings, the curls of ladies, the sighing of poets, the laughter of lads and girls."

== The stories ==
The four longest of 27 stories (‡) constitute one-third of the collection by length.

- The King and the Corn
- The King's Daughter Cries for the Moon ‡
- Young Kate
- The Flower Without a Name
- The Goldfish
- The Clumber Pup ‡
- The Miracle of the Poor Island
- The Girl Who Kissed the Peach-Tree
- Westwoods
- The Barrel-Organ
- The Giant and the Mite
- The Little Dressmaker
- The Lady's Room
- The Seventh Princess
- Leaving Paradise ‡
- The Little Lady's Roses
- In Those Days
- The Connemara Donkey
- The Tims
- Pennyworth
- And I Dance Mine Own Child ‡
- The Lovebirds
- San Fairy Ann
- The Glass Peacock
- The Kind Farmer
- Old Surly and the Boy
- Pannychis

== The illustrations ==
The black-and-white illustrations by Edward Ardizzone have been described as evoking "the magical atmosphere of the stories". Although the librarians judged no 1955 book suitable for the newly established Kate Greenaway Medal for children's book illustration, a year later Ardizzone won the first-awarded Greenaway Medal for Tim All Alone (1956) which he also wrote.

== Literary significance and reception ==
In England the best work of the years after the First World War was mainly in poetry, or fantasy, or poetic fantasy; in particular there was a spate of original stories in the folk-tale manner. Eleanor Farjeon was above all a poet, but from the 1920s onward she effectively used poetic language and fancy in creating literary but homely fairy tales for children, as did her fellow poet, Walter de la Mare. The "literary fairy tale" recreates traditional fairy tales and folktales in several respects, such as clear distinctions between good and evil, and their inevitable reward and punishment. Writing in this genre, Farjeon was one of the foremost 20th century followers of Hans Christian Andersen, which makes it fitting that she was the first recipient of the Hans Christian Andersen Award in 1956. Although the award recognises an author's or illustrator's whole body of work, the publication of The Little Bookroom provided an impetus for the award. Similarly, the 1955 Carnegie Medal was considered a recognition of Eleanor Farjeon's contribution to children's literature as a whole, echoing the 1947 award to Walter de la Mare for Collected Stories for Children.

== Melbourne bookshop ==
In 1960, Albert Ullin opened a specialty children's bookshop in Melbourne, Australia named The Little Bookroom as a tribute to Farjeon's book. Ullin received Farjeon's permission to use the name, as well as from Ardizzone to use one of the book's illustrations as the logo. The shop moved premises several times over the following decades, and at various stages operated multiple locations. Ullin died in 2018, having become a highly influential person in the field of Australian children's literature. Today, The Little Bookroom is still in operation and is considered the oldest children's bookshop in the world.

== Publication history ==
Puffin Books (1977) retained the original cover and interior illustrations by Edward Ardizzone (see image).

New York Review Books published an edition in 2003 with afterword by Rumer Godden (ISBN 1590170482), retaining the original illustrations.

The 2004 Oxford edition used a new cover illustration.

== See also ==
Awards
| Preceded by Knight Crusader | Carnegie Medal recipient 1955 | Succeeded by The Last Battle |
