= H. J. Kaeser =

German Jewish writer

H. J. Kaeser (Hildegard Johanna Kaeser) (April 4, 1904 – March 26, 1965) was a German Jewish writer, many of whose books have been translated into English and published by OUP. She is perhaps best known for her series of charming children's books about Mimff, all of which were illustrated by Edward Ardizzone. The Mimff translators included David Ascoli and Kathleen Williamson.

== Personal life ==
Kaeser had a birth defect that impaired her walking, and as a child became an avid reader. Educated in Berlin, she worked at a publishing company after leaving school, and in 1925 became editor of a children's magazine. She married Walter Kaeser in 1930. On Hitler's access to power in 1933, she and her husband left Germany, first for France, then to Denmark in 1934, and finally in 1935 to Sweden. She wrote journal articles (in Swedish) under the pseudonym Hillevi Hill. She became a Swedish citizen in 1946, and chose not to return to Germany. In 1965, shortly after her husband's death, she herself died from an overdose of sleeping pills.

== Publications ==
The Mimff books are aimed at readers from 9–12 years, and the series comprised:

- Mimff - 1939 - Mimff: the boy who was not afraid
- Mimff in Charge - 1949 - where Mimff's parents adopt a little girl
- Mimff Takes Over - 1954 - where Mimff's father brings home a young Hungarian refugee
- Mimff-Robinson - 1958 - where Mimff's ambition is to live on an island like Robinsoe Crusoe

H.J. Kaeser's other works include:

- Tag ohne Traum - 1959 (A day without a dream)
- Mathias Langeland - 1948
- Gutten Some Ingen Kunne Lur – 1950 - with Lise Deshcher (illustrator) (The Boy No One Could Catch)
- Das Karussell - 1942 (The Carousel)
- Junker und Gefährte. Die Geschichte einer Freundschaft - 1942 (Junker & Companion. The story of a friendship)
- Femman gör slag i saken (Femman goes to battle)

A Jewish feminist, Kaeser also wrote biographies, primarily of significant women in history, including:

- Helen Keller
- Harriet Beecher Stowe
- Mathilda Wrede
- Florence Nightingale
- Clara Schumann
- Amalie Dietrich
- Amelia Earhart
- Heinrich Schliemann
- Johann Heinrich Pestalozzi
- Louis Favre

Many of her books were published in Swedish, Danish, Finnish and Norwegian (as well as German and English).
