= Maurice Gorham =

Irish journalist and broadcasting executive (1902–1975)

- Born: Maurice Anthony Coneys Gorham; 1902
- Died: 9 August 1975 (aged 72–73); Dublin, Ireland
- Citizenship: Irish
- Education: Stonyhurst College; Balliol College, Oxford
- Title: Controller of BBC Television Service (1946-1947)

Maurice Anthony Coneys Gorham (1902 – 9 August 1975) was an Irish journalist and broadcasting executive. After being educated in England at Stonyhurst College, Lancashire and later Balliol College, Oxford, he began working as a journalist on the London local newspaper Westminster Guardian and Weekly Westminster after he graduated in 1923.

== Career ==
Gorham's father was a doctor from Clifden and his mother came from Lancashire. He was educated at Stonyhurst College and Balliol College, Oxford. Gorham began his career in journalism with the Westminster Guardian and Weekly Westminste newspapers. He worked in the London newspaper industry for three years, before in 1926 joining the staff of the BBC's own listings magazine, the Radio Times. In 1928 he was promoted to become the magazine's Art Editor, and then in 1933 became its general Editor, a post he was to occupy for eight years until 1941.

In that year, he made the switch from broadcasting journalism to working in broadcasting proper when he was appointed as the Director of the BBC's North American Services. He returned to Europe in 1944 to serve as Director of the BBC Allied Expeditionary Forces Programme - a radio service specially designed for the allied troops invading Europe after D-Day. In that capacity, he worked closely with Major Glenn Miller and his Army Air Force Band.

After the end of the war in 1945, he was appointed as the Director of the new BBC Light Programme that July; this appointment was only a brief one, however, for in the following year he was made the first post-war Director of the re-launched BBC Television Service, responsible for getting the young service back up and running after a seven-year break. However, disagreements with his superiors meant that this was also a brief appointment, and he resigned from the staff of the BBC after twenty-one years in December 1947, returning to journalism.

He went back home to Ireland, and in 1953 returned to broadcasting as the Director of Radio Éireann. In September 1959 he left this position - his reasons for resigning were not disclosed, but it is widely believed that he disagreed strongly with the Government's plans for how to introduce a television service to the country, which was due to happen the following year.

In his retirement he wrote a number of books on broadcasting, pubs and Ireland and Irish life. He died in Dublin on 9 August 1975. Gorham never married.

== Publications ==
- Sound and Fury: Twenty-one Years in the B.B.C. (1948)
- Londoners (1951)
- Showmen and Suckers: An Excursion on the Crazy Fringe of the Entertainment World (1951)
- Forty Years of Irish Broadcasting (1967)
- Dublin From Old Photographs (1972)
- The Local (with Edward Ardizzone) (1939)

Media offices
Preceded by Gerald Cock	Controller of BBC Television Service; 1946-1947	Succeeded by Norman Collins
