= Meriol Trevor =

British writer (1919–2000)

- Born: 15 April 1919
- Died: 12 January 2000 (aged 80)
- Occupation: Writer
- Writing career
- Period: 1949–2001
- Genres: Biography, children's literature
- Notable works: Newman: The Pillar of Cloud, Newman: Light in Winter

Meriol Trevor (15 April 1919 – 12 January 2000) was a British Roman Catholic writer of children's books, historical novels and biographies. Her two-volume biography of Cardinal Newman won the James Tait Black Memorial Prize in 1963.

== Biography ==
Meriol Trevor was born in London and grew up in Kent and Cambridge. She was educated at Perse Girls' School, Cambridge and St Hugh's College, Oxford, where she studied classics and philosophy. After graduating from Oxford in 1942, she took several temporary jobs before going to Italy after the war to help with reconstruction. After encountering Catholic culture in Italy, she became a Roman Catholic in 1950.

Her children's books strongly reflect her Catholic faith, presenting themes of conflict and redemption often in mythic form. A number of her historical novels are set in Romano-Britain and early Christian Europe. Her two-volume biography of Cardinal Newman, Newman: The Pillar of Cloud and Newman: Light in Winter, published in 1962, received the James Tait Black Memorial Prize for biography.

From the 1960s, Trevor lived in Bath, Somerset. In 1967 she was elected a Fellow of the Royal Society of Literature.

== Bibliography ==
=== Novels ===
- The Last of Britain (1956)
- The New People (1957)
- A Narrow Place (1958)
- Shadows and Images (1960)
- The City and the World (1970)
- The Holy Images (1971)
- The Two Kingdoms (1973)
- The Fugitives (1973) (Luxembourg series 1)
- The Marked Man (1974) (Luxembourg series 2)
- The Enemy at Home (1974) (Luxembourg series 3)
- The Forgotten Country (1975) (Luxembourg series 4)
- The Treacherous Paths (1976) (Luxembourg series 5)
- The Fortunate Marriage (1976) (Warstowe Series 1)
- The Civil Prisoners (1977) (Warstowe Series 2)
- The Fortunes of Peace (1978) (Luxembourg series 6)
- The Wanton Fires(1979) (Warstowe Series 3)
- The Sun with a Face (1982) (Warstowe Series 4)
- The Golden Palaces (1986)

=== Books for children ===
- The Forest and the Kingdom (1949) (World Dionysius Novels 1)
- Hunt the King, Hide the Fox (1950) (World Dionysius Novels 2)
- The Fires and the Stars (1951) (World Dionysius Novels 3)
- Sun Slower, Sun Faster (1955)
- The Treasure Hunt (1957)
- Merlin's Ring (1957)
- The Other Side of the Moon (1957)
- The Caravan War (1958)
- The Sparrow Child (1958)
- Four Odd Ones (1958)
- William's Wild Day Out (1963)
- The Rose Round (1963)
- The Midsummer Maze (1964)
- Lights in a Dark Town (1964)
- The King of the Castle (1966)
- The Crystal Snowstorm (1997) (Letzenstein Chronicles Book 1)
- Following the Phoenix (1998) (Letzenstein Chronicles Book 2)
- Angel and Dragon (1999) (Letzenstein Chronicles Book 3)
- The Rose and Crown (1999) (Letzenstein Chronicles Book 4)

=== Poetry ===
- Midsummer, Midwinter and Other Poems (1957)

=== Nonfiction ===
- Newman: The Pillar of the Cloud (1962)
- Newman: Light in Winter (1962)
- Newman Today (1963) (23-page Catholic Truth Society pamphlet)
- Newman: A Portrait Restored. An Ecumenical Revaluation (with John Coulson and A.M. Allchin) (1965)
- Apostle of Rome: A Life of St Philip Neri, 1515-1595 (1966)
- Pope John (1967); new edition Pope John: Blessed John XXIII (2000)
- Prophets and Guardians: Renewal and Tradition in the Church (1969)
- The Arnolds: Thomas Arnold and His Family (1973)
- Newman's Journey (1974)
- The Shadow of a Crown: The Life Story of James II of England and VII of Scotland (1988)
- John Henry Newman: Apostle to the Doubtful (with Leonie Caldecott) (2001)
