= 1955 in literature =

This article contains information about the literary events and publications of 1955.

== Events ==
- February 8 – Jin Yong's first wuxia novel, The Book and the Sword (書劍恩仇錄), begins publication in the New Evening Post (Hong Kong), where he is an editor.
- March 3 – Jean Cocteau is elected to the Académie française (inducted October 20); on January 8 he has been elected to the Académie royale des Sciences, des Lettres et des Beaux-Arts de Belgique (inducted October 1).
- April 16 – Sir Laurence Olivier's film version of Shakespeare's Richard III is released in the cinemas of the United Kingdom.
- June – J. P. Donleavy's novel The Ginger Man is published in Paris by Olympia Press, but he is angered when he finds they have produced it under their imprint for pornography, 'The Traveller's Companion Series'. It is prohibited in both the author's adoptive and native countries, the Republic of Ireland and the United States, for obscenity. Set in postwar Dublin it features the character Sebastian Dangerfield.
- July 10 – Jorge Luis Borges is appointed Director of the National Library of the Argentine Republic.
- July 14 – Director Stephen Joseph sets up Britain's first theatre in the round at Scarborough, North Yorkshire, predecessor of the Stephen Joseph Theatre.
- July 30 – The English poet Philip Larkin, having become University Librarian at the University of Hull on March 21, is inspired on a train from Hull to Grantham to write a poem, "The Whitsun Weddings". His collection The Less Deceived is published in November (dated October).
- August
  - The American speculative fiction author Charles Beaumont's short story "The Crooked Man", depicting a homosexual society where heterosexuality is persecuted, is published in Playboy magazine after being rejected by Esquire.
  - An article in the British Journal of Education criticises Enid Blyton's novels as formulaic.
- August 3 – The English-language première of Samuel Beckett's play Waiting for Godot, directed by Peter Hall, opens at the Arts Theatre, London. The initial reaction is hostile, but "[e]verything changed on Sunday 7 August 1955 with Kenneth Tynan's and Harold Hobson's reviews in The Observer and The Sunday Times. Beckett was always grateful to the two reviewers for their support ... which more or less transformed the play overnight into the rage of London."
- August 27 – The first hardback edition of The Guinness Book of Records appears in London.
- September – Vladimir Nabokov's Lolita appears in Paris three years before its US publication.
- September 26 – The Madan Puraskar is established as an annual award for outstanding books in the Nepali language, endowed by Rani Jagadamba Kumari Devi (first awards 1956).
- November – Frank Herbert's first novel The Dragon in the Sea begins as a three-part serial, Under Pressure, in the monthly Astounding Science-Fiction.
- November 28 – Ray Lawler's Summer of the Seventeenth Doll is first staged by the Union Theatre Repertory Company in Melbourne with the playwright in a lead. It is the first authentically naturalistic drama in the theatre of Australia.
- unknown date
  - Violette Leduc's novel Ravages is issued in France but the publisher, Éditions Gallimard, suppresses the opening section depicting a semi-autobiographical lesbian awakening, which will be published as a novella, Thérèse et Isabelle, in 1966.
  - The Indian guru Mani Madhava Chakyar performs Koodiyattam outside a temple for the first time.

== New books ==
=== Fiction ===
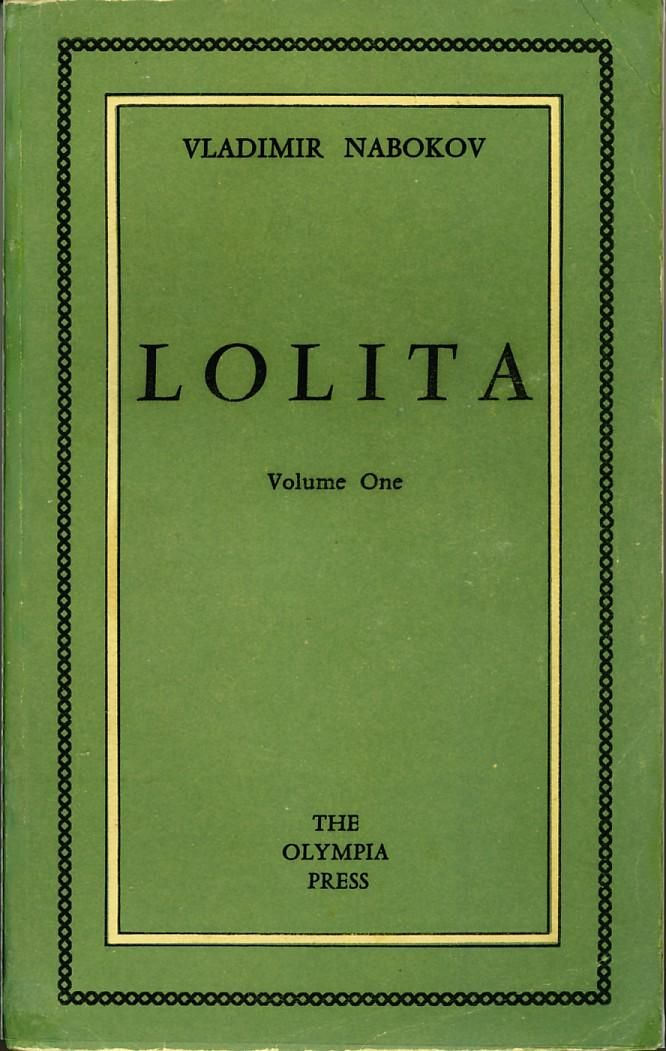
1st ed.

- Kingsley Amis – That Uncertain Feeling
- Isaac Asimov
  - The End of Eternity
  - The Martian Way and Other Stories
- Elisabeth Augustin – Labyrinth (Auswege)
- Nigel Balchin – The Fall of the Sparrow
- Margot Bennett – The Man Who Didn't Fly
- John Bingham – The Paton Street Case
- Antoine Blondin – L'Humeur vagabonde
- Leigh Brackett – The Long Tomorrow
- Ray Bradbury – The October Country
- Christianna Brand – Tour de Force
- Victor Canning – His Bones are Coral
- Henry Cecil – Brothers in Law
- Louis-Ferdinand Céline – Conversations with Professor Y (Entretiens avec le professeur Y)
- Agatha Christie – Hickory Dickory Dock
- Arthur C. Clarke – Earthlight
- Ivy Compton-Burnett – Mother and Son
- Thomas B. Costain – The Tontine
- Marco Denevi – Rosaura a las 10 (Rosaura at 10 O'Clock)
- Patrick Dennis – Auntie Mame
- John Dickson Carr – Captain Cut-Throat
- J. P. Donleavy – The Ginger Man
- Friedrich Dürrenmatt – Once a Greek (Grieche sucht Griechin)
- Mircea Eliade – The Forbidden Forest (Noaptea de Sânziene)
- Ian Fleming – Moonraker
- André Franquin – La Corne de rhinocéros
- Gillian Freeman – The Liberty Man
- William Gaddis – The Recognitions
- Gao Yubao (with Guo Yongjiang) – Gao Yubao
- David Garnett – Aspects of Love
- William Golding – The Inheritors
- Richard Gordon – Doctor at Large
- Graham Greene
  - The Quiet American
  - Loser Takes All
- L.P. Hartley – A Perfect Woman
- Robert A. Heinlein – Tunnel in the Sky
- Georgette Heyer – Bath Tangle
- Patricia Highsmith – The Talented Mr. Ripley
- Robert E. Howard and L. Sprague de Camp – Tales of Conan
- Aldous Huxley – The Genius and the Goddess
- Mac Hyman – No Time for Sergeants
- Roger Ikor – Les Eaux mêlées
- Michael Innes – The Man from the Sea
- Robin Jenkins – The Cone Gatherers
- Ruth Prawer Jhabvala – To Whom She Will
- MacKinlay Kantor – Andersonville
- Nikos Kazantzakis – The Last Temptation of Christ (O Teleutaios Peirasmos)
- Yaşar Kemal – Memed, My Hawk (İnce Memed)
- Margaret Kennedy – The Oracles
- Alexander Lernet-Holenia – Count Luna
- E. C. R. Lorac – Ask a Policeman
- Józef Mackiewicz
  - Droga donikąd (The Road to Nowhere)
  - Karierowicz
- Alistair MacLean – HMS Ulysses
- Norman Mailer – The Deer Park
- Gabriel García Márquez
  - The Story of a Shipwrecked Sailor (Relato de un náufrago)
  - Leaf Storm (La Hojarasca)
- Ngaio Marsh – Scales of Justice
- J. J. Marric – Gideon's Day
- Gladys Mitchell – Watson's Choice
- Brian Moore – Judith Hearne
- Vladimir Nabokov – Lolita
- Flannery O'Connor – A Good Man Is Hard to Find and Other Stories (including "A Good Man Is Hard to Find" and "Good Country People")
- John O'Hara – Ten North Frederick
- Pier Paolo Pasolini – Ragazzi di vita
- Anthony Powell – The Acceptance World
- Marin Preda – Moromeții, Vol. 1
- Barbara Pym – Less than Angels
- Alain Robbe-Grillet – Le Voyeur
- Juan Rulfo – Pedro Páramo
- Rafael Sánchez Ferlosio – El Jarama
- Isaac Bashevis Singer – Satan in Goray
- Howard Spring – These Lovers Fled Away
- Mary Stewart – Madam, Will You Talk?
- Rex Stout – Before Midnight
- Jim Thompson – After Dark, My Sweet
- Morton Thompson – Not as a Stranger
- J. R. R. Tolkien – The Lord of the Rings: The Return of the King
- Henry Wade – A Dying Fall
- Alec Waugh – Island in the Sun
- Evelyn Waugh – Officers and Gentlemen
- Anthony West – Heritage
- Patrick White – The Tree of Man
- Leonard Wibberley – The Mouse That Roared
- Sloan Wilson – The Man in the Gray Flannel Suit
- Herman Wouk – Marjorie Morningstar
- John Wyndham – The Chrysalids
- Frank Yerby – The Treasure of Pleasant Valley

=== Children and young people ===
- Rev. W. Awdry – Four Little Engines (tenth in The Railway Series of 42 books by him and his son Christopher Awdry)
- BB (Denys Watkins-Pitchford) – The Forest of Boland Light Railway
- Paul Berna – Le Cheval sans tête (Horse without a Head, translated as A Hundred Million Francs)
- Dick Bruna – Miffy (Nijntje)
- Crockett Johnson – Harold and the Purple Crayon
- C. S. Lewis – The Magician's Nephew
- William Mayne – A Swarm in May
- Janet McNeill – My Friend Specs McCann
- Iona and Peter Opie – The Oxford Nursery Rhyme Book
- Philippa Pearce – Minnow on the Say
- Marjorie Kinnan Rawlings (died 1953) – The Secret River
- Barbara Sleigh – Carbonel: The King of the Cats

=== Drama ===
- Enid Bagnold – The Chalk Garden
- Samuel Beckett – Waiting for Godot (English version)
- Bertolt Brecht – Trumpets and Drums (Pauken und Trompeten; adaptation of Farquhar's The Recruiting Officer, 1706)
- João Cabral de Melo Neto – Morte e Vida Severina (Severine Life and Death, verse)
- John Dighton – Man Alive!
- Sonnie Hale – The French Mistress
- William Inge – Bus Stop
- Eugène Ionesco
  - Jack, or The Submission (Jacques ou la soumission)
  - The New Tenant (Le Nouveau locataire)
- Ray Lawler – Summer of the Seventeenth Doll
- Jerome Lawrence and Robert Edwin Lee – Inherit the Wind
- Philip Mackie – The Whole Truth
- Arthur Miller
  - A View from the Bridge (one-act verse version)
  - A Memory of Two Mondays
- J. B. Priestley – Mr. Kettle and Mrs. Moon
- Reginald Rose – Twelve Angry Men (stage version)
- Jean-Paul Sartre – Nekrassov
- Ariano Suassuna – O Auto da Compadecida (The Compassionate Self)
- Orson Welles – Moby Dick—Rehearsed
- Thornton Wilder
  - The Matchmaker
  - A Life in the Sun
- Tennessee Williams – Cat on a Hot Tin Roof
- Carl Zuckmayer – The Cold Light (Das kalte Licht)

=== Musical theater ===
- Cole Porter's musical Silk Stockings opens at Imperial Theatre New York City for 461 performances

=== Poetry ===
- Emily Dickinson (died 1886), edited by Thomas H. Johnson – The Poems of Emily Dickinson
- Philip Larkin – The Less Deceived
- R.S. Thomas – Song at the Year's Turning

=== Non-fiction ===
- Richard Aldington – Lawrence of Arabia: A Biographical Inquiry
- James Baldwin – Notes of a Native Son
- Frank Barlow – The Feudal Kingdom of England
- Ivan Bunin (died 1953) – About Chekhov
- G. D. H. Cole – Studies in Class Structure
- Thomas E. Gaddis – Birdman of Alcatraz
- Antonio Gramsci – Gli intellettuali e l'organizzazione della cultura (Intellectuals and Cultural Organization)
- Robert Graves – The Greek Myths
- The Guinness Book of Records, 1st edition
- Langston Hughes – The Sweet Flypaper of Life
- Morris K. Jessup – The Case for the UFO
- R. K. Kelsall – Higher Civil Servants in Britain
- T. E. Lawrence (352087 A/c Ross; died 1935) – The Mint: A day-book of the R.A.F. Depot between August and December 1922, with later notes (written 1928; 1st trade edition)
- C. S. Lewis – Surprised by Joy
- Walter Lippmann – Essays in the Public Philosophy
- Walter Lord – A Night to Remember
- Herbert Marcuse – Eros and Civilization
- Alan Marshall – I Can Jump Puddles
- Garrett Mattingly – Renaissance Diplomacy
- Meher Baba – God Speaks
- J. H. Plumb – Studies in Social History
- RAND – A Million Random Digits with 100,000 Normal Deviates
- Donald J. West – Homosexuality

== Births ==
- January 11 – Max Lucado, American religious writer
- January 12 – Rockne S. O'Bannon, American writer and producer
- January 13 – Jay McInerney, American novelist
- January 27 – Alexander Stuart, English-born American novelist and screenwriter
- February 2 – Leszek Engelking, Polish poet, fiction writer and translator
- February 8 – John Grisham, American novelist
- February 17 – Mo Yan, Chinese fiction writer
- February 23 – Francesca Simon, American-born children's fiction writer
- March 11 – D. J. MacHale, American writer
- March 19 – John Burnside, Scottish poet and fiction writer
- March 23 – Lloyd Jones, New Zealand novelist
- March 27 – Patrick McCabe, Irish novelist
- April 8 – Barbara Kingsolver, American novelist, essayist and poet
- April 30 – Zlatko Topčić, Bosnian author and screenwriter
- May 13 – Mark Abley, Canadian poet and non-fiction writer
- May 30 – Colm Tóibín, Irish novelist, playwright and poet
- June 4 – Val McDermid, Scottish crime novelist
- June 16 – J. Jill Robinson, Canadian fiction writer
- June 20 – Tor Nørretranders, Danish science author
- July 1
  - Candia McWilliam, Scottish fiction writer
  - Lisa Scottoline, American writer of legal thrillers
- July 5
  - Sebastian Barry, Irish novelist, playwright and poet
  - Mia Couto (António Emílio Leite Couto), Mozambican fiction writer and poet
- July 6
  - Michael Boyd, British theatre director
  - William Wall, Irish author and poet
- July 7 – Suzanne Weyn, American children's and young-adult writer
- July 10 – Regina Yaou, Ivory Coast novelist (died 2017)
- July 12 – Robin Robertson, Scottish-born poet, novelist and editor
- July 24 – Brad Watson, American author and academic (died 2020)
- August 2 – Caleb Carr, American writer
- August 7 – Vladimir Sorokin, Russian writer
- August 8 – Iain Pears, English writer
- August 14 - Mary E. Pearson, American young-adult fiction writer
- September 6 – Raymond Benson, American novelist
- September 13 – Hiromi Itō (伊藤 比呂美), Japanese poet, essayist and translator
- October 19 – Jason Shinder, American poet and editor (died 2008)
- November 6 – Catherine Asaro, American science fiction and fantasy author
- November 12 – Katharine Weber, American author and academic
- November 23 – Steven Brust, American fantasy author
- December 28 – Liu Xiaobo (刘晓波), Chinese critic, writer and activist (died 2017)
- unknown date – Wang Xiaoni (王小妮), Chinese poet

== Deaths ==
- January 18 – Saadat Hasan Manto, Pakistani fiction writer (born 1912; cirrhosis)
- January 20 – Robert P. Tristram Coffin, American poet, essayist and novelist (born 1892)
- February 23 – Paul Claudel, French poet, dramatist and diplomat (born 1868)
- April 10 – Pierre Teilhard de Chardin, French philosopher and essayist (born 1881)
- May 16 – James Agee, American writer (born 1909; heart attack)
- June 6 – Joseph Jefferson Farjeon, English crime writer (born 1883)
- June 17 – Constance Holme, English novelist and dramatist (born 1880)
- June 19 – Adrienne Monnier, French poet and publisher (born 1892; suicide)
- June 21 – Roger Mais, Jamaican novelist (born 1905)
- June 30 – Gilbert Cannan, British writer (born 1884)
- July 3 – Beatrice Chase, English writer (born 1874)
- August 1 – Charles Shaw, Australian writer (born 1900)
- August 2 – Wallace Stevens, American poet (born 1879)
- August 12 – Thomas Mann, German novelist (born 1875)
- August 14 – Herbert Putnam, American Librarian of Congress (born 1861)
- August 29 – Hong Shen (洪深), Chinese dramatist (born 1894)
- September 7 – Mary Tracy Earle , American author and essayist (born 1864)
- September 20 – Robert Riskin, American dramatist and screenwriter (born 1897)
- October 18 – José Ortega y Gasset, Spanish philosopher (born 1883)
- November 1 – Dale Carnegie, American writer (born 1888)
- November 12 – Tin Ujević, Croatian poet (born 1891)
- November 14
  - Ruby M. Ayres, English romance novelist (born 1881)
  - Robert E. Sherwood, American playwright (born 1896)
- December – Al. T. Stamatiad, Romanian poet (born 1885)

== Awards ==
- Carnegie Medal for children's literature: Eleanor Farjeon, The Little Bookroom
- Friedenspreis des Deutschen Buchhandels: Hermann Hesse
- Frost Medal: Leona Speyer
- James Tait Black Memorial Prize for fiction: Ivy Compton-Burnett, Mother and Son
- James Tait Black Memorial Prize for biography: R. W. Ketton-Cremer, Thomas Gray
- Newbery Medal for children's literature: Meindert DeJong, The Wheel on the School
- Nobel Prize for Literature: Halldór Laxness
- Premio Nadal: Rafael Sánchez Ferlosio, El Jarama
- Prix Goncourt: Roger Ikor, Les eaux mêlées
- Pulitzer Prize for Drama: Tennessee Williams, Cat on a Hot Tin Roof
- Pulitzer Prize for Fiction: William Faulkner, A Fable
- Pulitzer Prize for Poetry: Wallace Stevens, Collected Poems
- Queen's Gold Medal for Poetry: Ruth Pitter
