= Ostrong =

Austrian mountain range

Coordinates: 48°16′46″N 15°6′16″E

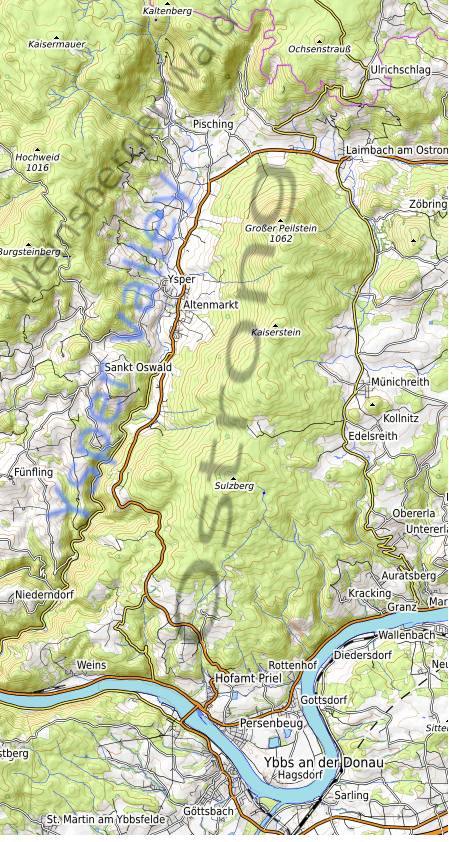
The Ostrong range north of the Danube at Ybbs

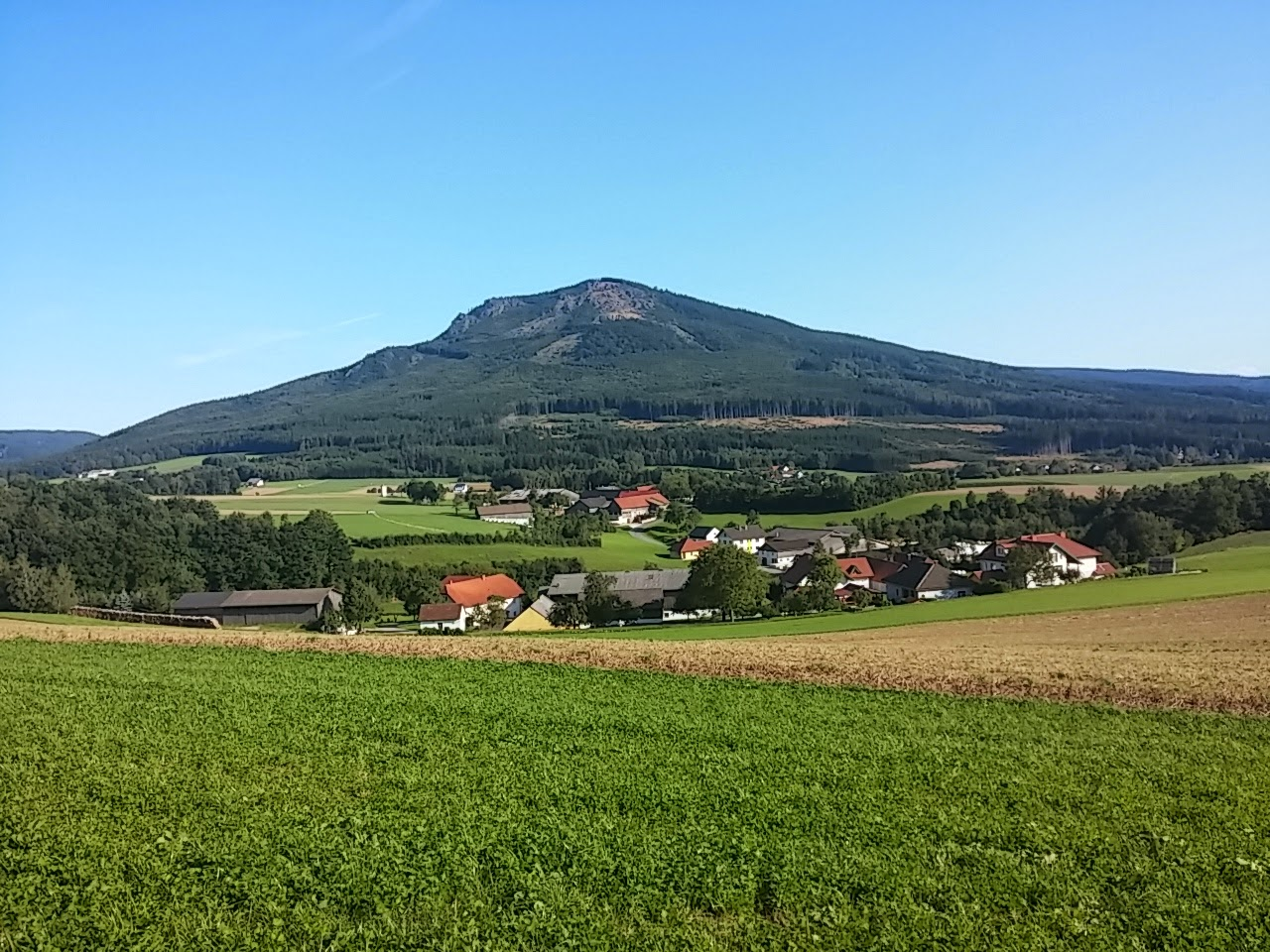
Großer Peilstein

The Ostrong (German pronunciation: [ˈɔstʁɔŋ]) is a small 13 km long mountain range in the Waldviertel region in Austria. Its highest is peak is the Großer Peilstein with an altitude of 1062 m, which makes it also the second highest mountain of the whole Waldviertel.

The Ostrong is heavily forested and spans roughly 13 km in a north-south direction with the town of Persenbeug at its southern and Laimbach at its northern end. On its west side it is bordered by the valley of the Ysper river separating it from the Weinsberger Wald mountain range. The Ostrong increases slightly in altitude from South to North with the peaks in the North being about 200 m higher than those in South. Named peaks in the southern part are the Großer Mühlberg (509 m), the Galleck (727 m) and the Sulzberg (852 m). In the center there is the Kaiserstein (935 m) and the North features the Großer Peilstein (1062 m), the highest mountain of the range with the Kleiner Peilstein (1024 m) as a side peak just next to it and the Katzenstein (963 m). The Großer Peilstein is covered by forest but its side peak Kleiner Peilstein features a small cliff with a summit cross and provides an excellent viewpoint.

The Ostrong was one of favoured landscapes of the Austrian emperor Francis I (1768–1835), who often hiked here when he was spending time at his nearby summer residence Schloss Luberegg. The so-called Kaiserweg ("emperor's trail") traversing the northern ridge from the Kaiserstein to the Großer Peilstein was supposedly built on Francis' behalf.

Today the Kaiserweg coincides with a section of the long distance trail Eisenwurzenweg which crosses the Ostrong in a north-south direction starting at Persenbeug and ending at Laimbach.
