= Ernst Schwarz =

Ernst Schwarz may refer to:

- Ernst Schwarz (zoologist) (1889–1962), German zoologist, mammalogist, and herpetologist
- Ernst Schwarz (philologist) (1895–1983), German philologist
- Ernst Schwarz (politician) (1886–1958), Communist politician
- Ernst Schwarz (sinologist) (1916–2003), Austrian sinologist and translator
