= Leodolter =

Leodolter is an Austrian surname. Notable people with the surname include:

- Alois Leodolter (born 1931), Austrian skier
- Ingrid Leodolter (1919–1986), Austrian physician and Minister of Public Health and Environmental Protection
- Otto Leodolter (1936–2020), Austrian ski jumper
