= Maria Taferl =

- Municipality
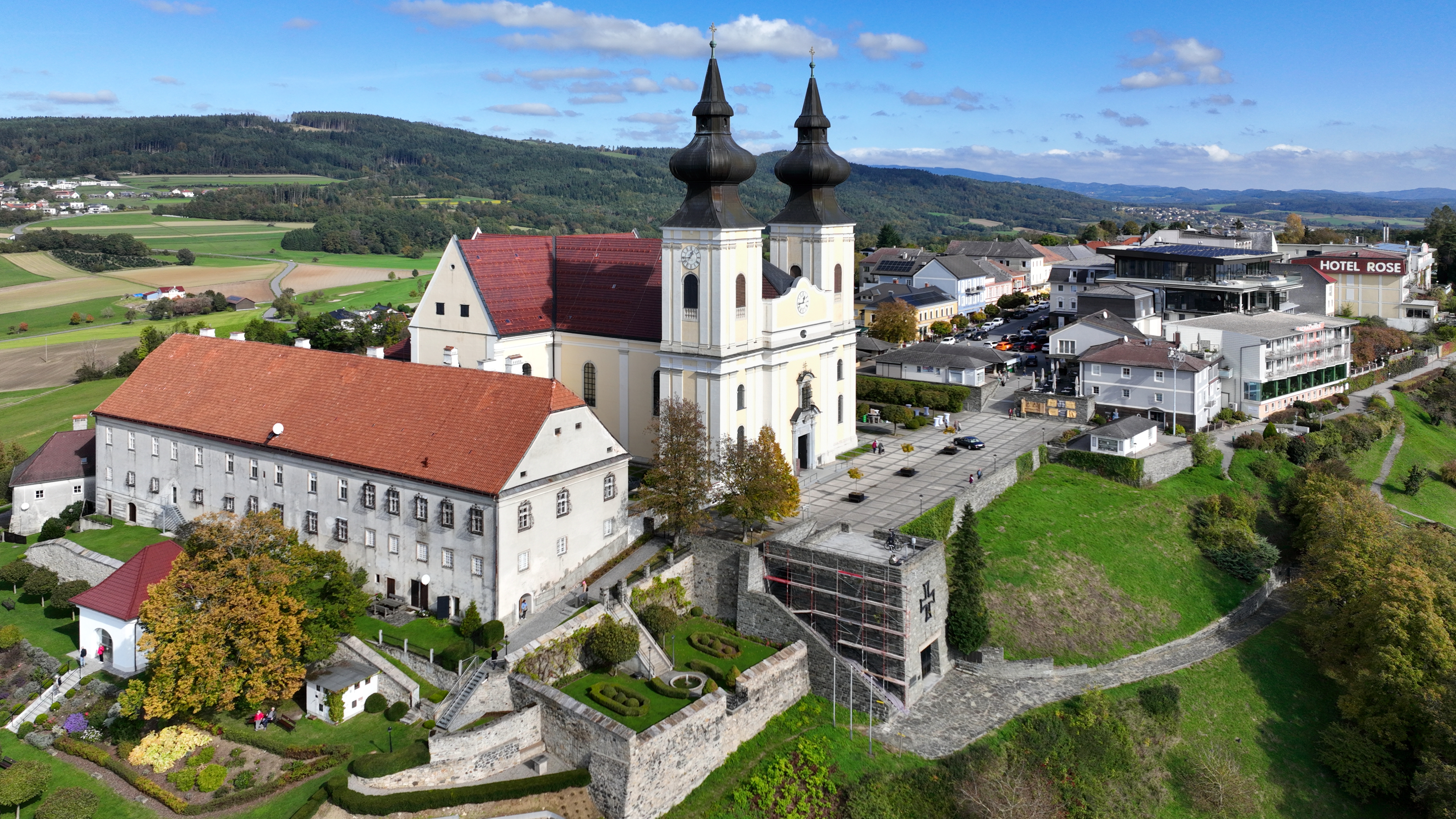
- Southwest view of Maria Taferl

- Coat of arms

- Location within Austria
- Coordinates: 48°13′36″N 15°09′35″E
- Country: Austria
- State: Lower Austria
- District: Melk

Government
  - Mayor: Herbert Gruber (ÖVP)

Area
  - Total: 12.17 km^{2} (4.70 sq mi)
- Elevation: 443 m (1,453 ft)

Population (2018-01-01)
  - Total: 887
  - Density: 72.9/km^{2} (189/sq mi)
- Time zone: UTC+1 (CET)
  - Summer (DST): UTC+2 (CEST)
- Postal code: 3672
- Area code: 07413
- Vehicle registration: ME
- Website: www.mariataferl.at

Maria Taferl is an Austrian market municipality of 872 people in the District of Melk and the most important pilgrimage site in all of Lower Austria. After Mariazell, Maria Taferl is the most important pilgrimage destination in all of Austria.

== Geography ==
Maria Taferl is located in the Nibelungengau in Lower Austria on a bank over the Danube. 47.48 percent of the municipality is forested. As the Maria Taferl Market, which takes place on the so-called "Taferlberg" (Taferl Mountain), the remaining districts are found in the hilly surrounding area. To the south, the basilica is widely visible throughout the town.

== History ==
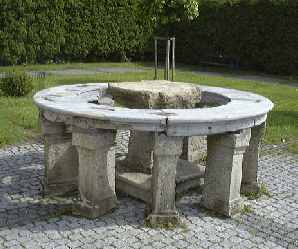
The Opferstein (Sacrifice Rock)

Little is known about the early settlement of Maria Taferl. The Celtic Kingdom of Noricum was located on the northern shore of the Danube. During Roman times, the Danube served as the border of the Province of Noricum. Even today in the church plaza, there is a stone of Celtic origin, on which heathen sacrifices were made. This attests to Maria Taferl's long tradition as a place of religious activity.

Maria Taferl and the surrounding countryside belonged to the territory of the Ostarrichi during the time of the Bambergs in the Middle Ages. It then became part of the Habsburg holdings. For a long time, it was part of the land of the Lords of Weißenberg, whose seat lay in the nearby town of Münichreith. It is assumed that the various districts of the town were already established during the Middle Ages. The history of the modern market of Maria Taferl begins in the 17th century.

The first church was built around a shrine to the Holy Mother, which is the origin of the name "Maria Taferl." The legends say that the statue of the Pietà at the shrine was an offering from Alexander Schinagel, a forester, who had a miraculous recovery from a serious illness. It replaced a crucifix there, which had also been the site of a miracle, for when local shepherd Thomas Pachmann tried to chop down the oak on which it was placed, he gravely injured both his legs. After a prayer to the Virgin Mary, his almost fatal wounds stopped bleeding. The old oak was destroyed by fire in 1755, which also damaged the statue.

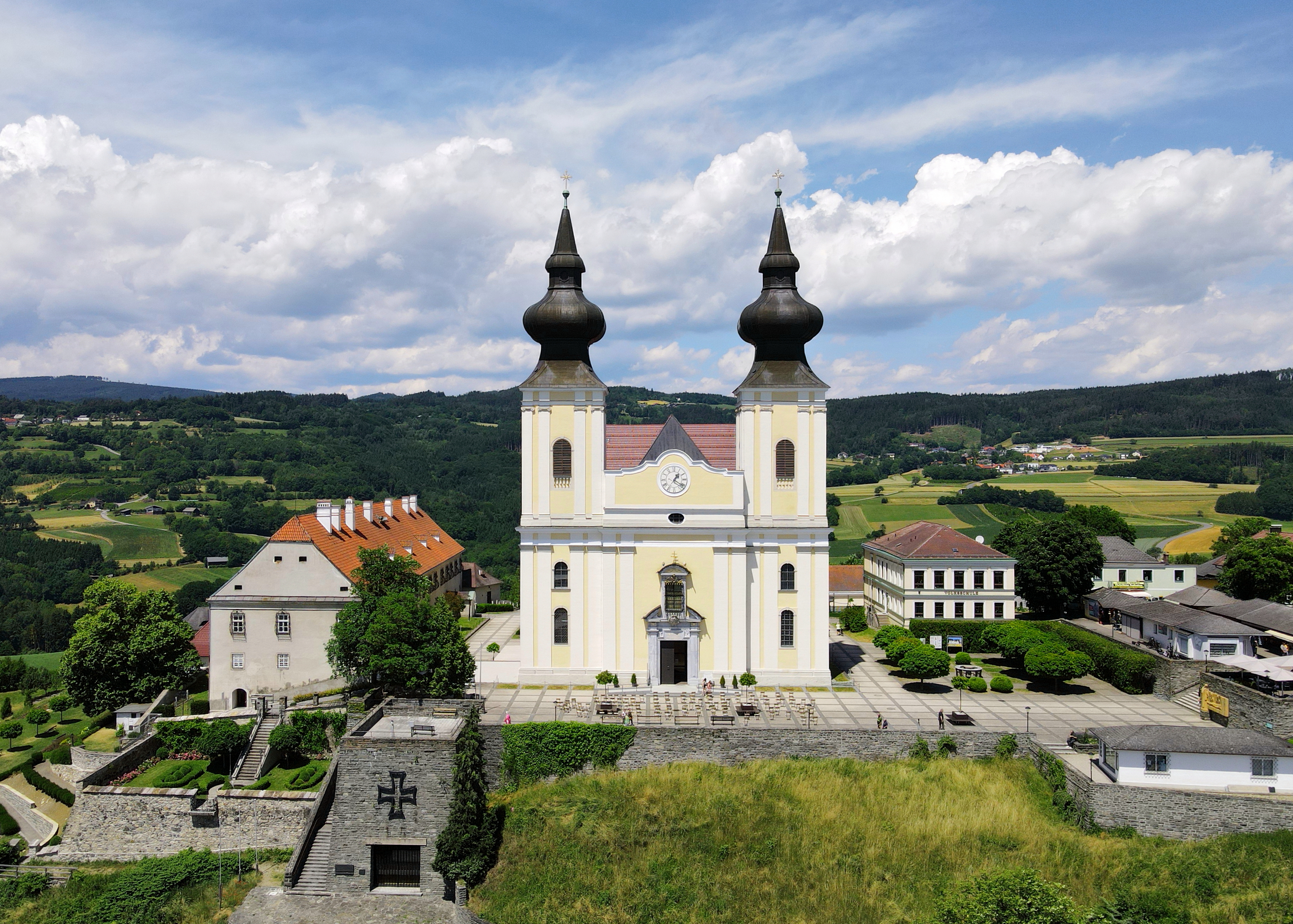
Pilgrimage and parish church Maria Taferl

The church building was built from 1660 to 1710. Its construction was begun under the imperial architect Georg Gerstenbrand and the Italian Carlo Lurago. Its famous cupola was built by Jakob Prandtauer from 1708 to 1710. He also designed the current appearance of Melk Abbey. The Maria Taferl church is built in the baroque style with ample amounts of gold leaf and a frescoed ceiling. In the center of the high altar is the namesake Marian stature. The building's rear houses its crypt.

According to an inscription in the building's interior, the building of the church gave the local inhabitants new courage after the Plague, the Turkish Wars, and the Thirty Years' War had all taken their toll. It also supported the ideas of the Counter-Reformation in the heartland of the Catholic House of Habsburg. All this speaks to Maria Taferl as an important manifestation of the Catholic faith on the main traveling route of the Danube.

There are many traditional stories of angelic processions here, which come from the 17th century. The tradition of pilgrimage to Maria Taferl also dates back to that time. In 1760 alone, there were 700 pilgrimage processions and over 19,000 masses said there. The church is also a kind of information treasure chest about its pilgrims, their origins, and their number. Within it are the gifts of the pilgrims, who came on account of illness and were cured. Another reason for Maria Taferl's importance as a pilgrimage destination was the stone cross, a gift from the citizens of Freistadt for pilgrims who died on the journey. It is also evidence of the exhausting nature of pilgrimage in those days. The murdered Archduke Franz Ferdinand of Austria and his family lived in the nearby Artstetten Castle and is known to have regularly attended mass at Maria Taferl.

Maria Taferl became a Basilica minor in 1947.

By 2010, the basilica's interior should have undergone a complete restoration. It will then celebrate a double jubilee: 350 years since the laying of its cornerstone in 1660, and 300 years since its completion in 1710. The interior's last restoration was around 50 ago; the exterior was restored in 1982, and in 1998, the domes of the two towers were re-covered.

Besides the basilica, in Maria Taferl there is also a monument for the Fallen of both World Wars. These men are honored annually at meeting of veteran's groups.

There is a folk belief that the water from the well at Maria Taferl can help with eye complaints.

Other landmarks in the town are the Elementary School Museum, as well as the mechanical nativity, which tells the story of Maria Taferl's origins.

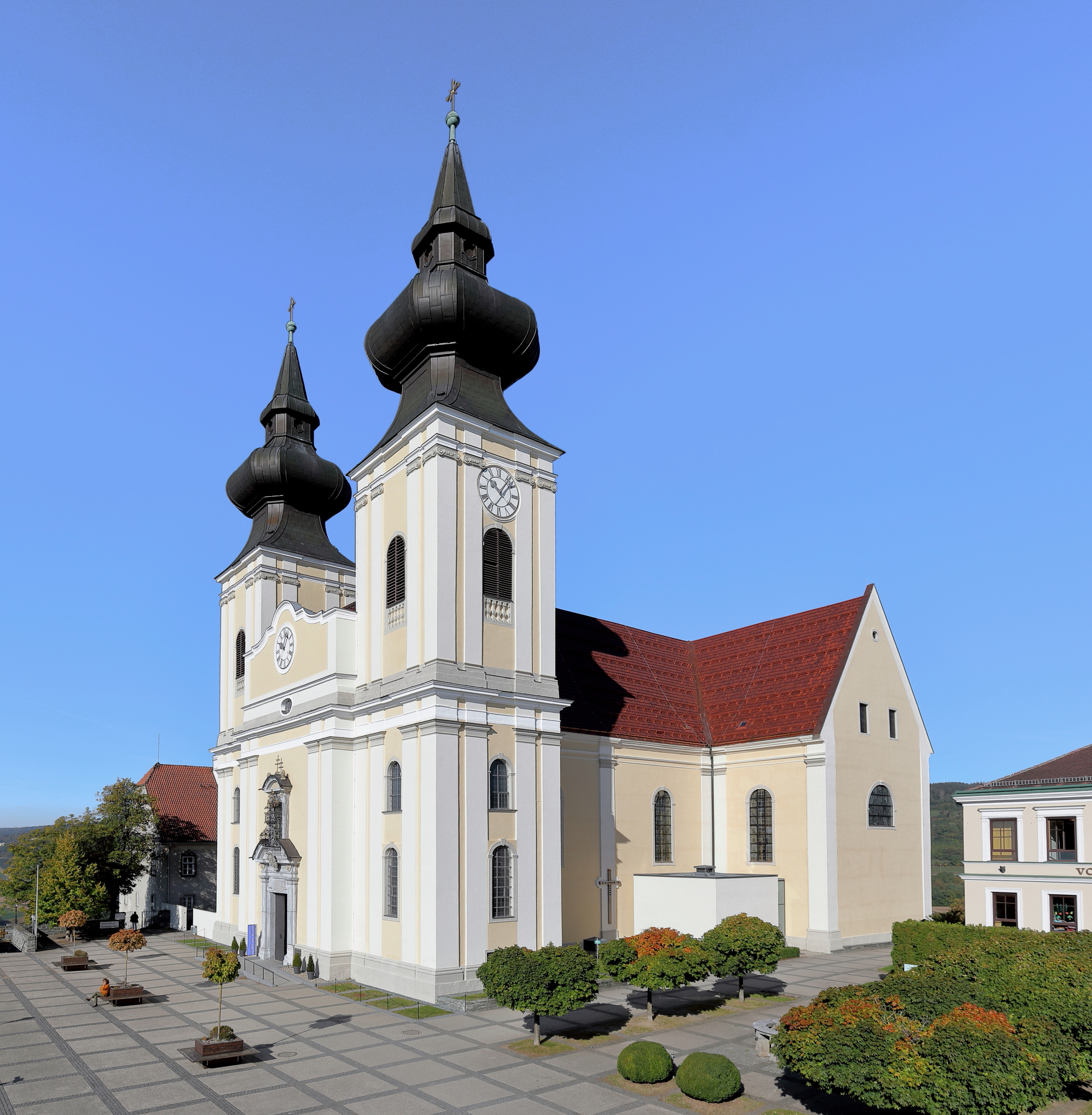
East view of the basilica

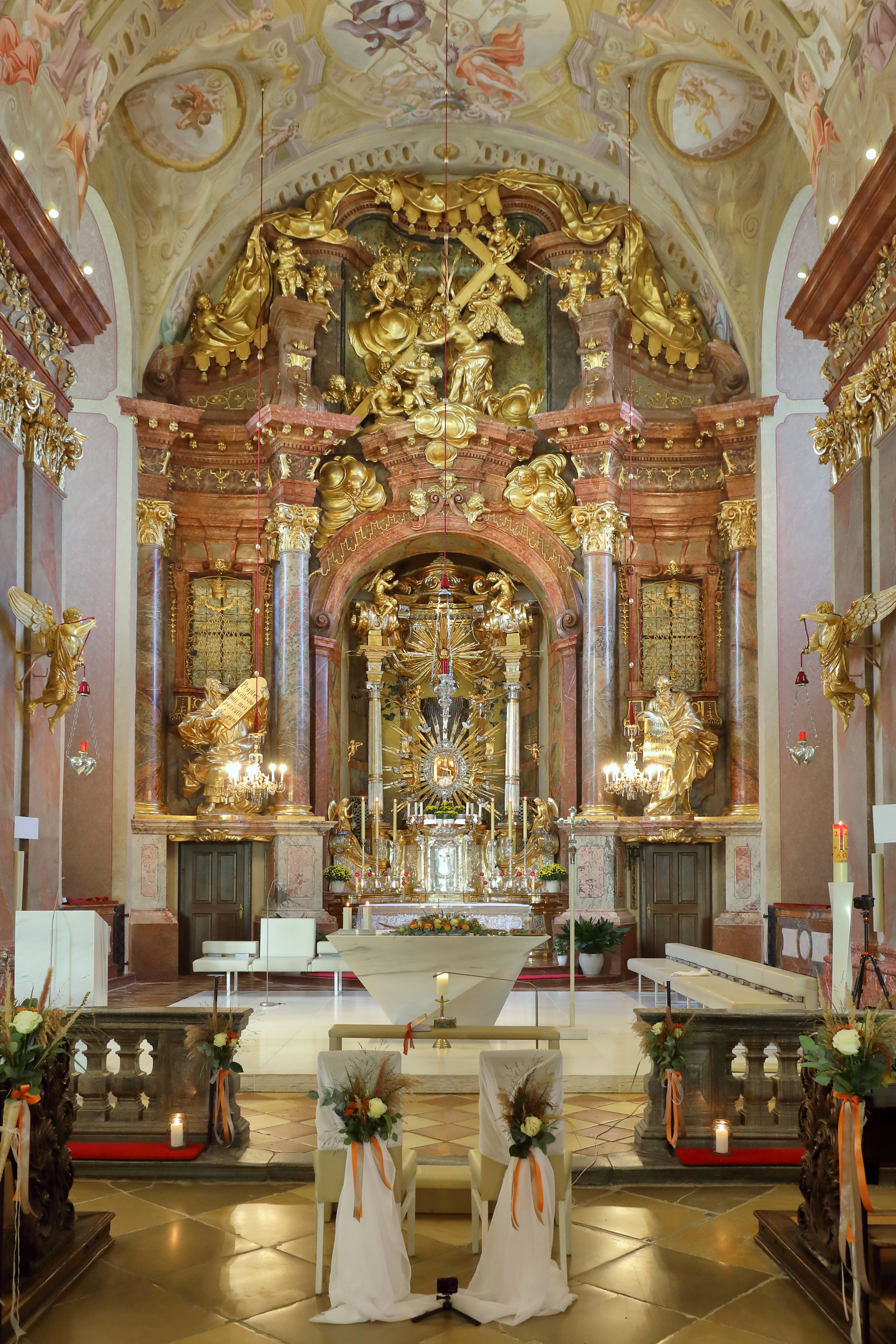
High altar of the basilica

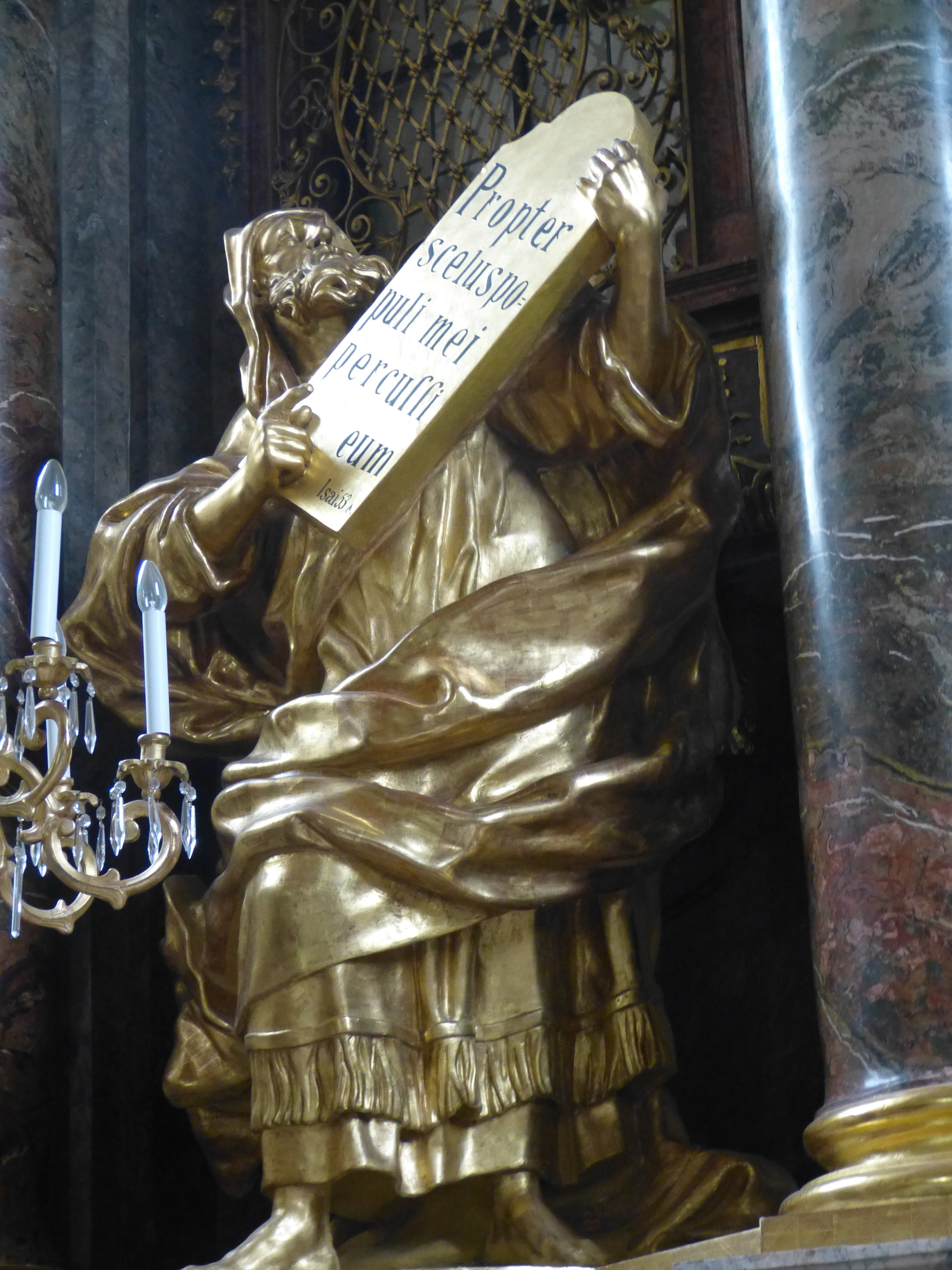
Statue of Isaiah on the high altar

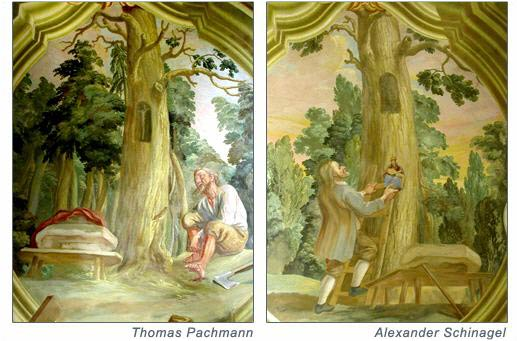
Pachmann and Schinagel depicted in the basilica

== Municipal divisions ==
The municipality of Maria Taferl is divided into seven districts:

- Maria Taferl Market
- Obererla
- Untererla
- Reitern
- Oberthalheim
- Unterthalheim
- Wimm

== Politics ==
The mayor of Maria Taferl is Herbert Gruber and the Chief Officer is Daniela Lahmer. In the Municipal Council the 15 seats went to the following parties: ÖVP 10 and SPÖ 5.

== Business and infrastructure ==
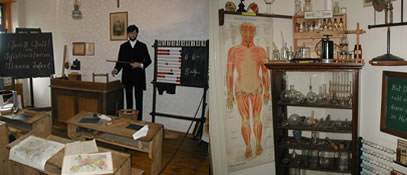
The Primary School Museum, Maria Taferl

After agriculture, tourism is the most important economic activity in Maria Taferl.
