= About Chekhov =

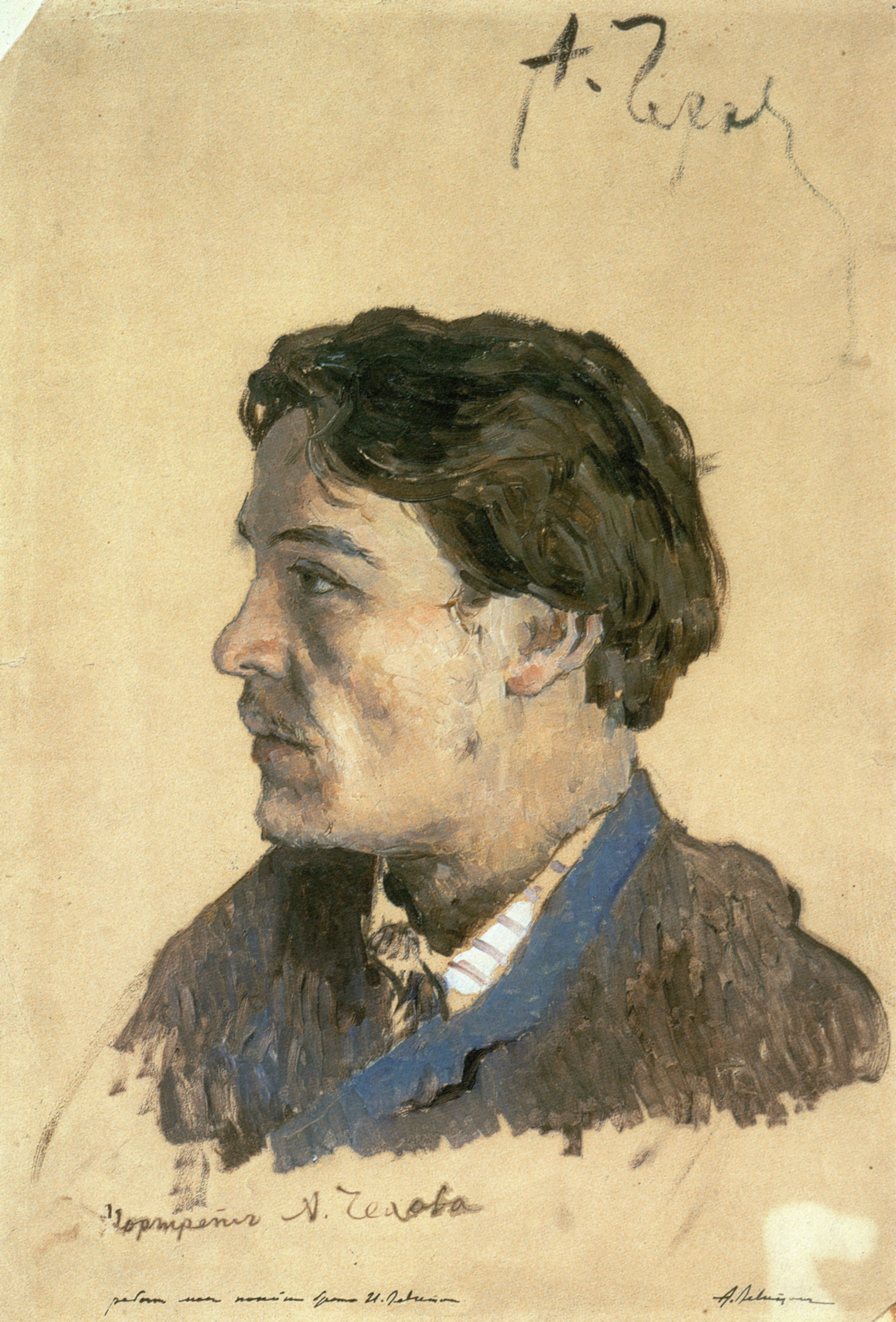
- Portrait of Chekhov by Isaac Levitan, 1886
- Author: Ivan Bunin
- Original title: О Чехове
- Language: Russian
- Genre: memoirs
- Publisher: Chekhov Publications (Издательство имени Чехова)
- Publication date: 1955 (New York)
- Publication place: Russia/United States
- Media type: print (Hardback & Paperback)
- ISBN: 0-8101-2388-6

About Chekhov (Russian: О Чехове, romanized: O Chekhove) is a book of memoirs by Nobel Prize-winning Russian author Ivan Bunin, devoted to Anton Chekhov, his friend and major influence. Bunin started working on the book in the late 1940s in France. It remained unfinished, and was completed by the writer's widow Vera Muromtseva (aided by Leonid Zurov), and came out posthumously in New York City, in 1955. Translated by Thomas Gaiton Marullo, the book was published in English in 2007, under the title About Chekhov. The Unfinished Symphony.

== Background ==
Ivan Bunin was greatly shocked and aggrieved by the death of Chekhov, his favourite writer. On July 9, 1904, he wrote to Maria Pavlovna, Chekhov's sister: "My dear friend, I am thunderstruck. Please bear in mind that with unspeakable pain I share all of you suffering." In July of the same year Maxim Gorky approached Bunin, suggesting that the latter should take part in a literary Chekhov memorial, a charitable almanac, initiated in Moscow by Aleksander Kuprin and Konstantin Pyatnitsky. "I'd suggest that just four of us should take part: Kuprin, you, Andreyev and me. Each might write something personal about Chekhov: about some conversation, the first meeting, remembering a day spent together and, apart from that, contribute a novella. Dear friend, I implore you to take part. We must do just something to counterbalance this barrage of these banal 'reminiscences' in the press. We are to show Chekhov without glamour, pure and clear, sweet and clever man," Gorky wrote Bunin in an 11 July 1904 letter.

In October 1904 Bunin completed his essay called "In Memory of Chekhov" and delivered it at the Lovers of Russian Literature Society's special meeting. On 20 November Gorky, having received the essay by post, praised it, mentioning Kuprin's approval. The special Chekhov issue of Znanye almanac (Book III), was published in 1905. In it, under the title "In Memory of Chekhov" there were the reminiscences of Bunin Stepan Skitalets and Kuprin. It also featured Dachniki, a novelette by Gorky and "The Red Laughter" by Andreyev. On January 17, 1910, Vladimir Nemirovich-Danchenko invited Bunin to read his memoirs at the Moscow Art Theatre where Chekhov's 50th birthday was commemorated.

In 1914, Bunin published "From My Notebook" sketches in Russkoye Slovo (No.151, July 2, 1914) and the Chekhov-related part of it served as a supplement for the piece published earlier. Along with it came the Odesskye novosty (No.9398, July 2) newspaper interview where Chekhov and his legacy also came up as the main theme. A year later, preparing his first The Complete series, he combined all the pieces and removed all the strong (and now irrelevant) statements concerning social and cultural issues of the early 1900s Russia. Two decades later, compiling his The Complete Bunin edition for the Petropolis publishing house in Berlin, he revised the essay again and renamed it as Chekhov. It was this version which was included into his Memoirs (1950) book.

Since 1904, Bunin was cherishing the idea of beginning an extensive Chekhov biography which would have included the latter's vast epistolary legacy. In 1911, answering Maria Chekhova's request that he should contribute a preface to the first volume of Chekhov's letters compilation (which came out later, in 5 volumes), Bunin commented: "These letters are wonderful and provide enough material for a large article. But do they need a preface? On serious consideration I'd say, no, they don't. As a basis for future biography, [these letters] are priceless... But to create a full literary portrait, one should look, of course, for many other sources, too."

Maria Chekhova regarded Bunin as the only person in the world who would be capable of creating the comprehensive Chekhov's biography in prose. On May 10, 1911, she wrote to Pyotr Bykov: "You've asked for my opinion as to who might write my late brother's biography and, as you may remember I recommended Ivan Al. Bunin. Now not only do I reaffirm my recommendation but positively ask you to choose him for that purpose. Nobody could write it better, he knew my brother very well, understood him and can perform the task objectively... I repeat: I would very much prefer the biography to be as true as possible to fact, and written by I.A.Bunin". Yet this large Chekhov biography has never materialised. In fact, later in Paris, upon rereading his early essay, Bunin inscribed on the copy of the 3rd Znanye book: "Written hastily and, occasionally in a wrong way: it was Maria Pavlovna with her narrow-minded prudery that misled me".

In the late 1940s while in France, Bunin received the Soviet Complete Checkov (published by Goslitizdat) with all letters included. This prompted him to set upon a book of memoirs. "In his last year on those sleepless nights - and he's lost almost all of his sleep – he spent his time scribbling things down on scraps of paper and cigarette boxes, remembering details of his conversations with Chekhov," Vera Muromtseva-Bunina remembered.

The book remained unfinished and, completed by Muromtseva-Bunina and her assistant Leonid Zurov, was published posthumously in 1955 in New York by Chekhov Publications. Ten years later, in a heavily censored version, it was included into the Volume IX of the Soviet Complete Bunin (1965) with the following explanation in the commentaries: "The specifics of this work is such that it's overloaded with quotations from contemporaries' memoirs (Avilova, Tikhonov and others), Chekhov's letters and shorts stories. Since this material is well known to a Soviet reader, it was excluded from this edition. We also omitted several highly tendentious comments on Soviet scholars' works." About Chekhov's full version has become available only in post-Soviet Russia.
