= Trumpets and Drums =

- Original language: German
- Written by: Bertolt Brecht
- Genre: Epic comedy

Premiere
- Date: 19 September 1955
- Place: Berliner Ensemble

Trumpets and Drums (German: Pauken und Trompeten) is an adaptation of an 18th-century English Restoration comedy by Farquhar, The Recruiting Officer. It was written by the German dramatist Bertolt Brecht in collaboration with Benno Besson and Elisabeth Hauptmann.

It was first performed in 1955 in a production directed by Besson, with music by Rudolf Wagner-Régeny (whose songs for the play have been called "Weill-like" by John Willett). It was the first premiere of Brecht's final season at the Berliner Ensemble. Willett identifies an instance of Brecht's lifelong indebtedness to Rudyard Kipling in the play's "Song of the Women of Gaa."

The production strongly influenced the English director William Gaskill's reinterpretation of Farquhar's original play for the National Theatre.

== Synopsis ==
Brecht offers the following account of the first scene of the play:

Plume, the recruiting officer, who has arrived from London, is informed by his Sergeant Kite about the state of the market for recruits and love. Recruiting is going badly, but Victoria, the justice's daughter, who a year earlier had been in pigtails, has been visiting a girl put in the family way by Plume. Plume gives his friend the shoe manufacturer, Worthy, a word of advice in matters of the heart and in return Worthy offers him a handsome commission on boots, which Worthy needs soldiers to fill.

== Sources ==
- Willett, John. 1967. The Theatre of Bertolt Brecht: A Study from Eight Aspects. Third rev. ed. London: Methuen, 1977. ISBN 0-413-34360-X.
- Willett, John and Ralph Manheim, eds. 1972. Collected Plays: Nine. By Bertolt Brecht. Bertolt Brecht: Plays, Poetry, Prose Ser. New York: Vintage. ISBN 0-394-71819-4.
