= Madam, Will You Talk? =

1955 novel by Mary Stewart

- First edition
- Author: Mary Stewart
- Cover artist: Eleanor Poore
- Language: English
- Genre: Mystery
- Publisher: Hodder & Stoughton
- Publication date: 1955
- Publication place: United Kingdom
- Media type: Print (hardcover)
- Pages: 224
- OCLC: 1297412
- LC Class: PR6069.T46 Mad

Madam, Will You Talk? is a novel by Mary Stewart, first published in 1955. It is Stewart's first published novel. The title is a quotation from a folk song, Madam, Will You Walk?: the line "Madam, will you walk and talk with me?" is quoted at the start of Chapter 17.

== Plot summary ==
Charity Selborne is on holiday in Provence with her friend and former colleague Louise. Before Charity's marriage to Johnny Selborne, they both taught at the same school in the West Midlands. Charity is now a widow; her husband's plane was shot down in France during the war (the action takes place 10 years after WWII). She is staying at the same hotel as David Shelley and his stepmother, Loraine Bristol. Mrs. Bristol has taken David to France from England. David's father, Richard Byron, an antique dealer, who has been accused of murder, is pursuing his son across France.

Also staying at the hotel are John Marsden, who is English and reads T. S. Eliot at breakfast, and Paul Véry, who is French. Both have parts to play in subsequent events.

Charity befriends 13-year-old David Shelley, who seems mature and literary for his age. Making a joke about confusing “David Shelley” with another of the Romantic poets, “David Byron”, Charity is surprised by David's alarmed reaction. She senses that David is carrying a burden too heavy for his years.

Mrs. Palmer, a guest at the Hotel Tistet-Vedene, gossips to Charity about the other guests. She recognizes Loraine Bristol as Loraine Byron from newspaper accounts of the sensational trial of her husband, Richard Byron. Byron was acquitted on insufficient evidence for the murder of his best friend, who had been having an affair with Loraine. On scene during the murder, David Byron had been hit over the head by the attacker but had professed that he had not seen the assailant.

Charity takes David on a local sightseeing trip, where David spots his father and makes an excuse to wait for Charity in a secluded church without revealing the reason why. By chance, Charity enters into conversation with “Richard Coleridge,“ and inadvertently lets slip the local abundance of Romantic poets, having just met a David Shelley. His reaction to the name makes Charity realize that this is Richard Byron. He presses her on where she met David Shelley, while she remains evasive. Charity manages to redirect his attention to a bus that is waiting for tourists, stating that David had mentioned that he would be catching that bus. While Byron waits for his son near the bus, Charity is able to return David to the hotel undetected by his father.

Believing David to be in danger from an aggressive father, Charity subsequently acts as a decoy, drawing Byron away in a car chase across Provence. The chase becomes a battle of nerves and tactics as Charity tries to outwit a persistent Richard Byron, who is determined to get her to reveal his son's whereabouts. Charity learns in the process that there are unresolved issues and crimes in the dangerous situation in which she has become enmeshed.
