= Robin Jenkins =

Scottish writer

- Born: John Robin Jenkins; 11 September 1912 nr. Cambuslang, Scotland
- Died: 24 February 2005 (aged 92)
- Education: University of Glasgow
- Occupation: Novelist
- Writing career
- Period: 1950-2005
- Genre: Scottish literature
- Notable work: The Cone Gatherers (1955)
- Notable awards: OBE; 1999; Andrew Fletcher of Saltoun prize 2008 lifetime achievement

John Robin Jenkins OBE (11 September 1912 – 24 February 2005) was a Scottish writer of 30 published novels, the most celebrated being The Cone Gatherers. He also published two collections of short stories.

== Career ==
John Robin Jenkins was born in Flemington near Cambuslang in 1912 to Annie (née Robin) and James Jenkins, spirit salesman. In 1919, his father died after serving in the trenches during World War I and his mother worked in domestic service to support her children.

He won a bursary to attend the Hamilton Academy, then a fee-paying school. The theme of escaping circumstances through education at such a school was to form the basis of Jenkins's later novel Happy for the Child (1953). Winning a scholarship, he subsequently studied literature at the University of Glasgow, graduating in 1936. During the World War II he registered as a conscientious objector and was sent to work in forestry in Argyll (forestry work would re-appear in The Cone Gatherers). Upon release of his first novel, So Gaily Sings the Lark (also derived from his conscientious objector experience) in 1950, he adopted the pen name 'Robin Jenkins'.

In the early years of his writing career, Jenkins worked as an English and history teacher. In the 1950s, he taught at Riverside Senior Secondary in Glasgow's East End and later moved with his family to Dunoon where he taught at Dunoon Grammar School. He spent four formative years at the Gaya School in Sabah, Borneo, living there with his wife May and their children. Before that, he had held British Council teaching posts in both Kabul and Barcelona.

His best-known novel, The Cone Gatherers, is based on his forestry work as a conscientious objector and is often studied in Scottish schools. While The Cone Gatherers has been criticised as being devoid of any real sense of place, other novels such as The Thistle and the Grail, his 1954 football story, paint vivid pictures of more accessible settings. His writing typically touches on many themes, including morality, the struggle between good and evil, war, class and social justice. Just Duffy is another of his novels which focuses on such themes, in a style which has been compared to that of the earlier Scottish writer, James Hogg.

Jenkins was awarded the OBE in 1999 and in 2003 received the Andrew Fletcher of Saltoun prize from the Saltire Society for his lifetime achievement. His portrait, by Jennifer McRae, is in the collection of the National Portrait Gallery of Scotland. The Robin Jenkins Literary Award has been established in his name.

Robin Jenkins died in 2005, aged 92; his novel The Pearl-fishers was published posthumously in 2007.

== Bibliography ==
=== Books ===
- So Gaily Sings the Lark (1950)
- Happy for the Child (1953)
- The Thistle and the Grail (1954)
- The Cone Gatherers (1955)
- Guests of War (1956)
- The Missionaries (1957)
- The Changeling (1958)
- Love Is a Fervent Fire (1959)
- Some Kind of Grace (1960)
- Dust on the Paw (1961)
- The Tiger of Gold (1962)
- A Love of Innocence (1963)
- The Sardana Dancers (1964)
- A Very Scotch Affair (1968)
- Holy Tree (1969)
- The Expatriates (1971)
- A Toast to the Lord (1972)
- Far Cry from Bowmore and Other Stories (1973) (short story collection)
- A Figure of Fun (1974)
- A Would-be Saint (1978)
- Fergus Lamont (1979)
- The Awakening of George Darroch (1985)
- Just Duffy (1988)
- Poverty Castle (1991)
- Willie Hogg (1993)
- Leila (1995)
- Lunderston Tales (1996) (short story collection)
- Matthew and Sheila (1998)
- Poor Angus (2000)
- Childish Things (2001)
- Lady Magdalen (2003)
- The Pearl-fishers (†, 2007)
- Flowers

=== Articles ===
- 'Speaking as a Scot', in Lindsay, Maurice (ed.), The Scottish Review: Arts and Environment, 27 August 1982, pp. 18 & 19, ISSN 0140-0894

== Reviews ==
- Bruce, George, "The World of Robin Jenkins", a review of Love is a Fervent Fire, in Saltire Review, Vol. 6, No. 20, Spring 1960, The Saltire Society, Edinburgh, pp. 73 - 77
- Magnusson, Magnus, review of Some Kind of Grace, in Thomson, David Cleghorn, Saltire Review, Vol. 6, No. 23, Winter 1961, The Saltire Society, Edinburgh, pp. 75 & 76
- Magnusson, Magnus, review of Dust on the Paw, in Gordon, Giles and Scott-Moncrieff, Michael (eds.). New Saltire 2: Autumn 1961, The Saltire Society, Edinburgh, pp. 66 & 67
- Craig, David (1980), review of Fergus Lamont, in Cencrastus No. 2, Spring 1980, pp. 39 – 41, ISSN 0264-0856
- Review of The Conegatherers, in Cencrastus No. 4, Winter 1980–81, p. 47, ISSN 0264-0856
