= Paul Berna =

French writer

Jean-Marie-Edmond Sabran (21 February 1908, Hyères, Var – 19 January 1994, Paris), best known by his pseudonym Paul Berna, was a French writer whose children's books were also published in Britain and the United States.

== Biography ==
Before becoming a full-time writer, he worked on a suburban newspaper. After publishing several books under his own name, from 1952 he wrote children's books under the pseudonym Paul Berna. His books were published by Rouge et Or, the publishing house where his brother Guy Sabran worked as an illustrator. The brothers collaborated on Zoupette en camping, Les Contes des mille et une nuits and Nous irons à Lunaterra.

His most famous book, Le Cheval sans tête, usually known in English as A Hundred Million Francs, was published in 1955. It concerns the adventures of a gang of street urchins from the slums of Paris whose plaything, a headless horse on wheels, is used as a hiding place by train robbers. It has been translated into several languages, enjoying great success in Britain and the United States. In 1963, the Disney Studios in Britain filmed the book as The Horse Without a Head: The 100,000,000 Franc Train Robbery, scripted by T. E. B. Clarke and starring Jean-Pierre Aumont and Herbert Lom.

The Mystery of the Cross-eyed Man was read on Jackanory in 1968 by Keith Barron.

Paul Berna also wrote science fiction novels, the best known being La Porte des étoiles (Threshold of the Stars) and its sequel Le Continent du Ciel (Continent in the Sky).

For his adult novels he used the pseudonyms Bernard Deleuze and Paul Gerrard, and for detective fiction, Joel Audrenn.

In 1958, Jean Sabran married Jany Saint-Marcoux, herself an author of Rouge et Or books for children.

At the end of his life he suffered from blindness.

== Works in translation ==
- Threshold of the Stars (La Porte des étoiles), 1954
- Continent in the Sky (Le Continent du ciel), 1955
- A Hundred Million Francs (Le Cheval sans tête), 1955
- The Street Musician (Le Piano à bretelle), 1956
- The Knights of King Midas (Millionnaires en herbe), 1958
- Flood Warning (La Grande Alerte), 1960
- The Mystery of Saint Salgue (La Piste du souvenir), 1962
- The Clue of the Black Cat (Le Témoignage du chat noir), 1963
- The Mystery of the Cross-Eyed Man (Les Pèlerins de Chiberta), 1965
- Magpie Corner (Le Carrefour de la Pie), 1966
- The Mule on the Motorway aka The Mule on the Expressway (Le Commissaire Sinet et le mystère de l'autoroute du sud), 1967
- A Truckload of Rice (Le Commissaire Sinet et le mystère des poissons rouges), 1968
- The Secret of the Missing Boat (L'Epave de la Bérénice), 1969
- They Didn't Come Back (Un Pays sans légende), 1969
- Myna Bird Mystery (L'Opération oiseau-noir), 1970
- Gaby and the New Money Fraud (Le Bout du monde), 1971
- Vagabonds of the Pacific (Les Vagabonds du Pacifique), 1973
- The Vagabonds Ashore (La Grande nuit de Mirabal), 1973

=== As Bernard Deleuze ===
- Vagabond of the Andes (Vagabond des Andes) (1953)
- The Vengeance of Don Manuel (1953)
