= Shen Deqian =

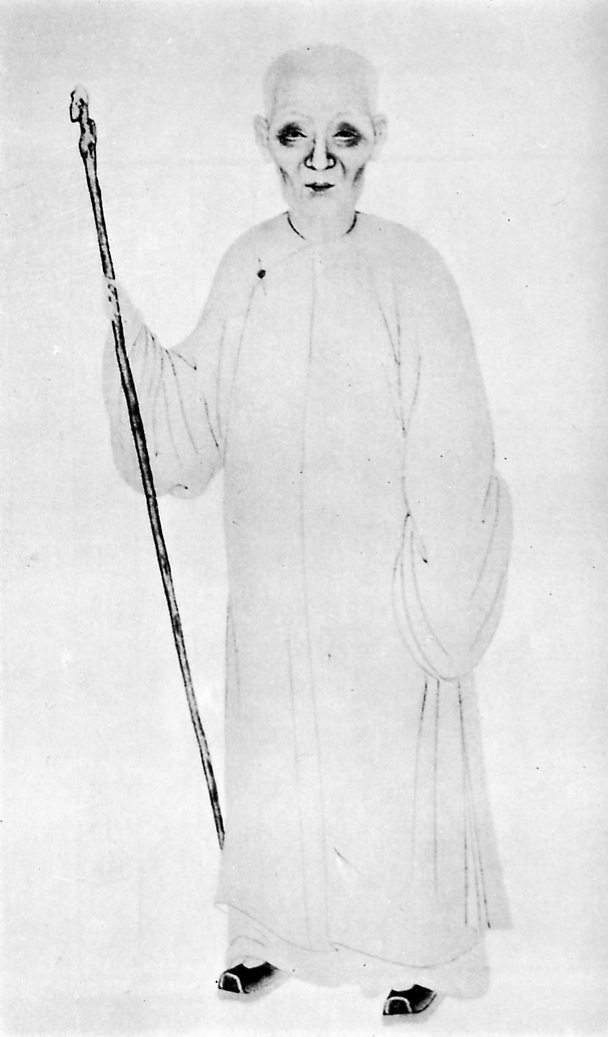
- Shen Deqian's portrait

Vice-Minister of Rites of the Qing Dynasty
- In office 1747-1748
- Monarch: Qianlong Emperor

Personal details
- Born: 1673 Suzhou
- Died: 1769 (aged 96) Suzhou

Shen Deqian (Chinese: 沈德潜; pinyin: Shěn Déqián; 1673–1769), courtesy name Queshi (Chinese: 碻士; pinyin: Quèshì), pseudonym Guiyu (Chinese: 歸愚; pinyin: Guīyú) was a Chinese scholar, official, poet, critic and anthologist of the Qing dynasty.

Born in Suzhou, Shen achieved popularity at an early age for his articles and poems. However, he did not obtain the title of provincial graduate (juren) until 1738, after seventeen attempts. The next year, he finally passed the imperial examination and was chosen to enter the Hanlin Academy. He was immediately introduced into the inner circle of the Qianlong Emperor, who was seeking to establish his own poet laureate. He retired from the position of Vice-Minister of Rites in 1749 and died twenty years later at the age of 96.

Shen Deqian formulated his poetic theory by stressing the four essential elements : purport (宗旨), form (體裁), tone (音節) and spiritual resonance (神韻).
