= Hu Hua =

Chinese historian

Hu Hua (simplified Chinese: 胡华; traditional Chinese: 胡華; pinyin: Hú Huá; December 1921 – 14 December 1987) was a Chinese historian.

A native of Fenghua, Zhejiang, Hu Hua was born in December 1921. He began working alongside the Chinese Communist Party (CCP) to oppose Japanese forces in 1937, shortly after the Second Sino-Japanese War had started. Hu was assigned to the Eighth Route Army in 1938, and was active in Wuhan and Changsha. Hu formally joined the CCP in February 1939, by which time he had relocated to northern Shanxi. Hu began his teaching and research career in April 1940, at the North China United University. Throughout the 1940s, Hu taught at several educational institutions in North China. In 1948, the CCP Central Committee convened a group of academics led by Hu, and reporting to Wu Yuzhang. The group was charged with gathering materials to teach the history of the CCP.

After 1949, Hu joined the faculty of the People's University of China. While teaching there, Hu wrote The History of China's New Democratic Revolution in 1950, and Lectures on the History of the Chinese Revolution in 1959. The two books were regarded as standard texts for students of CCP history up to the Cultural Revolution. During the Cultural Revolution itself, Hu worked for two years in a rural labor camp. Upon regaining favor, Hu became an adviser to the Museum of the Chinese Revolution with the help of Zhou Enlai. With the fall of the Gang of Four, Hu returned to lecturing and was deputy director of the CCP Central Committee's History Materials Research Institute. In this position, Hu co-drafted the Resolution on Certain Questions in the History of Our Party since the Founding of the People's Republic of China. The resolution was adopted by the CCP in June 1981.

Books written by Hu following his return to academia include The Early Life of Zhou Enlai in 1977, and Lectures on the History of China's Socialist Revolution and Construction in 1985. He was principal editor of Biographies of Personalities in Chinese Communist Party History. The series included 50 volumes and more than 500 biographies of lead figures in the Communist Party. Hu became better-known to sinologists outside of China when Harrison Salisbury's The Long March: The Untold Story was published in 1985. Hu was cited in The Cambridge History of China.

Hu's first trip overseas was funded via a grant from the Australia–China Council. From March to April 1986, he was a visiting professor of government at the University of Sydney. He spoke at the University of Sydney's Centre for Asian Studies Conference on the History of Asian Communist Parties, and gave seminars at many Australian universities, among them the University of New South Wales, the Australian National University, La Trobe University, the Melbourne China Studies Group, the University of Adelaide, and Flinders University. In 1987, Hu traveled to the United States. Later that year, he was diagnosed with liver cancer. He sought medical treatment in Shanghai and died, aged 66, on 14 December 1987. Eleven days later, Hu was cremated at Babaoshan Revolutionary Cemetery.
