= The Cone Gatherers =

1955 novel by Robin Jenkins

- First edition
- Author: Robin Jenkins
- Language: English
- Genre: Novel
- Publisher: Macdonald
- Publication date: 1955
- Publication place: Scotland
- Media type: Print (Hardback & Paperback)

The Cone Gatherers (also The Cone-Gatherers) is a novel by the Scottish writer Robin Jenkins, first published in 1955.

The background to the novel comes from Jenkins' own wartime experience as a conscientious objector doing forestry work.

== Plot ==
Two brothers, Calum (a simple-minded hunchback) and Neil, are working in the forest of a Scottish country house during five autumn days (Monday to Thursday) in 1943, gathering cones that will replenish the forest, which is to be cut down for the war effort. The harmony of their life together is shadowed by the obsessive hatred of Duror, the gamekeeper, who since childhood has disliked anything he finds "misshapen".

Lady Runcie-Campbell, the aristocratic landowner, dislikes having the two brothers on the estate, and tries to avoid communicating with them. She is embarrassed by her son, Roderick, who is friendly and welcoming to the brothers.

The obsession Duror has for the brothers grows stronger, leading to the climax, when Lady Runcie-Campbell discovers Calum hanging dead from a tree, having been shot by Duror, who subsequently shoots himself.

== Significance ==
The Cone Gatherers has sometimes been compared to John Steinbeck's Of Mice and Men due to the similarities in theme, plot and characters, although the novel grew directly out of Jenkins' personal experiences in the Second World War.

The novel is often used in Scottish secondary schools, where it is taught as part of the Higher English curriculum.

== Adaptations ==
The novel was adapted for the stage by Peter Arnott and toured by Aberdeen Performing Arts in 2012.
