= Ingrid Leodolter =

Austrian politician and physician

Ingrid Maria Margarete Leodolter (14 August 1919 – 17 November 1986) was a physician and Austria's first Minister of Public Health and Environmental Protection.

== Biography ==
Ingrid Zechner was born on 14 August 1919 in Vienna. She attended the Medical School of the University of Vienna and earned her medical degree in 1943. She completed training in internal medicine in 1951. She was the medical director of the Sophia Hospital in Vienna from 1961 to 1971. Following the establishment of the Ministry of Public Health and Environmental Protection, Leodolter was selected as the first minister in 1972. She served in that role until 1979. During her tenure, the mother-child-pass examination programme was passed in 1974, resulting in a reduction in infant mortality from 23.5 per thousand in 1974 to 7.4 per thousand in 1992.

She married Josef Leodolter in 1938. She died on 17 November 1986 in Vienna.
