= Gao Yubao =

Chinese writer (1927–2019)

- Simplified Chinese: 高玉宝
- Traditional Chinese: 高玉寶
Transcriptions
Standard Mandarin
- Hanyu Pinyin: Gāo Yùbǎo
- Wade–Giles: Kao^{1} Yü^{4}-pao^{3}
- IPA: [káʊ ŷ.pàʊ]

Gao Yubao (Chinese: 高玉宝; Wade–Giles: Kao^{1} Yü^{4}-pao^{3}; 6 April 1927 – 5 December 2019) was a Chinese writer, best known for his autobiographical novel Gao Yubao. The novel, based on his childhood under Japanese occupation, became highly influential in the People's Republic of China. More than six million copies of the book were printed, and it was translated into over 20 languages. A short story from the novel was adapted into a popular animated film, The Rooster Crows at Midnight. The villain of the story, a greedy landowner nicknamed Zhou Bapi ("Zhou the flayer"), became one of the most famous evil landlords in China.

== Early life ==
Gao was born on 6 April 1927 into a poor peasant family in Sunjiatun Village in Fu County (now Wafangdian), Liaoning, Republic of China, and grew up under Japanese occupation. He entered school at age eight, but had to quit school to work after less than a month. When he was nine, his family moved to Dalian, where he worked as a child labourer. At age 15, he took up his sick father's job in a copper mine.

After the surrender of Japan, Gao enlisted in the People's Liberation Army in November 1947, and joined the Chinese Communist Party the following year. During the Chinese Civil War, Gao fought in the Liaoshen campaign, the Pingjin campaign, and the Battle of Hengbao, and was decorated six times.

== Career ==
Uneducated and nearly illiterate, Gao began learning to read and write while in the army, and soon started to write his autobiographical novel Gao Yubao. In his manuscript, which is now displayed at the Military Museum of the Chinese People's Revolution, he drew pictures and symbols to represent characters he could not write. In January 1951, he completed the first draft of the novel, with more than 200,000 characters. After much revision, the book was published in 1955.

Due to Gao's illiteracy, much of the book was ghostwritten by the army writer Guo Yongjiang (郭永江), also known by the pen name Huang Cao (荒草). In a letter to another author, Guo said that he had written 13 chapters of Gao Yubao. The story bears resemblance to the popular Soviet novel How the Steel Was Tempered.

In 1954, Gao was admitted to Renmin University of China to receive a formal education. He graduated in 1962 from the university's Department of Journalism, and became a full-time military writer in the Shenyang Military Region with the rank of a division commander. In the following decades, he wrote novels such as I Am a Soldier and A Sequel to Gao Yubao, as well as essays, short stories, reportage literature, and poems. He was also a motivational speaker, making more than five thousand speeches to five million people in total.

Gao died in Dalian on 5 December 2019, aged 92.

== Influence and criticism ==
The novel Gao Yubao was highly influential in Communist China. It was translated into seven minority languages of China and fifteen foreign languages, and more than six million copies were printed in the next 50 years. Two short stories from the novel, entitled "The Rooster Crows at Midnight" and "I Want to Go to School", were used in primary school textbooks in China.

"The Rooster Crows at Midnight" (zh:半夜鸡叫) was adapted into a popular animated film. The villain of the story is a landlord named Zhou Chunfu (周春富). Known by the nickname Zhou Bapi ("Zhou the flayer") in the story, he became one of the most famous evil landlords in Communist China. Although Gao Yubao is considered a novel, Gao claimed that the story was based on his real life experience. Zhou Chunfu was the name of a real landlord in Gao's village who had been beaten to death during the Land Reform Movement in the late 1940s. According to Zhou's great-grandson Meng Lingqian, however, the evil deeds attributed to Zhou were mostly made up, and the real Zhou was not even classified among the top 2,000 richest landlords in Fu County. However, the notoriety of the fictional Zhou Bapi caused severe hardship to Zhou Chunfu's descendants during Maoist China.
