= Münichreith-Laimbach =

- Municipality
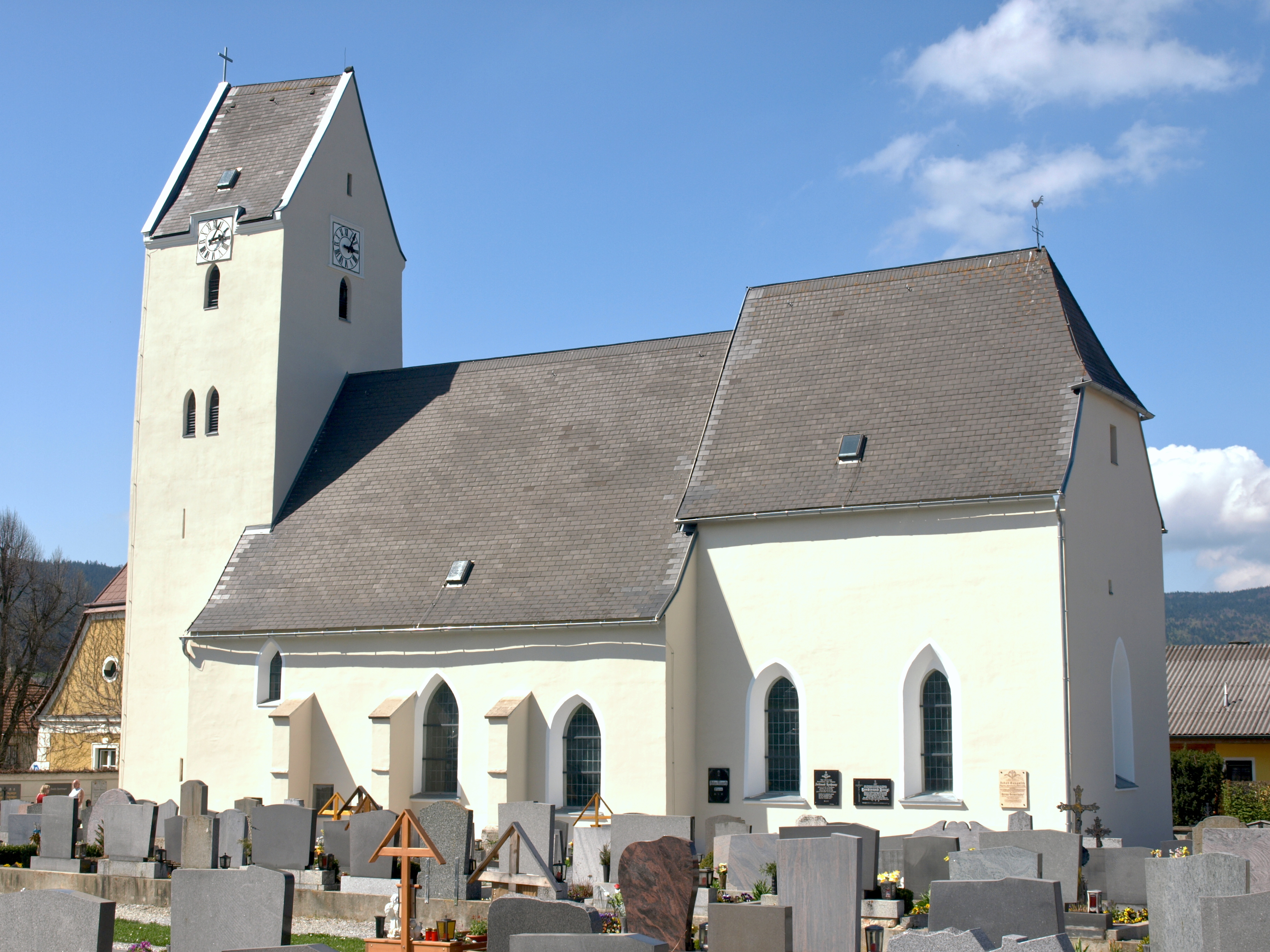
- Münichreith-Laimbach parish church

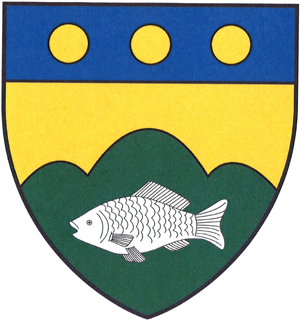
- Coat of arms

- Location within Austria
- Coordinates: 48°24′N 15°18′E
- Country: Austria
- State: Lower Austria
- District: Melk

Government
  - Mayor: Jürgen Fellnhofer (HLL-ÖVP)

Area
  - Total: 38.82 km^{2} (14.99 sq mi)
- Elevation: 675 m (2,215 ft)

Population (2018-01-01)
  - Total: 1,662
  - Density: 42.81/km^{2} (110.9/sq mi)
- Time zone: UTC+1 (CET)
  - Summer (DST): UTC+2 (CEST)
- Postal code: 3662, 3663
- Area code: 07413, 02758
- Website: www.muenichreith.at www.laimbach.at

Münichreith-Laimbach is a town in the district of Melk in the Austrian state of Lower Austria.

== Population ==
Historical population
Year	Pop.	±%
1869	1,478	—
1880	1,556	+5.3%
1890	1,539	−1.1%
1900	1,538	−0.1%
1910	1,497	−2.7%
1923	1,487	−0.7%
1934	1,553	+4.4%
1939	1,522	−2.0%
1951	1,470	−3.4%
1961	1,511	+2.8%
1971	1,680	+11.2%
1981	1,701	+1.2%
1991	1,723	+1.3%
2001	1,687	−2.1%
